= Military history of Canada =

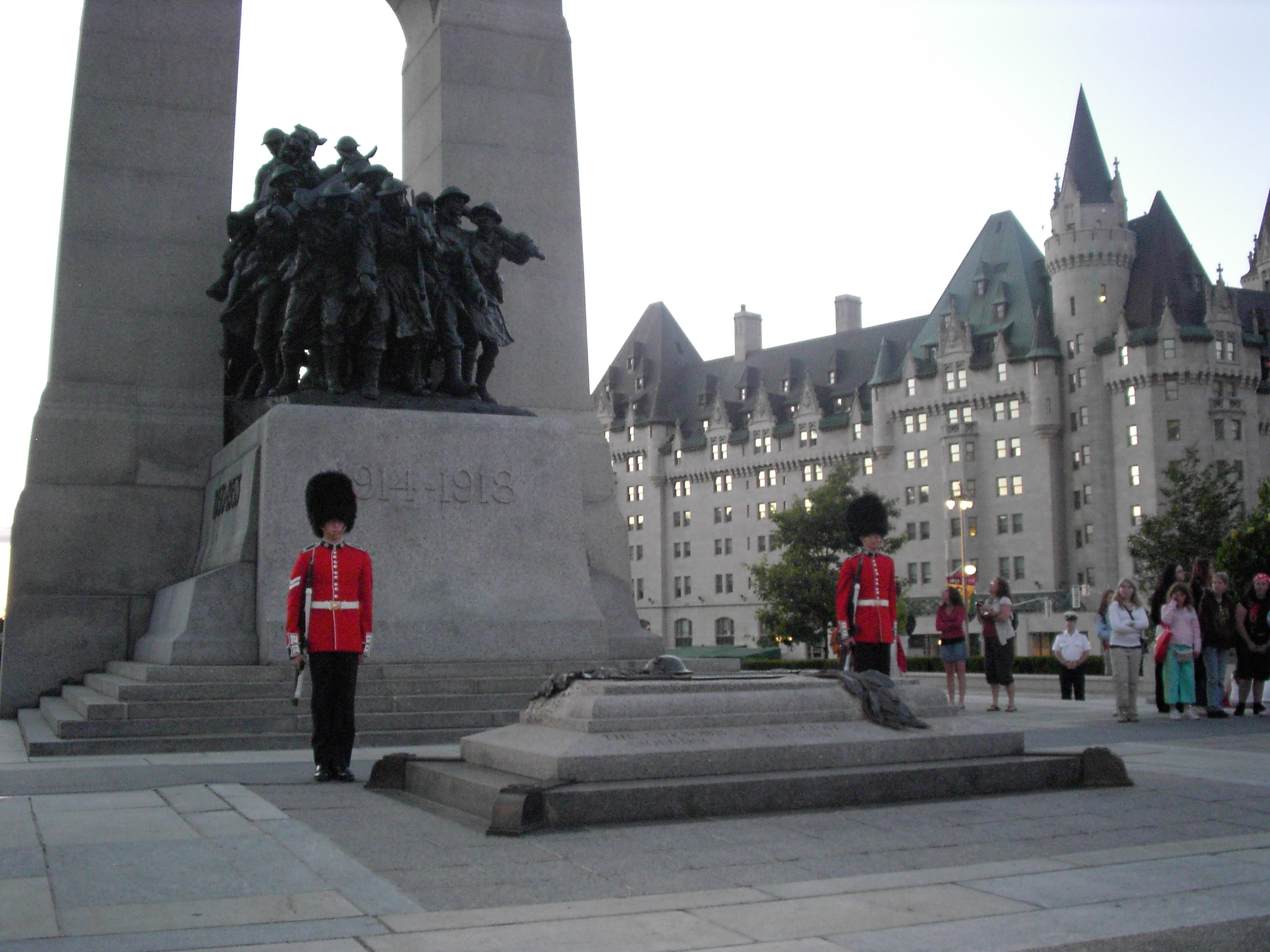
Ceremonial Guard stand watch over Canada's national memorial, The Response, with the Tomb of the Unknown Soldier in the foreground.

The military history of Canada spans centuries of conflicts within the country, as well as international engagements involving the Canadian military. The Indigenous nations of Canada engaged in conflicts with one another for millennia. The arrival of European settlers in the 17th century led to new alliances and hostilities among Indigenous nations and colonial powers, leading to conflicts such as the Beaver Wars.

The late 17th and 18th centuries saw four major British-French conflicts fought in Canada, culminating with the British conquest of New France in 1760. This reshaped the region and contributed to the American Revolutionary War, during which American attempts to seize Quebec and spark a revolt in Nova Scotia failed.

The 19th century brought both external threats and internal challenges to British North America. While its colonies repelled American invasions during the War of 1812, the Rebellions of 1837–1838 and Fenian raids highlighted the need for militia reforms and contributed to Canadian Confederation in 1867. The end of the century saw Canadian units become involved in British imperial conflicts like the Nile Expedition and Second Boer War.

In the 20th century, Canada played a significant role in both World Wars. After World War II, it embraced multilateralism, with its military participating in international coalitions and peacekeeping missions, including the Korean War and the Gulf War. In the 21st century, Canada has continued its involvement in multilateral military coalitions, contributing to missions in the Greater Middle East and Mali.

== Warfare pre-contact ==
Warfare took place throughout the continent at various levels of in intensity, frequency and decisiveness. Periods of raiding occurred even in subarctic areas that had sufficient population density. However, Inuit groups in the extreme northern Arctic typically avoided direct warfare due to their small populations, relying on traditional law to resolve conflicts. Conflict was waged for economic and political reasons, such as asserting their tribal independence, securing resources and territory, exacting tribute, and controlling trade routes. Additionally, conflicts arose for personal and tribal honour, seeking revenge for perceived wrongs.

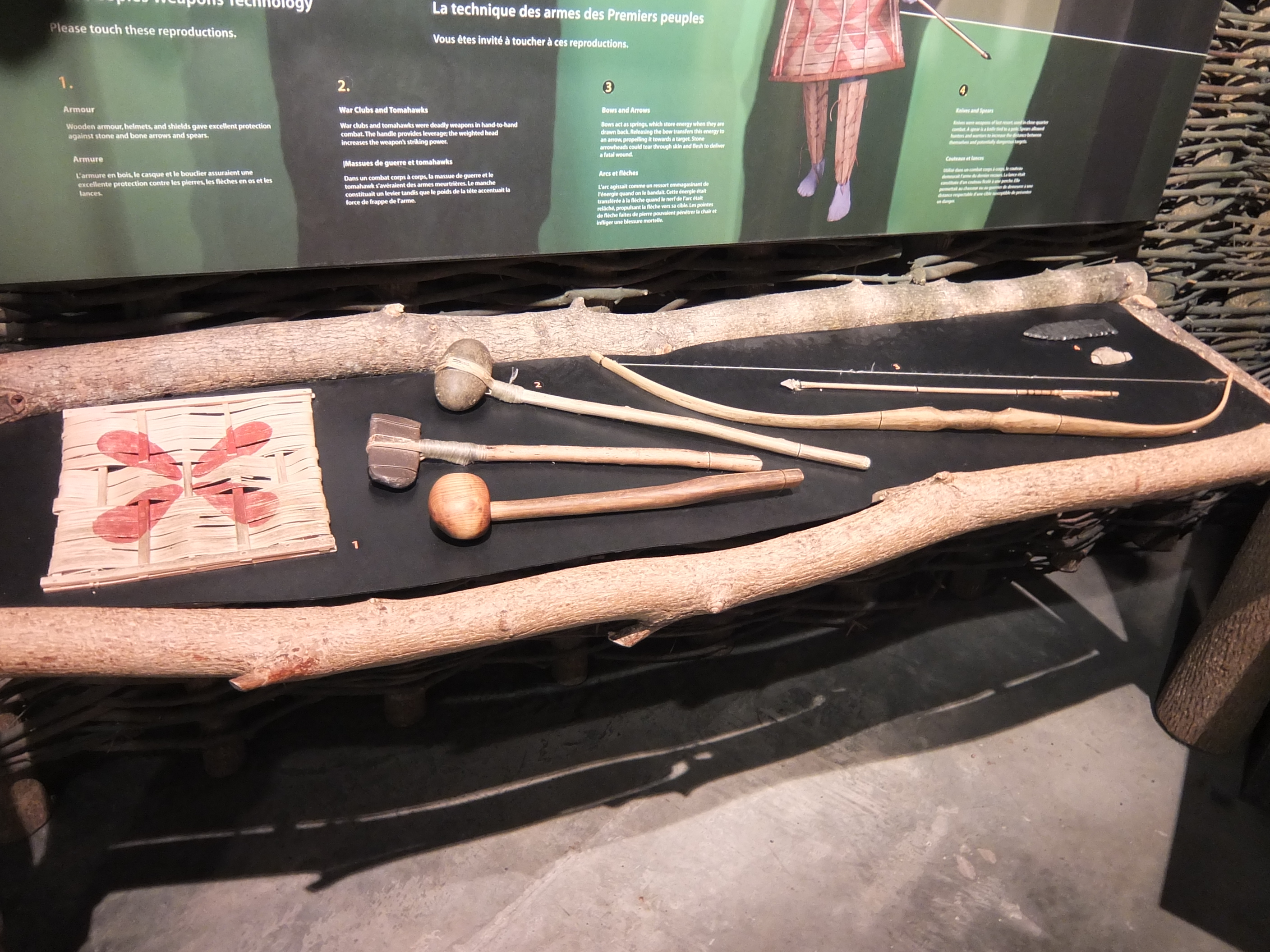
Indigenous weaponry on display at the Canadian Museum of History

In pre-contact Canada, Indigenous warriors relied primarily on the bow and arrow, having honed their archery skills through their hunting practices. Knives, hatchets/tomahawks and warclubs were used for hand-to-hand combat. Some conflicts took place over great distances, with a few military expeditions travelling as far as 1,200 to 1,600 kilometres (750 to 990 mi).

Warfare tended to be formal and ritualistic, resulting in few casualties. However, major conflicts sometimes occurred. The St. Lawrence Valley Iroquoians were also almost completely displaced, likely due to warfare with their neighbours the Algonquin. The threat of conflict impacted how some groups lived, with Algonquian and Iroquoian groups residing in fortified villages with layers of defences and wooden palisades at least 10-metre-tall (33 ft) by 1000 CE.

Captives from battles were not always killed. Tribes frequently adopted them to replenish lost warriors or used them for prisoner exchanges. Slavery was common among the Pacific Northwest Coast's Indigenous people like the Tlingit and Haida, with around a quarter of the region's population being enslaved. In certain societies, slavery was hereditary, with slaves and their descendants being prisoners of war.

Several First Nations also formed alliances with one another, like the Haudenosaunee Confederacy. These military alliances became important to European colonial powers in their struggle for North American hegemony during the 17th and 18th centuries.

=== European contact ===
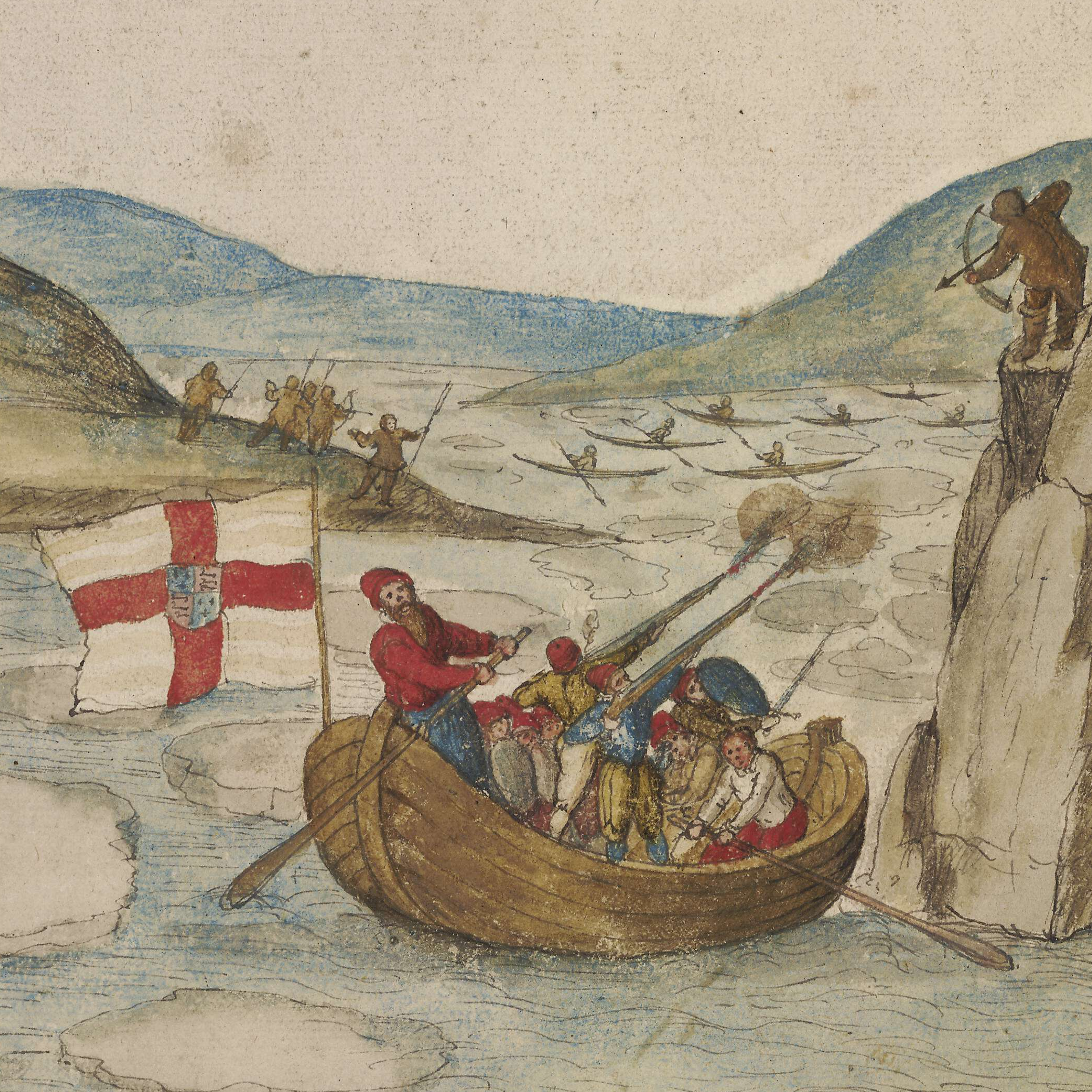
Skirmish between Martin Frobisher's men and Inuit, c. 1577–78.

The first clash between Europeans and Indigenous peoples likely transpired around 1003, during Norse attempts to settle North America's northeastern coast, such as at L'Anse aux Meadows. Although relations were initially peaceful, conflict arose between the Norse and local First Nations, or Skrælings, possibly due to the Norse's refusal to sell weapons. Indigenous bows and clubs proved effective against Norse weaponry, and their canoes offered greater manoeuvrability in an environment they were familiar with. Outnumbered, the Norse abandoned the settlement.

The first European-Indigenous engagements to occur in Canada during the Age of Discovery took place during Jacques Cartier's third expedition to the Americas from 1541 to 1542. Between 1577 and 1578, the Inuit clashed with English explorers under Martin Frobisher near Baffin Island.

== 17th century ==
Firearms began to make their way into Indigenous hands by the early 17th century, with significant acquisition starting in the 1640s. The arrival of firearms made fighting between Indigenous groups bloodier and more decisive, especially as tribes got embroiled in the economic and military rivalries of European settlers. Unequal access to firearms and horses significantly amplified bloodshed in Indigenous conflicts. By the end of the 17th century, Indigenous peoples of the Northeastern Woodlands and the eastern subarctic rapidly transitioned to firearms, supplanting the bow. Though firearms predominated, the bow and arrow saw limited use into the early 18th century as a covert weapon for surprise attacks.

Map of European claims on North America at the end of the 17th century, with European forts and settlements also shown. English claims are coloured in pink, while French claims are coloured in blue. The English and French had conflicting claims around Hudson Bay and Newfoundland.

Early European colonies in Canada include the French settlement of Port-Royal in 1605 and the English settlement of Cuper's Cove five years later. French claims stretched to the Mississippi River valley, where fur trappers and colonists established scattered settlements. The French built a series of forts to defend these settlements, although some were also used as trading posts. New France's two main colonies, Acadia on the Bay of Fundy and Canada on the St. Lawrence River, relied mainly on the fur trade. These colonies grew slowly due to difficult geographical and climatic circumstances. By 1706, its population was around 16,000. By the mid-1700s, New France had about one-tenth of the population of the British Thirteen Colonies to the south. In addition to the Thirteen Colonies, the English chartered seasonal fishing settlements in Newfoundland Colony and claimed Hudson Bay and its drainage basin, known as Rupert's Land, through the Hudson's Bay Company (HBC).

The early military of New France was made up of regulars from the French Royal Army and Navy, supported by the colonial militia. Initially composed of soldiers from France, New France's military evolved to include volunteers raised within the colony by 1690. Many French soldiers stationed in New France also chose to stay after their service, fostering a tradition of generational service and the creation of a military elite. By the 1750s, most New French military officers were born in the colony. New France's military also relied on Indigenous allies for support to mitigate the manpower advantage of the Thirteen Colonies. This relationship significantly impacted New French military practices, like the adoption of Indigenous guerrilla tactics by its military professionals.

=== Beaver Wars ===
The Beaver Wars (1609–1701) were intermittent conflicts involving the Haudenosaunee Confederacy, New France, and France's Indigenous allies. By the 17th century, several First Nations' economies relied heavily on the regional fur trade with Europeans. The French quickly joined pre-existing Indigenous alliances such as the Huron-Algonquin alliance, bringing them into conflict with the Haudenosaunee Confederacy, who initially aligned with Dutch colonists and later with the English. As a result, the primary threat against New France in its early years were the Haudenosaunee, particularly the easternmost Kanien'kehá:ka, known to Europeans as the Mohawk.

Conflict between the French and Haudenosaunee likely arose from the latter's ambition to control the beaver pelt trade. However, some scholars posit Iroquoian hegemonic ambitions as a factor, while others suggest these were "mourning wars" to replenish populations in the wake of the epidemic that afflicted Indigenous peoples. Regardless, Haudenosaunee hostilities against First Nations of the St. Lawrence Valley and Great Lakes disrupted the fur trade and drew the French into the wider conflict.

==== 1609–1667 ====
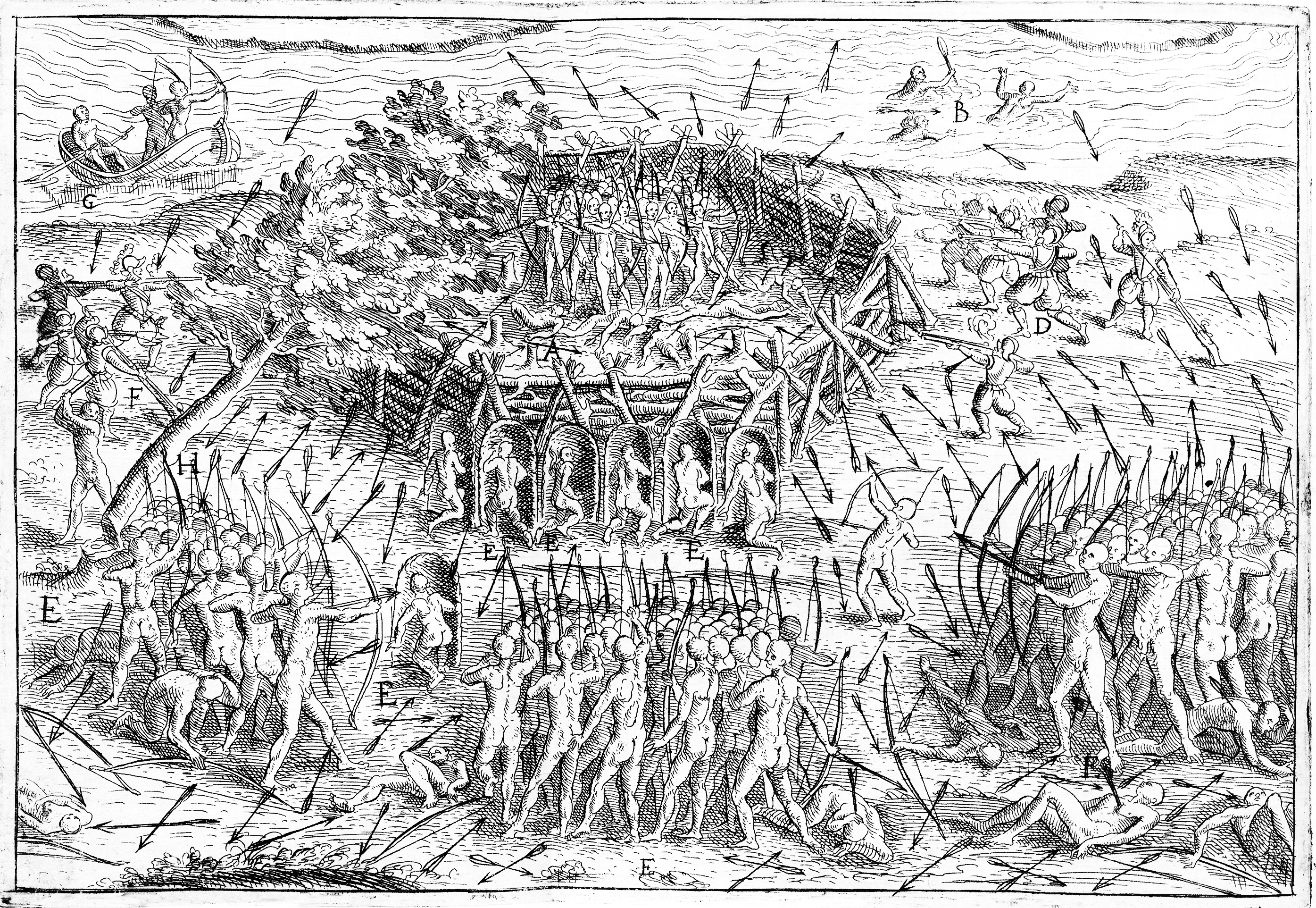
Algonquin, French, and Wendat forces besiege a Mohawk fort during the Battle of Sorel in 1610.

Initially, the French offered limited support to their Indigenous allies, providing iron arrowheads and knives, but few firearms. Although France's Indigenous allies saw some success, the Haudenosaunee gained the initiative after adopting tactics that integrated Indigenous hunting skills and terrain knowledge with firearms acquired from the Dutch. Access to firearms proved decisive, enabling the Haudenosaunee to wage an effective guerrilla war.

After depleting the beaver population within their lands, the Haudenosaunee launched several expansionist campaigns, raiding the Algonquin in the Ottawa Valley and attacking the French in the 1630s and 1640s. These attacks caused the dispersion of the Neutral, Petun, and Wendat Confederacy, along with the systematic destruction of Huronia. The string of Haudenosaunee victories isolated the French from their Algonquin allies and left its settlements defenceless. Exploiting this, the Haudenosaunee negotiated a favourable peace, requiring French Jesuits and soldiers to relocate to Haudenosaunee villages so they could aid in their defence.

Haudenosaunee warriors attack a fort defended by a Franco-Indigenous force at the Battle of Long Sault, 1660

Hostilities resumed between the two sides in 1658 when the French withdrew their Haudenosaunee missions. After years of expansionist campaigns in the mid-1650s, the outbreak of a wider front in 1659 and 1660 strained the Confederacy. To secure a favourable peace, the French sent the Carignan-Salières Regiment in 1665, the first uniformed professional soldiers stationed in Canada, and whose members later formed the core of the Compagnies franches de la marine militia. The regiment's arrival led the Haudenosaunee to agree to peace in 1667.

==== 1668–1701 ====
After the 1667 peace, the French formed alliances with First Nations further west, most of whom conflicted with the Haudenosaunee. The French provided them with firearms and encouraged them to attack the Haudenosaunee. They also solidified ties with the Abenaki in Acadia, who were harassed by the Haudenosaunee. Hostilities resumed in the 1680s when the Haudenosaunee targeted French coureurs de bois and the Illinois Confederation, a French ally. French-allied expeditions were launched in 1684 and 1687, though only the latter saw some success.

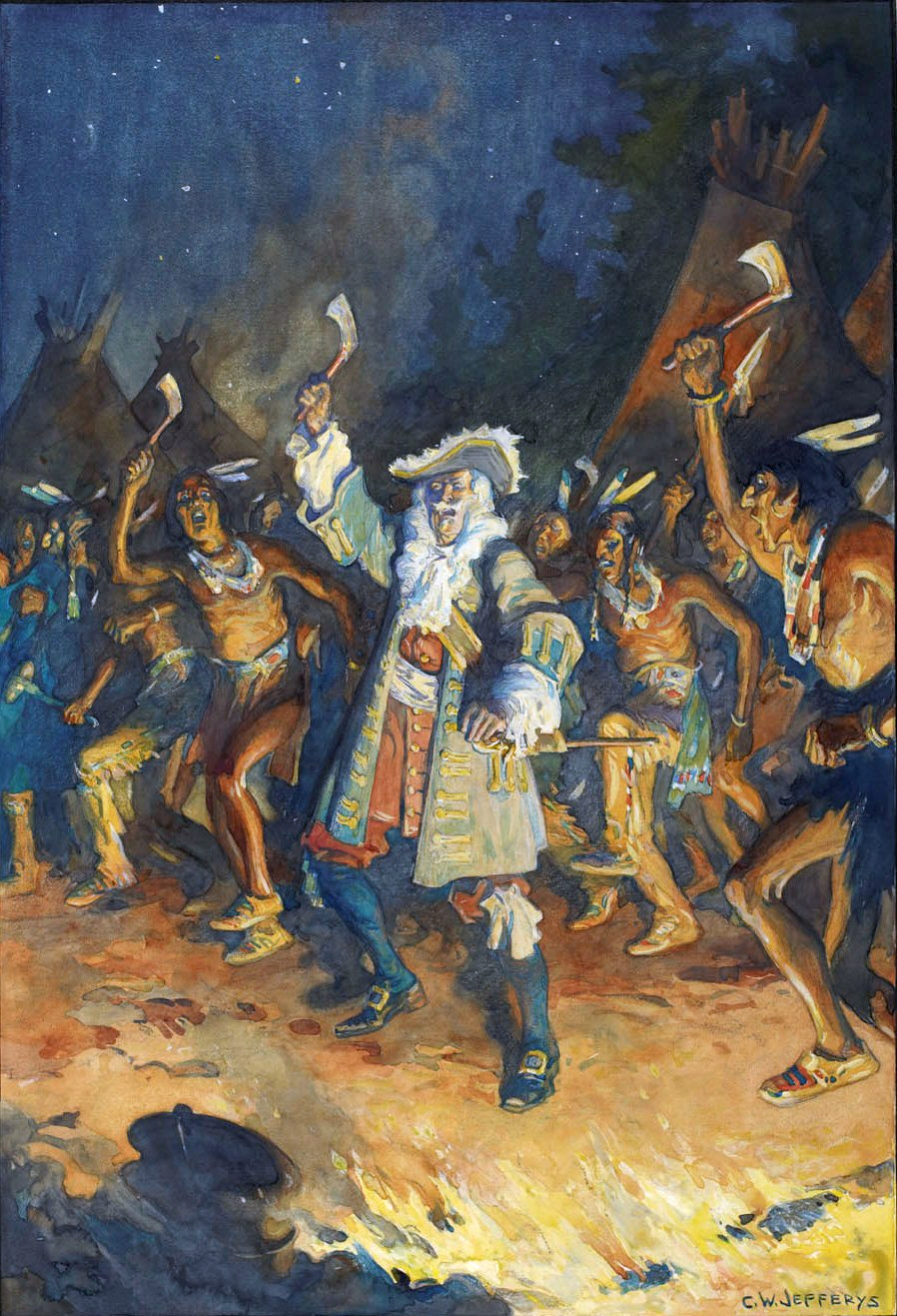
Governor General Louis de Buade de Frontenac with First Nation allies, c. 1690s

In 1689, the Haudenosaunee launched new attacks, including the Lachine massacre, to support their English allies during the Nine Years' War and in retaliation for the 1687 expedition. However, after a flurry of raids by France's western allies and a Franco-Indigenous expedition led by Governor General Louis de Buade de Frontenac in 1696, the weakened Haudenosaunee opted to negotiate peace. The Great Peace of Montreal was signed in 1701 between the Haudenosaunee, France, and 38 other First Nations. The terms saw the Haudenosaunee agree to remain neutral in Anglo-French conflicts in return for trade benefits. This weakened the English-Haudenosaunee trading relationship and Covenant Chain.

=== Early British-French colonial hostilities ===
English-French hostilities over colonial interests first escalated in 1613 when Samuel Argall and his sailors razed the French settlement of Port-Royal with little resistance to secure the Bay of Fundy fisheries for the English colony of Virginia.

==== Anglo-French War (1627–1629) ====
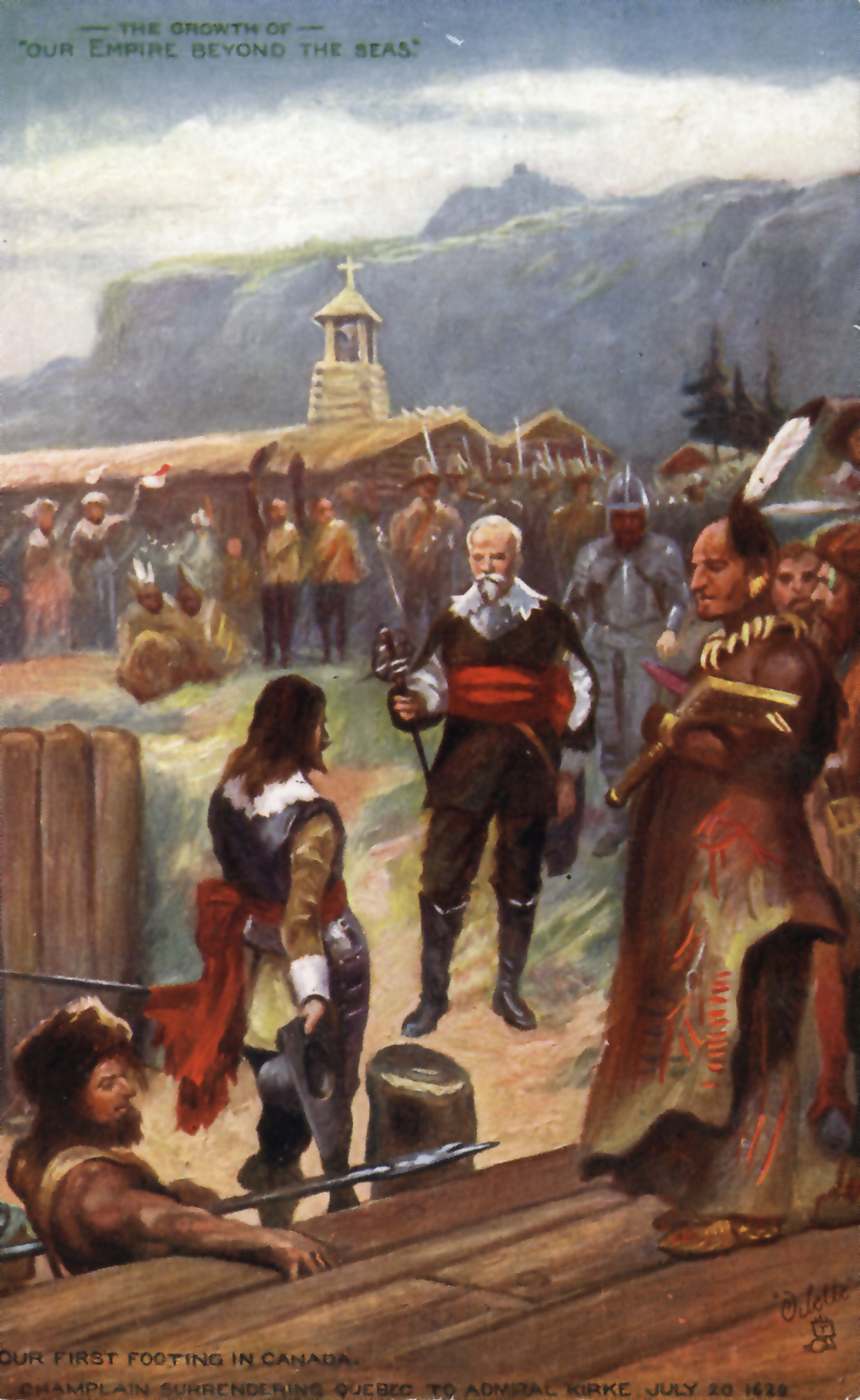
David Kirke accepting the surrender of Quebec from Samuel de Champlain, 1629

During the 1627–1629 Anglo-French War, the English authorized David Kirke to conduct raids against the French in Canada and settle the area. Kirke's forces seized a French supply fleet and Tadoussac in 1628, and captured Quebec City the next year.

Scottish settlers founded settlements in seized French territories like Port-Royal and Baleine. However, French forces destroyed Baleine just two months after its founding in 1629. In 1630, an Anglo-Scottish attack against Fort St. Louis, one of France's last remaining Acadian strongholds, was repulsed. French settlements that were seized during the war were returned in the 1632 Treaty of Saint-Germain-en-Laye.

=== Acadian Civil War ===
Acadia fell into civil war in the mid-17th century. After Lieutenant Governor Isaac de Razilly died in 1635, Acadia was split administratively. Charles de Menou d'Aulnay ruled from Port-Royal and Charles de Saint-Étienne de la Tour governed from Saint John. Unclear boundaries overs administrative authority led to conflict between the two governors.

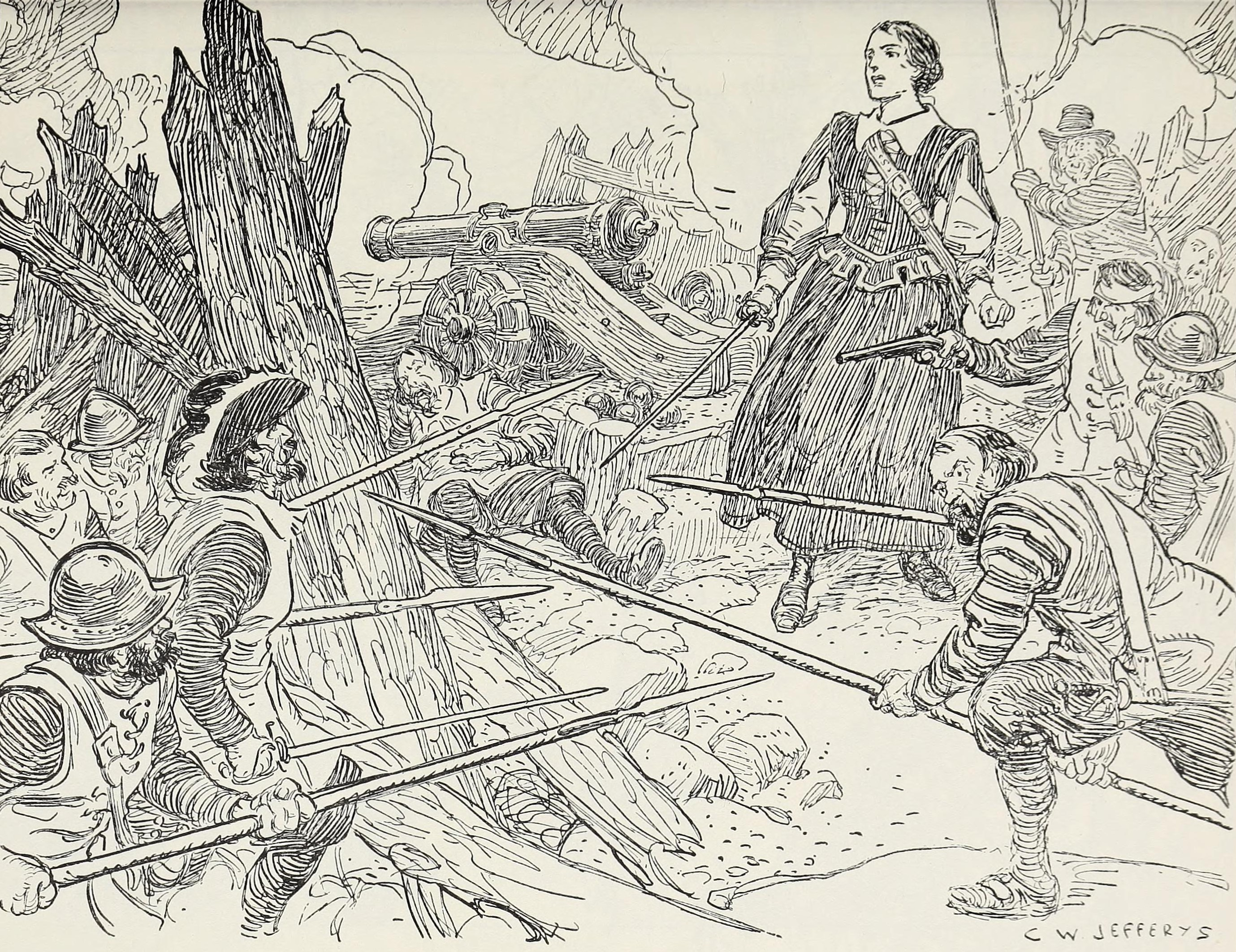
Françoise-Marie Jacquelin defends Fort Sainte Marie with other supporters of Charles de Saint-Étienne de la Tour during the decisive engagement of the Acadian Civil War in 1645.

In 1640, La Tour forces attacked Port-Royal. In response, d'Aulnay imposed a five-month blockade on Saint John. La Tour's forces overcame the blockade and retaliated with an attack on Port-Royal in 1643. In April 1645, d'Aulney besieged and captured Saint John, after hearing of La Tour's departure to meet his supporters in New England. d'Aulney governed all of Acadia from 1645 until he died in 1650, having gained favour with the French government by informing them of La Tour's attempt to seek aid from the English in New England. After d'Aulney's death, La Tour returned to France and regained his reputation and governorship over Acadia in 1654.

=== English invasion of Acadia ===
English forces under Robert Sedgwick invaded Acadia in 1654, several years after the Acadian Civil War and years of neglect from French court. La Tour was captured and taken prisoner to London, where an agreement was reached with Oliver Cromwell to have La Tour's title to Acadia recognized, on the condition that he recognized English authority and repaid the costs of Sedgwick's invasion. La Tour eventually sold proprietorship of Acadia to Thomas Temple and William Crowne in 1656, who governed the territory until the English relinquished Acadia back to France following the Second Anglo-Dutch War.

=== Anglo-Dutch Wars ===
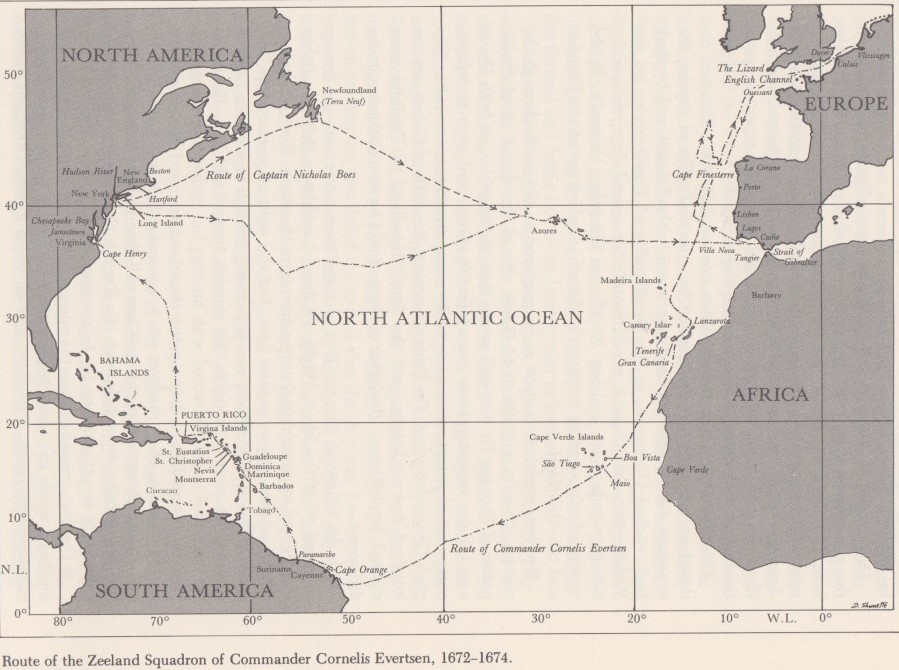
Route of the Dutch fleet raiding North America from 1672 to 1674.

The Second Anglo-Dutch War (1665–1667) resulted from tensions between England and the Dutch Republic, driven partly by competition over maritime dominance and trade routes. In 1664, Michiel de Ruyter was instructed to retaliate against the English seizures of Dutch East India Company assets in West Africa by attacking English ships. In 1665, his fleet raided English settlements and shipping, including St. John's, Newfoundland. The treaty that ended the conflict saw the English return Acadia to the French, a region they had seized in 1654.

In 1673, during the Third Anglo-Dutch War (1672–1674), a Dutch fleet raided English colonies in North America, including fishing fleets and shore facilities at Ferryland, Newfoundland.

=== Nine Years' War ===
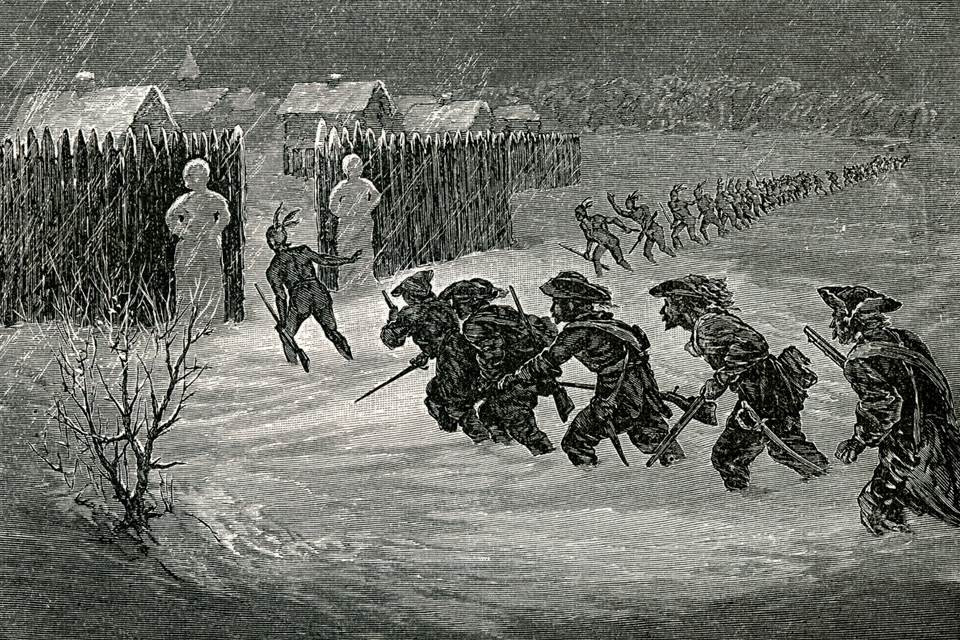
A French-First Nations expedition prepares to attack Schenectady in 1690

During the Nine Years' War (1688–1697), English and French forces clashed in North America. Governor General Frontenac initially devised an invasion to conquer the Province of New York to isolate the Haudenosaunee, although the plan was later scaled back. In February 1690, three New French-First Nations military expeditions were launched against New England. One attacked Schenectady, another raided Salmon Falls, while a third besieged Fort Loyal. New France also urged other First Nations allies to conduct raids along the English American frontier and promoted scalpings for psychological warfare.

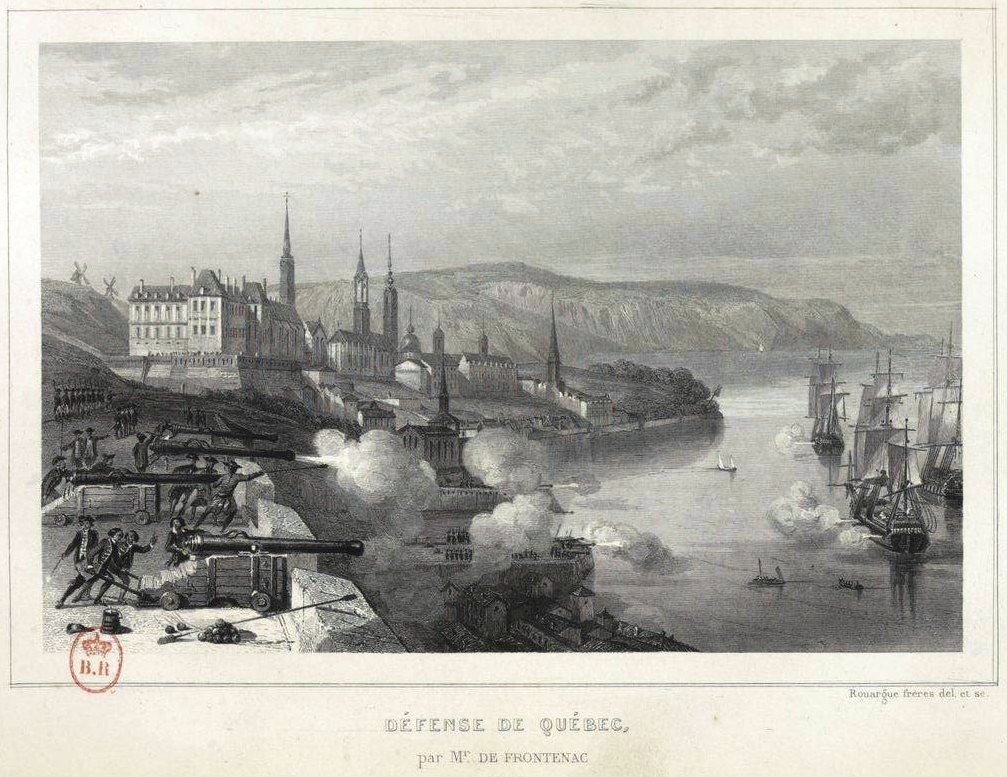
The batteries of Quebec City bombard the New England fleet during the Battle of Quebec in 1690.

After several attacks from New France's petite guerre, the English launched two retaliatory expeditions. In 1690, a naval expedition sailed to capture Quebec City, but poor planning delayed its arrival until mid-October, leaving little time to complete its objectives before the St. Lawrence River froze over. After a failed landing at Beauport, English forces withdrew. Another English expedition was repulsed at the Battle of La Prairie in 1691. The English also attacked Acadian settlements, including Port Royal, Chedabucto, Chignecto, and Fort Nashwaak.

In 1696, Pierre Le Moyne d'Iberville was tasked with attacking English fishing stations and expel the English from Newfoundland. Setting sail in November from Plaisance, the French administrative capital for the island, d'Iberville's forces razed St John's, destroyed English fisheries along Newfoundland's eastern shore, looted remote English hamlets and seized prisoners. By the end of March 1697, the French destroyed 36 settlements in Newfoundland, with Bonavista and Carbonear the only settlements on the island under English control.

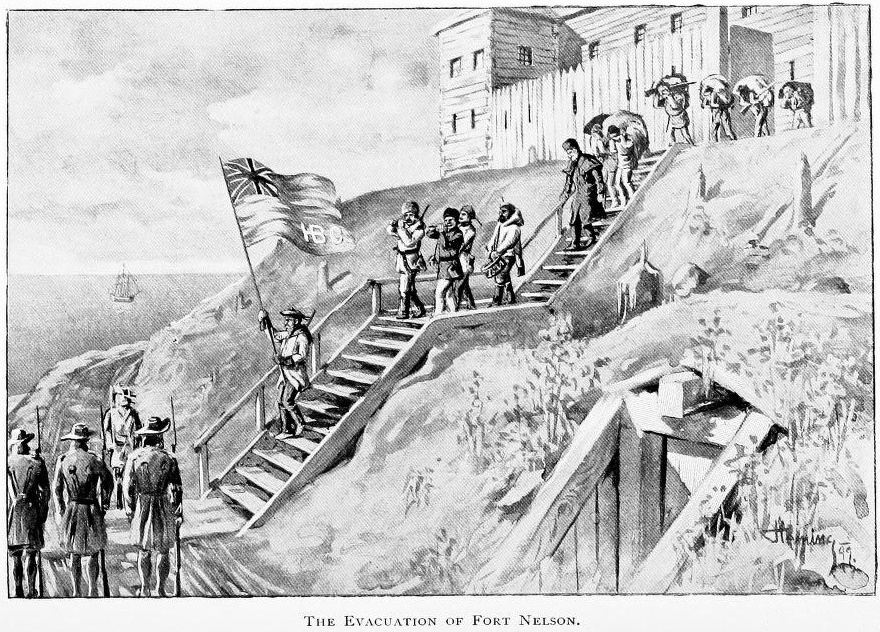
The Hudson's Bay Company garrison evacuates Fort Nelson shortly after the Battle of Hudson's Bay in 1697

During the war, the French strengthened their control over Hudson Bay, having already seized several HBC forts in an expedition two years before the war. French attempts to capture York Factory, HBC's only remaining fort around Hudson's Bay, included a failed effort in 1690 and its brief capture in 1694, although the English later recaptured the fort. The French finally secured York Factory after the Battle of Hudson's Bay in 1697.

The 1697 Peace of Ryswick ended the war, and required the return of territorial gains in North America. However, the HBC was forced to surrender all but one fort on Hudson Bay. After the peace, the English and French reinforced their alliances and trade relations with Indigenous groups. It also paved the way for the end of the Beaver Wars in 1701.

==== English-maritime Algonquians conflict ====
The Nine Years' War intersected with an ongoing conflict between the English and maritime Algonquians, who had been attacking English settlements in retaliation against their territorial encroachment shortly before the English-French conflict started.

French missionaries and settlers living in maritime Algonquian villages inflamed their hostilities with England to France's benefit. The French sabotaged English-maritime Algonquians peace talks in 1693, encouraging their ally to continue fighting. The French also encouraged the Abenaki and Mi'kmaq to engage in privateering or buccaneering with the French Navy, taking part in the naval battle off St. John and the second siege of Pemaquid in 1696.

== 18th century ==
Map of European claims on North America from the Peace of Utrecht in 1713 to the Treaty of Paris in 1763, with European forts and settlements also shown. British claims are in pink, while French claims are in blue. Purple areas were territories the French ceded to the British in 1713.

During the 18th century, the British–French struggle in Canada intensified as the rivalry worsened in Europe. The French government increased its military spending in its North American colonies, maintaining expansive garrisons at remote fur trading posts, improving the fortifications in Quebec City, and constructing a new fortified town on Île Royale, Louisbourg, dubbed the "Gibraltar of the North" or the "Dunkirk of America."

New France and the New England Colonies engaged in three wars during the 18th century. The first two of these conflicts, Queen Anne's War and King George's War, stemmed from broader European conflicts—the War of the Spanish Succession and the War of the Austrian Succession. The final conflict, the French and Indian War, began in the Ohio Valley, and evolved into the Seven Years' War. During this period, the Canadien petite guerre tactics ravaged northern towns and villages of New England and travelled as far south as Virginia and the Hudson Bay shore.

=== War of the Spanish Succession ===
During the War of the Spanish Succession, English and French forces clashed in North America in a conflict from 1702 to 1713. The conflict primarily focused on Acadia and New England, as Canada and New York informally agreed to remain neutral. Initially neutral, the French-aligned Abenaki were drawn into the conflict due to English hostilities.

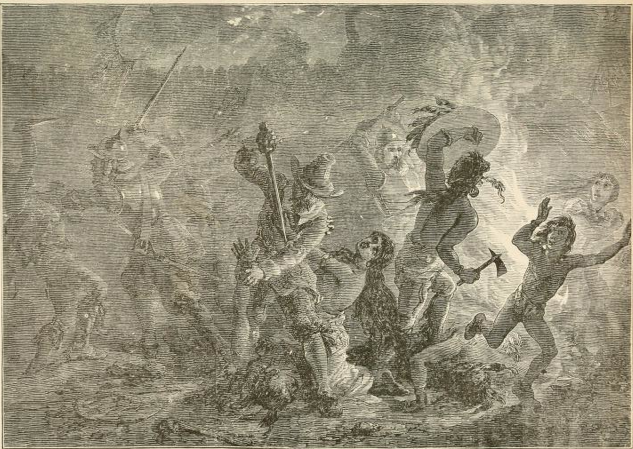
New Englanders raid Grand Pré in June 1704, in retaliation against an earlier French-First Nations raid on Deerfield

Raids between Acadians and New Englanders took place throughout the war, including the raid on Grand Pré in 1704 and the Battle of Bloody Creek in 1711. The raid on Grand Pré, launched by New England forces, was in retaliation for a French-First Nations raid on Deerfield in the British Province of Massachusetts Bay. Similar raids in Massachusetts included the raid on Haverhill. The French besieging St. John's in 1705 and captured the city after a battle in 1709.

The French suffered a major setback when the British captured the Acadian capital of Port-Royal after three-sieges. Although the French repelled two sieges in 1707, the British succeeded after a third siege in 1710. Building on this success, the British launched the Quebec Expedition to capture the capital of New France. However, the expedition was abandoned when its fleet was wrecked by the waters of the St. Lawrence River.

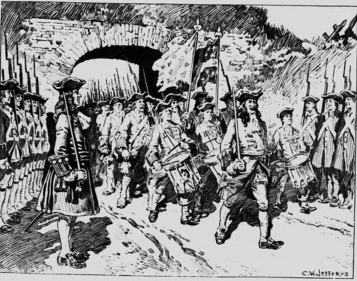
French forces withdraw from Port-Royal after the British successfully besieged the Acadian capital in 1710

The ensuing Peace of Utrecht saw the French surrender substantial North American territory. This included returning Hudson Bay lands to the HBC and relinquishing claims to Newfoundland and Acadia, though retaining fishing rights in parts of Newfoundland. However, due to a dispute over the size of Acadia, the French maintained control over its western portion (present-day New Brunswick). The French also continued its relationship with the Abenaki and Mi'kmaq in Acadia and encouraged them to attack the British. After the conflict, the French built the Fortress of Louisbourg to protect its remaining Acadian settlements on Île-Royale and Île Saint-Jean, while the British quickly built new outposts to secure its Acadian holdings.

=== Father Rale's War ===
Although British-French hostilities ended in 1713, conflict persisted between the maritime Algonquians and the British, with the Mi’kmaq seizing 40 British ships from 1715 to 1722. In May 1722 Lieutenant Governor John Doucett took 22 Mi'kmaq hostages to Annapolis Royal to prevent the capital from being attacked. In July, the Abenaki and Mi'kmaq initiated a blockade of Annapolis Royal, aiming to starve the capital. Due to increasing tensions, Massachusetts Governor Samuel Shute declared war on the Abenaki on July 22. Early engagements during the war took place in the Nova Scotia. In July 1724, 60 Mi'kmaq and Maliseets raided Annapolis Royal.

The treaty that ended the war marked a major change in European relations with the maritime Algonquians, as it granted the British the right to settle in traditional Abenaki and Mi'kmaq lands. The treaty was also the first formal recognition by a European power that its control over Nova Scotia was dependent on negotiation with its Indigenous inhabitants. The treaty was invoked as recently as 1999 in the Donald Marshall case.

=== Fox Wars ===
The Fox Wars, was an intermittent conflict from 1712 to the 1730s between New France and its Indigenous allies against the Meskwaki. The conflict highlighted how the New French military, supported by its allies, was able to inflict significant losses against enemies thousands of kilometres away from its Canadian core.

In response to Meskwaki raids on coureurs de bois and indigenous allies, particularly the Illinois, New French troops were deployed westward in 1716 to confront the Meskwaki. Despite initial success in forcing them to seek peace, the attacks continued. With diplomatic efforts failing in the 1720s, New France resolved to exterminate the Meskwaki. Subsequent campaigns, including an Illinois-led siege in 1730, led to the death or enslavement of many Meskwaki. A final punitive expedition by New France to present-day Iowa in 1735 failed due to lack of support from Indigenous allies, who deemed the Meskwaki adequately punished.

=== War of the Austrian Succession ===
British and French forces in North America clashed again in the War of the Austrian Succession from 1744 to 1748. While maritime Algonquians swiftly allied with the French, many Indigenous groups in the Great Lakes region hesitated to join, preferring to maintain trade ties with the British. These ties were deliberately fostered by the British prior to the war to weaken France's Indigenous alliances.

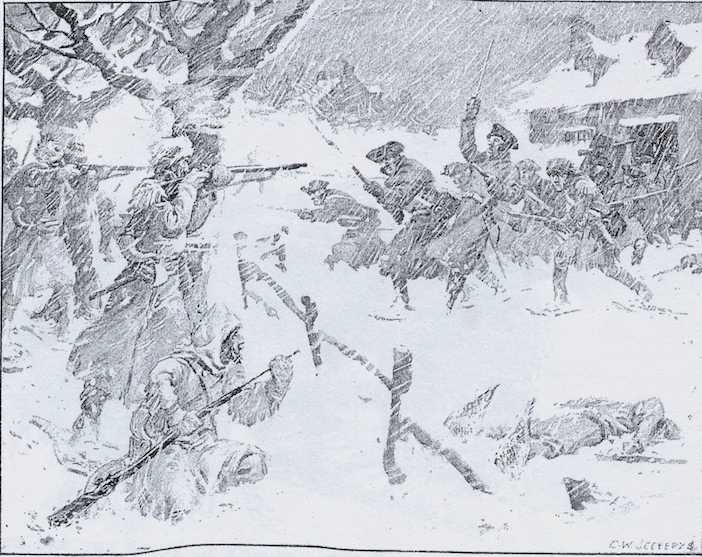
The French-Mi'kmaq raid on Grand Pré in 1747

Throughout the war, Acadians and Canadiens raided frontier British settlements, with Canso, Annapolis Royal, and Grand Pré among the Nova Scotian settlements attacked. French-Mohawk forces also attacked New England and New York, raiding Saratoga and besieging Fort Massachusetts. However, the Mohawk were unwilling to join French excursions deeper into New York to avoid conflicts with other members of the Haudenosaunee Confederacy.

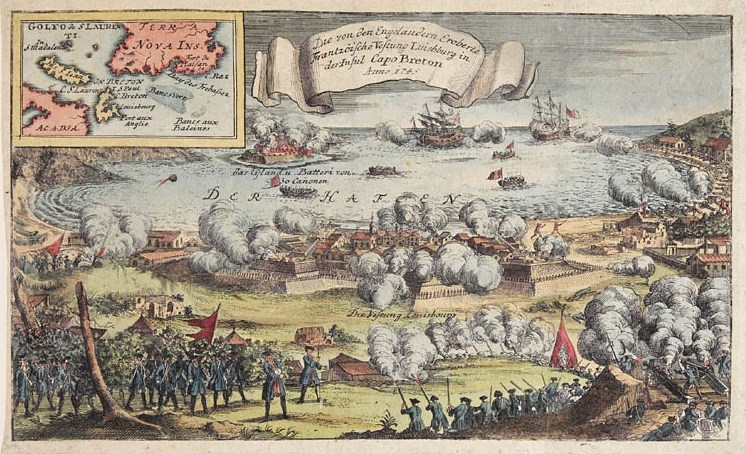
The British siege of Louisbourg in 1745. The fortress was captured after several weeks.

In 1745, a British-New England force besieged and captured Louisbourg. The capture of Louisbourg significantly weakened Franco-Indigenous alliances around the Great Lakes as it isolated Quebec City from France and interrupted trade. As a result, the price of goods skyrocketed and the French could not provide annual gifts to secure its alliances. This caused some Indigenous nations to end their support for the French war effort, viewing the absence of gifts as a breach of alliance terms. The largest military expedition to sail from Europe for the Americas was launched by the French in 1746, aiming to recapture Louisbourg. However, the expedition was unsuccessful due to adverse weather and illness affecting its troops.

Although Louisbourg was captured, the British failed to advance further into New France after its forces were defeated at Port-la-Joye in 1746. The 1748 Treaty of Aix-la-Chapelle ended the war and saw Louisbourg returned to France in exchange for territories in the Low Countries and India. The forfeiture of Louisbourg outraged New Englanders. To combat France's continued presence in Acadia, the British established the military settlement of Halifax and Citadel Hill in 1749.

=== Father Le Loutre's War ===
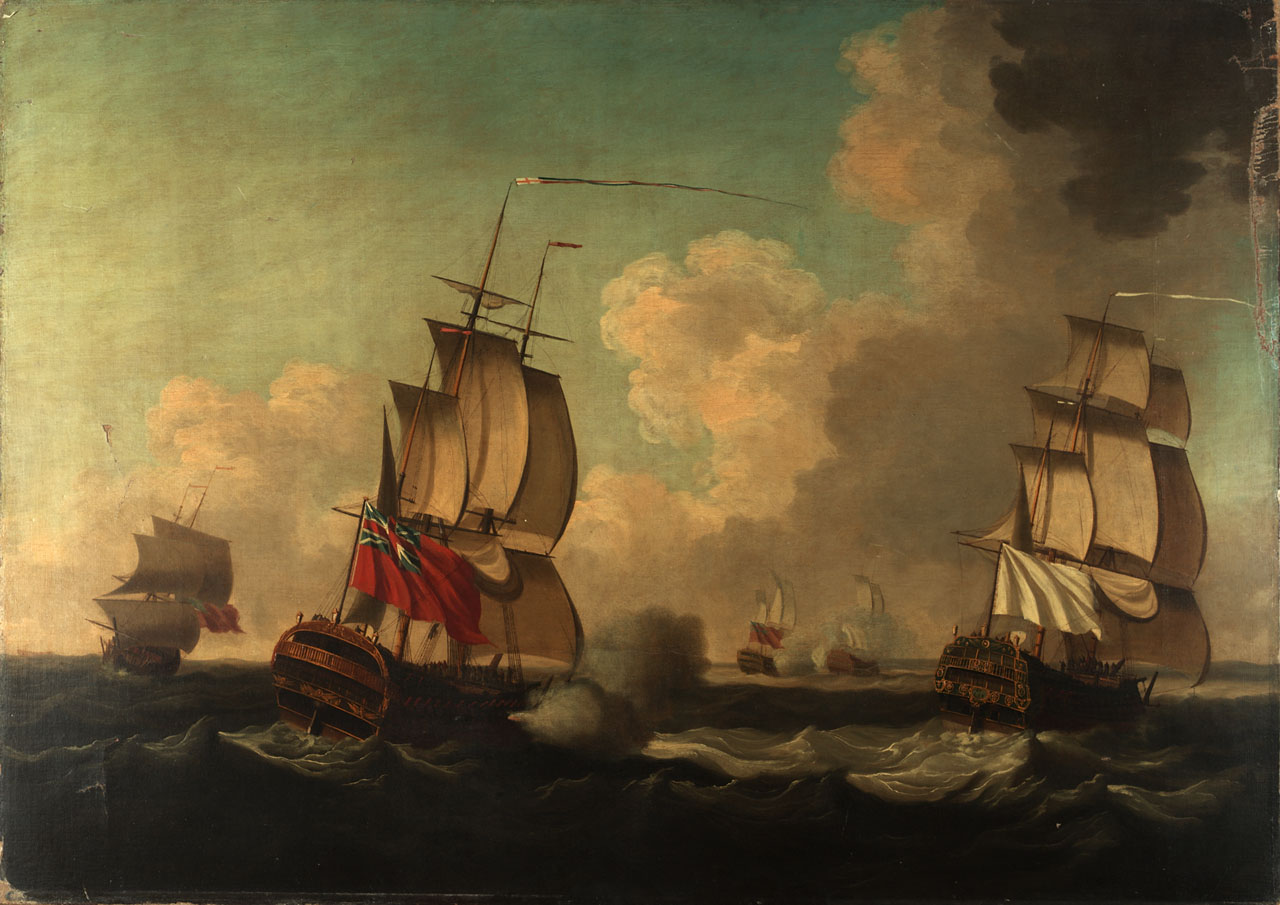
The Royal Navy capture French ships carrying war supplies to the Acadians and Mi'kmaq in June 1755

Father Le Loutre's War (1749–1755) took place in Acadia and Nova Scotia, with the Mi'kmaq and Acadians, under the leadership of French priest Jean-Louis Le Loutre, opposing British and New England settlers, led by figures like John Gorham and Charles Lawrence. The Mi'kmaq and Acadians attacked British forts and newly established Protestant settlements to hinder British expansion and support France's Acadian resettlement efforts.

After Halifax was established by the British, the Acadians and Mi'kmaq attacked Chignecto, Grand-Pré, Dartmouth, Canso, Halifax and Country Harbour. The French erected forts at present-day Saint John, Chignecto and Fort Gaspareaux. The British responded by attacking the Mi'kmaq and Acadians at Mirligueche, Chignecto and St. Croix, and building forts in Acadian communities at Windsor, Grand-Pré, and Chignecto. The conflict in Acadia ended after the British victory at Fort Beauséjour and Le Loutre's subsequent capture in 1755.

Acadia and Nova Scotia experienced unprecedented fortification building and troop deployments during the conflict, along with a mass exodus of Acadians and Mi'kmaq from Nova Scotia to the neighbouring French colonies of Île Saint-Jean and Île Royale.

=== Seven Years' War ===
Map of North American military campaigns during the Seven Years' War.

New French-British colonial hostilities culminated in the Seven Years' War. Although formal hostilities between France and Britain began in 1756, fighting erupted in North America in 1754 in what became known as the French and Indian War (1754–1760). Disputes over the Ohio Country prompted the French to construct a series forts in 1753, sparking hostilities with neighbouring British colonies in 1754.

Most First Nations supported the French, largely due to their opposition to earlier British territorial policies. The British worked to undermine the Franco-Indigenous alliances by seeking the latter's neutrality through Haudenosaunee intermediaries. The Haudenosaunee Confederacy eventually entered the conflict as a British ally at the Battle of Fort Niagara in 1759.

==== Early French success and Acadia ====
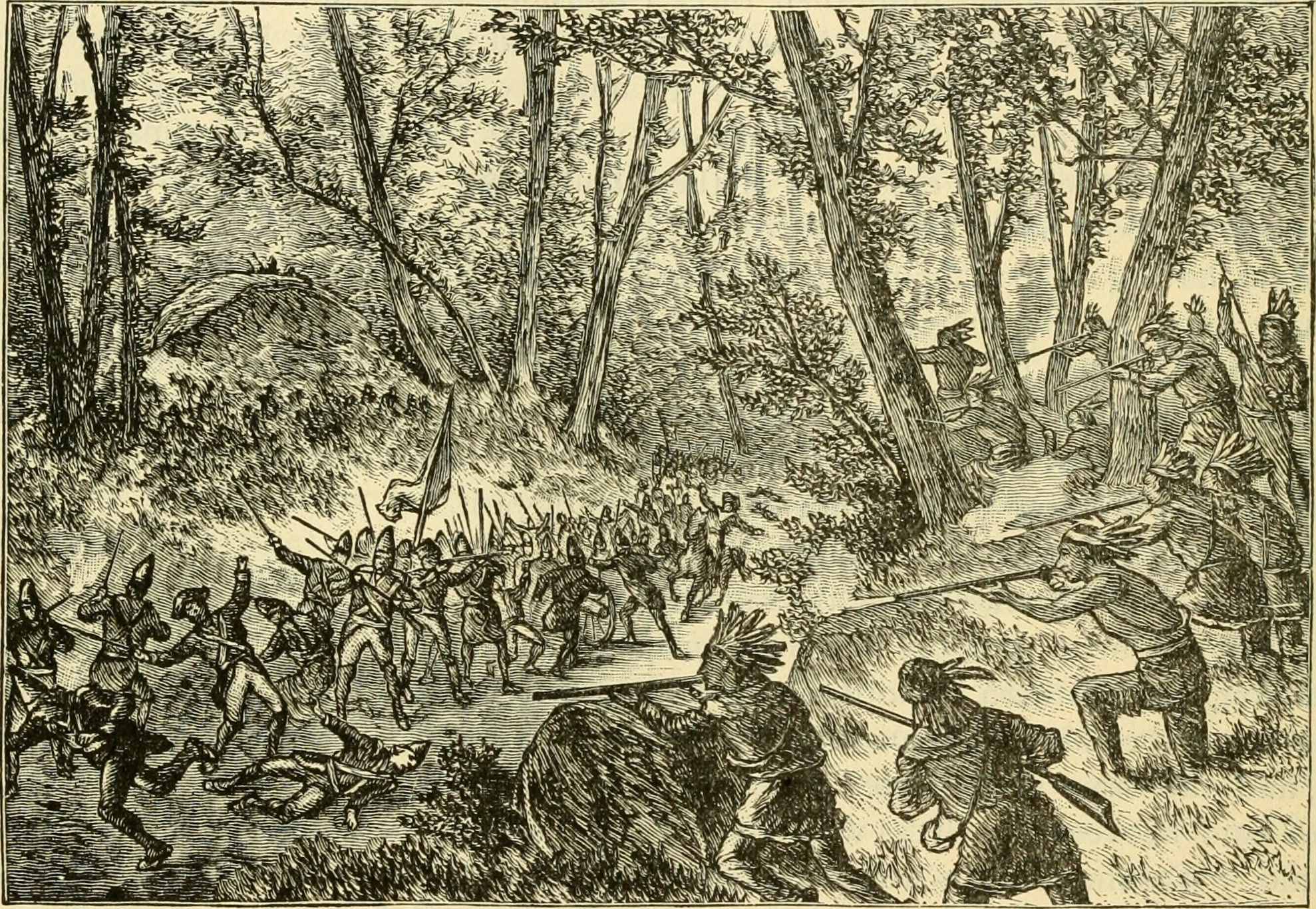
French-First Nations forces ambush the British at the Battle of the Monongahela, 1755

In 1754, the British planned a four-pronged attack against New France, with attacks planned against Fort Niagara on the Niagara River, Fort Saint-Frédéric on Lake Champlain, Fort Duquesne on the Ohio River, and Fort Beauséjour at the border of French-held Acadia. The plan fell apart as forces sent to capture Niagara and Saint-Frédéric abandoned their campaigns, and the Braddock Expedition sent to capture Duquesne was defeated at Monongahela by a New French-First Nations force. Although most of the plan had failed, the army sent to Acadia was successful at the Battle of Fort Beauséjour. After Beauséjour, the British worked to consolidate control over Acadia, neutralizing the Acadians military potency and disrupting supply lines to Louisbourg, starting with the Bay of Fundy campaign in 1755. These campaigns resulted in the forced relocation of over 12,000 Acadians from Acadia during the war.

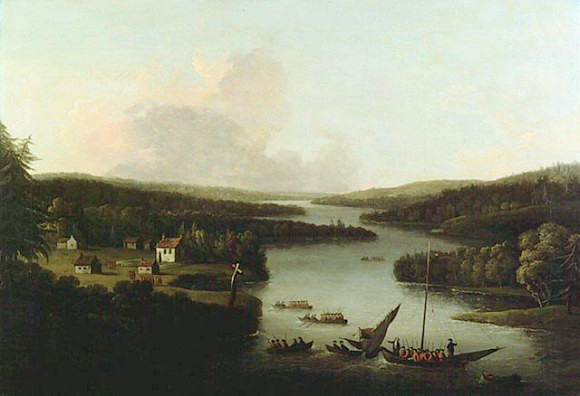
A 1758 raid on an Acadian village during a campaign to expel the Acadians from Acadia.

In 1756, following the formal declaration of war between the British and French, the commander-in-chief of New France, Pierre de Rigaud, marquis de Vaudreuil-Cavagnial, devised a strategy to keep the British on the defensive and away from the populated areas of New France, like Canada. This resulted in French offensives like the Battle of Fort Oswego and siege of Fort William Henry, and raids on British frontier settlements by the Canadian militia and First Nations allies. A small French army, supported by the militia and First Nations allies, effectively pinned down British forces at its frontier, prompting the dispatch of 20,000 additional soldiers to reinforce British America. Despite early success in tying down British forces, the French were hindered by limited resources, as most of France's army was engaged in Europe, unable to reinforce its colony.

==== British conquest of New France ====
In July 1758, the British renewed its offensive against New France, although its initial invasion force of 15,000 soldiers were defeated by a force of 3,800 soldiers near Fort Carillon. However, in the following weeks, the French positioned worsened. The British captured Louisbourg after a month-long siege in June–July 1758 and destroyed the French supply stock at Fort Frontenac in August 1758. The French were also compelled abandon Fort Duquesne when some of their First Nations allies ageed to a separate peace agreement with the British.

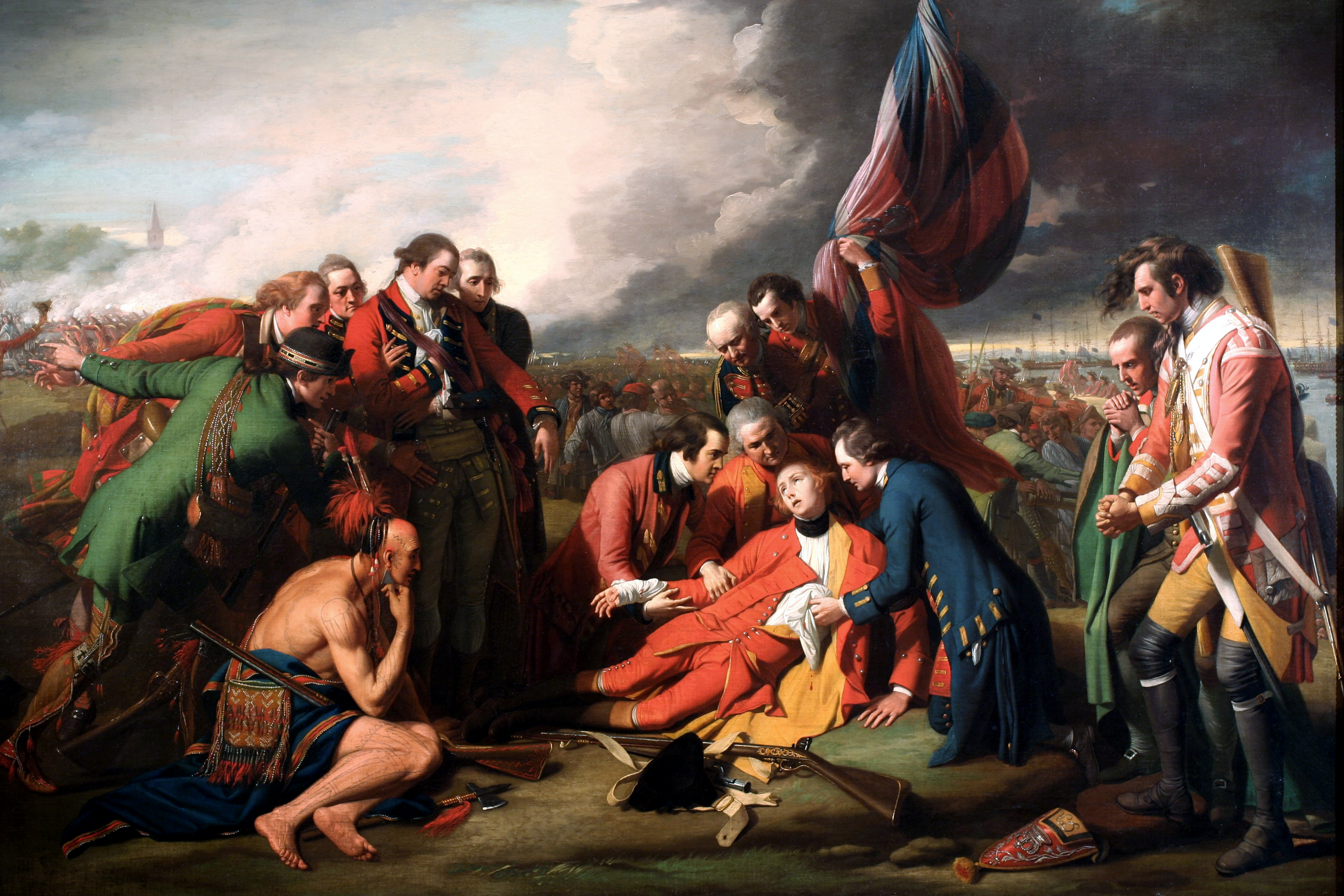
The Death of General Wolfe by Benjamin West depicts the death of the General moments before the British victory at the Battle of the Plains of Abraham in 1759

Following these victories, the British launched three campaigns against Canada: the first two targeted Niagara and Lake Champlain, while the third targeted Quebec City. After the French repelled the latter invasion force at the Battle of Beauport, British commander Major-General James Wolfe opted to besiege Quebec City. The three-month siege culminated in the Battle of the Plains of Abraham in September 1759, where French general Louis-Joseph de Montcalm led a numerically inferior force out of the walled city to face the British. The French were defeated, with both Wolfe and Montcalm killed in battle.

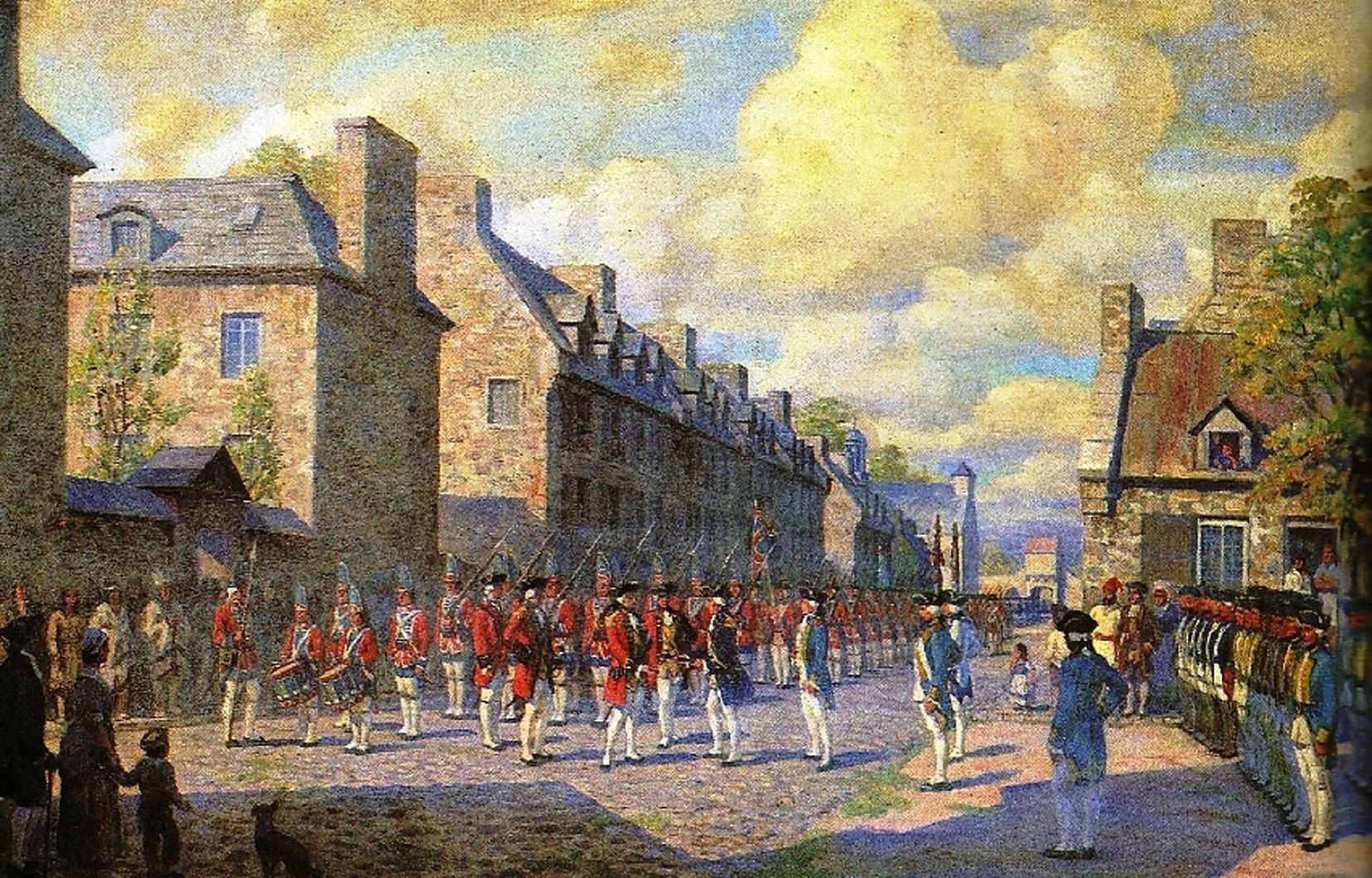
The French Army surrender shortly after the fall of Montreal

In April 1760, the French launched a campaign to retake Quebec City, defeating the British at the Battle of Sainte-Foy. After the battle, the British withdrew into the walls of Quebec City's. The French besieged the city until May, when a British naval force defeated a French naval unit supporting the siege at the Battle of Pointe-aux-Trembles. The arrival of the British Royal Navy left New France virtually isolated from France. As a result, the remaining French Army retreated to Montreal and, after its fall, signed the Articles of Capitulation on 8 September, marking the completion of the British conquest of New France. A week later, the British made peace with the Seven Nations of Canada, followed by France's maritime Algonquian allies in 1761.

British naval supremacy was pivotal in the war's outcome, facilitating the capture of Louisbourg and Quebec City and blocking French reinforcements to the colony. This led to significant territorial concessions by France in the Treaty of Paris of 1763, including New France. However, the war burdened Britain with a massive financial debt. The absence of the French military threat also emboldened residents of the Thirteen Colonies, who no longer needed to rely on the British for military protection against the French.

=== Pontiac's War ===
After the Seven Years' War, tensions on Britain's North American frontier flared when an alliance of First Nations led by Odawa chief Pontiac sought to expel the British from the Great Lakes and Ohio Country. The alliance was forced into a protracted siege of Fort Detroit after learning the British knew of their plans. The siege prompted other Odawa-aligned nations to attack nearby British posts. This led to a British military response that included a 300-man battalion of French Canadians under former Troupes de la Marine officers, deployed as part of Brigadier-General John Bradstreet's expedition.

The alliance's failure to seize Fort Detroit weakened the resistance, and peace was restored through diplomacy, including the distribution of traditional gifts and the issuance of the Royal Proclamation of 1763 by the British. The proclamation reorganized the region by creating the Province of Quebec and the Indian Reserve, and also recognized Indigenous land rights. Intended to stabilize the frontier and guide its "gradual settlement," it also made Britain an obstacle to the territorial ambitions of the Thirteen Colonies, a role previously held by France.

=== American Revolutionary War ===
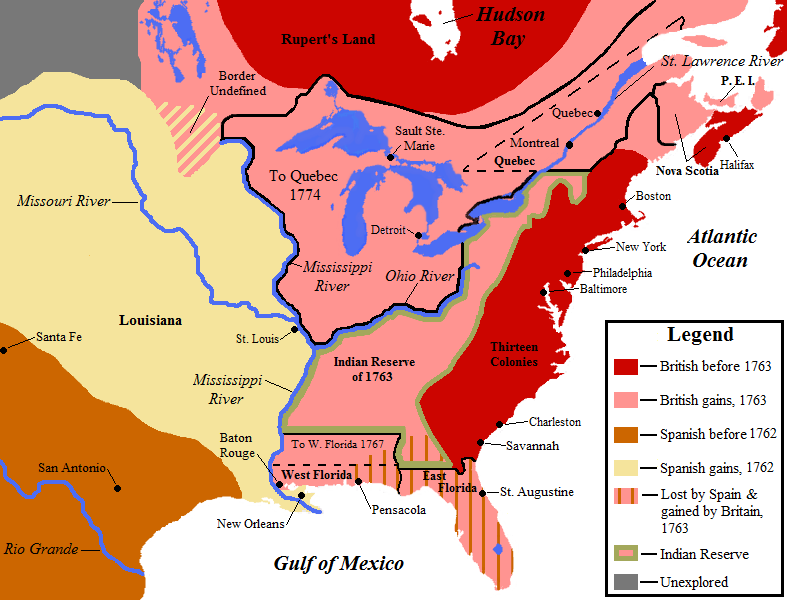
British America from 1763 to the American Revolutionary War

After the Seven Years' War, the Thirteen Colonies became restive over taxes imposed by the British Parliament, with many questioning its necessity when they no longer needed to pay for a large military force to counter the French. American frustrations intensified following the passage of the Quebec Act, which restored Catholic rights in Quebec, much to the ire of the anti-Catholic Protestant-based Thirteen Colonies. The act also expanded Quebec's territory to include portions of the Indian Reserve, such as the Ohio Country, long desired by British colonies like Pennsylvania and Virginia. These tensions led to a political revolution in the Thirteen Colonies, and eventually, the American Revolutionary War (1775–1783), with American rebels aiming to break free from the British parliament, and assert their claim on the Ohio Country.

==== Quebec and Nova Scotia ====
At the war's start, most people in Quebec and the Maritime colonies remained neutral, hesitant to join either the Americans or the British side. Early in the war, revolutionaries launched a propaganda campaign in the Canadian colonies, although it only attracted limited support. British attempts to raise a militia in Quebec also saw limited success, although they were able to rely on the French Canadian clergy, landowners, and other leading citizens for support. The British received support from the Seven Nations of Canada and the Haudenosaunee Confederacy, though the latter sought to remain neutral due to an internal civil conflict.

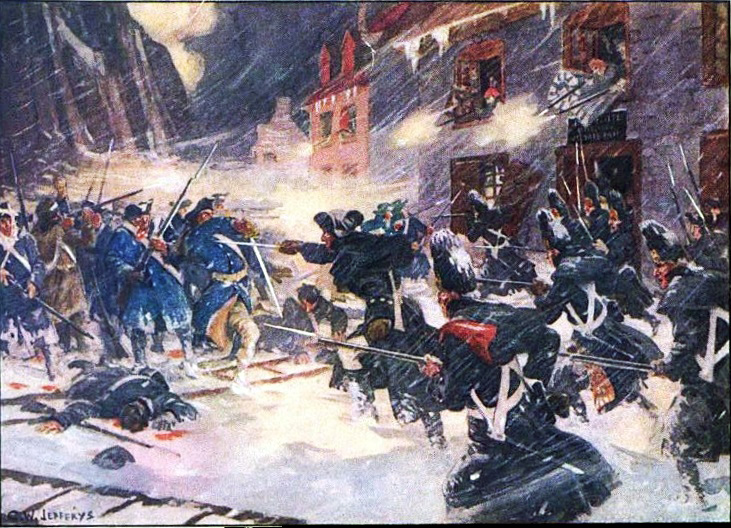
British regulars and Canadian militia repulse an American column in the street at the Battle of Quebec in 1775.

In September 1775, American forces invaded Quebec, beginning with the capture of Fort Ticonderoga and the siege of Fort St. Jean near Montreal. The siege prompted Governor Guy Carleton to abandon Montreal for Quebec City. The Continental Army advanced towards Quebec City, where they were joined by Benedict Arnold's expedition. On New Year's Eve, they attacked the city but were repelled. After the failed assault, the Americans besieged Quebec until spring 1776, when they were routed by a British naval force sent to relieve Quebec. The Americans subsequently abandoned Montreal, and their remaining forces were defeated at the Battle of Trois-Rivières in June 1776. British forces, led by General John Burgoyne, pursued the retreating Americans out of Quebec into New York in a counter-invasion.

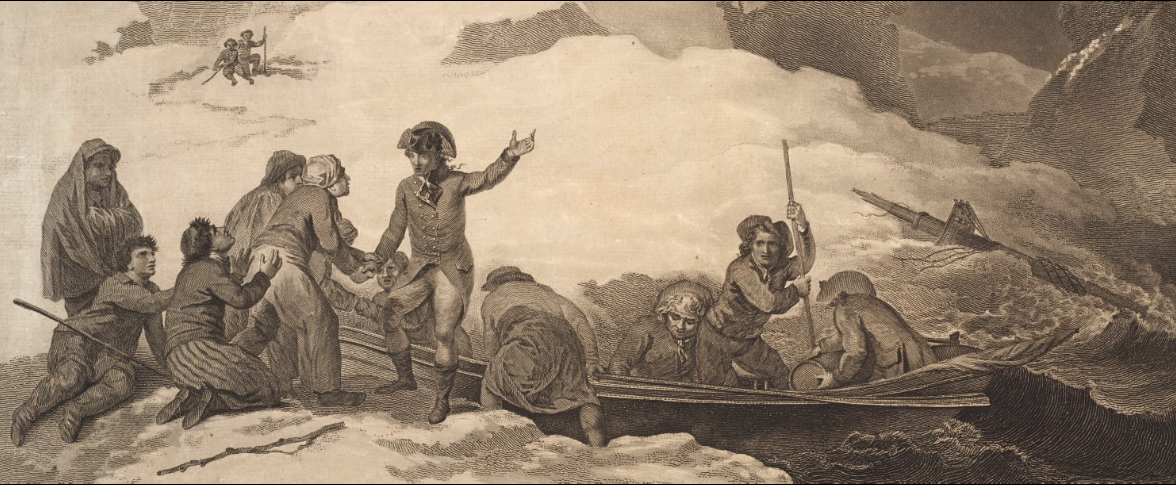
The British 84th Regiment of Foot in Nova Scotia. The regiment was raised in the Canadian colonies during the American Revolutionary War.

Although the Canadien militia formed most of Quebec City's defenders during the invasion, they saw limited action beyond Quebec. British reluctance to deploy them elsewhere stemmed from uncertainty about their loyalty when faced with the French Army. Five British provincial corps, augmented by additional unincorporated units and Loyalist associators, were raised in the Canadian colonies to assist in its defence and harass the American frontier. First Nations allies, led by Thayendanegea, also raided US border settlements from 1778 to war's end.

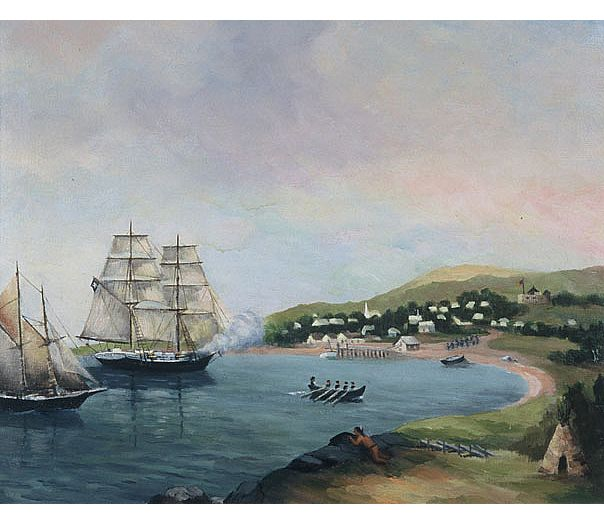
The American raid on Lunenburg in 1782. Raids by US privateers devastated the maritime Nova Scotian economy.

New Englanders attempted to incite a revolt in Nova Scotia but were defeated at the battles of Fort Cumberland in 1776 and St. John in 1777. Although they failed to incite a revolt, Nova Scotia remained a target of American privateering throughout the war, with most coastal outposts being attacked. Attacks like the 1782 raid on Lunenburg had a devastating effect on the colony's maritime economy. American privateers seized 225 vessels departing from or arriving at Nova Scotian ports in total. The French Navy also attacked a British naval convoy off Nova Scotia in July 1781. Conversely, the British captured American privateers off Nova Scotia's coast, such as in the 1782 battle off Halifax. They also used the colony as a staging ground to launch attacks against New England, as seen in the Battle of Machias.

==== Consequences ====
The revolutionaries' failure to seize the Canadian colonies and their continued loyalty to the British fragmented Britain's North American empire. Despite successfully defending Quebec and Nova Scotia, British military defeats in the Thirteen Colonies led to their surrender in 1781 and the subsequent recognition of the independent US republic in the Treaty of Paris of 1783.

Suspicions against the US persisted in the Canadian colonies for decades. Over 75,000 Loyalists, comprising 15 per cent of residents in the Thirteen Colonies who supported the Crown, migrated north to the remaining parts of British North America. The British also ceded the Indian Reserve south of the Great Lakes to the newly formed United States. As the ceded area included traditional Haudenosaunee territory, the British offered land in Quebec to the Haudenosaunee, hoping to establish new Haudenosaunee communities that would serve as a barrier against the Americans.

=== Northwest Indian War ===
After the American Revolution, Britain maintained seven forts in the American Northwest Territory to preserve its influence over First Nations in the region. American settlers opposed this continued presence, suspecting British support for Indigenous raids in the territory. Although Britain initially urged local First Nations to seek peace with the US, the Northwestern Confederacy's victory over US forces at the Battle of the Wabash in 1791 prompted officials in the British Army and Indian Department to support the resistance and promote the creation of a First Nations buffer state to deter US expansion and protect Upper Canada.

According to Isaac Weld, some Canadians, primarily of mixed European and First Nations descent, discreetly fought alongside the Confederacy at Wabash. By 1794, British soldiers and French Canadian militiamen volunteered to fight with the Confederacy at Fort Recovery and Fallen Timbers, disguising themselves as First Nations. The Confederacy's defeat at Fallen Timbers revealed Britain's reluctance to intervene, prompting Confederacy members to sign the Treaty of Greenville with the US in 1795. Britain also normalized relations with the US through the Jay Treaty and withdrew from the Northwest Territory.

=== French Revolutionary Wars ===
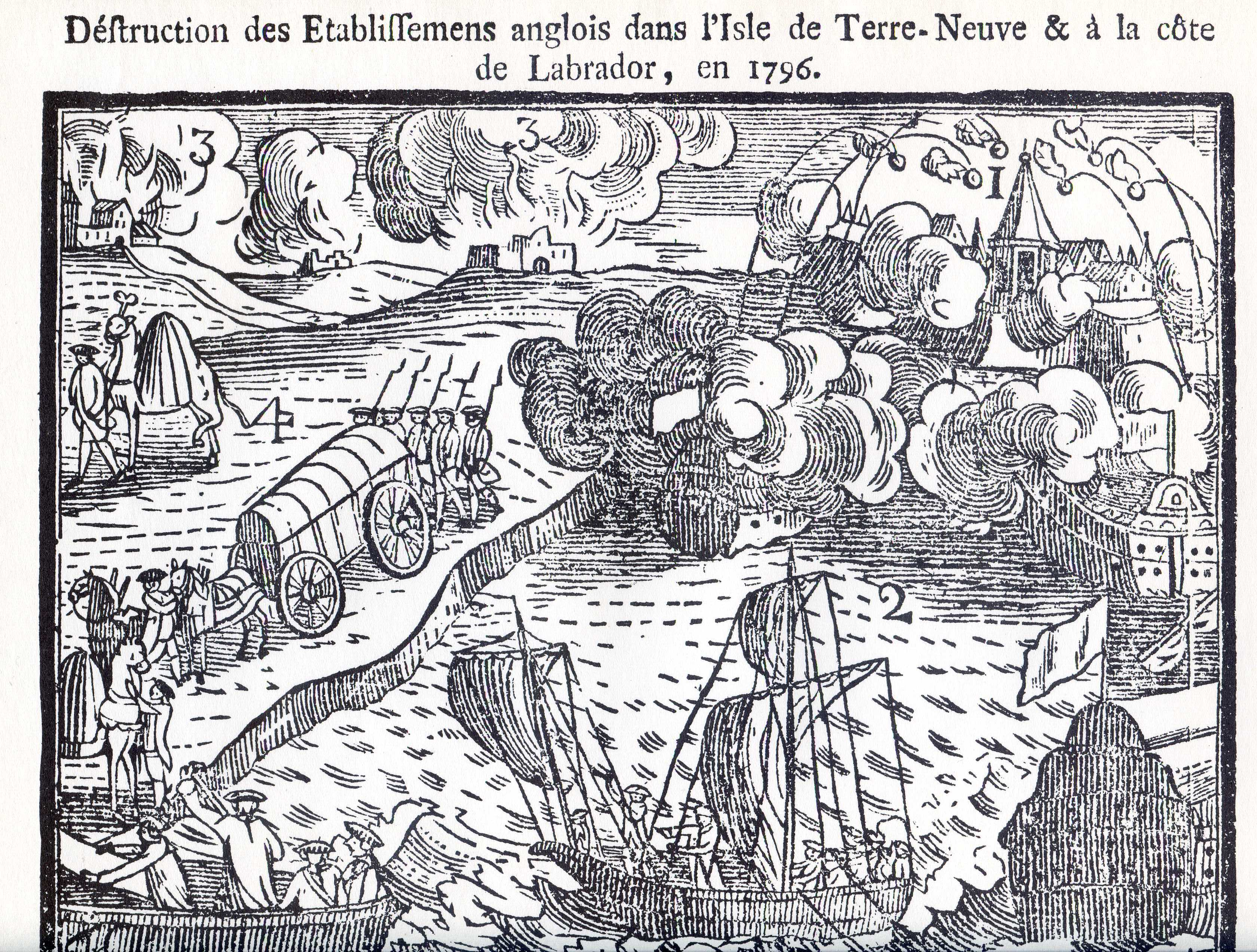
French forces raiding Newfoundland in 1796

In 1796, during the War of the First Coalition, a naval expedition under Joseph de Richery attacked Newfoundland. De Richery initially planned to attack St. John's, but abandoned the plan after his forces failed to unite with another naval squadron from Brest and were deterred by the mobilized local defence. Instead, his squadron disrupted the island's fisheries and razed Bay Bulls and Petty Harbour.

== 19th century ==
A form of compulsory military service continued in the Canadas into the 19th century, with legislation in Lower Canada in 1803 and Upper Canada in 1808 extending the militia age range from 16 to 60. However, in practice, the compulsory sedentary militia was mobilized solely during emergencies. In peacetime, service involved a one to two-day annual muster parade.

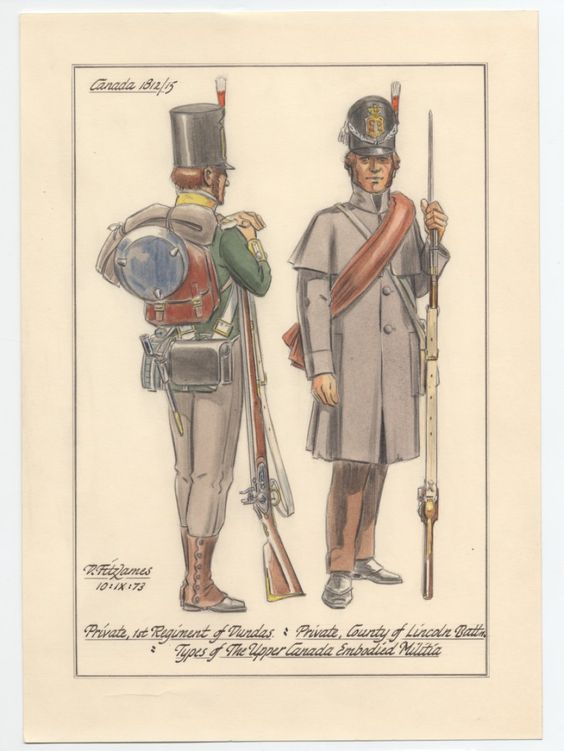
Depiction of a Dundas County militiaman, c. 1812–15

The role of the militia during the American Revolution and War of 1812 led to the "citizen soldier" becoming a unique symbol of adulation in 19th-century Canadian military culture. This veneration stands in contrast with the United States and other British settler colonies, and led to the "militia myth" in the 19th-century Canadian zeitgeist, a belief that it did not need a standing army for its defence, as it could rely on its inhabitants to mobilize into militias overnight. This belief created a tendency to ignore the need for rigorous militia training during peacetime.

=== War of 1812 ===
Anglo-American tensions continued into the 19th century and were exacerbated during the Napoleonic Wars by Britain's naval blockade of France and the impressment of US sailors they claimed were deserters. Unable to challenge the Royal Navy, the US proposed invading Canada as a means to strike Britain, and to end British support for Indigenous resistance in its western frontier. Support from congressional war hawks and optimistic assessments of invading Canada by US officers, including Major General Henry Dearborn, led to the US declaring war on the UK in June 1812.

US strategy targeted a vulnerable Upper Canada, as the Maritime colonies were well-defended and Lower Canada's capital was considered too remote and fortified. At the war's outset, Upper Canada's defenses were minimal, comprising 1,600 regular troops, Indigenous allies, and Canadian units raised for the conflict, including the Provincial Marine, Fencibles, and militia units like Captain Runchey's Company of Coloured Men.

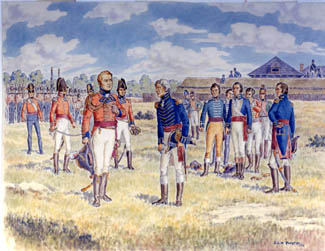
The surrender of the US garrison at Fort Detroit, after British-First Nations forces besieged the fort in 1812

Believing a bold move was needed to rally support in Upper Canada, Major-General Isaac Brock quickly ordered a British-First Nations siege on Fort Mackinac and advanced to Amherstburg to confront the invading US Army, only to find they had retreated to Detroit. The American retreat allowed Brock to form an alliance with Shawnee chief Tecumseh and abandon his defensive orders, leading to the capture of Detroit and occupation of the Michigan Territory by British-First Nations forces.

In October 1812, British-First Nations forces repelled an American crossing of the Niagara River at the Battle of Queenston Heights, though Brock was killed in the battle. Despite Brock's successes, his death led the British to adopt a defensive stance, with Governor General George Prevost concentrating the strongest garrisons in Lower Canada and reinforcing Upper Canada only as additional troops arrived from overseas. An American attempt to retake Detroit was defeated in January 1813, ending that winter's threat to Canada.

==== 1813 ====
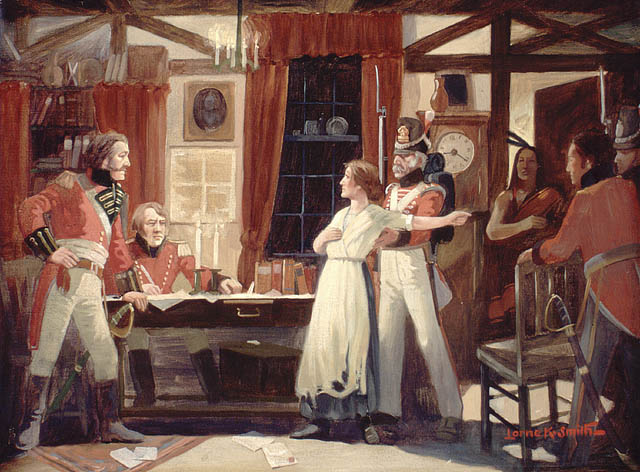
Laura Secord warns the British of an impending American attack on Beaver Dams in 1813.

In April 1813, an American naval squadron attacked and captured York, briefly occupying and burning parts of the Upper Canadian capital. They then captured Fort George in May. However, the retreating British regrouped and defeated US forces at the battles of Stoney Creek and Beaver Dams. American forces withdrew to the US in December after setting Fort George and Niagara ablaze. In retaliation, the British razed parts of Buffalo during the battle and continued similar reprisals into 1814, like in Washington.

Although the British defended the Niagara Peninsula in 1813, they suffered setbacks in the western frontier after the failed siege of Fort Meigs and the loss of control of the Upper Great Lakes after the Battle of Lake Erie. Following the naval defeat, British-First Nations forces withdrew from the Michigan Territory. However, the retreating force was routed at the Battle of the Thames. Tecumseh's death during the battle fractured his confederacy and their alliance with the British.

In late 1813, two American invasion forces against Lower Canada were repelled, with one stopped at the Battle of the Chateauguay in October by British-First Nations forces and another at the Battle of Crysler's Farm in November.

==== 1814 ====
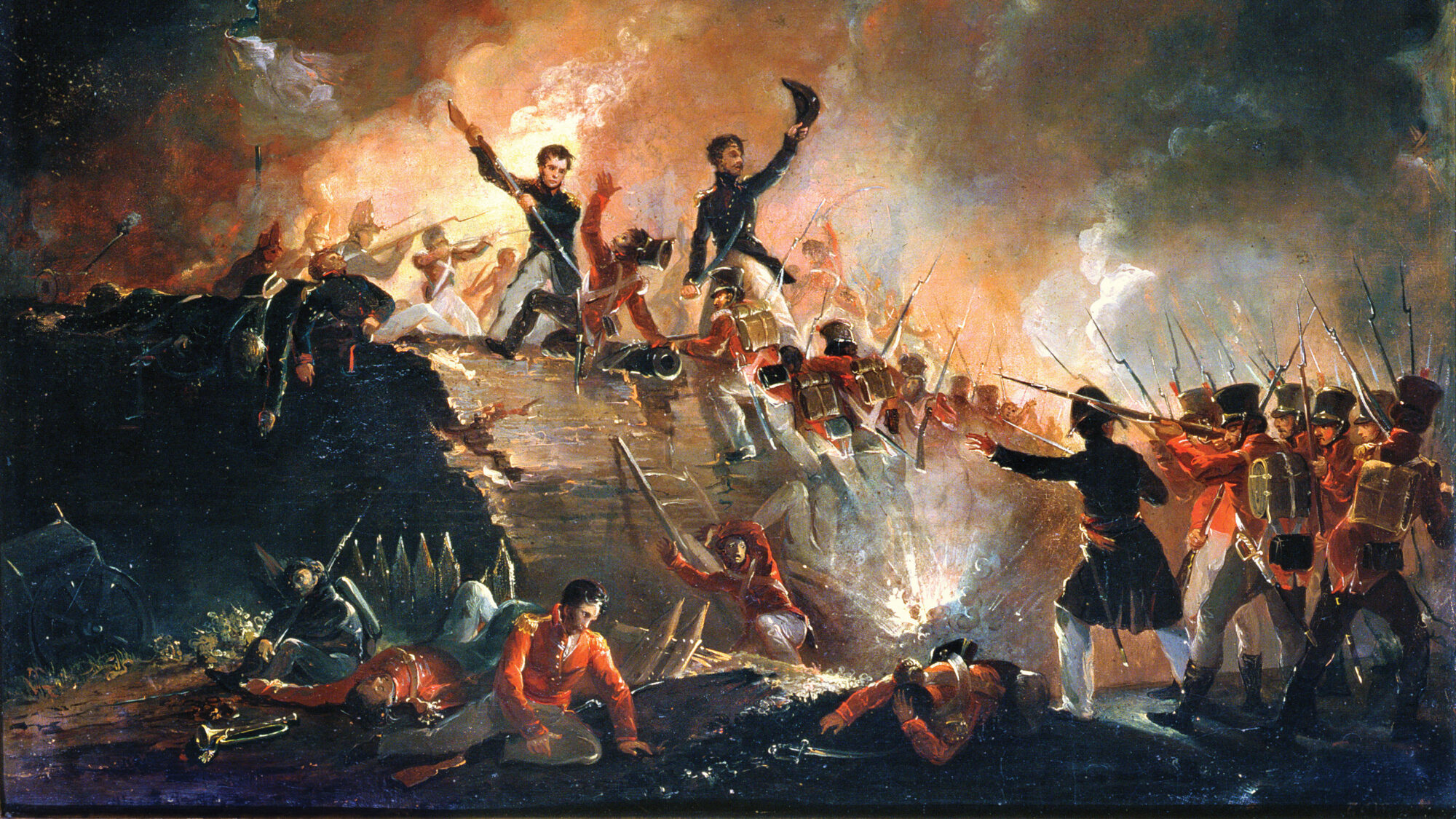
A British night assault against American positions at Fort Erie during the siege of the fort in 1814

The final incursions into the Canadas occurred in 1814, when US forces crossed the Niagara River in July and captured Fort Erie. The US advance led to the Battle of Lundy's Lane. While ending in a stalemate, the exhausted Americans withdrew to Fort Erie, where they successfully withstood a British siege before withdrawing back to the US in September.

By September 1814, the British regained the initiative, securing Lake Huron and establishing effective control over Lake Ontario with HMS St Lawrence, a first-rate that deterred American naval actions from its September launch to the war's end. In the Atlantic, British naval efforts were supported by Nova Scotian privateer ships raiding US shipping. The most notable Nova Scotian privateer ship, the Liverpool Packet, captured 50 ships by war's end.

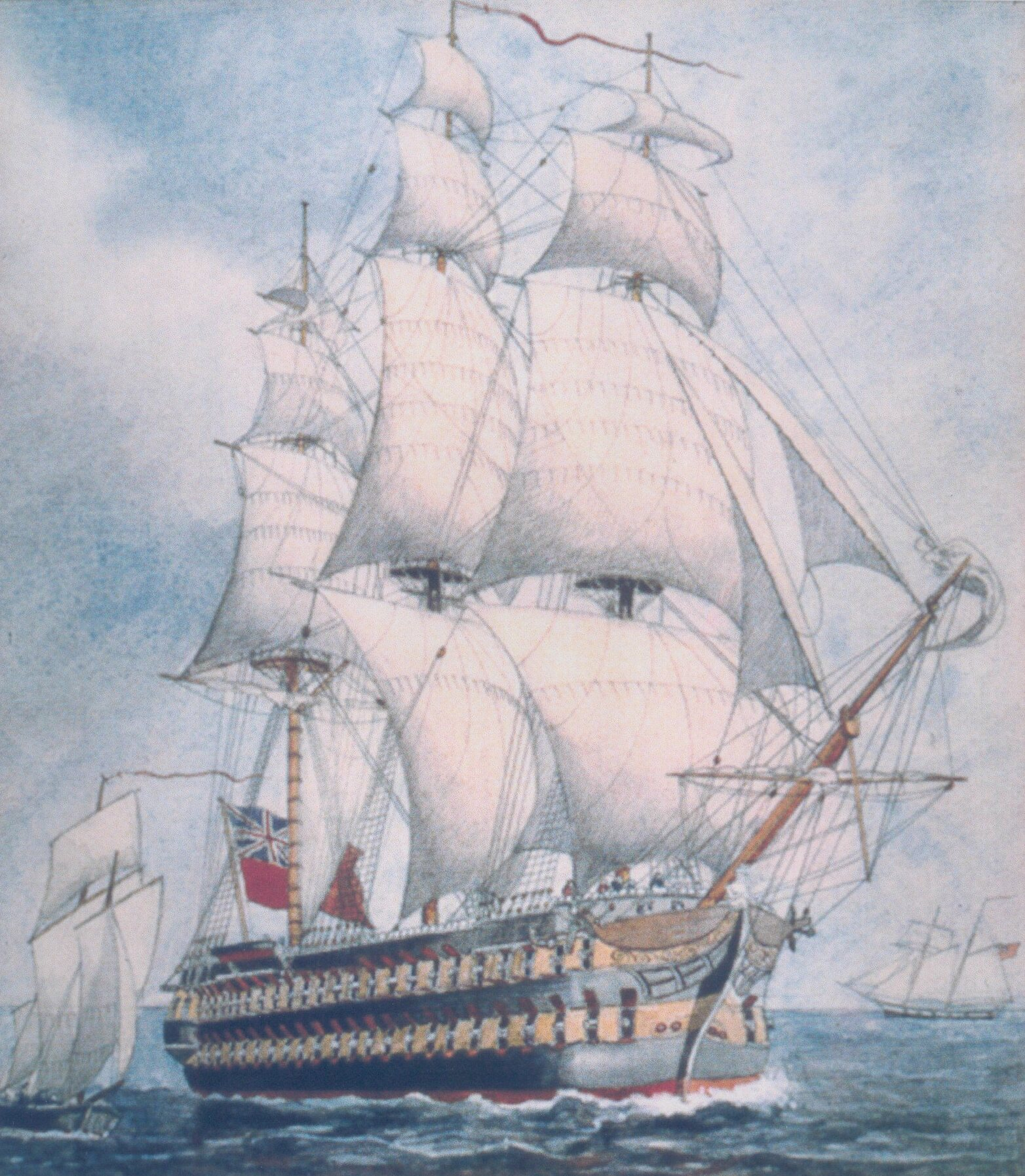
HMS St Lawrence, a Royal Navy first-rate launched in Lake Ontario in September 1814

The end of the War of the Sixth Coalition in 1814 allowed Britain to focus on the war with the US, with Lower Canada and Nova Scotia used as staging areas. The force gathered in Lower Canada invaded northern New York but was repelled at the Battle of Plattsburgh in September, while the force gathered in Halifax successfully captured most of Maine's coastline by mid-September.

The Treaty of Ghent, signed in December 1814, ended the conflict and restored the territorial status quo, though fighting continued into 1815 in areas unaware of the peace. The war fostered a sense of community in Canadian colonies and set the stage for Canada's future nationhood. For the First Nations, the conflict was especially consequential, given the collapse of Tecumseh's confederacy in 1813 and the loss of British support for a First Nations buffer state during peace negotiations.

=== Pemmican War ===
In 1812, the Red River Colony was established by the HBC despite protest from the North West Company (NWC), who already operated the nearby trading post, Fort Gibraltar. In January 1814, the colony issued the Pemmican Proclamation, banning the export of pemmican and other provisions for a year to secure its growth. The NWC and local Métis voyageurs that traded with them opposed the ban, viewing it as a move by the HBC to control their food supply.

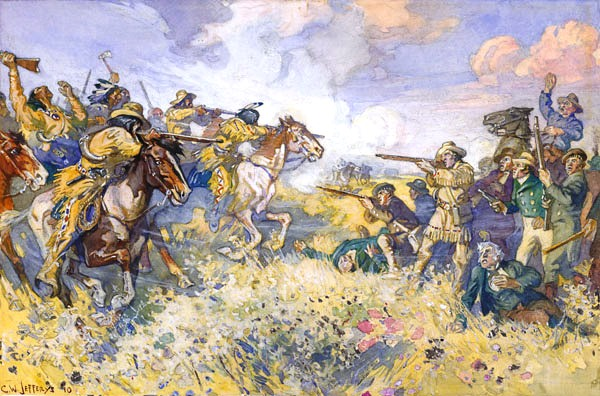
HBC officials and Métis voyageurs with the North West Company clash at Seven Oaks

In June 1815, Métis leader and NWC clerk Cuthbert Grant led a group to harass and steal supplies from the Red River settlement. In response, the HBC seized Fort Gibraltar in March 1816 to curb the pemmican trade. This led to the Battle of Seven Oaks in June 1816, where HBC officials confronted Métis and First Nations voyageurs. After the confrontation, Grant briefly controlled the area as Red River settlers withdrew to Norway House. HBC authority was restored in August when Thomas Douglas, 5th Earl of Selkirk, arrived with 90 soldiers.

=== British forces in Canada in the mid–19th century ===
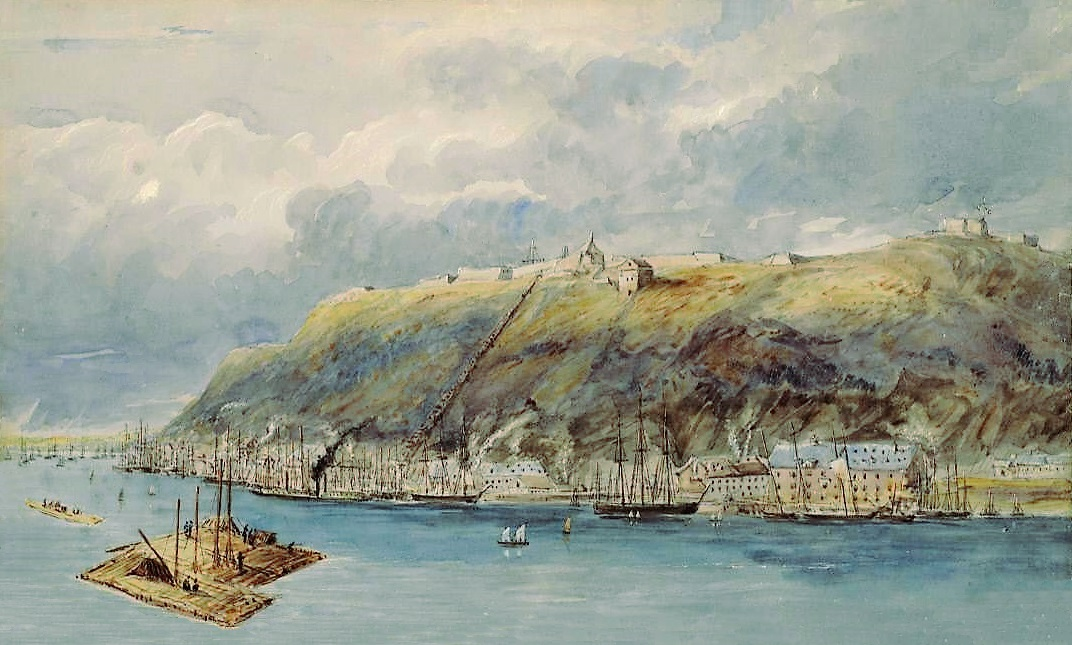
A steam engine moving stones up the promontory of Quebec for the construction of the Citadelle of Quebec, 1827

Fear of an American invasion of the Canadas persisted for at least the next half-century, prompting the retention of a sizable British garrison in the colonies. From the 1820s to the 1840s, the British built up several fortifications to serve as defensive points against potential invasions, including the citadel and ramparts in Quebec City, Fort Henry in Kingston, and Halifax's fortifications, the latter making up one of the British Imperial fortresses. The Rideau Canal was built to provide a northern waterway from Montreal to Kingston during wartime, bypassing the St. Lawrence River, a waterway that was also the Canada–United States border.

By the 1850s, fears of an American invasion had waned, prompting the British to downsize their garrison. The Canadian-American Reciprocity Treaty of 1854 further alleviated concerns.

==== Local levies and recruitment ====
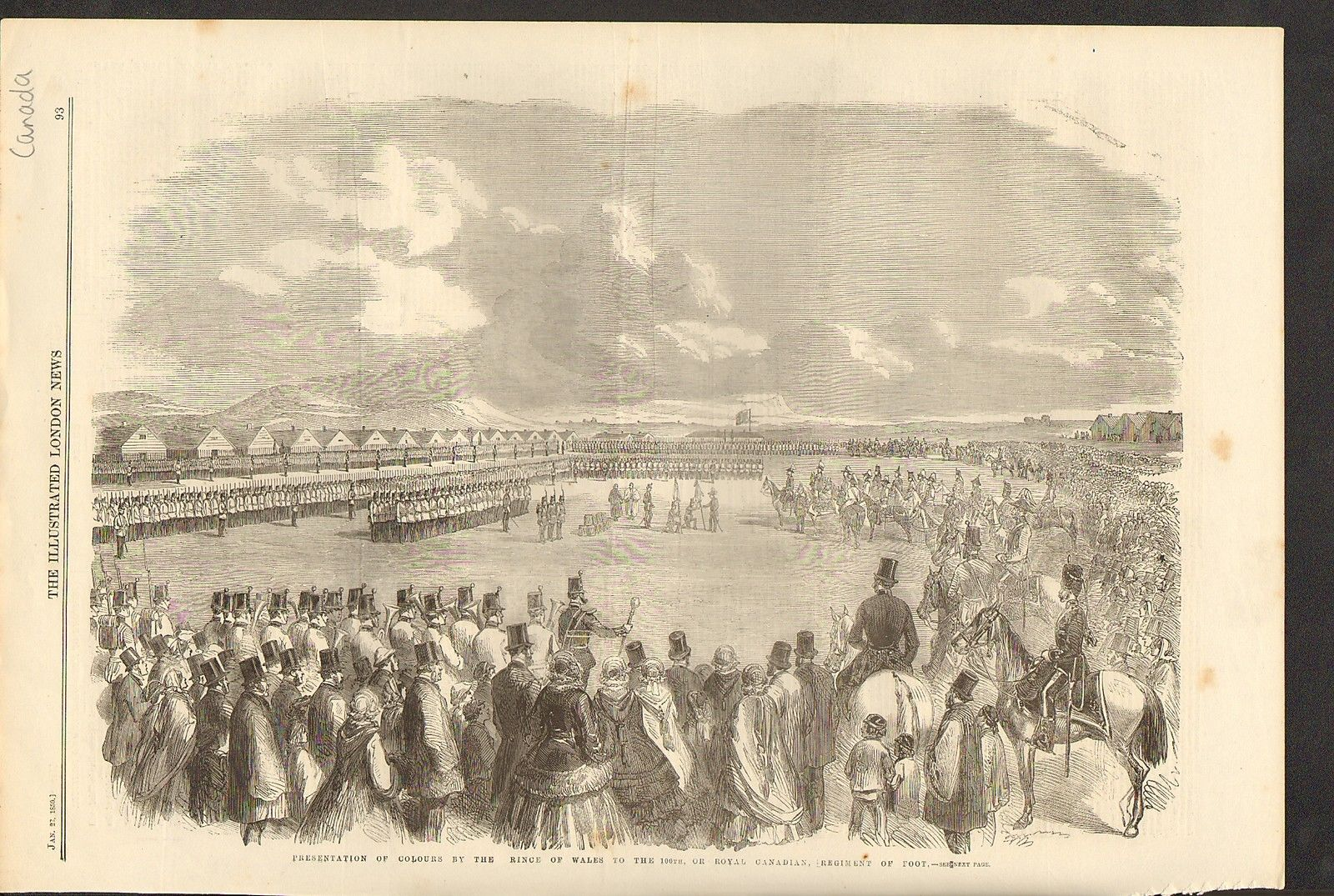
The 100th (Prince of Wales's Royal Canadian) Regiment of Foot receiving their regimental colours from Albert Edward, Prince of Wales, 1859

The British Army levied and recruited from the local population to form new units or to replace individuals lost to enemy action, sickness, or desertion, with levies taking place during the War of 1812 and the Rebellions of 1837–1838. British Army units raised in Canadian colonies during this period include the 100th (Prince of Wales's Royal Canadian) Regiment of Foot and the Royal Canadian Rifle Regiment.

Several Canadians served in British Army units during the Crimean War. The Welsford-Parker Monument in Halifax commemorates two Haligonian soldiers killed at the Battle of the Great Redan and is the only North American monument dedicated to the conflict. Alexander Roberts Dunn, the first Canadian to receive the Victoria Cross, earned it for his actions during the Charge of the Light Brigade. During the Indian Rebellion of 1857, William Hall became the first Black Nova Scotian and the first Black person in the British Empire to receive the Victoria Cross for his actions during the Siege of Lucknow.

=== Rebellions of 1837–1838 ===
Armed uprisings broke out from 1837 to 1838 in the Canadas. Calls for responsible government and an economic depression in Lower Canada led to protests and, subsequently, an armed insurrection led by the radical Patriote movement. Revolts in Lower Canada erupted in November 1837, and was the more significant and violent insurgency in the Canadas. Another armed uprising occurred in Upper Canada shortly thereafter, its leaders inspired by the events in Lower Canada.

The rebellions led to the Durham Report, which recommended uniting the Canadas and introducing responsible government. The former was realized when the Province of Canada was formed through the Act of Union 1840, while the latter was introduced in 1848.

==== Lower Canada ====
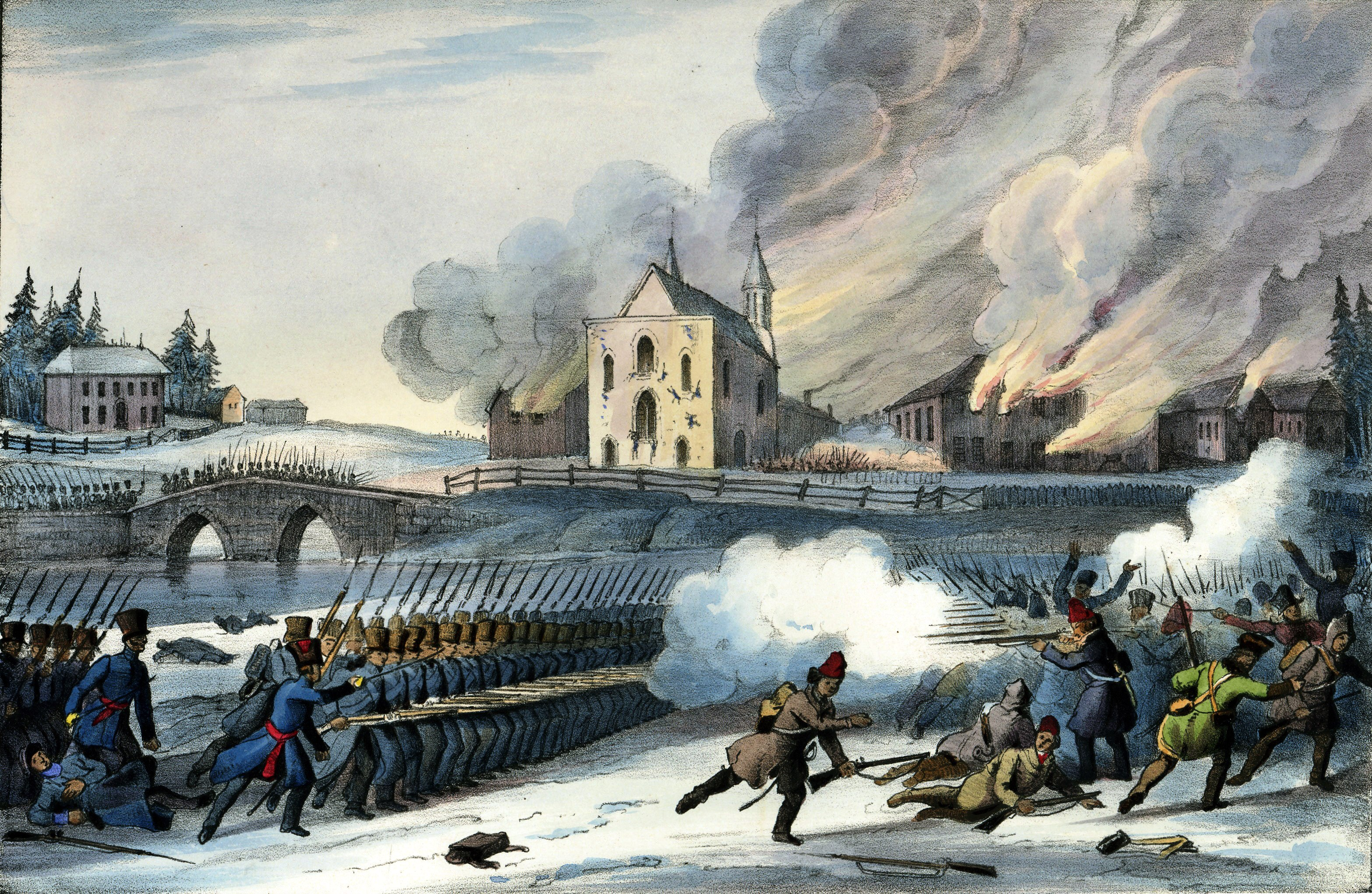
The Battle of Saint-Eustache in 1837, a decisive engagement during the first uprising of the Lower Canada Rebellion.

The first uprising in Lower Canada began in November 1837. British regulars and Canadian militia fought Patriote rebels in a series of skirmishes, including the battles of Saint-Denis, Saint-Charles, and Saint-Eustache. The disorganized rebels were defeated, with their leadership escaping to the US. Following this, anglophone militias pillaged and burned French Canadian settlements.

A second uprising in Lower Canada commenced in November 1838 with aid from American volunteers, but it was poorly organized and quickly put down. The two rebellions resulted in 325 deaths, predominantly among the rebels, while the British recorded 27 fatalities.

==== Upper Canada ====
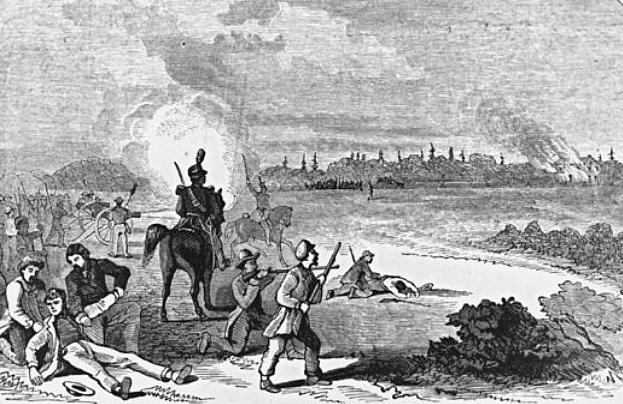
Confrontation at Montgomery's Tavern in December 1837

Events in Lower Canada emboldened William Lyon Mackenzie to rally radical followers to draft a republican constitution and revolt to seize control of the government. Rebels, largely made up of disaffected American-born farmers who opposed the preferential treatment of British settlers in the colony's land grant system, converged at Montgomery's Tavern in Toronto on December 5, 1837. Most rebels dispersed after encountering a picket of 20 Loyalists, though some rebels remained until additional Loyalist and Black Loyalist militias arrived three days later. Days later, Mackenzie's followers occupied Navy Island and declared the Republic of Canada. They remained on the island until January 1838, when they were forced to flee to the US after the Canadian militia destroyed their supply ship, the Caroline in US waters.

From 1838, rebels who had fled to the US conducted cross-border raids against Upper Canada, with support from the Hunters' Lodges, US-based secret societies aiming to overthrow British rule in Canada. While unsuccessful, these raids led the US to deploy military forces along its northern border to uphold American neutrality. The raids ended after the rebels' defeat at the Battle of the Windmill. British records report 13 British and Canadian soldiers killed, while Patriot casualties range from 17 to 50.

=== Conflicts during the Fraser Canyon Gold Rush ===
The influx of prospectors into the Fraser Canyon during the Fraser Gold Rush led to conflicts between miners and local First Nations. In 1858, the Fraser Canyon War began when the Nlaka'pamux attacked newly arrived prospectors in defence of their territory. The prospectors, largely newly arrived Americans, responded by forming armed companies and carrying out reprisals. Responding to the violence, the British established the colony of British Columbia on August 2 and dispatched gunboats to the Fraser River to enforce order. However, as its military capacity in that region was limited, the conflict continued until a truce was reached on August 21. The arrival of British forces later that month stabilized the region. Approximately 36 Nlakaʼpamux, including five chiefs, were killed.

The Chilcotin War erupted in April 1864 after the Tsilhqot'in killed 21 prospectors and construction workers who entered their territory. The killings led to a month-long armed standoff in the British Columbia Interior, as a force largely made up of American prospectors marched from New Westminster against the Tsilhqot'in. The conflict ended with the arrest of a Tsilhqot'in peace delegation under false pretenses. Six delegates were convicted and hanged for murder, despite Tsilhqot'in claims that the killings were acts of war. In 2018, the Canadian government exonerated the six men and issued an apology, acknowledging that they acted in accordance with Tsilhqot'in law and tradition.

=== American Civil War ===
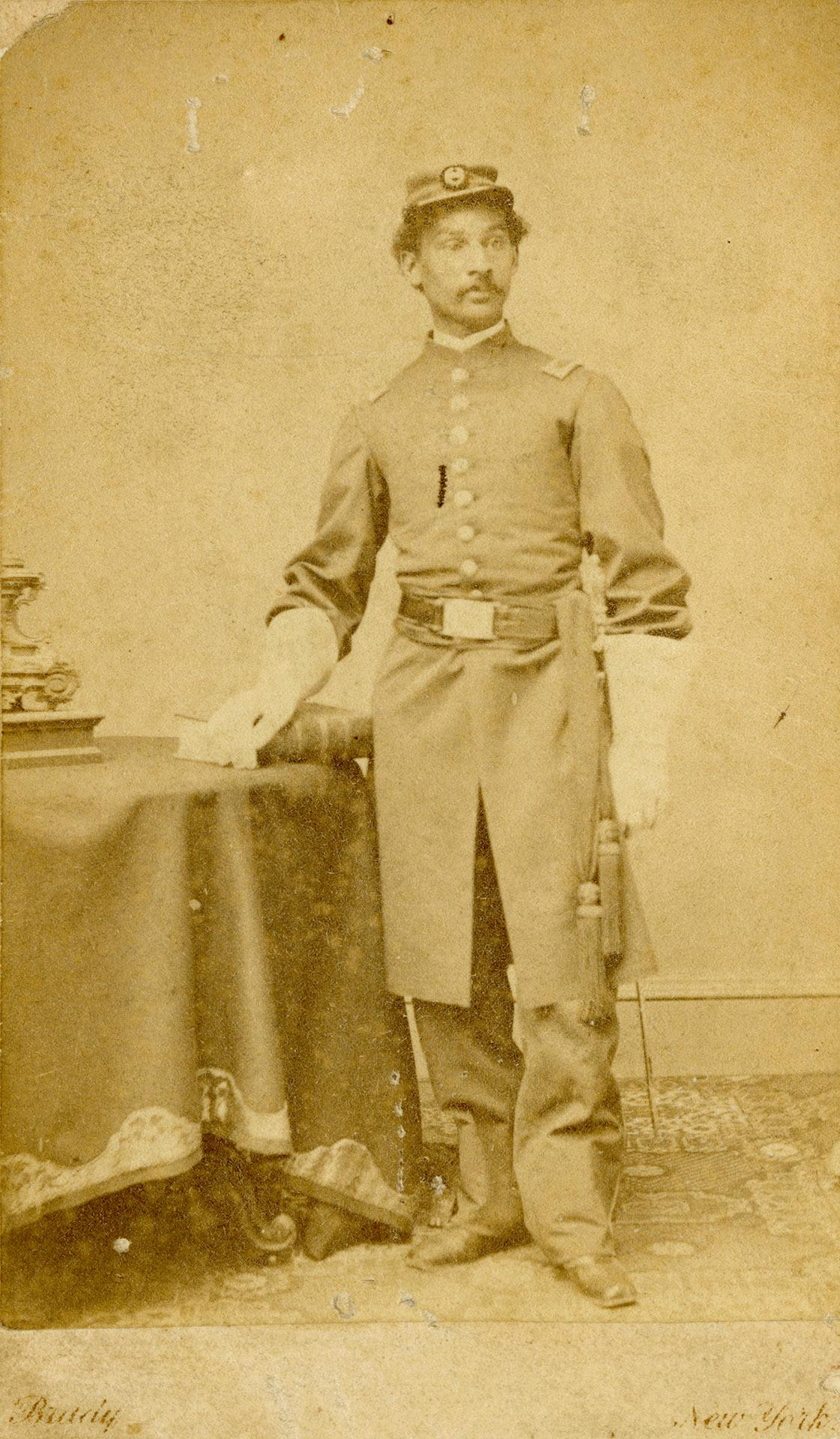
Anderson Ruffin Abbott in 1863, a Canadian who served in the Union Army during the American Civil War.

At the start of the American Civil War (1861–1865), the British Empire declared neutrality, although its colonies in British North America sold weapons to both sides of the war. Although some Canadian newspapers sympathized with the Confederate States of America due to its alignment with colonial "security interests," the vast majority of the 40,000 Canadians who volunteered to fight in the Civil War did so with the Union Army. Most Canadians fought as volunteers, although some were coerced into service by American recruiters or "crimpers". By the war's end, 29 Canadian Union Army officers were awarded the Medal of Honor.

Incidents like the Trent and the Chesapeake affairs strained Anglo-American relations. The Trent Affair, the most serious incident of the war, occurred in 1861 when a US gunboat stopped the RMS Trent to seize two Confederate officials en route to the UK. The British demanded an apology and the release of the passengers. War appeared imminent in the months after, with the British reinforcing its North American garrison from 4,000 to 18,000 soldiers. However, the crisis abated after an apology was issued. The presence of both Union draft dodgers and Confederate operatives in Canada further inflamed tensions between the United States and the British Empire.

When the Union Army regained the initiative in 1863, Confederate agent, Jacob Thompson, was tasked with creating a northern front from Canada. With Confederate activities tolerated by Canadian authorities and citizens, Thompson set up bases in Montreal and Toronto. His plans included raiding prison camps to free Confederate prisoners and attacking Union ships in the Great Lakes. In 1864, Confederate raiders from Montreal raided St. Albans in Vermont, but they were defeated and were subsequently arrested at the border by British soldiers.

=== Fenian raids ===
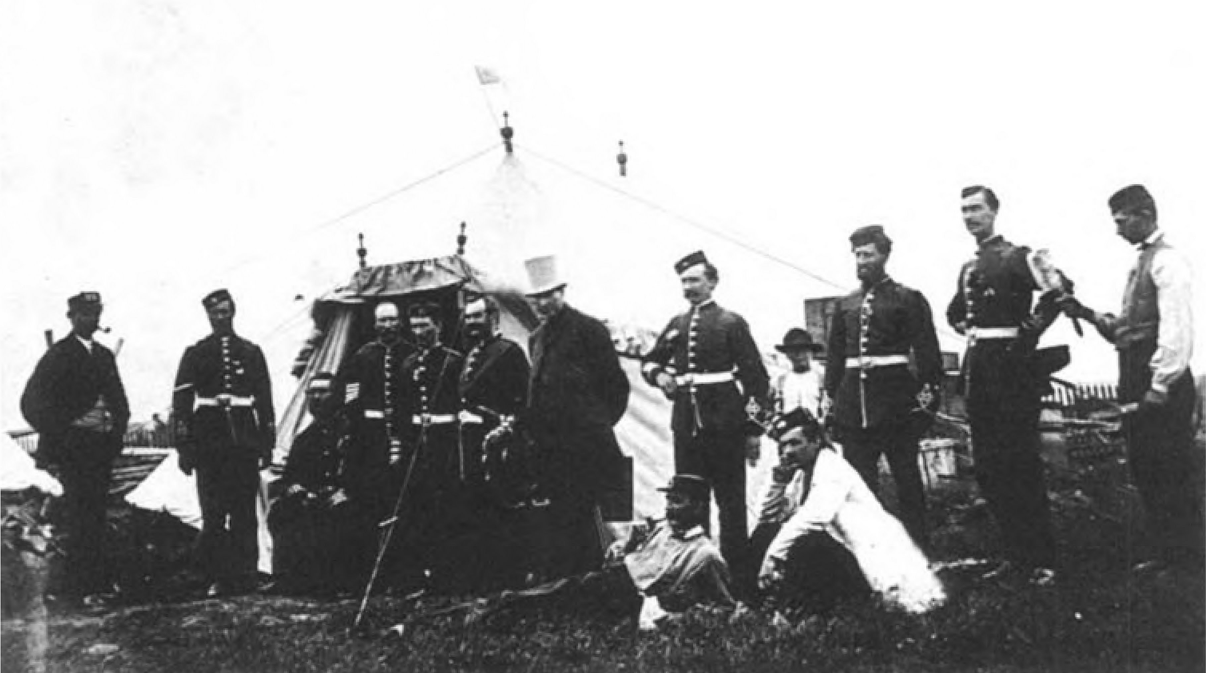
Volunteers of the Canadian militia who were mobilized during the Fenian raids in June 1866.

In the mid-1860s, Irish American veterans of the Union Army who were members of the Fenian Brotherhood, supported raiding British North America to force Irish independence. The Fenians incorrectly assumed that Irish Canadians would support their invasion. However, the majority of Irish settlers in Canada West were Protestant, mainly of Anglo-Irish or Ulster-Scot descent, and largely loyal to the Crown. Nonetheless, the threat prompted British and Canadian agents in the US to redirect their focus from Confederate sympathizers to the Fenians in 1865. Upon learning of the Fenians' planned attack, 10,000 volunteers of the Canadian militia were mobilized in 1866, a number that later increased to 14,000, and then to 20,000.

The first raid took place in April 1866, as Fenians landed on Campobello Island and razed several buildings. The largest raid occurred on June 2 at the Battle of Ridgeway, where 750–800 Fenians repelled nearly 900 Canadian militiamen, largely due to the latter's inexperience. However, the Fenians withdrew to the US shortly after, anticipating additional British and Canadian reinforcements. In the same month, another party of 200 Fenians was defeated near Pigeon Hill.

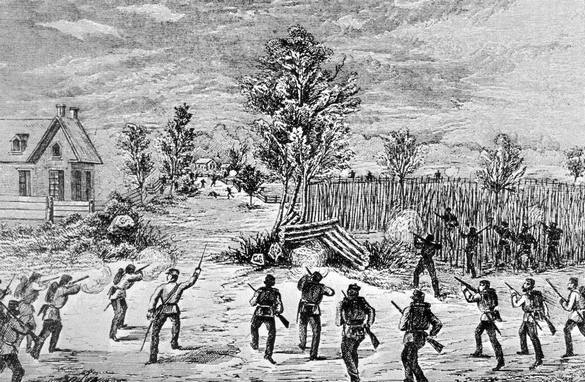
Members of the 50th Canadian Battalion engage the Fenians at the Battle of Eccles Hill in 1870

The threat of raids in 1870 led the government to mobilize 13,000 volunteers. Fenian raiding parties were defeated at the battles of Eccles Hill and Trout River in May 1870. In October 1871, 40 Fenians occupied a customs house near the Manitoba-Minnesota border, hoping to elicit support from Louis Riel and the Métis, but Riel raised volunteers to repel them. The US Army later intervened and arrested the Fenians, with the US not wanting to risk war with the UK.

While the militia prevented the Fenian from accomplishing its goals, the raids exposed deficiencies in its leadership, structure, and training, prompting subsequent reforms within it.

=== British forces in Canada in the late–19th century ===
By the mid-1860s, British North American colonies faced mounting pressure to assume their own defences as the UK sought to alleviate themselves of the cost of defending them and to redeploy troops to more strategic areas. British pressure and the American Civil War prompted various colonies to consider forming a single federation. Although some questioned the need to unite post-American Civil War, subsequent raids by Fenians made more people in British North America favourable to Canadian Confederation, which was eventually realized in 1867.

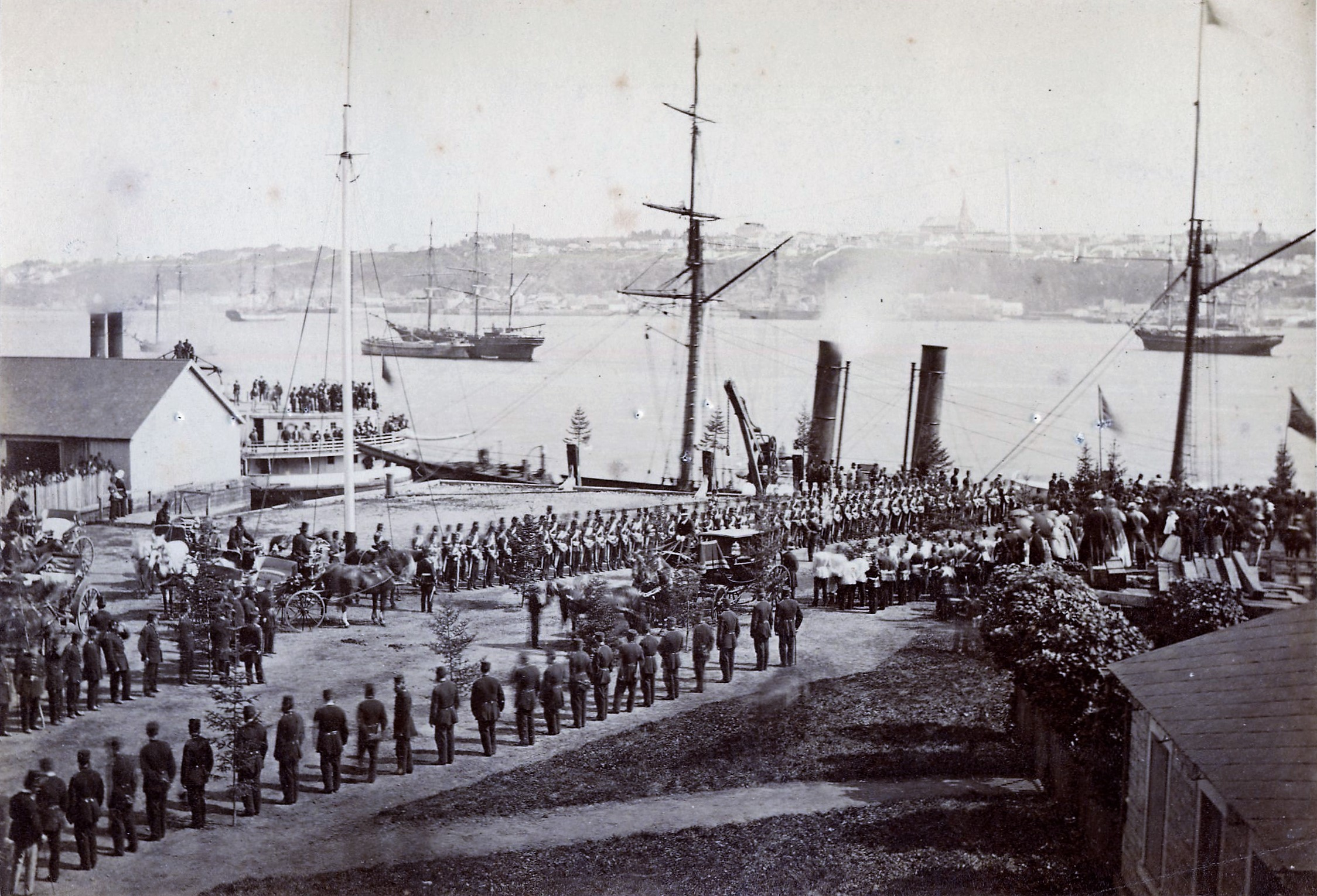
Departure of British forces from Quebec City in 1871. British forces withdrew from most of Canada in 1871, several years after Confederation.

In 1869, the US sent demands to the UK seeking damages for British transgressions during the American Civil War. A British delegation, including Canadian Prime Minister John A. Macdonald, negotiated the Treaty of Washington in 1871 to settle the issue. After these grievances were settled and most British North American colonies had joined Canadian Confederation, the British withdrew from Canada in 1871, except for Esquimalt and Halifax, where garrisons of the Pacific and North America and West Indies stations remained for reasons of imperial strategy. The Royal Navy continued to provide for Canada's maritime defence, with the understanding that they would provide additional aid in emergencies.

==== Canadian enlistment in British forces after 1871 ====
Canadian enlistment in the British military continued after Confederation and the British Army's withdrawal in 1871. Several Canadians opted for British service over the Canadian militia, as the latter showed little interest in expeditionary combat. The British Army specifically targeted Canadians for recruitment to replenish certain units, like the 100th Regiment of Foot. Canadians continued joining the British Army's enlisted ranks into the First World War, with several thousand Canadians serving in British units during that conflict.

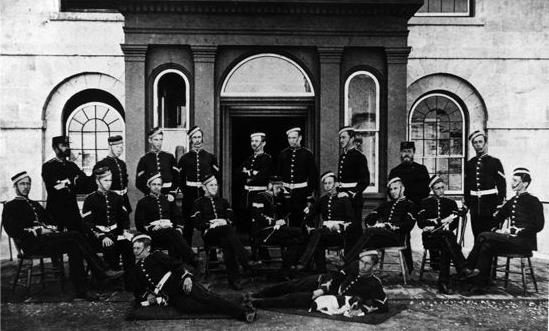
The first graduating class of the Royal Military College of Canada in 1878. Cadets were recruited into the British military and the Canadian militia in the 19th century.

The British War Office also reserved officer commissions for Canadian "gentlemen and journeymen" to fill vacancies and bolster the British officer corps. The recruitment of Canadians into the British officer corps was encouraged by the War Office as a way to promote military interoperability between Canada and the UK, and to make the Canadian government more amicable to the idea of its military participating in British overseas campaigns. By 1892, about two-thirds of Royal Military College of Canada (RMC) graduates who received commissions opted to join the British military rather than the Canadian militia.

By 1900, RMC graduates in the British military had participated in 27 campaigns across Africa, Burma, India, and China. From 1880 and 1918, around a quarter of RMC graduates accepted commissions in the British military. Recruitment of RMC officer cadets into the British military declined in the early 20th century due to efforts by Frederick William Borden, the Canadian minister of militia and defence. As a result, from 1911 to 1914, more than half of all graduates pursuing military careers joined the Canadian militia rather than the British military.

=== Canadian militia in the late–19th century ===
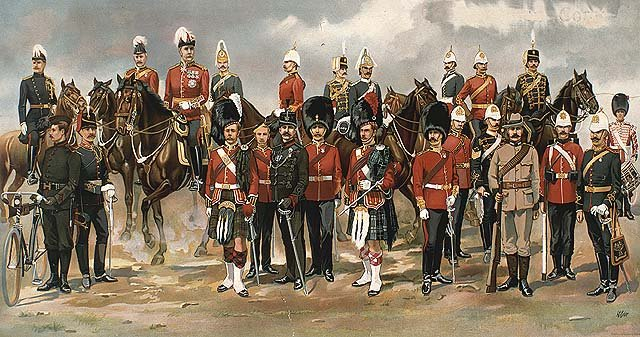
Uniforms used by the Canadian Militia in the late 19th century.

By the mid-19th century, the militia system in the Province of Canada was organized into two classes, sedentary and Active. The sedentary militia, later called the "Reserve Militia," was the traditional compulsory militia mobilized solely during emergencies. The Active Militia consisted initially of volunteer service battalions tasked with transport and operational duties.

The Active Militia began as an unpaid voluntary service but evolved into a paid part-time service under the Militia Act of 1855, comprising the Volunteer Militia, the Regular Militia, and the Marine Militia. The Volunteer Militia included artillery, cavalry, and infantry units. The Regular Militia comprised former serving men eligible for emergency service through balloting. The Marine Militia consisted of individuals employed to navigate Canada's waterways. In 1862, proposed legislation to enhance the sedentary militia ignited a debate over whether the colony should rely on a compulsory or voluntary service. Following the 1863 general election, a new Militia Act was passed, shifting the burden of defence to the Active Militia while also preserving the sedentary militia. The militia system was adopted into the Canadian federation through the 1868 Militia Act. After the British Army's departure in 1871, the Canadian militia shouldered the main responsibility for its defence.

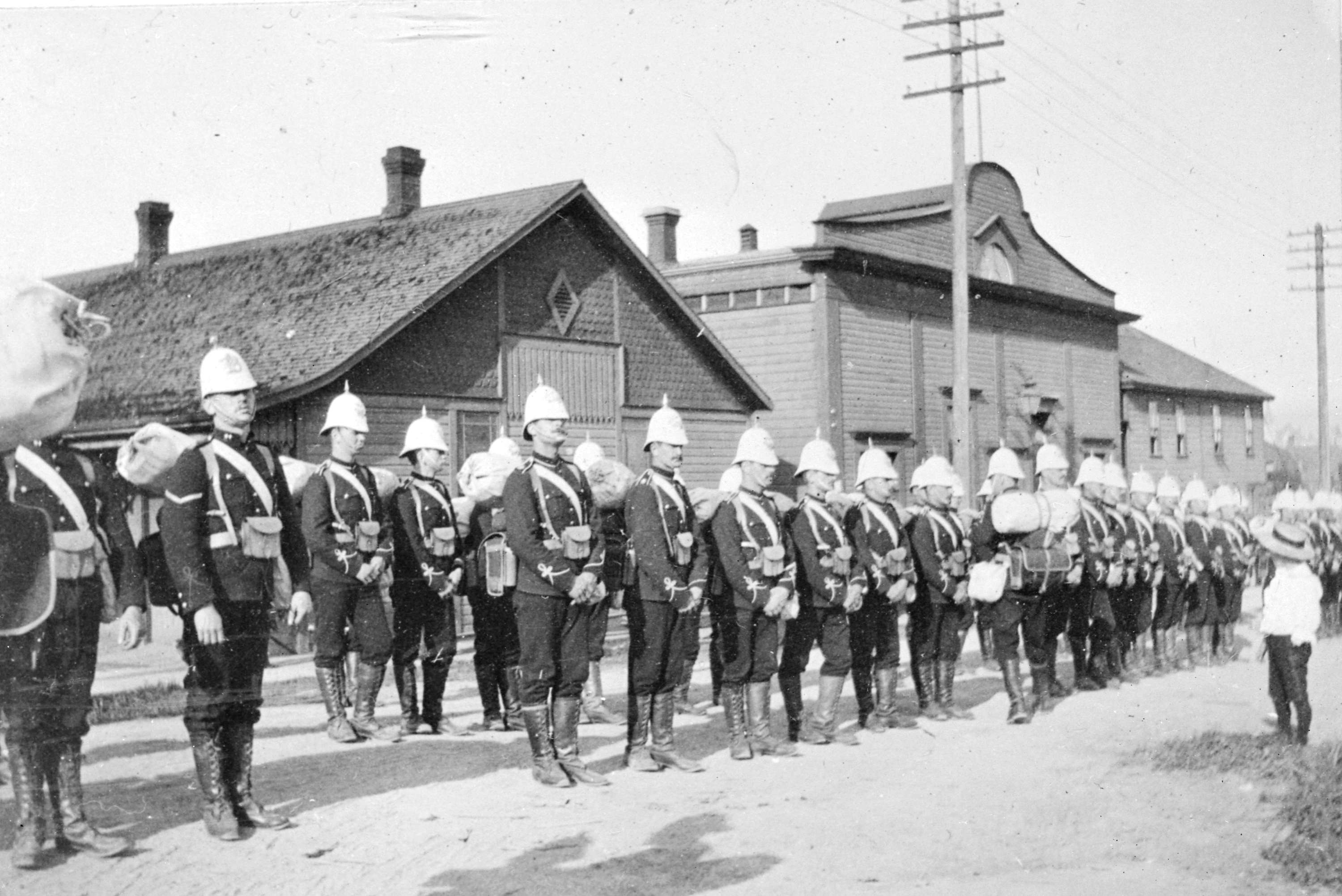
Members of the Yukon Field Force in Vancouver in 1898. The Yukon Field Force was a garrison of the Active Militia's Permanent Force.

The Active Militia underwent professionalization in the 1870s and 1880s, with the establishment of two professional artillery batteries in 1871. The Active Militia expanded under the 1883 Militia Act, authorizing a new cavalry troop, an additional artillery battery, and three infantry companies. These were intended to provide the professional backbone of the Permanent Force, a full-time "continuous service" component of the Active Militia. While the Active Militia's professional elements grew in the 1870s and 1880s, its marine component dwindled, with the last marine militia unit disbanded in 1878. The sedentary militia also fell into disuse during this period as annual musters became less frequent. By 1883, the sedentary militia was nearly non-existent, with the requirement for annual musters stricken from legislation.

=== Late–19th century conflicts in western Canada ===
==== Blackfoot-Cree conflict ====
As American hunters drove bison to near extinction, conflict erupted between the Blackfoot Confederacy and the Cree as both groups vied for control of the dwindling food source in the 1860s. The conflict culminated in the Battle of the Belly River in October 1870. A Cree war party engaged a Piikani Nation camp but was defeated, unaware that members of the Kainai Nation and Piegan Blackfeet were also there. The Blackfoot's use of revolving rifles likely aided in their victory. However their victory was pyrrhic, as their losses made them vulnerable to attack. Both sides lost as many as 300 warriors in the battle. Both sides, hoping to prevent another bloody battle like the one at Belly River agreed to peace in 1871.

==== Riel Rebellions ====
In the late 19th century, Louis Riel led two resistances against the Canadian government amid its efforts to settle western Canada and negotiate land transfer treaties with First Nations.

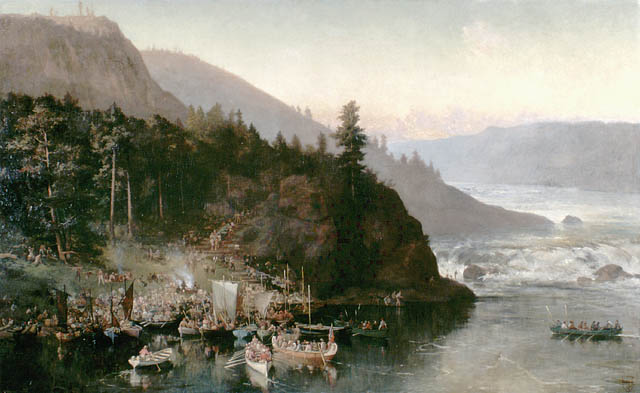
The Wolseley expedition near Kakabeka Falls. The British-Canadian military expedition was undertaken in 1870 to retake Upper Fort Garry.

The first resistance led by Riel, the Red River Rebellion (1869–1870), occurred before the transfer of Rupert's Land from the HBC to Canada. In December 1869, Riel and Métis settlers of the Red River Colony seized Upper Fort Garry to negotiate favourable terms for the colony's entry into Canadian confederation. After an English-speaking settler was executed, a military expedition made up of 400 British regulars and 800 Canadian militiamen set out to retake the fort. Riel and his followers fled to the US before the expedition's arrival in August 1870. Although they fled, the resistance achieved its major objectives, with the federal government recognizing the rights of the Red River settlers through the establishment of the province of Manitoba.

In 1884, Riel returned from the US and rallied local Métis in the North-West Territories to press their grievances against the Canadian government. In March 1885, a Métis armed force established the Provisional Government of Saskatchewan, with Riel as president. A three-month insurgency, called the North-West Rebellion, began later that month when Métis forces defeated a North-West Mounted Police (NWMP) contingent at Duck Lake. The battle emboldened the Plains Cree under Big Bear, leading to attacks on Battleford, Frog Lake, and Fort Pitt.

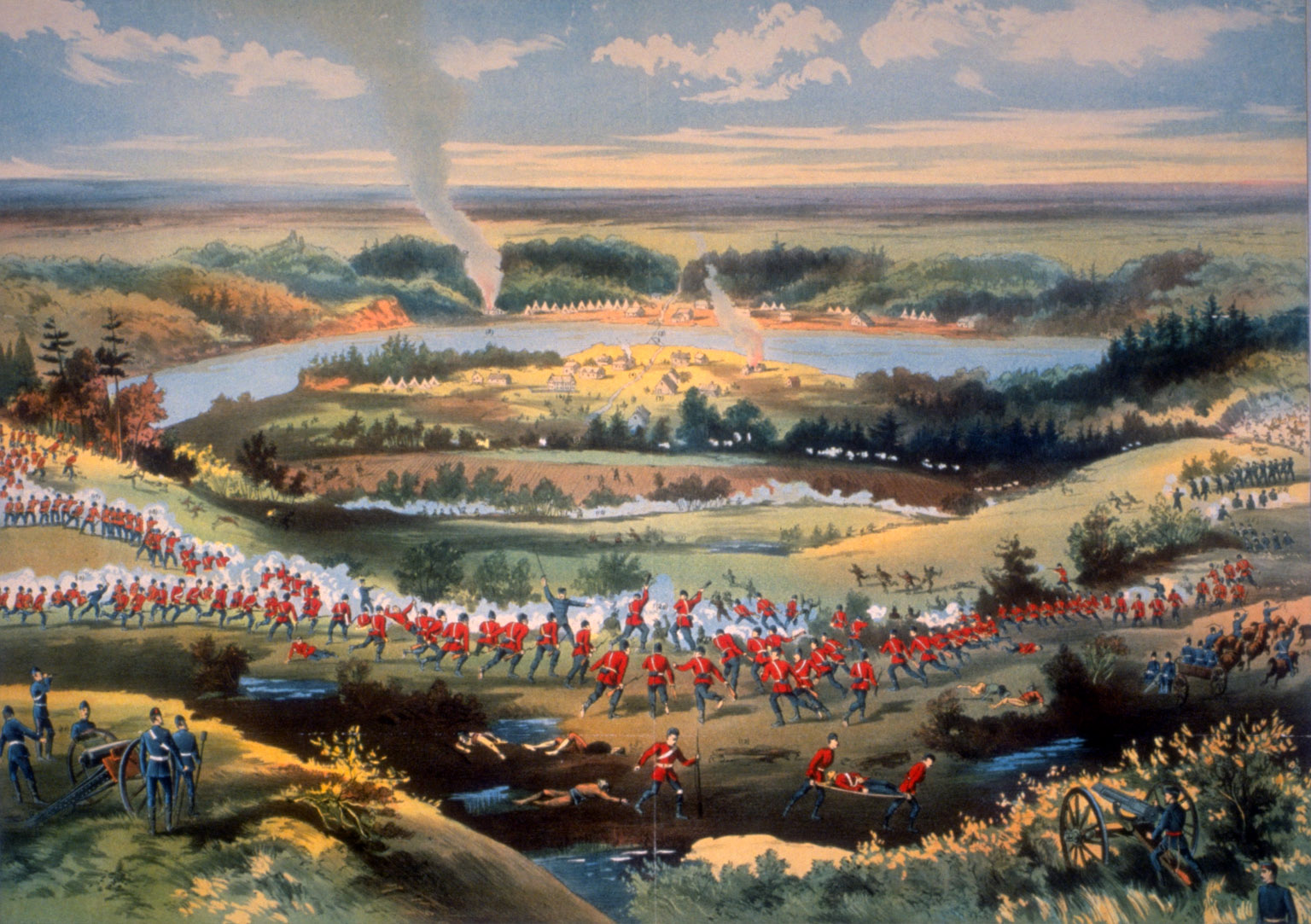
The Battle of Batoche in 1885 was a decisive engagement during the North-West Rebellion where Canadian soldiers defeated a force of indigenous and Métis people.

In response, the Canadian government mobilized 3,000 militiamen to quell the resistance. General Frederick Middleton initially planned for the 3,000-person force to travel together by rail, but attacks at Battleford and Frog Lake forced him to send a 900-person force ahead of the main contingent. However, after the forward force was repelled at the Battle of Fish Creek, Middleton chose to wait for the rest of the contingent before successfully besieging Riel's outnumbered forces at the Battle of Batoche. Although Riel was captured at Batoche in May, resistance from Big Bear's followers persisted until 3 June at the Battle of Loon Lake. Canadian militia and NWMP casualties during the conflict include 58 killed and 93 wounded.

=== Nile Expedition ===
In 1884, during the Mahdist War, British General Garnet Wolseley, drawing on his favourable experience with Canadian voyageurs during the Red River Rebellion, requested skilled Canadian boatmen to navigate his expedition up the Nile to relieve Major-General Charles Gordon's besieged forces in Khartoum. The Canadian government was hesitant to provide a force, but dispatched 386 voyageurs and Canadian militia officers after the British agreed to cover the cost of their deployment. Known as the Nile Voyageurs, the contingent became the first Canadian force to serve outside North America.

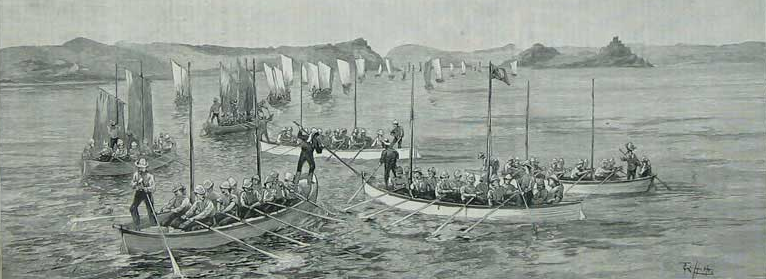
The Nile Expedition travelling by boat to relieve the siege of Khartoum

Arriving in Asyut in October 1884, the voyageurs transported 5,000 British troops upstream to Khartoum using wooden whaling boats. They arrived two days after the city's capture by Mahdist forces. Canadian militia officers overseeing the voyageurs took part in the Battle of Kirbekan weeks later. After Kirbekan, the expedition withdrew to Egypt, departing in April 1885. Sixteen members of the Canadian contingent died during the campaign.

== 20th century ==
=== Boer War ===
The issue of Canadian military participation in British imperial campaigns arose again when the British requested Canadian assistance in the Second Boer War (1899–1902). Most of English Canada supported participation, while near-universal opposition came from French Canadians and other groups. This split the governing Liberal Party led by Prime Minister Wilfrid Laurier, whose political base comprised both pro-imperial Anglo-Canadians and anti-imperial Franco-Canadians.

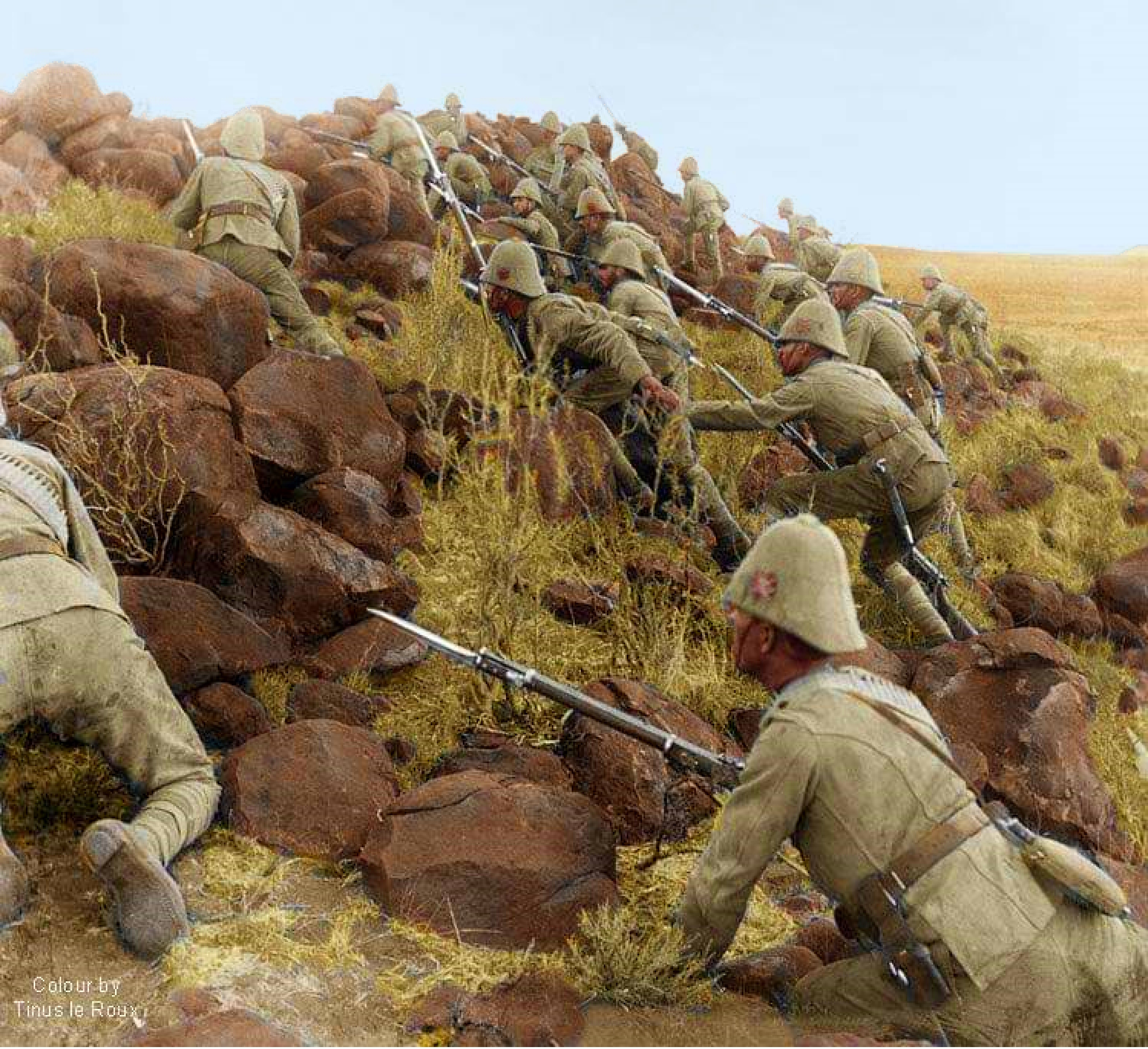
Royal Canadian Regiment of Infantry soldiers prepare to attack Boer position at the Battle of Paardeberg, 1900

Laurier aimed for a compromise to preserve Anglo-French relations, but faced pressure from his imperial-minded cabinet to send a token force of 1,000 soldiers from the Royal Canadian Regiment of Infantry. Two additional contingents followed, one comprising 6,000 volunteers from the Royal Canadian Dragoons and Canadian Mounted Rifles, and the third, Strathcona's Horse, was financed by The Lord Strathcona and Mount Royal. Many Canadians also served in the British Army's South African Constabulary.

Canadian forces arrived in South Africa after the initial phase of the conflict, which included British setbacks during Black Week. They earned praise for leading the final night attack that led to the Boers surrender at the Battle of Paardeberg. At the Battle of Leliefontein in November 1900, three members of the Royal Canadian Dragoons were awarded the Victoria Cross for protecting the rear of a retreating force, marking the only occasion when a Canadian unit received three Victoria Crosses in a single action. One of the last major battles involving Canadian units was the Battle of Hart's River in March 1902. During the conflict, Canadian forces played a role in maintaining British-run concentration camps.

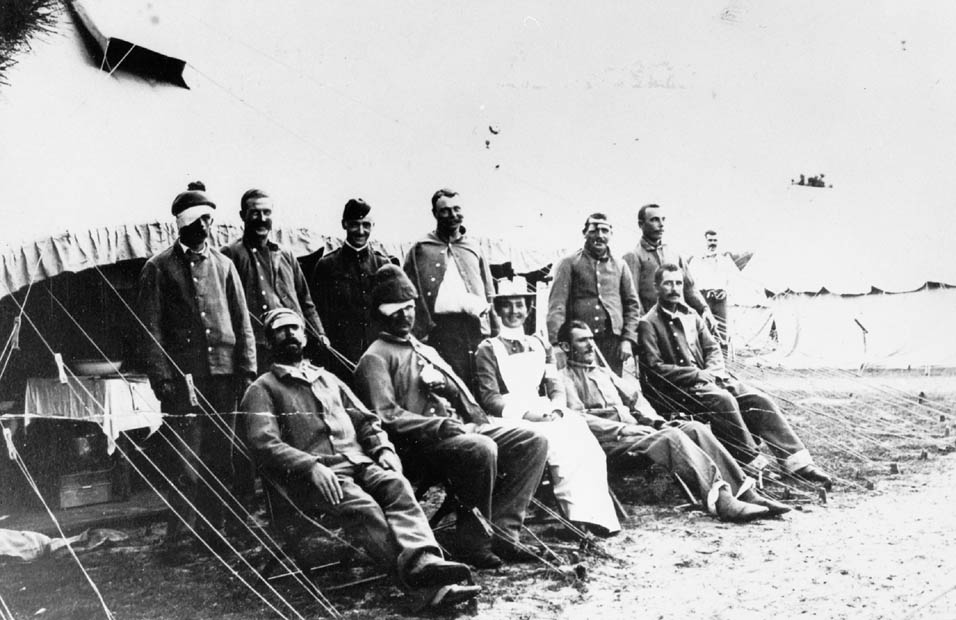
Injured Canadian soldiers and a nursing sister in South Africa, 1901

Around 8,600 Canadians volunteered for service during the Boer War. About 7,400 Canadians, including 12 nursing sisters, served in South Africa. Of these, 224 died, 252 were wounded, and five were awarded the Victoria Cross. A wave of celebrations swept the country after the war, marked by many towns erecting their first war memorials. However, the public debate over Canada's role in the conflict strained relations between English and French Canada.

=== Early 20th century military developments ===
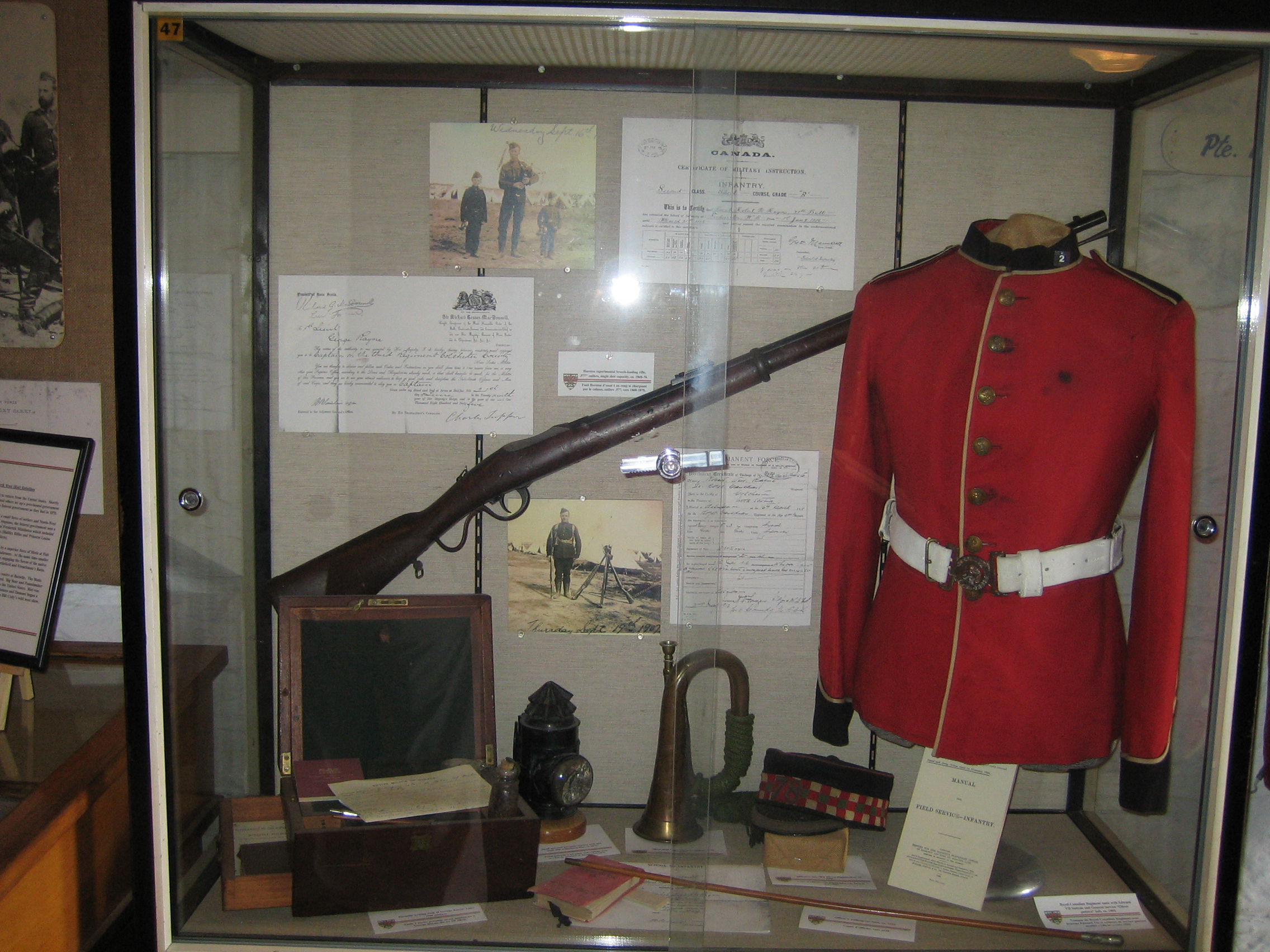
An exhibit of infantry equipment used by the Canadian Militia, c. 1900s

Discussions about reforming the Canadian Militia into a fully professional army arose during the Second Boer War. Lord Dundonald, the final British Army General Officer Commanding the Canadian Militia, implemented reforms that granted Canada its own technical and support branches. This included the Engineer Corps (1903), Signalling Corps (1903), Service Corps (1903), Ordnance Stores Corps (1903), Corps of Guides (1903), Medical Corps (1904), Staff Clerks (1905), and Army Pay Corps (1906). Additional corps would be created in the years before and during the First World War, including the first separate military dental corps.

At the turn of the century, Canada asserted greater control over its defences with the passage of a new Militia Act in 1904, appointing a Canadian Chief of the General Staff. Additionally, control of the Imperial fortress of Halifax and Esquimalt Royal Navy Dockyard was transferred to Canada by the British military in 1906. The Militia Act of 1904 also formally acknowledged the obsolescence of the sedentary Reserve Militia by removing the provision that designated male inhabitants of military age as members, replacing it with a provision theoretically making them "liable to serve in the militia".

==== Creation of a Canadian navy ====
Canada initially maintained a small fishing protection force under the Department of Marine and Fisheries but depended on the UK for maritime defence. However, as the British engaged in a naval arms race with Germany, it looked to its dominions to assist with Imperial naval strategy in 1908. The Conservative Party advocated for Canada to contribute funds solely for the purchase and maintenance of Royal Navy vessels. Some French Canadian nationalists opposed sending any aid, while others proposed establishing an independent Canadian navy capable of assisting the British when necessary.

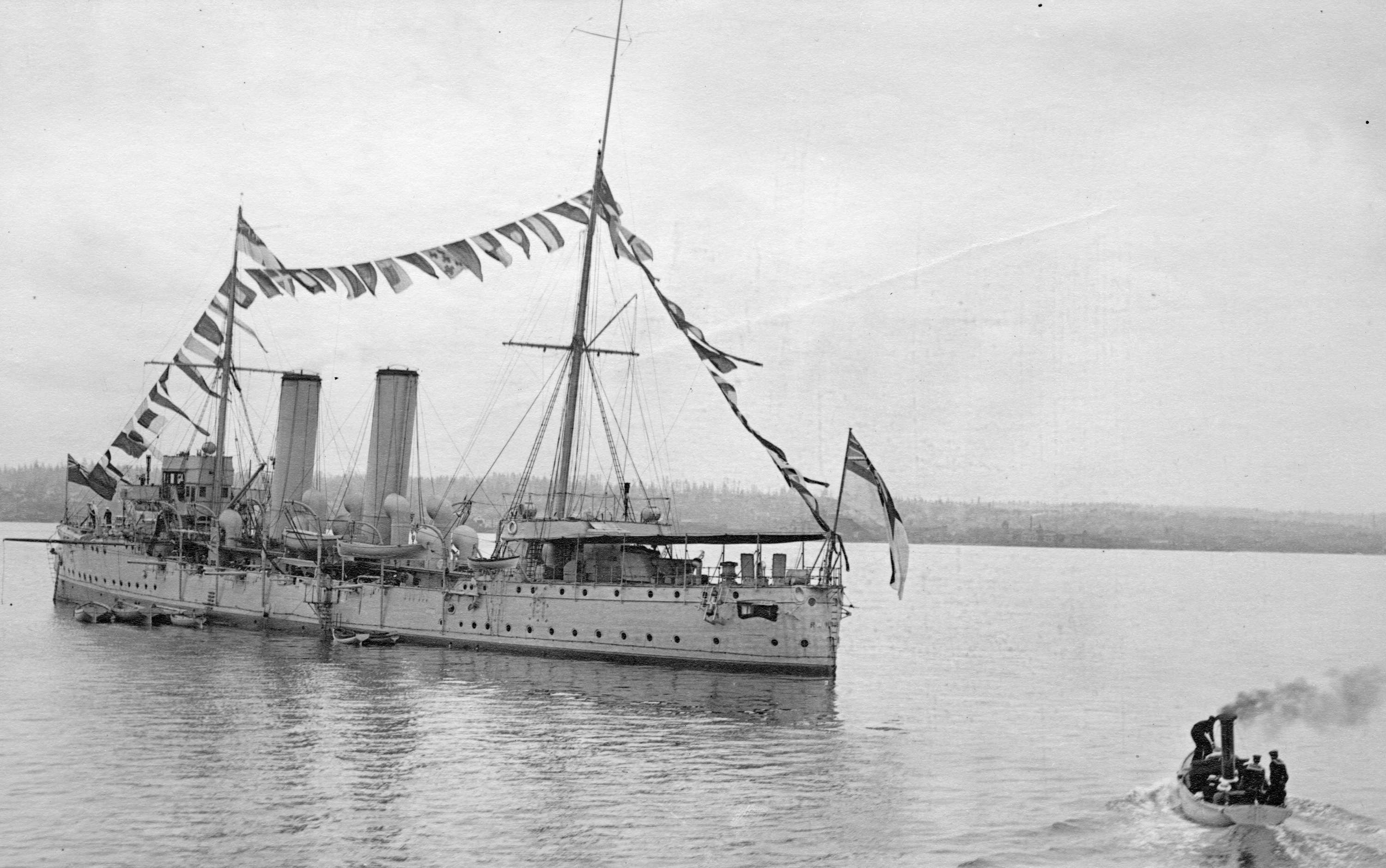
HMCS Rainbow in Vancouver, shortly after its recommissioning with the Canadian Naval Service in 1910.

Prime Minister Laurier adopted a compromised position, leading to the creation of the Canadian Naval Service in 1910, later designated as the Royal Canadian Navy (RCN) in August 1911. To appease imperialists, the Naval Service Act included a provision allowing the RCN to be transferred to the British in emergency cases. The bill aimed to build a fleet of five cruisers and six destroyers. The first two ships, Niobe and Rainbow, were somewhat outdated vessels purchased from the British. However, the election of a Conservative government in 1911 led to a reduction in funding, although later increased during the First World War.

=== First World War ===
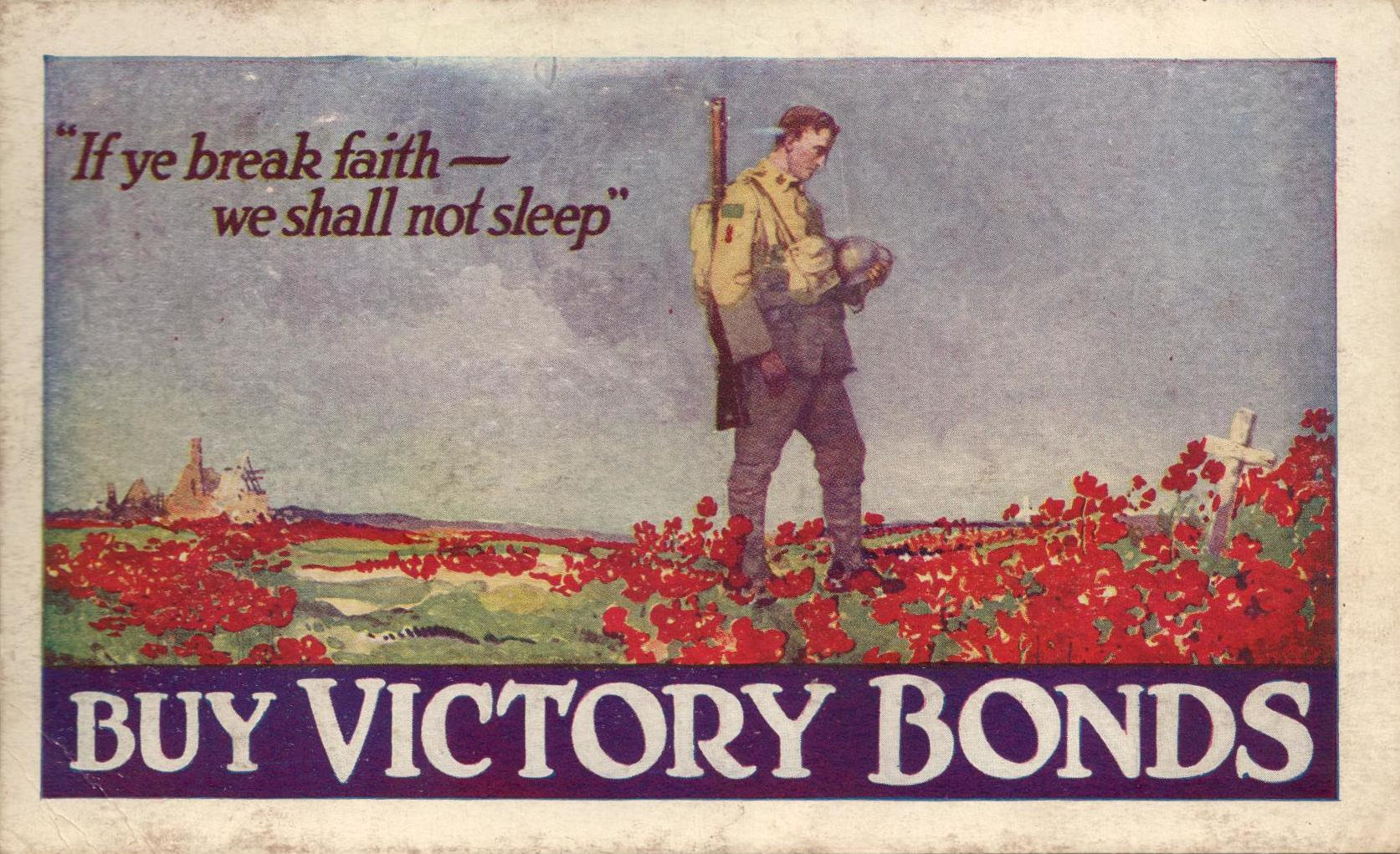
A Canadian postcard from 1918 encouraging the purchase of Victory Bonds. It depicts a soldier standing in a poppy field and includes a line from the war poem "In Flanders Fields".

On August 5, 1914, the British Empire, including Canada, entered the First World War (1914–1918) as a part of the Entente powers. As a dominion of the Empire, Canada had control over its contributions to the war effort. During the war, Canadian military spending rose considerably, with its financing being supported by the introduction of income taxes and Victory Loan campaigns. Canada also sold munitions to Britain after it experienced a shell shortage, prompting the establishment of the Imperial Munitions Board.

A total of 619,636 people served in the Canadian military during the war. Of those, 59,544 were killed and 154,361 were wounded. Many veterans of the war faced significant postwar challenges, including discrimination and limited employment opportunities. The conflict provided Canada with a greater degree of autonomy within the British Empire and a modest diplomatic presence at the Paris Peace Conference.

==== Canadian Expeditionary Force ====
The Canadian Militia was not mobilized. Instead, a separate Canadian Expeditionary Force (CEF) was raised for the conflict. The CEF comprised infantry battalions and the Canadian Cavalry Brigade, with recruitment handled by the militia. Canada also established the Canadian Forestry Corps to harvest wood from France and Scotland for the war effort.

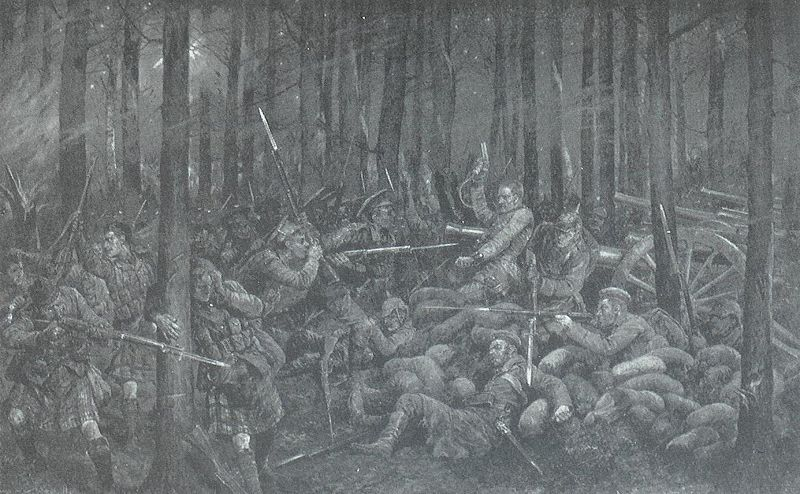
Canadian forces repelling a German attack during the Battle of Kitcheners' Wood, an engagement during the Second Battle of Ypres in April 1915.

The first Canadian contingent departed for Europe on October 3, 1914. The CEF's first large engagement was the Second Battle of Ypres from April–May 1915. At Ypres, Canadian soldiers withstood the first large-scale use of poison gas in history. In September 1915, after Ypres, the Canadian Corps was formed with the arrival of the 2nd Canadian Division in France, consolidating the CEF. The corps expanded with the 3rd Canadian Division joining in December 1915, followed by the 4th Canadian Division in August 1916. The 5th Canadian Division, formed in February 1917, never fully formed and was disbanded in February 1918.

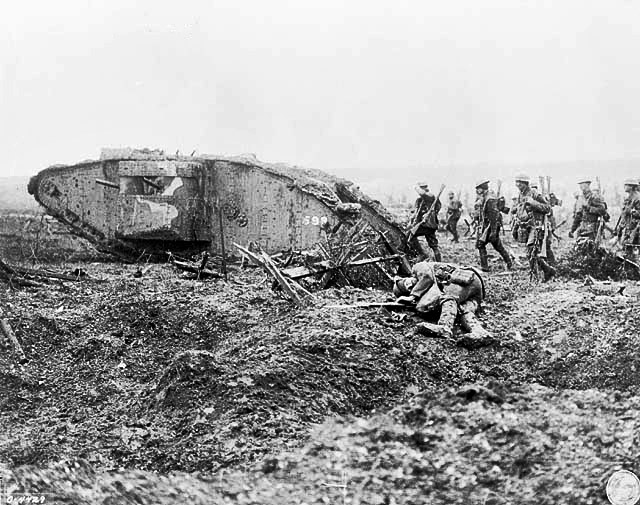
Canadian troops advance behind a Mark II tank during the Battle of Vimy Ridge, 1917

In early 1916, Canadian divisions participated in local actions like the Actions of St Eloi Craters and the Battle of Mont Sorrel. The British Somme Offensive began on July 1, where on its first day, the Newfoundland Regiment was annihilated, losing 91 per cent of its men in 40 minutes. Canadian divisions were deployed to the Somme in August 1916. After the Somme Offensive, Canadian leaders advocated for the corps to operate as a unified force rather than being dispersed among different British units. The Canadian Corps, comprising four divisions, was consolidated for the Battle of Vimy Ridge, a crucial phase of the Battle of Arras.

After Vimy Ridge, Canadian Lieutenant-General Arthur Currie assumed command of the corps. Under his leadership, the corps fought in the Battle of Hill 70 and the Battle of Passchendaele in 1917. In 1918, the corps was sent to Amiens to bolster the lines during the Hundred Days Offensive. Throughout the war's later stages, the corps earned a reputation as one of the most capable and esteemed formations on the Western Front. Throughout this period, the Canadian Corps participated in key battles such as Amiens and the Cambrai. The Canadian Corps' rapid advance from Amiens in August to Mons by the armistice on November 11th, is known as Canada's Hundred Days.

==== Air and sea operations ====
During the war, the RCN primarily conducted coastal submarine patrols as part of the Atlantic U-boat campaign. Canada suffered from several maritime disasters during the war. The sinking of HMHS Llandovery Castle by a U-boat in June 1918 marks the deadliest Canadian naval disaster of the war. The Halifax Explosion on 8 December 1917 was another major disaster, killing approximately 2,000 people with an additional 9,000 casaulties. A munition ship carrying explosives collided with another vessel, caught fire, and exploded, producing what was then the largest human-made explosion in history and destroying the entire north end of the city.

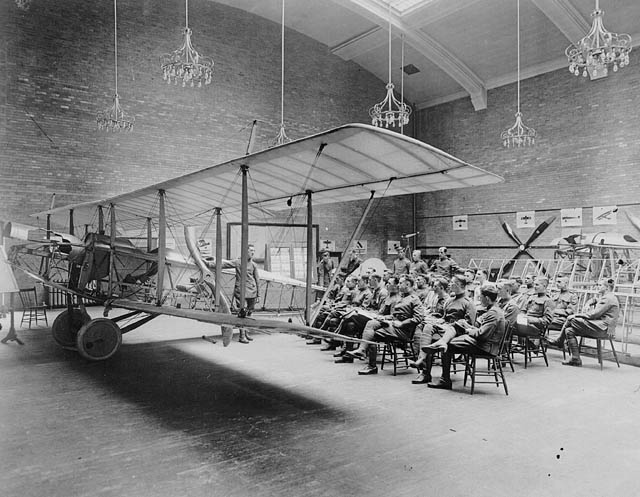
Lecture on rigging at the University of Toronto for the Royal Flying Corps Canada's aviation school.

Besides the Canadian military, Canadians served in British forces such as the Royal Navy and the Royal Flying Corps (RFC). More than 5,000 Canadians served in the RFC, with Canadians making up nearly a quarter of all Royal Flying Corps pilots, including the Empire's leading flying ace, Billy Bishop. Royal Flying Corps Canada was established in December 1916 as a training program for the force. By November 1918, it had graduated more than 3,100 pilots and observers, and 7,400 mechanics and aircraftsmen.

==== Conscription ====
Although enthusiasm to enlist was strong in 1914, by 1916, enthusiasm had waned. At the 1917 Imperial War Cabinet, Britain urged its dominions to alleviate manpower shortages caused by the collapse of the Russian Empire and the French Army mutinies. To maintain Canada's contributions, Prime Minister Robert Borden advocated for conscription in the 1917 federal election, sparking a national debate and crisis. The debate highlighted divisions between English and French Canada, with English Canada largely supporting it, while French Canadians, some English-speaking farmers, trade union leaders, pacifists, and Indigenous leaders opposing it.

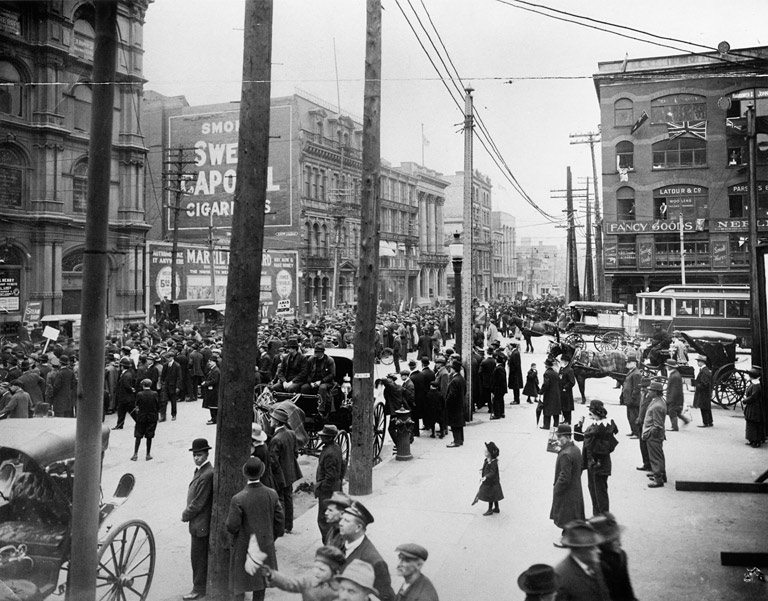
Protest against the Military Service Act, 1917 and conscription at Victoria Square, Montreal, May 1917

Borden's Unionist Party, a coalition of pro-conscription Conservatives and Liberals, won the election and passed the Military Service Act, 1917, although it included various exemption provisions. After conscription was implemented in 1918, over 400,000 were called up, but 380,510 appealed for exemption. Ultimately, only 24,132 conscripts were sent to Europe.

==== Commemoration ====
The war's impact led to the construction of war memorials in Canada. The Canadian National War Memorial was unveiled in 1939 and has since been used to honour Canadian war dead for other conflicts. There are also eight memorials in France and Belgium to honour Canada's war dead from the war, like the Canadian National Vimy Memorial.

Distinct memorials honour the contributions of Newfoundland soldiers, then a separate British dominion. The largest Newfoundland memorials include the Beaumont-Hamel Newfoundland Memorial in France and the Newfoundland National War Memorial in St. John's.

=== Interwar period ===
After the First World War, the Canadian Expeditionary Force was dissolved, with honours earned by its battalions perpetuated by Canadian militia units. In 1921, the Active Militia was restructured, forming the Permanent Active Militia from Permanent Force, and the Non-Permanent Active Militia from its reserve component. The National Defence Act of 1922 consolidated the Department of Militia and Defence with Air and Naval Services under the Department of National Defence.

The greater degree of autonomy Canada saw after the First World War, coupled with public reluctance to participate in further imperial conflicts, led the Canadian government to refuse a British request for military aid during the 1922 Chanak Crisis.

==== Intervention in Russia ====
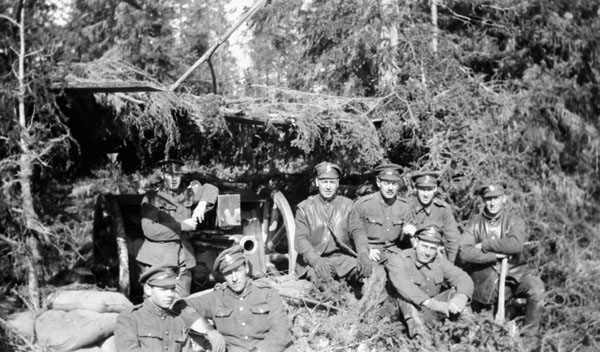
Canadians with the North Russian Expeditionary Force pose with a camouflaged gun, 1919

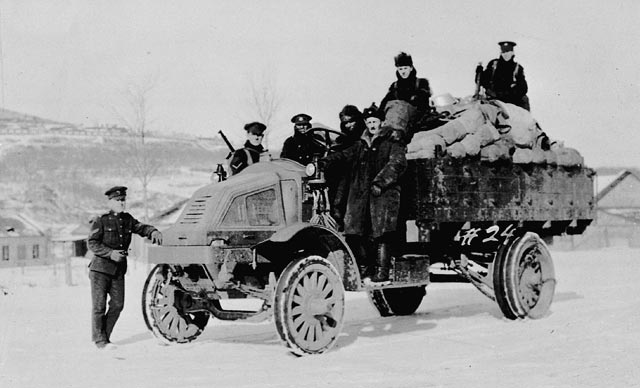
Troops of the Canadian Siberian Expeditionary Force with a truck, 1919

The Canadian government sent around 6,000 soldiers to aid the Allied intervention in the Russian Civil War in mid-1918 in response to a British request for assistance. Around 4,200 soldiers of the Canadian Siberian Expeditionary Force (CSEF) were deployed to Vladivostok, while another Canadian contingent joined the Allied North Russian Expeditionary Force in northwest Russia. Canadian soldiers were deployed to northwest Russia in May 1918, while CSEF was deployed to Vladivastok in October.

Shortly after the end of the First World War, the King's Privy Council for Canada debated the continued military presence in Russia. A decision was made to extend the commitment until spring 1919, although they limited the use of its forces, requiring their explicit consent for their use.

CSEF began its withdrawal from Russia in April 1919. The 16th Canadian Field Artillery Brigade withdrew from northwest Russia in June 1919. The majority of Canadian soldiers stationed in Russia experienced minimal combat before their withdrawal. Although some Canadians died in combat as pilots over the Black Sea, the majority died from disease or accidents. In total, 21 Canadians died in the Russia intervention.

==== Establishing an air force ====
The First World War spurred the formation of Canada's air force. Initially, Canada lacked an independent air force, although in 1914, the Canadian government authorized the formation of the Canadian Aviation Corps to accompany the Canadian Expeditionary Force to Europe with one aircraft, a Burgess-Dunne. However, the corps was disbanded in 1915. Canadians military aviators served with the British Royal Flying Corps and the Royal Naval Air Service during the war.

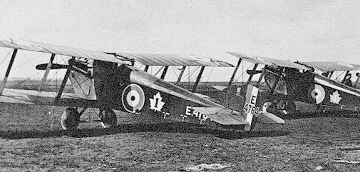
The Canadian Air Force of 1918 at RAF Upper Heyford, with Sopwith Dolphins as part of the No. 1 Fighter Squadron

In 1918, the British Air Ministry established a Canadian bomber and fighter squadron in Europe, marking a second attempt at forming a Canadian air force. The Canadian government later assumed control of these two squadrons, forming the Canadian Air Force. This air force, however, never saw service and was completely disbanded by 1921.

During the 1920s, the British government urged Canada to establish a peacetime air force, offering surplus aircraft. In 1920, the Canadian Air Force (CAF) was created under the Air Board, serving as a part-time or militia service for flying refresher training. After a reorganization the CAF became responsible for all flying operations in Canada, including civil aviation. The Royal Canadian Air Force (RCAF) took over civil flying responsibilities from the Air Board and CAF after its creation in April 1924. The Second World War saw the RCAF become a true military service.

==== Spanish Civil War ====
Canada did not participate in the Spanish Civil War (1936–1939), although more than 1,500 Canadians fought as volunteers for the Spanish Republican faction. Most volunteers were recent immigrants, Communist Party members, and former relief camp workers.

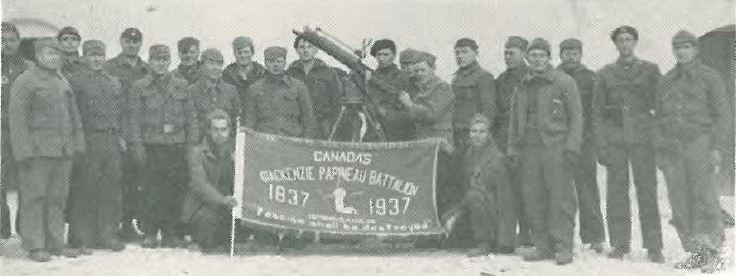
The Ikka Machine Gun Company of the Mackenzie-Papineau Battalion, c. 1937–38

Canadian volunteers initially joined the British Battalion, although 40 Canadians also joined the Lincoln and the George Washington battalions. In July 1937, the primarily Canadian Mackenzie–Papineau Battalion was mustered into the XV International Brigade. The battalion fought in five major campaigns, including the Battle of Teruel, the Aragon Offensive, and the Battle of the Ebro. Between 400 and 721 Canadian volunteers died in the war.

=== Second World War ===
The Second World War (1939–1945) began on September 1, 1939, with Nazi Germany's invasion of Poland. Canada issued a declaration of war against Germany on September 10. Although Canada was a significant contributor to the war, it played no major role in its strategic planning, as Prime Minister William Lyon Mackenzie King refrained from involvement.

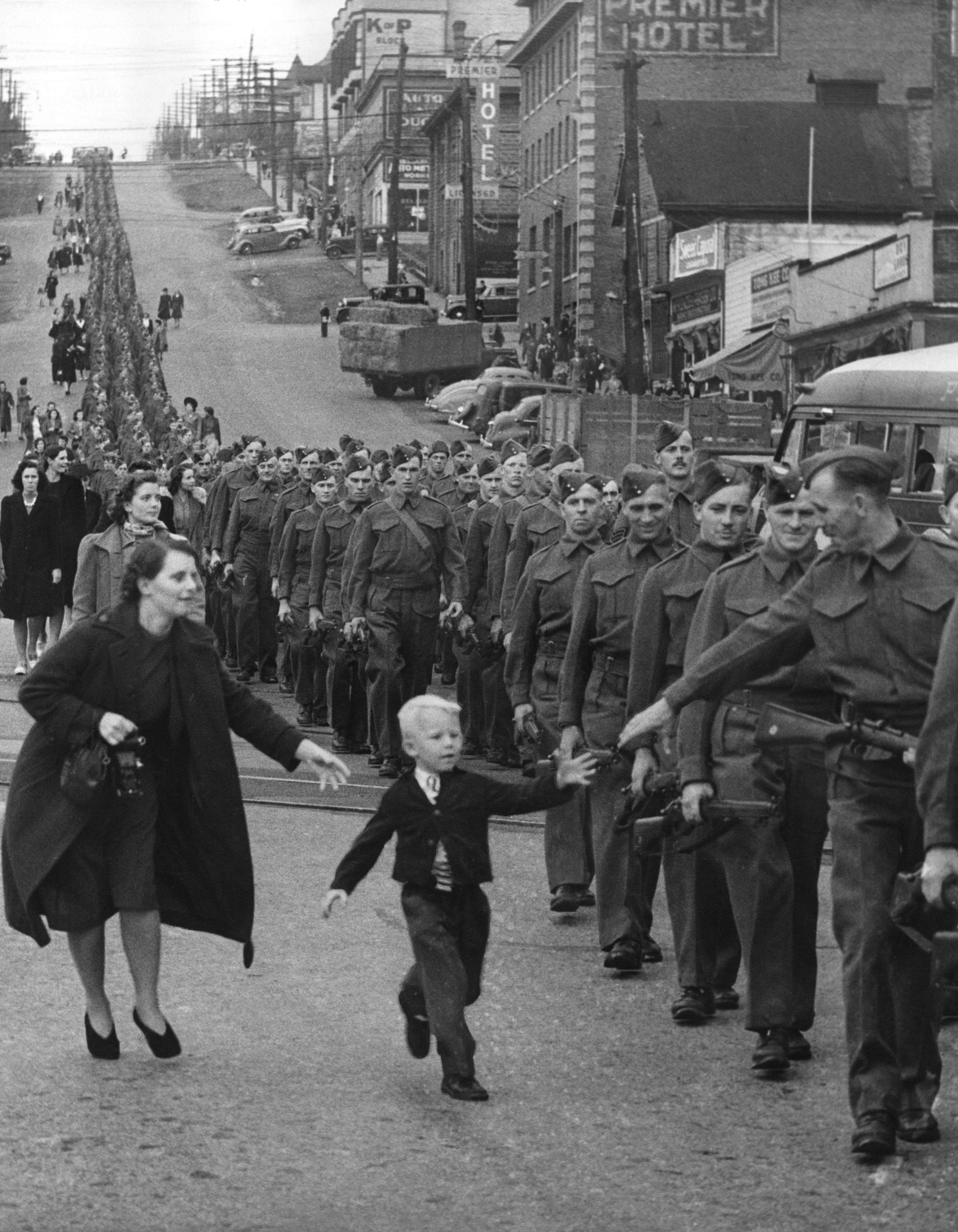
Wait for Me, Daddy, by Claude P. Dettloff, October 1940, show Canadian soldiers marching to board the SS Princess Joan.

The fall of Belgium and France to Germany in June 1940 led Canada to drastically expand its military spending and armed forces, and implement conscription for home defence. Like the First World War, conscription for overseas service was a divisive issue, with some English Canadians supporting it and French Canadians opposing it. The Conscription Crisis of 1944 saw Mackenzie King pressured to accept conscription for overseas service.

Hostilities ceased in September 1945. Around 1.1 million Canadians served in the military during the war, with over 45,000 casualties and 55,000 wounded.

==== Canadian Army operations ====
The Canadian Militia (renamed the Canadian Army in November 1940) saw minimal action early in the war, with the 1st Canadian Division only briefly deploying alongside the Second British Expeditionary Force during the fall of France in June 1940. After the British withdrawal from Dunkirk, the 1st Canadian Division was one of few fully intact formations left in the UK in terms of equipment and manpower. By late 1940, multiple Canadian units were stationed in the UK to defend against a potential German invasion.

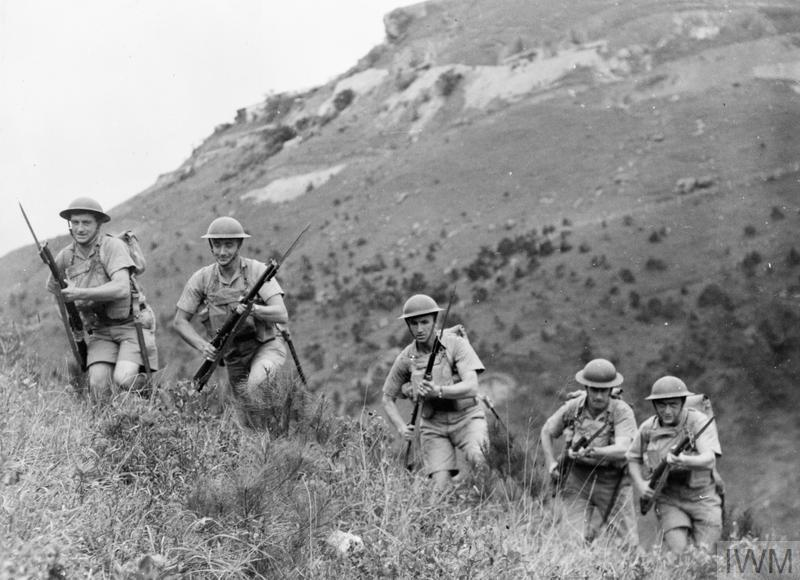
Canadian soldiers on exercise in Hong Kong prior to the Japanese invasion of the colony in 1941

In December 1941, two Canadian battalions participated in the Battle of Hong Kong, while the 2nd Canadian Division led the Dieppe Raid in August 1942. The First Canadian Army was also formed in 1942, to prepare for the invasion of northwest Europe.

In July 1943, the 1st and 5th Canadian Divisions took part in the Allied invasion of Sicily as part of the British Eighth Army. They also participated in the Allied invasion of Italy, facing intense combat in the Battle of Ortona and the Moro River Campaign. In spring 1944, Canadian units under Lieutenant-General E. L. M. Burns played a leading role in breaking through the Hitler Line, and later breached the Gothic Line after the Battle of Rimini. In total, 92,757 Canadian soldiers served in the Italian campaign, with 5,764 casualties.

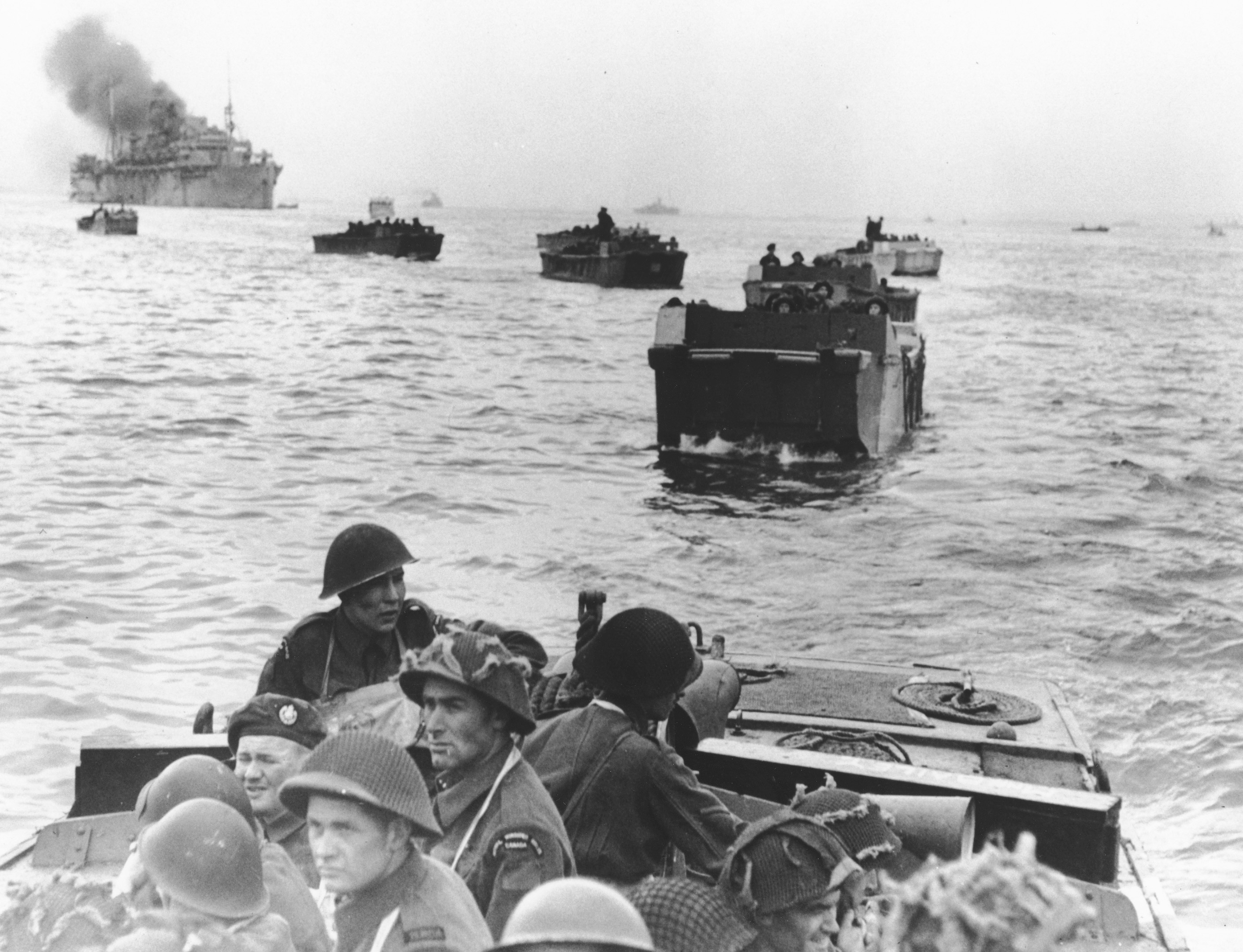
A landing craft with the Royal Winnipeg Rifles heads for Juno Beach during the Normandy landings in June 1944

On June 6, 1944, during the Normandy landings, the 3rd Canadian Division and the 2nd Canadian Armoured Brigade secured Juno Beach, supported by earlier landings of Canadian airborne troops behind the beaches. The Canadians led the breakout from the Normandy bridgehead, notably at the Falaise pocket. Afterwards, the First Canadian Army conducted campaigns to clear coastal fortress, like Operation Astonia. From October to November, the Canadians fought a series of battles to secure the Scheldt and open Antwerp to Allied shipping.

In early 1945, Canadian units fought in the Siegfried Line campaign, clearing a path to the Rhine and enabling Allied offensives further beyond the river. After the campaign, the First Canadian Army participated in the liberation of the Netherlands and the Western Allied invasion of Germany. Around 237,000 Canadian soldiers served in North West Europe campaign in 1944 and 1945, among whom 11,336 died.

==== Naval operations ====
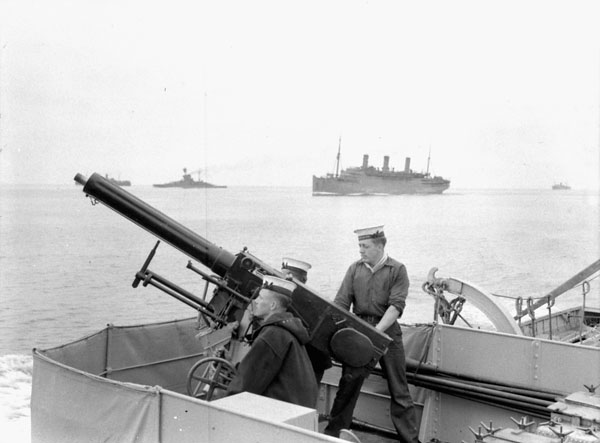
Royal Canadian Navy sailors man a gun aboard HMCS Assiniboine, while escorting an HX convoy to the UK

The RCN expanded significantly during the war, with 99,688 servicemen, around 6,500 servicewomen, and 471 combat ships by war's end. The navy protected supply and troop convoys from U-boat wolfpacks during the Battle of the Atlantic. After the Atlantic Convoy Conference in 1943, all Allied convoys north of New York City were coordinated through the Canadian Northwest Atlantic Command. RCN warships sank 33 enemy U-boats during the war.

In addition to the Atlantic campaign, the RCN participated in the Dunkirk evacuation, the Allied landing in North Africa, and the Normandy landings. The light cruiser HMCS Uganda also participated in the Pacific War as a part of the British Pacific Fleet. The navy lost 24 warships during the war, the largest being the destroyer HMCS Athabaskan. In addition to the RCN, Canadians also served with the Canadian Merchant Navy.

==== Air operations ====
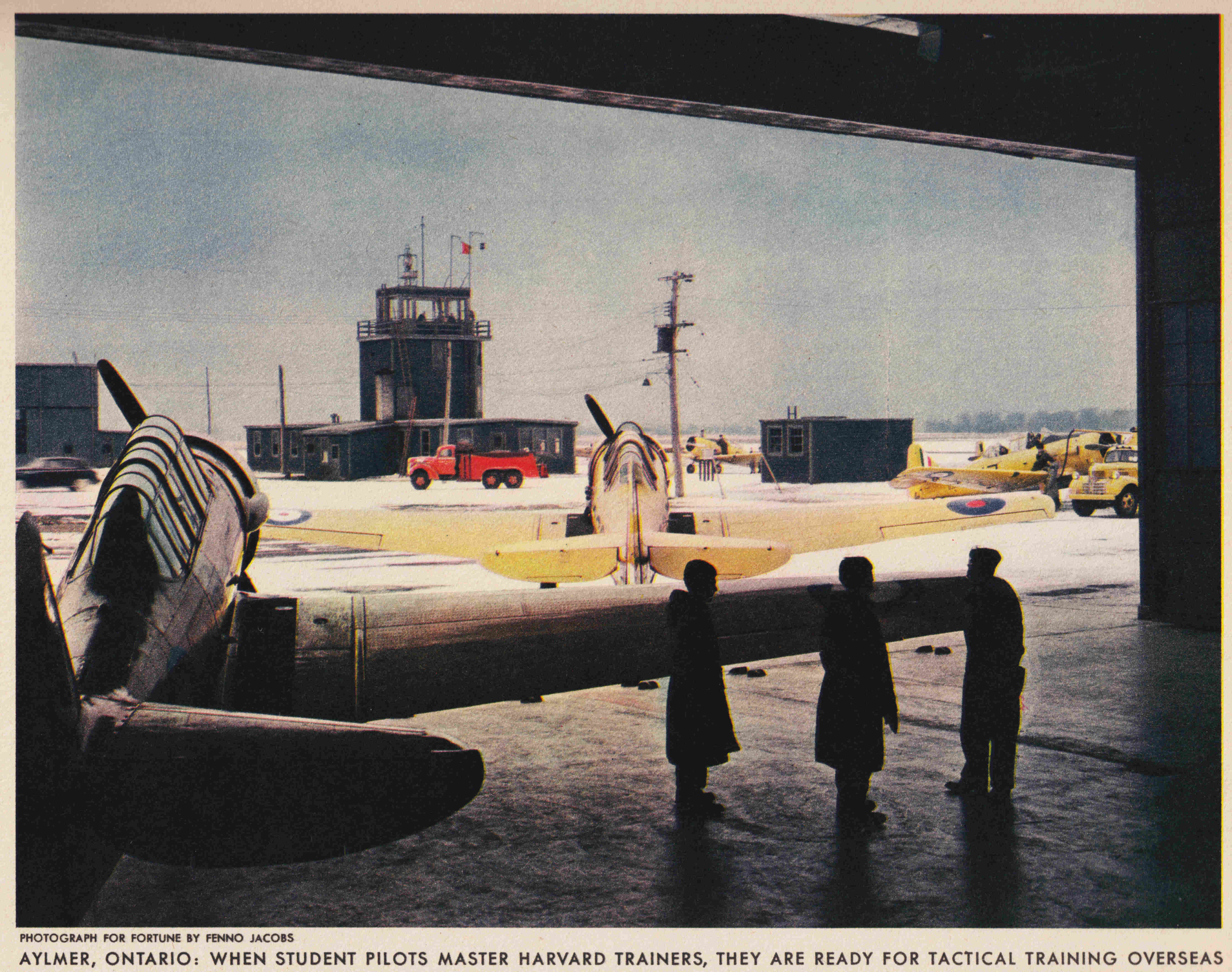
Harvard Trainers at a BCATP flying school at RCAF Station Aylmer

The RCAF also contributed to the war effort, although its manpower was initially hindered by the British Commonwealth Air Training Plan (BCATP), which trained aircrews for the UK, Canada, Australia, and New Zealand. While Canada hosted most BCATP facilities and funded three-quarters of the costs, the British expected graduates to join the Royal Air Force (RAF). However, intervention from Mackenzie King allowed some Canadian graduates to join the RCAF instead. As a result of the earlier arrangement, many Canadian BCATP graduates served in RAF units like No. 242 (Canadian) Squadron RAF, instead of RCAF units. At its peak, BCATP included 107 schools and 184 ancillary units across Canada. By the end of 1945, 131,553 pilots graduated from BCATP in Canada, serving with the RAF, RCAF, or other Allied air forces.

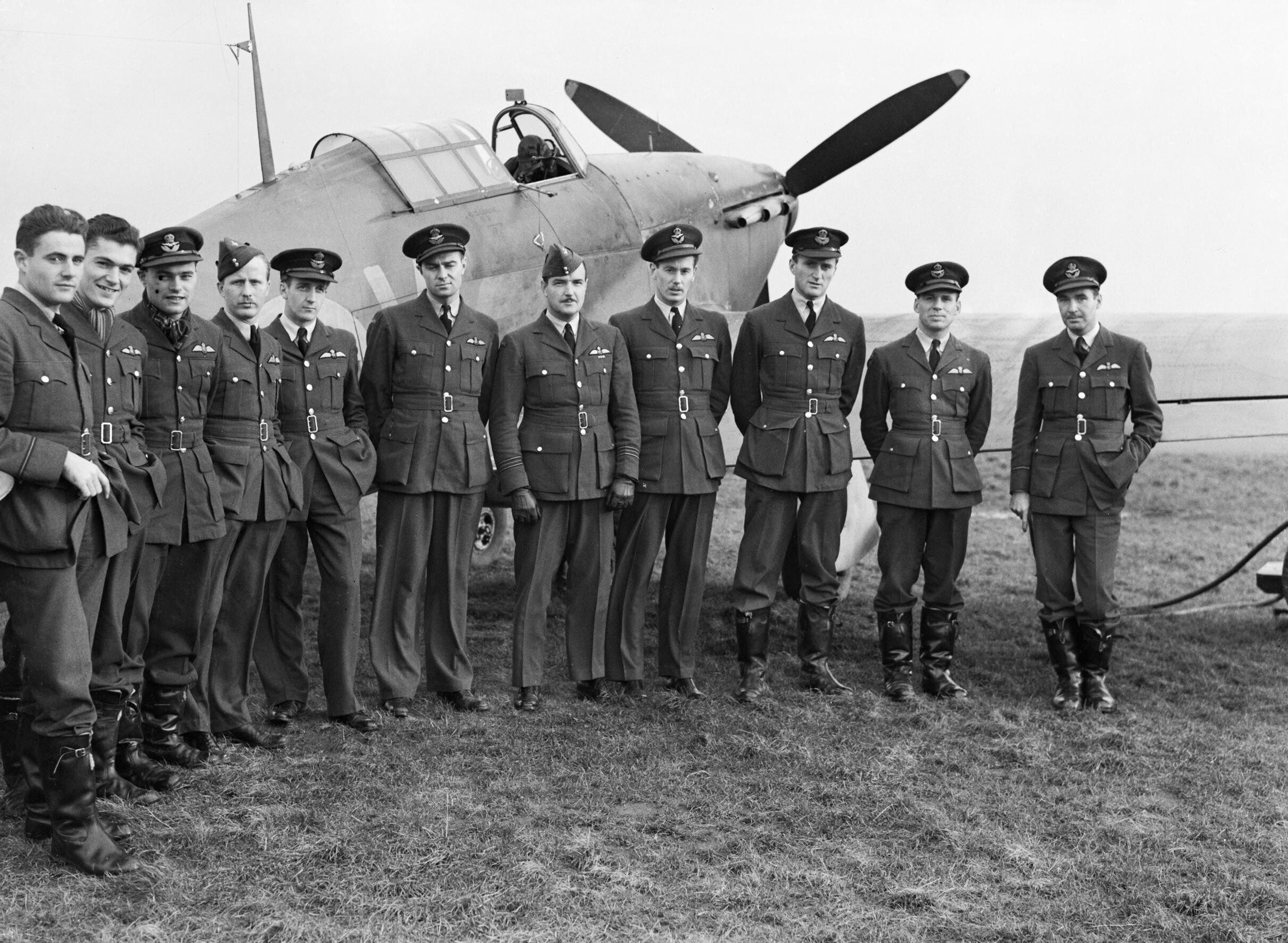
Pilots of No. 1 Squadron RCAF in October 1940. The squadron was deployed to the UK in June 1940, before the Battle of Britain.

Although the BCATP initially delayed the RCAF's deployment overseas, by war's end, 48 RCAF squadrons were stationed abroad in every major theatre, including North Africa, Italy, northwest Europe, and the Pacific. RCAF units participated in campaigns including the Battle of Britain, the Combined Bomber Offensive, and the Aleutian Islands campaign. In addition, they also conducted anti-submarine operations in the Atlantic. Throughout the war, 232,632 men and 17,030 women served in the RCAF, with 17,101 dead. By the end of the war, the RCAF was the fourth-largest Allied air force.

==== Industry and research ====
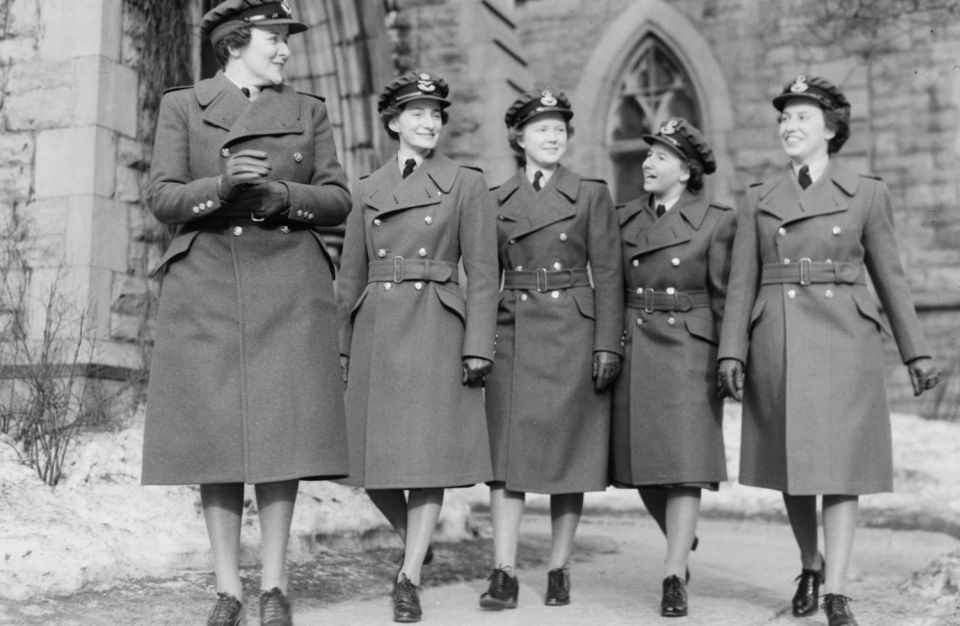
Members of the Royal Canadian Air Force Women's Division. During the Second World War, women were recruited into the military to fill non-combat roles.

Canadian industries produced 815,729 units of war materials during the conflict, including small arms, warships, aircraft, and vehicles. Over half of Canada's output was sent to the UK, facilitated by the Billion Dollar Gift package. Labour shortages prompted many women to enter the workforce for the first time, filling roles left by enlisted men. The Canadian Women's Army Corps and the RCAF Women's Division were created to relieve servicemen for frontline duties.

Canada also supported British and American efforts to develop an atomic bomb. In 1942, the Canadian government acquired the Eldorado Mine to mine uranium, and formed a nuclear research partnership with the UK, establishing the Montreal Laboratory to house the British Tube Alloys nuclear program. The British and Americans agreed to cooperate on nuclear weapons development during the First Quebec Conference in 1943, and the Montreal Laboratory was absorbed into the Manhattan Project.

=== Cold War ===
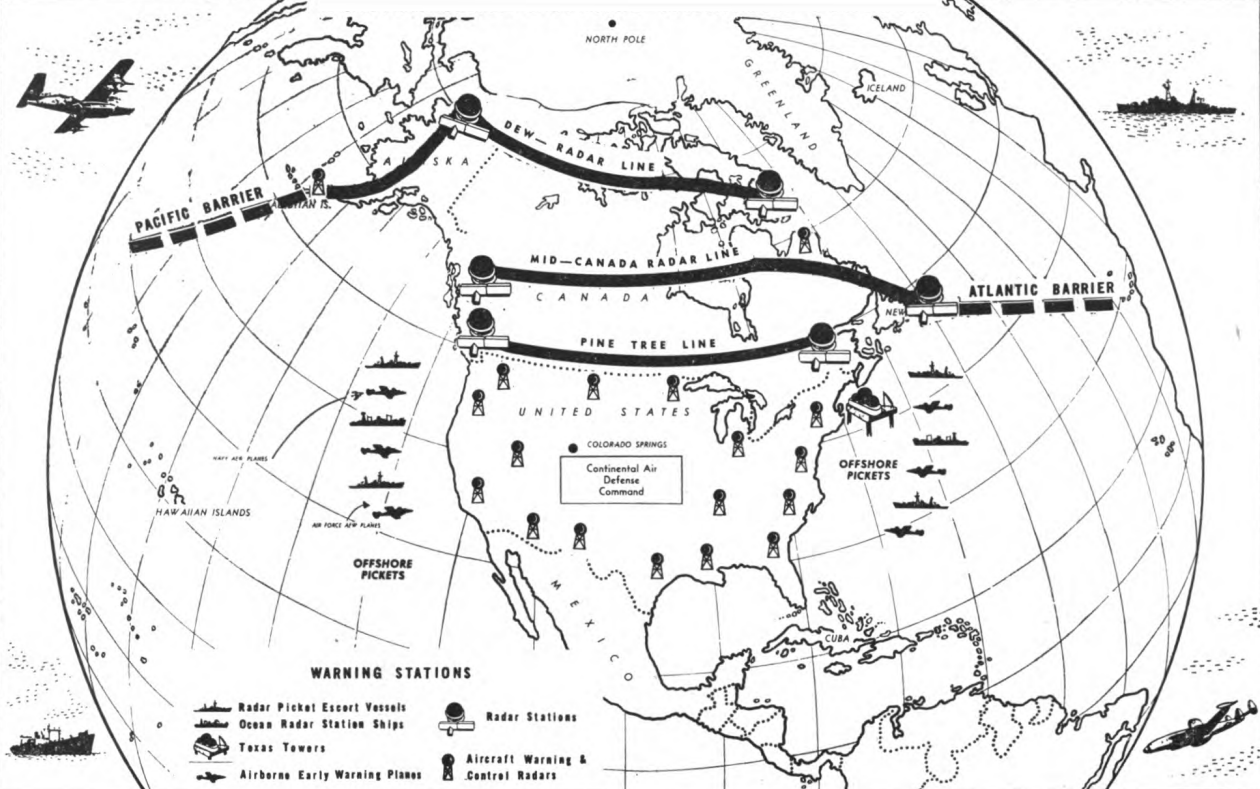
A map depicting the early warning systems for North America. Three early-warning radar lines in Canada were built during the 1950s to detect incoming Soviet bombers heading for the continent.

The defection of a Soviet cipher clerk in Ottawa in September 1945 and subsequent allegations of a Soviet spy ring marked the beginning of the Cold War in Canada. As a founding NATO member and NORAD signatory, Canada was aligned with the Western Bloc against the Communist bloc. In the 1950s, Canada partnered with the US to establish early-warning radar systems, including the Pinetree Line, Mid-Canada Line, and the DEW Line, to defend against Soviet attacks.

As a middle power, Canada recognized its military constraints and embraced multilateralism, making its military contributions dependent upon being part of a larger multilateral coalition. As a result, it refrained from direct involvement in conflicts like the Vietnam War, despite the involvement of close allies.

==== Korean War ====
At the start of the Korean War (1950–1953), Canada quickly backed the establishment of United Nations Command to liberate South Korea. Canadian units in Korea were integrated into the larger British Commonwealth Forces Korea. Canada initially contributed three RCN destroyers and the No. 426 Squadron, a RCAF military transport squadron, to support the war effort. Eight RCN ships rotated duties in Korean waters during the war, protecting the UN fleet and supporting onshore operations. In Korea, 22 RCAF fighter pilots also flew jets on exchange duty with the United States Air Force (USAF).

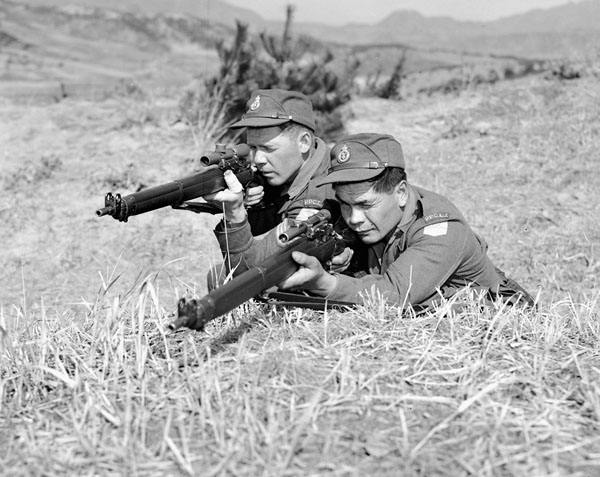
Two snipers of Princess Patricia's Canadian Light Infantry in Korea during the Korean War.

Having undergone rapid demilitarization after the Second World War, the Canadian Army required several months to mobilize back to wartime strength. Domestic pressure for a larger commitment led the Canadian Army to form Special Force (later renamed the 25th Canadian Infantry Brigade) for deployment in Korea. The first Canadian Army units arrived in Korea in December 1950, following its early campaigns and the onset of the attrition phase, when the fighting had largely settled along the 38th parallel. For army units, the war was characterized as a "war of patrols" in mountainous terrain. Battles the Canadian Army fought in include the battles of Kapyong and Kowang-san.

Canada sent 26,791 troops to fight in Korea. There were 1,558 Canadian casualties, including 516 dead. Hostilities ceased with the 1953 Korean Armistice Agreement. Following the armistice, Canada stationed a garrison in the region to patrol the Korean Demilitarized Zone until 1955. The last Canadian soldiers under United Nations Command departed the region in 1957.

==== Forces in Europe ====
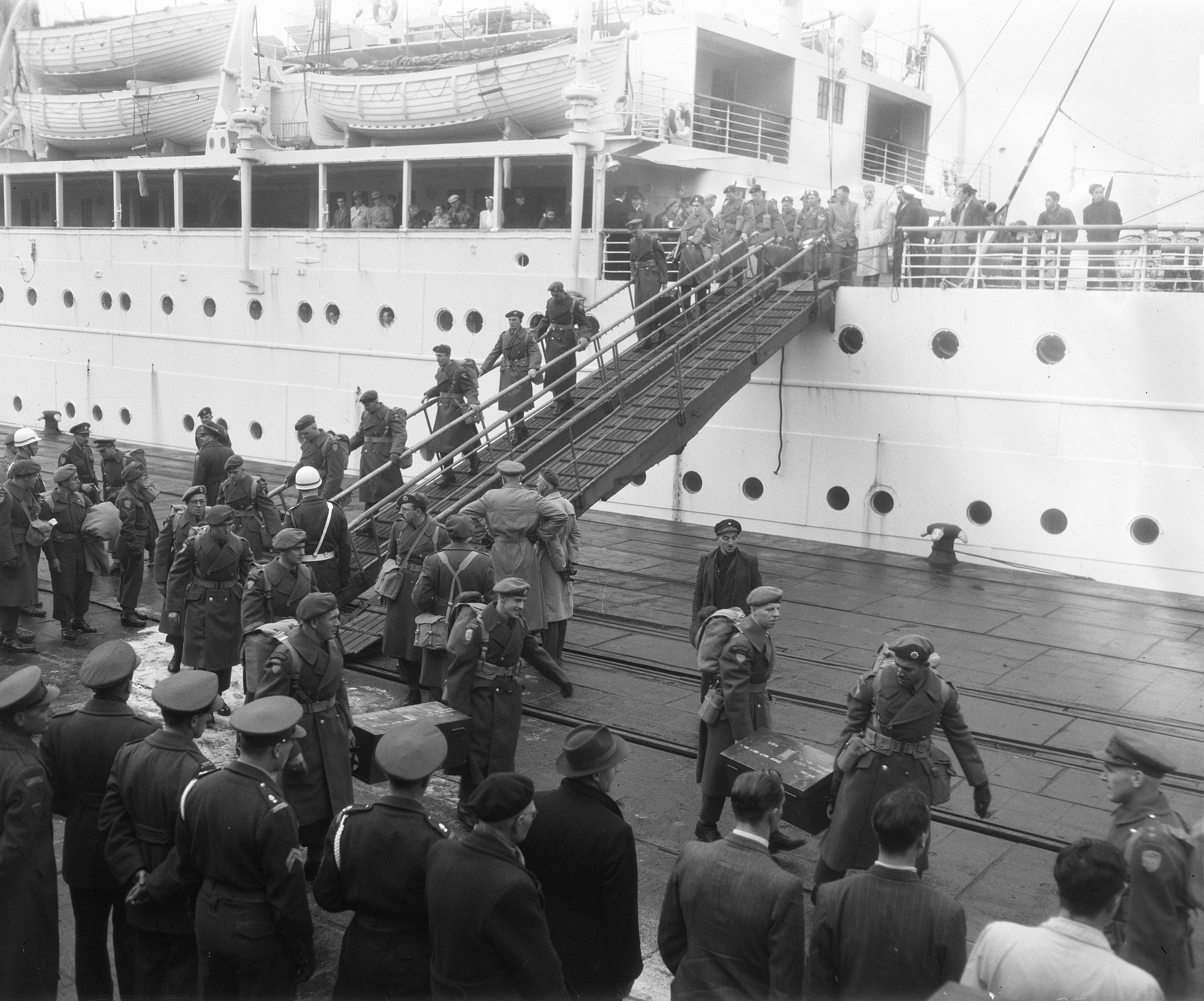
Members of the 27th Canadian Infantry Brigade, a brigade created for service in West Germany, disembark in Rotterdam, 1951

During the Cold War, Canada deployed its military abroad for the first time during peacetime, maintaining units in Western Europe from the early 1950s to 1993. Around 100,000 Canadian military personnel served in France and West Germany as part of Canadian Forces Europe.

In adherence to NATO obligations, Canada formed the 27th Canadian Infantry Brigade (27CIBG), later designated as 4 Combat Group and 4 Canadian Mechanized Brigade, for service in West Germany. It initially comprised 6,700 soldiers organized into several units, including three infantry battalions, an armoured regiment, and MGR-1 Honest John nuclear missile batteries. The brigade was reorganized following a 1970 defence review, losing its nuclear capability and reducing its size. By 1977, it transitioned from a frontline role as a part of the British commitment in northern Germany to a rear area reserve force in the south.

In addition to the 27CIBG, Canada contributed two infantry battalion groups to NATO's quick reaction force, Allied Command Europe Mobile Force, in 1964. However, by the late 1960s, the commitment was reduced to one battalion. The Canadian Air-Sea Transportable Brigade Group (CAST), comprising 5,000 personnel, was another unit formed in 1968 to support Canada's European commitments. Though stationed in Canada, CAST was able to deploy to Norway within 30 days. CAST only deployed once for a military exercise in 1986 before disbandment in 1989.

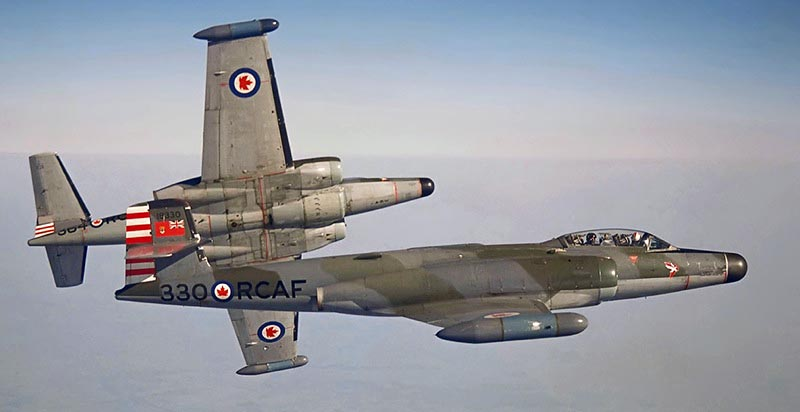
Two RCAF CF-100 Canucks from RCAF Station Grostenquin fly over Sardinia in 1962

In 1951, Canada formed the 1 Air Division to fulfil NATO air defence obligations. Initially a day/all-weather interception squadron, its role shifted to nuclear strike and reconnaissance in 1962, and then solely to reconnaissance in 1966. The 1 Air Division initially comprised two wings in France and two in Germany, although RCAF assets in France were relocated to Germany after the French withdrawal from NATO in 1966.

==== Unification of Canada's military ====
Canada began exploring military unification in the 1930s, having unified some administrative aspects and its military colleges by the 1940s and 1950s. In the 1960s, Canada pursued full military unification to reduce costs and eliminate service duplication. In 1964, the National Defence Act was amended to create a unified command structure under a single Chief of the Defence Staff. The Canadian Forces Reorganization Act, 1968 then merged the Army, RCN, and RCAF into a singular Canadian Armed Forces (CAF), ending their existence as separate entities.

The unification of Canada's military was only partly successful, with support services and headquarters commands being successfully unified, and its cost-cutting measures praised. However, efforts to unify ranking structure and service uniforms faced resistance from CAF personnel and the public, resulting in many of those changes being reversed by 2014.

==== October Crisis ====
A soldier in Montreal during the October Crisis in 1970

The October Crisis was instigated by the Montreal-based Front de libération du Québec's (FLQ) kidnapping of two government officials. On October 15, 1970, five days after the second kidnapping, the Quebec government requested military aid under the National Defence Act, with soldiers deployed to strategic locations in Montreal hours later. The following day, the federal government invoked the War Measures Act to confront the "apprehended insurrection," marking its only peacetime use.

Under the War Measures Act, the FLQ was banned and civil liberties were suspended. Troops were deployed to Quebec until January 1971. Ultimately, 12,500 Canadian Forces troops were stationed in Quebec, with 7,500 in Montreal. The federal government's use of the Act sparked controversy due to the unjust detention of most of those arrested, contributing to its replacement by the more restrained Emergencies Act in 1988.

==== Vietnam War ====
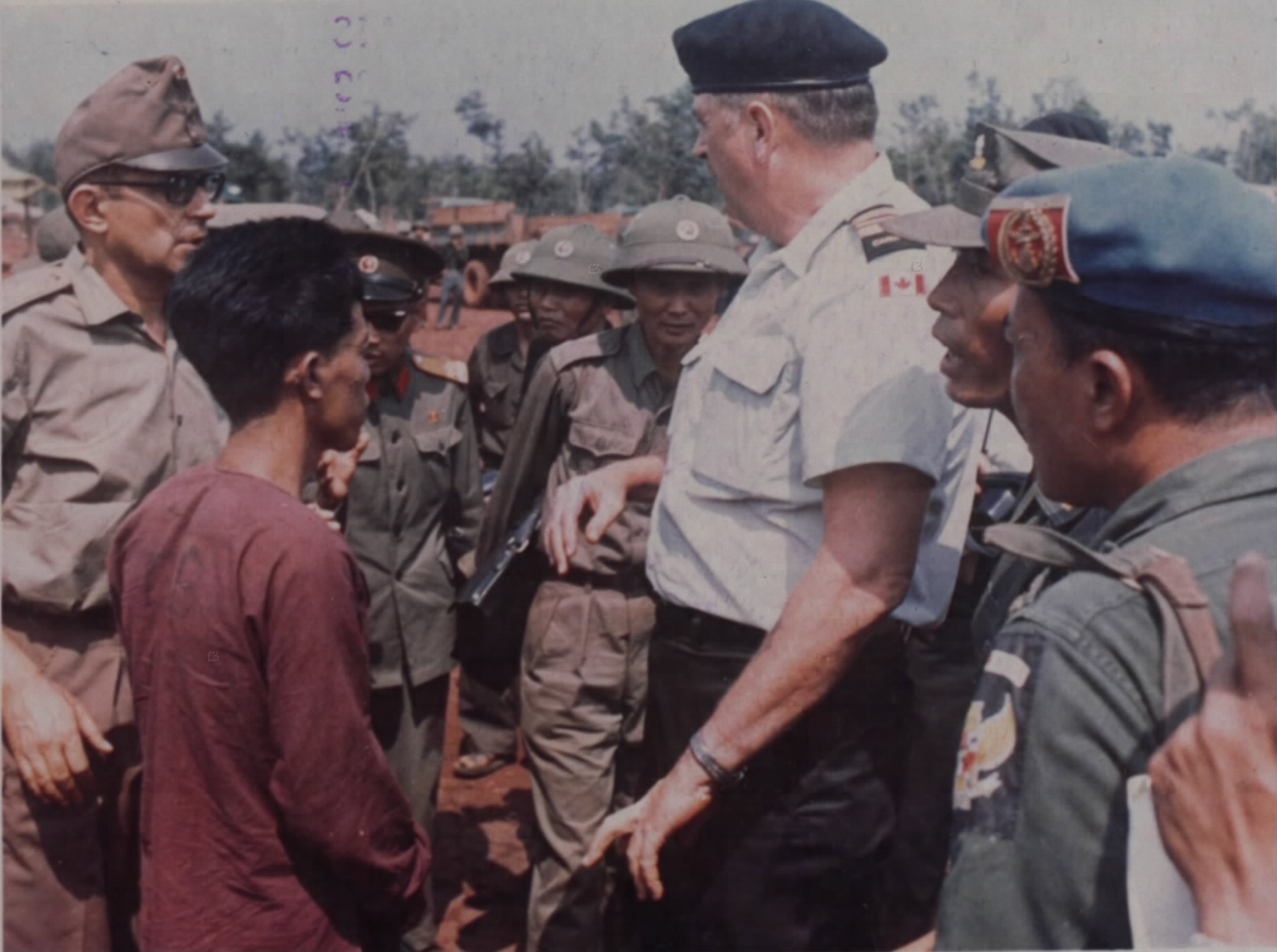
A POW is interviewed by a Canadian officer with the ICCS and a Provisional Revolutionary Government official in 1973.

Canada was a non-belligerent during the Vietnam War, and took part in two international truce commissions, the International Control Commission and the International Commission of Control and Supervision. Canada's military involvement in the conflict was minimal, with a small contingent deployed in 1973 to enforce the Paris Peace Accords.

Throughout the conflict, Canada became a haven for American Vietnam War resisters, with around 20,000 Vietnam draft dodgers and 12,000 military deserters seeking refuge in the country. However, in a countercurrent to the movement of American draft dodgers and deserters to Canada, around 12,000 Canadians and Canadian-American dual citizens enlisted with the United States Armed Forces and served in combat roles in Vietnam. Between 110 and 134 Canadians died during the conflict. In 2009, seven remained listed as missing in action.

=== Post-Cold War ===
In the 1990s, the CAF participated in multinational missions responding to international crises. The CAF also provided aid within Canada after natural disasters, deploying over 8,500 military personnel to Manitoba after the 1997 Red River flood, over 16,000 to aid in New Brunswick, Ontario, and Quebec after the 1998 North American ice storm. The 1998 ice storm marked the largest Canadian military response to a domestic natural disaster and the largest operational deployment since the Korean War.

==== Oka Crisis ====
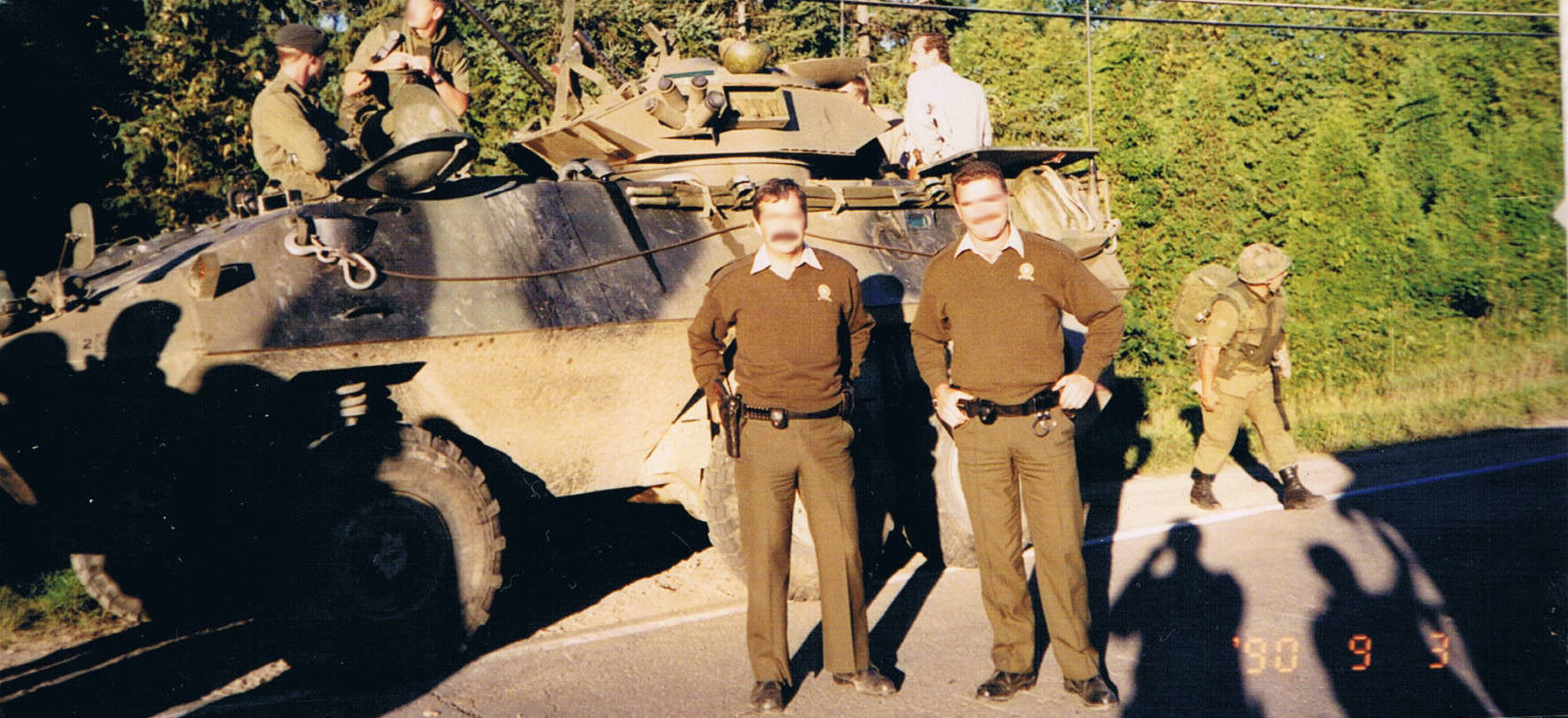
Canadian Forces personnel pictured behind two civilians of the Sûreté du Québec during the Oka Crisis in 1990.

The Oka Crisis was a land dispute between a Mohawk group and Oka, Quebec, from July 11 to September 26, 1990. After one police officer and two Mohawk were killed, Quebec Premier Robert Bourassa invoked Section 275 of the National Defence Act on August 8, requesting military support in "aid of the civil power".

The CAF mobilized 4,000 Quebec-based troops to support provincial authorities, staging at Kanesatake and Kahnawake, while reconnaissance aircraft gathered intelligence over Mohawk territory. A month after the military's deployment, the crisis ended with the departure of land defenders from the disputed grounds.

==== Gulf War ====
HMCS Protecteur supporting coalition forces during the Gulf War

Canada quickly joined the US-led UN coalition to liberate Kuwait after Iraq's invasion in 1990. Over 5,100 CAF personnel served, with 2,700 in theatre at its peak. Operations were coordinated under Operation Friction. The Gulf War marked the first time female CAF members served in combat roles.

A Canadian naval task force was sent to support the coalition, comprising destroyers HMCS Terra Nova and HMCS Athabaskan, and the supply ship HMCS Protecteur. The Canadian Task Group led the coalition maritime logistics forces in the Persian Gulf. Canadian warships conducted about a quarter of all inspections of vessels suspected of breaching the coalition blockade. Another destroyer, HMCS Huron, arrived after hostilities ceased and was the first allied ship to visit Kuwait.

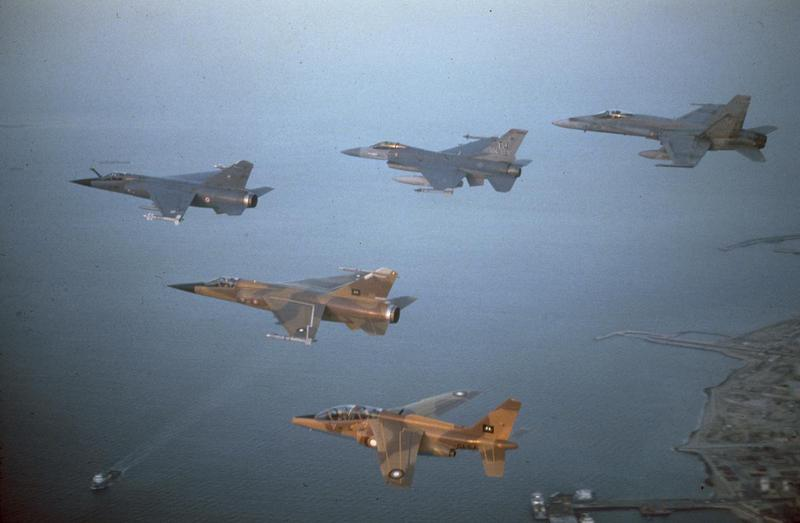
A formation of coalition aircraft flying over Saudi Arabia during the Gulf War, 1991. A Canadian CF-18 Hornet is visible in the right foreground.

The CAF also deployed a CF-18 Hornet and CH-124 Sea King squadron. When the air campaign began, 24 Canadian CF-18s joined coalition forces in providing air cover and targeting ground assets, including assisting in the destruction of the Iraqi Navy during the Battle of Bubiyan. The air war in Iraq was the first offensive combat operation Canadian military personnel took part in since the Korean War.

A 530-person military field hospital was also deployed by the CAF, attached to a larger British unit. In 1991, photographs of Canadian Military Engineers posing with dismembered bodies in a Kuwaiti minefield led to the unit being investigated.

==== Somali Civil War ====
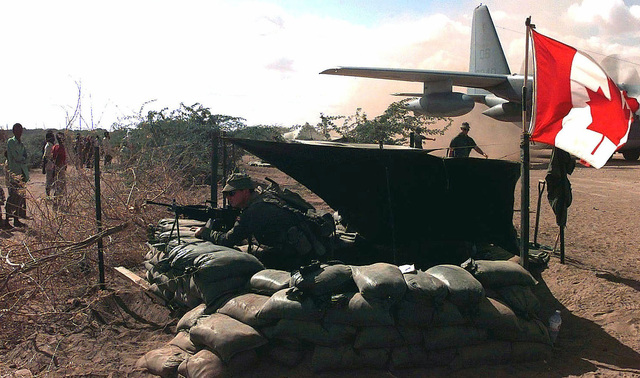
A security checkpoint operated by Canadian soldiers at Belet Huen Field in Somalia, 1993

The CAF supported UNOSOM I during the Somali Civil War, providing security, humanitarian relief, and ceasefire monitoring. In December 1992, the US-led, UN-sanctioned force, UNITAF, arrived in Somalia. The force included 23 countries, with Canada contributing about 1,400 troops from the Canadian Airborne Regiment and the naval support ship HMCS Preserver. In May 1993, the mission transitioned to UN control as UNOSOM II. However, as UNOSOM II faced strong local resistance and struggled to enforce a ceasefire, it largely focused on protecting food and medical aid distribution sites rather than restoring order.

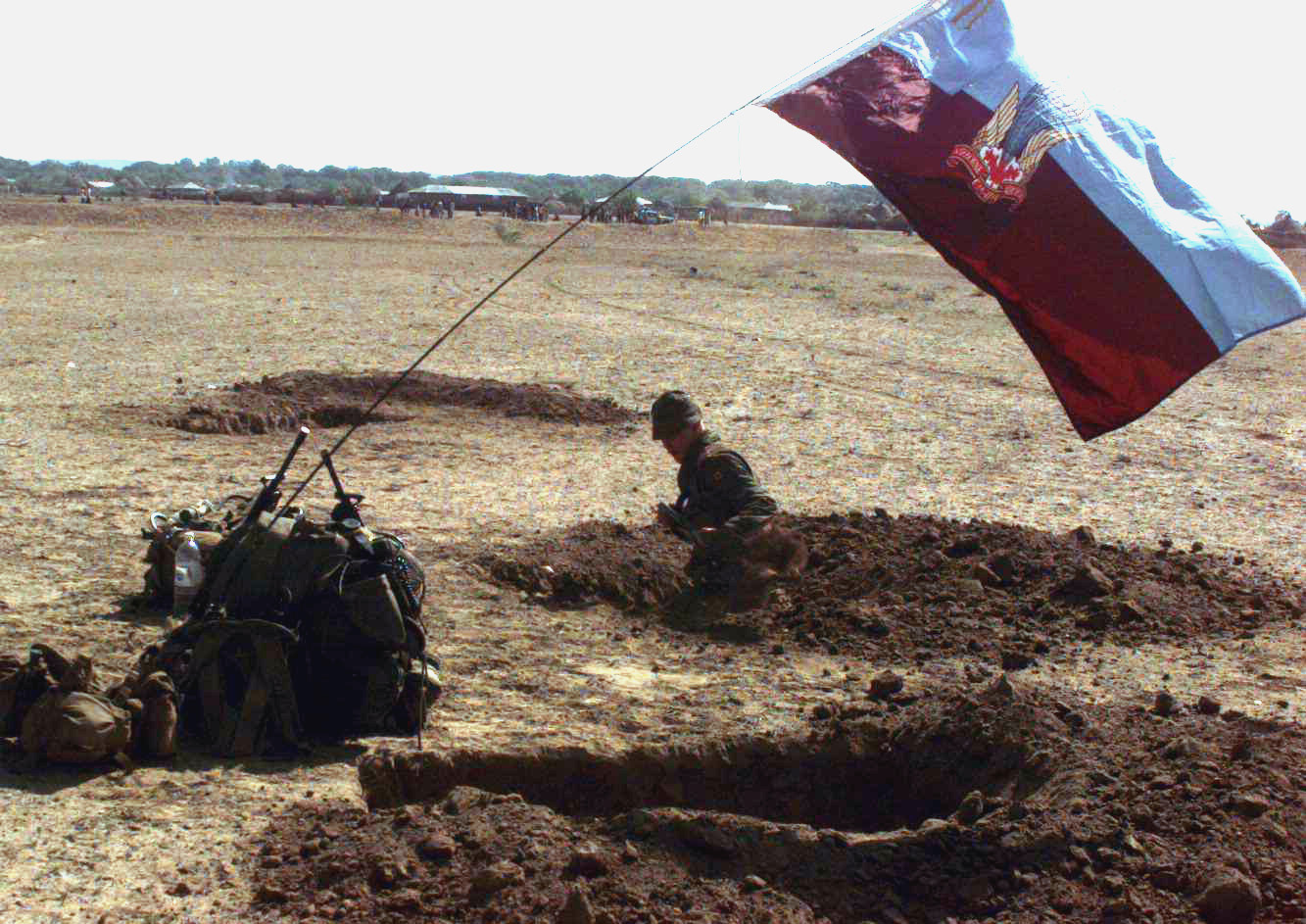
A Canadian Airborne Regiment member in a foxhole in Somalia. The conduct of the regiment in the country became a national scandal in Canada.

Based primarily in Beledweyne, Canadian forces rebuilt infrastructure, cleared landmines, and guarded aid convoys. However, the mission became a political disaster for Canada. Canadian soldiers were frequently harassed and their base often targeted by looters. In response, their commander authorized looters to be shot in the leg if they ran. Another officer later allowed thieves to be "captured and abused." In March 1993, members of the airborne unit were involved in two extrajudicial killings. The first involved a civilian who was shot while fleeing after breaking into their base for supplies, and the second involved a youth who was tortured and killed after breaking into the encampment. Cover-up attempts by senior officials at the Department of National Defence sparked a national scandal in Canada. A federal inquiry into the matter saw the end of several officers' careers, court-martials, and the airborne regiment's disbandment. The scandal damaged Canada's international reputation and was heralded as "the darkest era in the history of the Canadian military" since the Second World War.

The UN mission itself failed to restore order, with mounting casualties prompting the US to withdraw its forces after the Battle of Mogadishu. This experience largely halted the use of robust multinational military forces from western countries for humanitarian aid during civil conflicts.

==== Yugoslav Wars ====
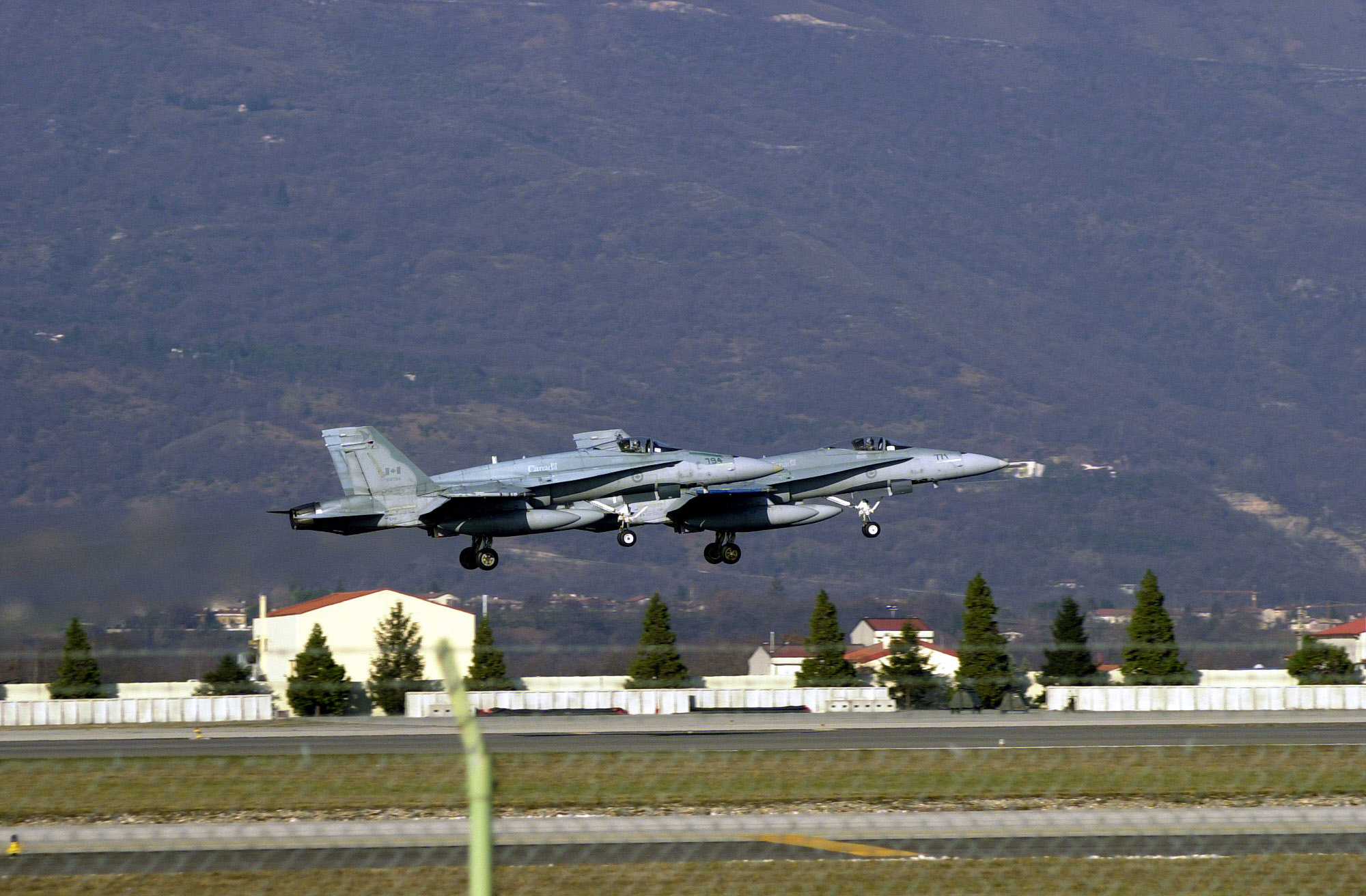
Two CF-18s with Operation Echo depart Aviano Air Base in Italy in 2000, in support of the NATO bombing of Yugoslavia.

Since 1991, about 40,000 CAF personnel and civilian police, including the Royal Canadian Mounted Police, participated in Balkans peacekeeping missions, beginning with the European Community Monitoring Mission in the Former Yugoslavia in 1991. This involvement spanned UN missions like UNCRO in Croatia, UNMIBH in Bosnia and Herzegovina, UNMIK in Kosovo, and UNPREDEP in North Macedonia. Additionally, they supported NATO missions included IFOR and SFOR in Bosnia and Herzegovina, the Kosovo Force, and task forces Harvest and Fox in North Macedonia, along with EU missions like EUFOR Concordia and Operation Althea.

In September 1993, the largest battle involving Canadian military personnel since the Korean War occurred when Canadian and French peacekeepers under UNPROFOR fought Croat forces for 15 hours. The Canadian-French contingent was tasked with securing the Medak pocket, a strategic salient between Croat and Serb forces when Operation Medak Pocket was launched by Croat forces. Initially targeting Serb positions, on September 15, Croat forces besieged the Canadian-French position at Medak pocket. The Canadian government reported 27 Croatian soldiers killed and four Canadians wounded during the exchange.

The CAF also contributed warships to NATO's maritime blockade of the region and 18 CF-18 Hornets in support of the 1999 NATO bombing of Yugoslavia. During the campaign, Canadian CF-18s flew 678 sorties, about 10 per cent of all NATO strike missions.

== 21st century ==
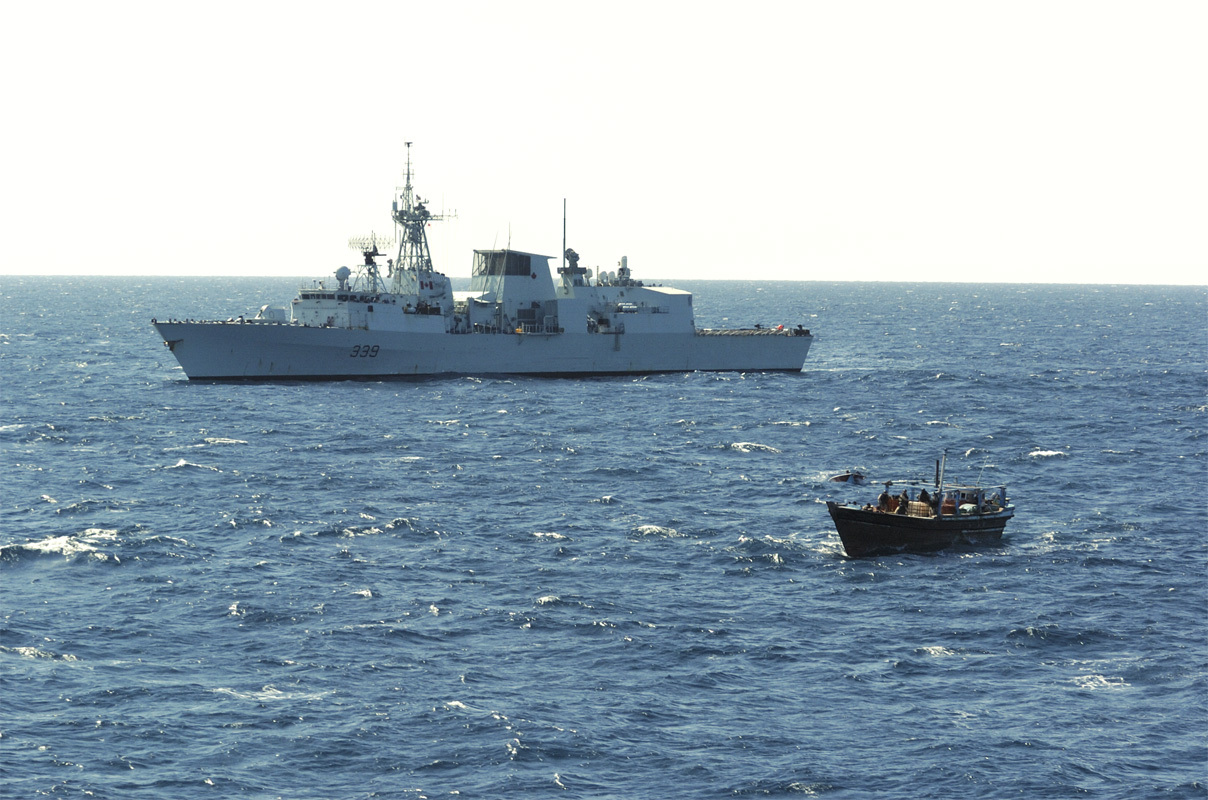
HMCS Charlottetown after it conducted a boarding of a vessel in the Arabian Sea in 2008. Charlottetown was deployed in support of Operation Altair, a naval anti-terrorism operation

During the early 21st century, Canada participated in multiple missions in support of the global war on terror, including the US-led Operation Enduring Freedom. This included security operations conducted in the Arabian Sea and Gulf of Oman from 2001 to 2012. This deployment marked the Canadian navy's largest since World War II, with 15 warships dispatched. At its peak in January 2002, six Canadian warships and 1,500 personnel were in the region, conducting patrols and intercepting suspected terrorists and illegal drug shipments.

While Canada participated in several multinational missions in the early 2000s, it abstained from joining the US-led coalition of the willing during the Iraq War. Although Canada was not directly involved in the Iraq War, its forces did help to relieve US naval assets during that conflict by expanding the CAF's role in Combined Task Force 151, a multinational task force combating piracy off the coast of Somalia. Several Canadians, serving as exchange officers with British and US units, also participated in the 2003 invasion of Iraq. Conversely, some US military personnel who opposed the Iraq War sought refuge in Canada after deserting to avoid deployment.

=== War in Afghanistan ===
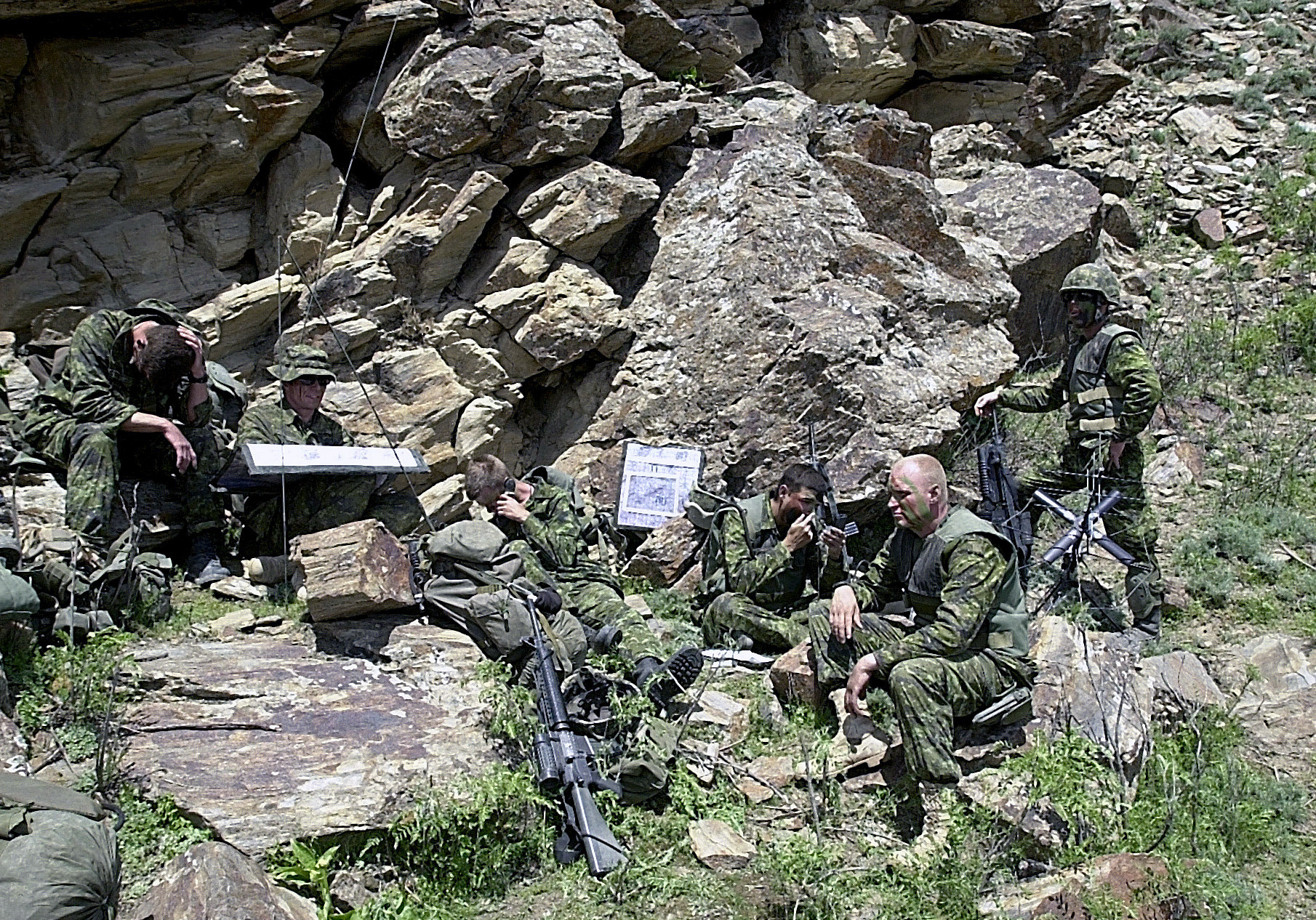
Canadian soldiers set up a command post in Tora Bora during Operation Torii, May 2002

Weeks after the September 11th attacks, Canada committed to joining the US-led war in Afghanistan (2001–2021). Canadian special forces participated in the initial invasion of Afghanistan in 2001, with an additional Canadian infantry battle group of 1,200 soldiers deployed to Kandahar in February 2002 to combat al-Qaeda and Taliban forces and support humanitarian efforts.

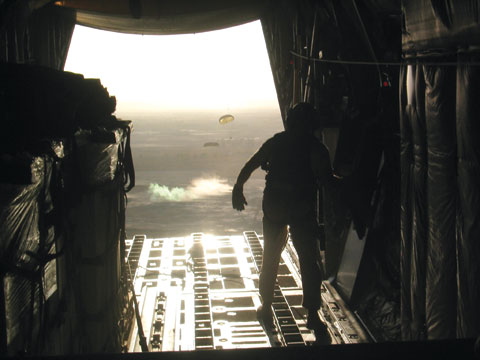
A Canadian C-130 Hercules conducts a cargo drop in Kandahar in support of coalition forces during Operation Medusa, 2006

Following the invasion, Canadian units operated within NATO's International Security Assistance Force (ISAF). The CAF contributed a 2,000-strong infantry battle group, alongside armoured, artillery, and aerial support, to ISAF. The battle group was stationed in Kabul from 2003 to 2005, tasked with providing security and disarming Afghan militias. In November 2005, the CAF launched Operation Archer, shifting its focus from Kabul to Kandahar. After its relocation to Kandahar, the battle group oversaw counter-insurgency operations and the province's Provincial Reconstruction Team. In Kandahar, the battle group achieved a series of victories like Operation Medusa. However, they were unable to root out all insurgents in the region, who took refuge on the Pakistani side of the Afghanistan-Pakistan border.

Public support for the war in Canada waned as casualties mounted in late 2006. This contributed to the selection of "the Canadian soldier" as the Canadian Press' Canadian Newsmaker of the Year. Support for the war dropped further after Joint Task Force 2 members were photographed handing over detainees to Afghan security forces, who were subsequently tortured. Despite mounting public opposition, the government remained committed to the war until 2011, partly due to the CAF's portrayal of the war as a success.

==== Withdrawal and legacy ====
The outgoing and incoming Canadian commanders embrance during a transfer of authority ceremony for NATO Training Mission-Afghanistan, March 2014

In 2011, Canada ended its combat operations in Afghanistan. However, some Canadian soldiers remained until March 2014 to train the Afghan National Army and National Police under NATO Training Mission-Afghanistan. Canadian Special Operations Forces Command personnel were briefly redeployed to Afghanistan during the 2021 Taliban offensive to evacuate Canadian citizens, close its embassy, and assist with the Kabul airlift.

Over 40,000 Canadian soldiers served in Afghanistan. The 12-year mission marked Canada's longest military campaign, with 165 Canadians killed, including 158 soldiers and seven civilians. The conflict marked the first instance a female CAF member was killed in combat, Captain Nichola Goddard of the Royal Canadian Horse Artillery.

=== Libyan Civil War ===
On 25 February 2011, the CAF launched Operation Mobile, an evacuation mission in response to the First Libyan Civil War. On March 19, the operation expanded to include air and maritime combat missions to support the 2011 military intervention in Libya to enforce UN Security Council Resolution 1973. NATO assumed command of the multinational coalition through Operation Unified Protector, with Lieutenant General Charles Bouchard of the RCAF appointed as operational commander. The coalition enforced a no-fly zone to prevent pro-Gaddafi forces from conducting air attacks on anti-Gaddafi forces and civilian areas.

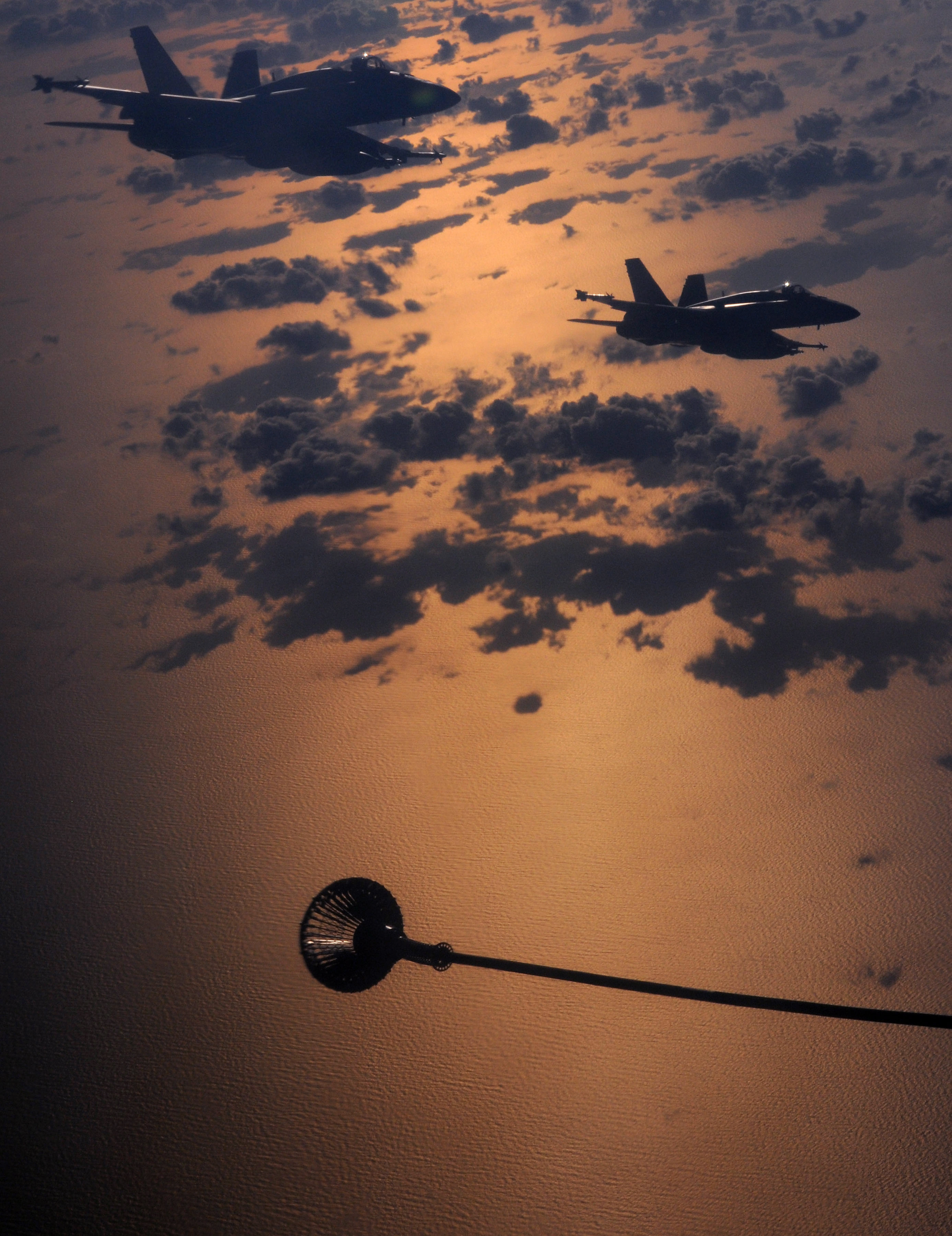
RCAF CF-18 Hornets refuelling from a British tanker during the First Libyan Civil War in 2011.

At its peak, 655 Canadians were deployed on Operation Mobile, including seven CF-18 fighter jets. The frigate HMCS Charlottetown, already in the Mediterranean as a part of Standing NATO Maritime Group 1, also patrolled Libya's coast. In May 2011, Charlottetown came under hostile fire from a shore battery, marking the first attack on a Canadian warship since the Korean War. On October 28, Prime Minister Stephen Harper declared the successful end of the mission.

=== Mali War ===
After insurgent groups took control of parts of Mali, the Malian government requested military aid from France in January 2013. France sought assistance from NATO allies to support its operation in Mali, including Canada, which initially provided a C-17 Globemaster III transport aircraft. From 2015 to 2022, the CAF supported French counter-insurgency operations in the Sahel, deploying over 1,250 personnel for helicopter medical evacuations from 2018 to 2019. The CAF began a phased withdrawal from Mali in 2019 as the Romanian Armed Forces assumed responsibility the operation's helicopter medevacs. All remaining CAF personnel were withdrawan from Mali in November 2023.

=== War against the Islamic State ===
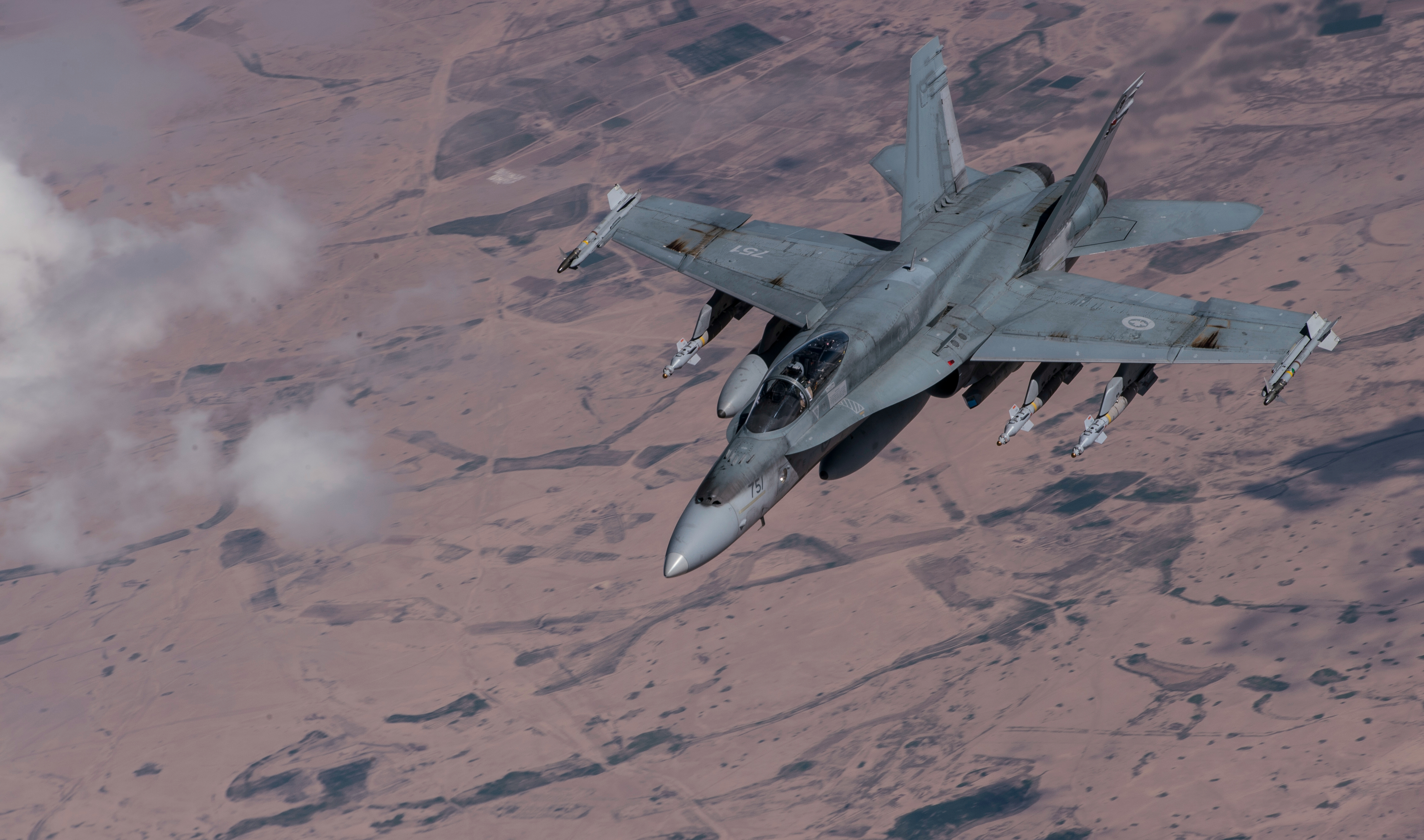
A RCAF CF-18 Hornet breaks away from a USAF KC-135 Stratotanker, while on mission in support of Operation Impact.

In September 2014, Canada joined a global coalition against the Islamic State. From November 2014 to February 2016, Canadian CF-18s conducted 251 airstrikes in Iraq and five in Syria. In February 2016, the CAF reoriented its mission from combat operations to training, reducing the size of its mission. The mission deployments are based at a logistics hub in Kuwait and include training missions in Iraq, Jordan, and Lebanon.

Canadian special forces were deployed to support the training mission. The conflict saw increased use of special forces in favour of conventional forces to address asymmetric threats in grey-zone operations. In 2021, they participated in two Iraqi Armed Forces operations in non-combat roles. Another Canadian special forces operator was involved in Talon Anvil, a 20-person USAF special operations group criticized for bypassing rules intended to safeguard civilians, resulting in hundreds of non-combatant deaths.

=== Renewed Arctic focus ===
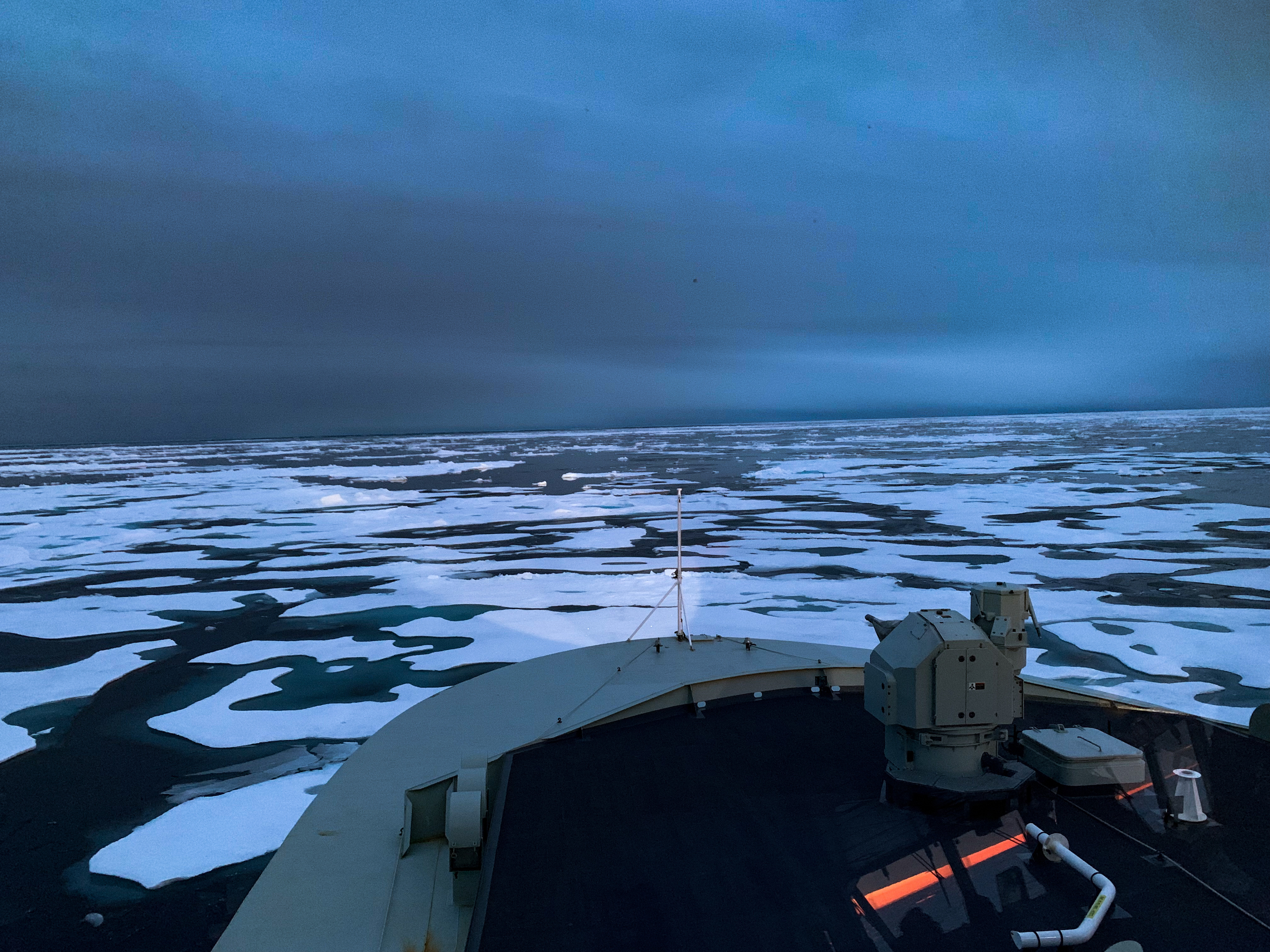
HMCS Harry DeWolf demonstrates its icebreaking capabilities during its maiden deployment in the Northwest Passage, 2021

In the 2020s, Canada renewed its military focus on the Arctic as part of its broader Arctic policy, citing security concerns over Russia and China. However, delays in completing the Nanisivik Naval Facility on Baffin Island, commissioned in 2007, has left a gap in Canada's Arctic capabilities. To address this, Canada announced major investments including 88 F-35 fighter jets, eight icebreaking ships, and 12 under-ice submarines. Arctic operating hubs were also planned for Yellowknife, Iqaluit, and Inuvik. However, the potential land impact of these initiatives raised concerns among Indigenous communities, with Inuit leaders calling for meaningful consultation and involvement in decision-making process.

== Peacekeeping efforts ==
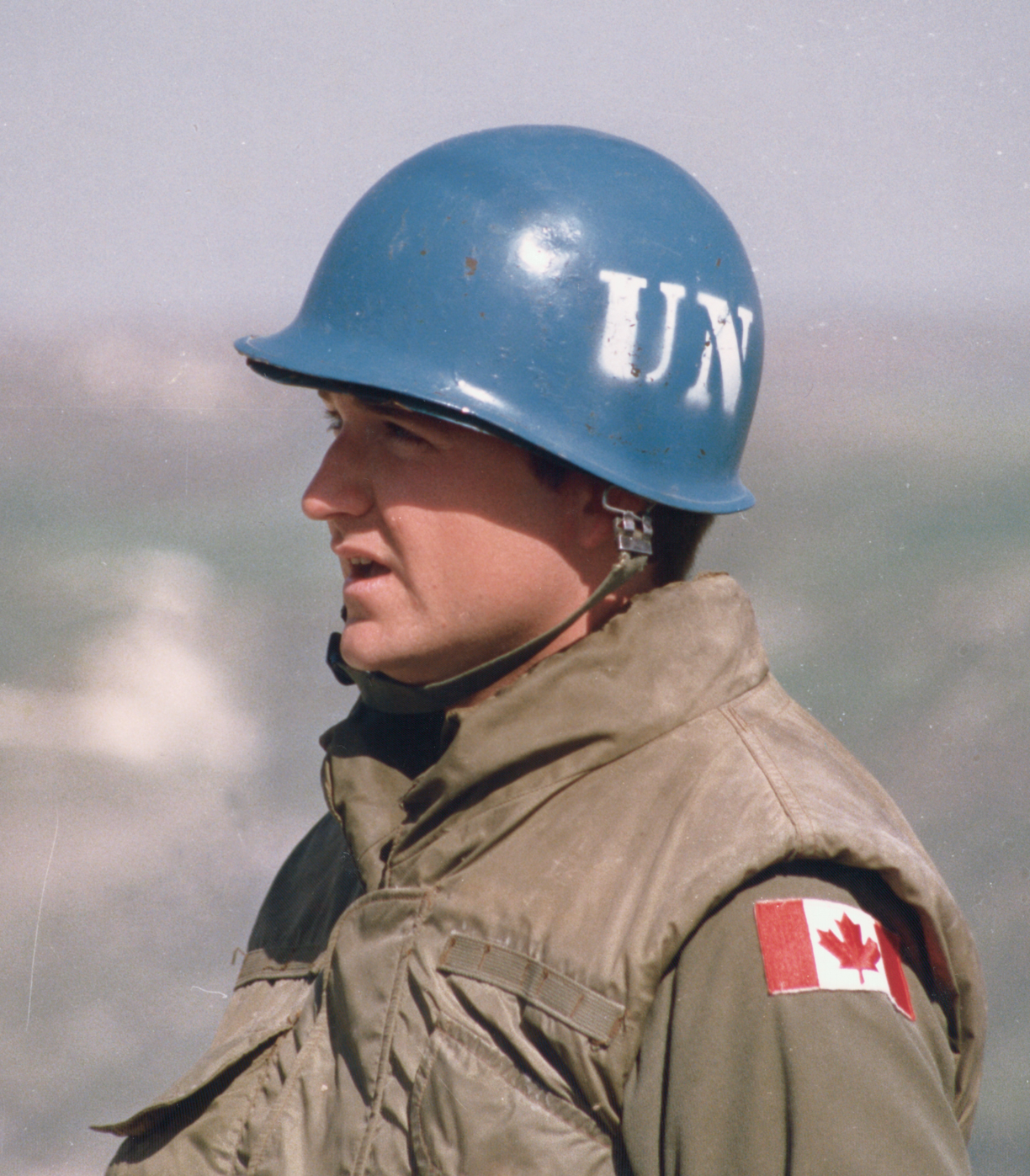
Canadian peacekeeper in 1976 wearing the distinctive flag of Canada and UN blue helmet

Canada has participated in over 50 peacekeeping missions, including every UN effort from its inception to 1989. Over 125,000 Canadians served as peacekeepers, with around 130 Canadians having died during these operations. Canada's support for multilateralism and internationalism are closely tied to its peacekeeping efforts.

Canada's role in the development of and participation in peacekeeping during the 20th century shaped its reputation as a positive middle power. Canada's successful mediation of the 1956 Suez Crisis gave it credibility as a country committed to the common good. The Canadian public increasingly identified peacekeeping as the country's foremost contribution to international affairs.

Canada faced controversy over its involvement in some peacekeeping missions, prompting a military reassessment in the late 1990s. By the 21st century, Canadian involvement in UN peacekeeping greatly declined, with its peacekeeping efforts reallocated to UN-sanctioned operations through NATO. This shift resulted in more militarized and lethal peacekeeping operations, rather than traditional peacekeeping duties.

== See also ==
- Conscription in Canada
- History of Canadian foreign policy
- List of Anglo-French conflicts on Hudson Bay
- List of Canadian military operations
- List of Canadian Victoria Cross recipients
- List of French forts in North America
- List of wars involving Canada
- Military history of the Acadians
- Military history of the Mi'kmaq
- Military history of Nova Scotia
