= Mine clearance organization =

Organization that removes landmines

A mine clearance organization, or demining organization, is an organization involved in the removal of landmines and unexploded ordnance (UXO) for military, humanitarian, or commercial reasons. Demining includes mine clearance (actual removal and destruction of landmines/UXO from the ground), as well as surveying, mapping and marking of hazardous areas.

The broader realm of mine action also includes advocacy, victim assistance, antipersonnel mine stockpile destruction, mine risk education and research. The aim is to clear land so that civilians can return to their homes and their everyday routines without the threat of landmines and unexploded remnants of war (ERW), which include unexploded ordnance and abandoned explosive ordnance. This means that all the mines and ERW affecting the places where ordinary people live must be cleared, and their safety in areas that have been cleared must be guaranteed. Mines are cleared and the areas are verified so that they can say that the land is now safe, and people can use it without worrying about the weapons.

== Government ==
After the Second World War, large-scale multinational naval mine clearance operations were carried out by the International Central Mine Clearance Board, and, in northern European waters, by the German Mine Sweeping Administration. A French officer of the Int'l Central Mine Clearance Board's subordinate Mediterranean Zone Board witnessed "Operation Retail" on 12–13 November 1946, the Royal Navy clearance of sea mines during the Corfu Channel incident.

In the 21st century, the main governments that fund humanitarian mine clearance are the United States (US), the European Union (EU), Japan, Norway, and the Netherlands, which accounted in 2014 for 72% of all international funding. Germany, the UK, and Denmark are also significant donors.

=== Danish Demining Group ===
DDG logo

Danish Demining Group (DDG) was established in 1997 and today functions as a humanitarian mine action unit within the Danish Refugee Council (DRC), hence benefiting from synergies in cooperation. As of August 2012, DDG is operating with clearance of mines and explosive remnants of war in Afghanistan, Iraq, Libya, Somalia (including Somaliland), Sri Lanka, South Sudan, Uganda, Ukraine and Yemen. DDG also works with armed violence reduction in several countries.

== Non-Governmental organizations (NGOs) ==
=== APOPO ===
APOPO trains Giant pouched rats from East Africa to detect landmines. This unusual idea has been developed into a competitive technology by a group of Belgian and Tanzanian researchers and animal trainers. APOPO is a non-profit organization that has partnered with the Belgian Government, Geneva International Centre for Humanitarian Demining (GICHD), the European Union (EU), the Province of Antwerp (Belgium), the Flemish Community, the US Army, the World Bank and private donors. It has further partnered in demining with Menschen gegen Minen (MgM), Norwegian People's Aid (NPA), Accelerated Demining Programme (ADP), Handicap International (HI) and Empresa Moçambicana de Desminagem (EMD).

=== DanChurchAid ===
DanChurchAid (Folkekirkens Nødhjælp) is one of the major Danish humanitarian non governmental organisations (NGO), working with churches and non-religious civil organizations to assist the poor with dignity. DCA mine action is currently involved in comprehensive mine action programmes in Ukraine, Lebanon, South Sudan and Iraq.

=== Demining Research Community ===
The Demining Research Community is an American nonprofit organization that researches and develops uses of remote sensing and machine learning to improve the efficiency and safety of landmine and unexploded ordnance (UXO) detection.

=== DEMIRA ===
DEMIRA (Deutsche Minenraeumer e.V.) is an international, humanitarian, non-governmental organization (NGO) registered in Germany. DEMIRA NGO was founded in 1996 in order to provide humanitarian mine clearance, EOD (Explosive Ordnance Disposal), emergency medical aid and disaster relief to people living in postwar countries and to victims of natural disasters and civil unrest.

=== Fondation suisse de déminage (FSD) ===
The Fondation suisse de déminage (FSD) was formed in 1997 in Geneva, Switzerland. FSD is a humanitarian organisation specialising in the removal of the hazardous remnants of war, such as land mines, unexploded shells from artillery and tank fire, air-dropped bombs, and all manner of dangerous, unexploded military ordnance. FSD's work is conducted for humanitarian purposes. FSD is a non-political, non-aligned, independent, non-government organisation based in Geneva.

FSD also conducts disaster relief work, with major interventions in Sri Lanka following the 2004 Indian Ocean tsunami and during the January–March 2008 cold weather crisis in Tajikistan. FSD has conducted interventions in 21 countries since 1998, and is currently engaged in implementing 8 programmes worldwide, these are Afghanistan, Centrafrican Republic, Chad, Colombia, Iraq, Philippines, Tajikistan and Ukraine. FSD also conducted support operations for the World Food Programme (WFP) as a stand-by partner from 2001.

=== Golden West Humanitarian Foundation ===
The Golden West Humanitarian Foundation is an American nonprofit organization that developed mine clearance technology.

=== HAMAP-Humanitaire ===
Created in 1999, HAMAP-Humanitaire is a French non-governmental organization (NGO) for development aid. The NGO HAMAP-Humanitaire currently has projects in 14 countries.

=== The HALO Trust ===
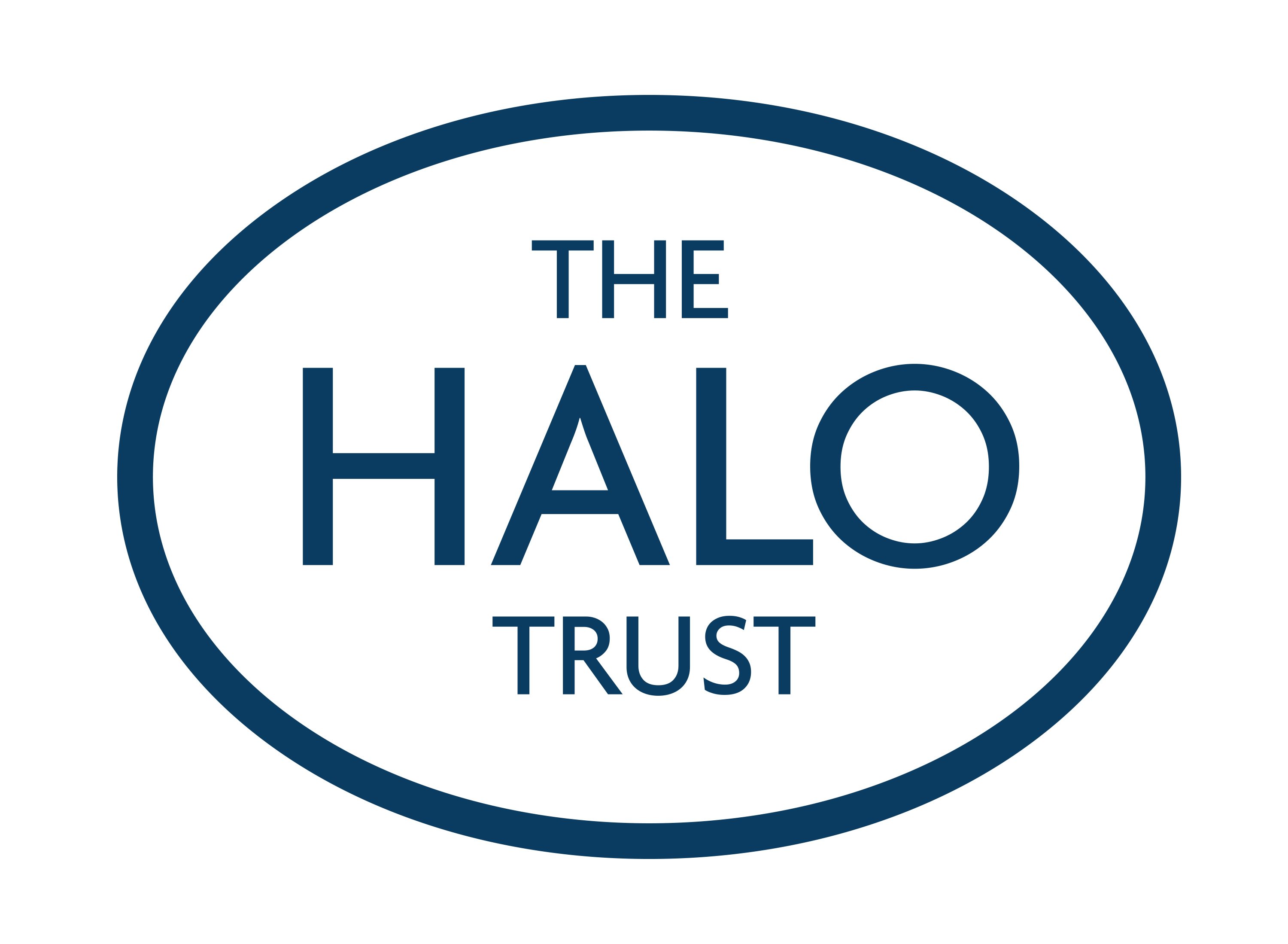

The Hazardous Area Life-Support Organization (HALO Trust) is a non-political, non-religious, non-governmental mine clearance organisation registered in Britain and the United States. Founded in 1988, it is the world's oldest international humanitarian demining NGO, and it is the largest with over 8,000 deminers and support staff operational in over 20 countries. By early 2006 HALO had cleared over 5,000,000 mines and UXO around the world. HALO's mission is to "protect lives and restore the livelihoods of those affected by conflict."

=== Humanity and Inclusion ===
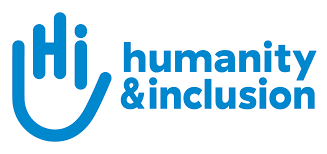
Humanity & Inclusion

Humanity and Inclusion (formerly Handicap International) is one of the 6 founding members of the International Campaign to Ban Landmines which received the Nobel Peace Prize in 1997. Humanity & Inclusion is involved in Mine Risk Education and demining projects in Afghanistan, Kosovo, Mozambique, Somalia, and beyond.

=== Horizon ===
Horizon Organisation for Post Conflict Environment Management (OPCEM) is an ex-servicemen's endeavour NGO (Charitable Trust) founded by senior retired Indian Army Officers in 2001. Horizon OPCEM is the first Indian NGO by, of and for Indian Ex Servicemen, dedicated to Post Conflict Environment Management with core competence in Humanitarian Demining. Founded by retired officers of the Indian Army in 2001, it was registered as a Society on 16 Jan 2002. Horizon OPCEM has done seven Humanitarian Demining Projects in Sri Lanka and has received funding from the Norwegian People's Aid.

=== INTERSOS ===
INTERSOS is an independent no-profit humanitarian organization committed to assist the victims of natural disasters and armed conflicts. It was founded in 1992 with the active support of Italian Trade Unions. INTERSOS has a flexible operational structure, with the central headquarters in Rome which is in charge of planning and coordination of operations, and various field offices in the countries of operation.

=== Japan Mine Action Service ===
Japan Mine Action Service (JMAS) is a Japanese nonprofit organization established in 2002 that is headed by a mine expert who retired from the Self-Defense Force. The JMAS is active mainly in Cambodia and Afghanistan.

=== Mine Awareness Trust ===
The Mines Awareness Trust (MAT) is a charitable organisation. Ben Remfrey formed the Trust in May 1999 as a direct response to the war in Kosovo.

=== Mines Advisory Group ===
The Mines Advisory Group (MAG) has operated since 1989. Having worked on a variety of conflict-related projects in around 35 countries, MAG was co-laureate of the 1997 Nobel Peace Prize, awarded for their work with the International Campaign to Ban Landmines. MAG has worked in over 40 countries since 1989 and currently has operations in Angola, Burundi, Cambodia, Chad, Democratic Republic of Congo, Honduras, Iraq, Lao P.D.R., Lebanon, Libya, Republic of Congo, Somalia, South Sudan, Sri Lanka, and Vietnam.

=== Mineseeker Operations and Mineseeker Foundation ===
The Mineseeker Foundation claims that it can locate mined areas more quickly and at a fraction of the cost of systems currently employed, using techniques that are significantly safer for the operators than most other methods. Initially the company will focus on identifying designated mined areas where there are, in fact, no mines, in order to release this land back to the community for agricultural or commercial development and rapidly reduce the overall scale of the clearance problem.

=== Menschen gegen Minen (MgM) ===
Menschen gegen Minen (People against Landmines) was founded on January 16, 1996, in Germany. The goal was to establish a humanitarian mine clearance organization which would offer its services to non-governmental organizations (NGOs) dedicated to re-establishing the infrastructure of dangerous regions in post war scenarios. Hendrik Ehlers and Hans Georg Kruessen founded MgM together with others in 1996. Today they are Managing Directors and active Managers of all demining operations at the same time. They have been working since 1992 in the field of humanitarian mine clearance and the destruction of dangerous ammunition in Southern Africa. They possess a wealth of practical experience through operations management, mined area survey, demining and the destruction of explosives (EOD).

=== No More Landmines ===
No More Landmines was a United Kingdom-based humanitarian landmine relief charity. The charity focused on landmine and unexploded ordnance removal, mine risk education programmes, and rehabilitation of survivors of landmine injuries. No More Landmines was established in May 2005 as the UK administrator of the United Nations Association Adopt-A-Minefield campaign, which has cleared over 21 million square metres (5,200 acres) of affected land since 1999. The trust ceased trading on 15 June 2009 and passed its assets on to the Mines Awareness Trust.

=== Norwegian People's Aid ===
Norwegian People's Aid (NPA) is one of Norway's largest non-governmental organisations, founded in 1939. NPA is involved in more than 400 projects in 30 countries. NPA has been involved in mine action since 1992. Cambodia was the first country where NPA started mine clearance and the organisation has grown considerably since then. NPA sits in the CC of the ICBL and the core group of LM and participates in different activities with SWG and SAC. As of December 2011, NPA was involved in mine action in sixteen countries in Africa, Asia, the Middle East, and Europe.

=== Response International ===
Response International is a UK registered charity established in 1993 to support victims of violent conflict. Over the last decade successful multi-sector programmes have been implemented in Angola, Bosnia, Chechnya, Kosovo, Lebanon and Pakistan. The objective of these programmes is to design and implement projects that offer immediate relief to victims of conflict and provide sustainable conditions to enable longer term development. Response International's projects have included landmine clearance and landmine awareness and victim rehabilitation.

=== Saint Barbara Foundation ===
Stiftung Sankt Barbara Deutschland - Saint Barbara Foundation (SBF) is a humanitarian foundation registered in Germany. Since 1995 SBF clears landmines and ERW and supports different projects in rehabilitation and assistance for mine victims. Former countries of engagement were Angola, Sudan, Ethiopia and Somaliland, actually SBF is working in Libya. SBF's projects include landmine clearance, landmine awareness and victim rehabilitation.

=== Ukrainian Deminers Association ===
The Ukrainian Deminers Association is a Ukrainian non-profit organization founded in 2018 by Tymur Pistriuha and a group of specialists with the aim of contributing to the development of the mine action system in Ukraine. It is a certified mine action operator and carries out humanitarian demining activities, including non-technical survey, technical survey, clearance, and explosive ordnance disposal.

== Military ==
Military mine clearance agencies focus on the process undertaken by soldiers to clear a safe path so they can advance during conflict. The military process of mine clearance only clears mines that block strategic pathways required in the advance or retreat of soldiers at war. The military term used for mine clearance is breaching. This process accepts that limited casualties may occur.

== Area cleared ==
The survey teams of MCPA have identified, marked and mapped more than 280 million square metres (110 square miles) of mine contaminated area and about 199 million square metres (77 square miles) of former battle area contaminated by UXO.

== See also ==
- Cluster bomb
- Improvised explosive device
- Unexploded ordnance
