= Feilitzschstraße =

Street in Schwabing, Germany

The Feilitzschstraße is a roughly 450-meter-long street in Munich's Schwabing district. After the incorporation of Schwabing to Munich in 1891, it was renamed after the Bavarian State Interior Minister, Maximilian von Feilitzsch (1834–1913) in order to avoid confusion with the Maffeistraße in the old town.

== Route ==
The Feilitzschstraße leads from the Münchner Freiheit and the Leopoldstraße (with partial construction dating back to the 18th century) past the old Schwabinger village square, known today as the Wedekindplatz, running in the east to the Englischer Garten and is occupied by cinemas, cocktail bars, pubs, restaurants, and boutiques.

At Feilitzschstraße 6, is the film company Constantin Film. In a back courtyard of the Feilitzschstraße 7, was the "Schwabinger 7", which existed since the post-war period of the 1950s to 2012. Since the demolition of the building, which was accompanied by supraregional protests, the Kultkneipe is located in Feilitzschstraße 15.

On 3 June 1967, accompanied by a street festival, the cornerstone of Hacklwirt in Feilitzschstraße 12 became a Drugstore, which was the beginning of the transformation of a Bohème district into a pop and hippie meeting place. The "giant salon with many mirrors, pop arabesques and protest posters" and daily 2,000 guests, including Mick Jagger or Romy Schneider, was well known in the region. While the bistro on the ground floor remained unchanged, the disco on the first floor was converted in 1987 into a Theater bar. For the first time, the revue theater "Bel Etage" was performed there for twenty years, and from 2007 to November 2009 it was the location of the Kammertheater Schwabing. Heppel & Ettlich has played there since then. The Galerie Roucka, founded by the photographer Wolfgang Roucka in number 14, celebrated its 50th anniversary in 2014.

At the corner of Feilitzschstraße / Werneckstraße, from 1715 to 1718, was the castle Suresnes, also called Werneckschlößl, built by Johann Baptist Gunetzrhainer. Since 1967 it has been the meeting place of the Catholic Academy in Bavaria. The seminar rooms are also located in Viereckhof, a farmers' settlement in Feilitzschstraße 26 (built at the end of the 13th century and reworked in baroque style in 1787). Opposite the Viereckhof there existed, until 1892, a second large Schwabing farm, which was called "Saubauernhof" because of its large pig farm. The neo-renaissance corner building in Feilitzschstraße 25, originally built there by Anton Mack, was originally decorated by sculptures of Johann Wolfgang von Goethe, Friedrich Schiller and Heinrich Heine, designed by the sculptor Wilhelm Kielhorn above the windows on the second floor. At the beginning of the Second World War, a SA-man who was living on the fourth floor of the house had the sculpture of Heine removed. The two putti flankings around him with writing and book remained. The free space was replaced by "1892", the "2" being an upside down "5".

At the corner of Feilitzschstraße to the Leopoldstraße, Johann Theodor von Waldkirch acquired a pleasure house with a garden in the 18th century, which was declared on 22 January 1774, by Elector Max III. Joseph, to the venerable royal seat of Mitter-Schwäbing. Later it was acquired by the philosopher Franz Xaver von Baader, after whom it was renamed Baaderschlösschen. In 1874 Ludwig Petuel bought the manor house and established it as a restaurant for the nearby Schwabinger brewery. In 1889, the castle was demolished and replaced by a new building with a large hall. There, legendary artists' festivals of the Bohème took place, Such as the "Schwabinger Bauernkirta" organized by the Akademie der Bildende Künste, or the most famous artist and student festival of the Munich Fasching. After the First World War, the "Schwabylon Fest" was created and held there. After the Second World War the partially destroyed building was renovated. In 1964 a black, approximately 50 m high, eleven-storey warehouse was built there by Hertie, it was later demolished in 1992.

2014/2015 the Feilitzschstraße and the Wedekindplatz were redesigned for 1.8 million euros. The "Schwabinger lantern" was also put up again on Feilitzschstraße in memory of the Schwabinger Gisela as part of the redesign.

== Historical buildings ==
The Feilitzschstraße belongs to the protected building complex Altschwabing (E-1-62-000-4). In total, the Feilitzschstraße has more than 18 monuments protected by the Bavarian State Office for Monument Protection.

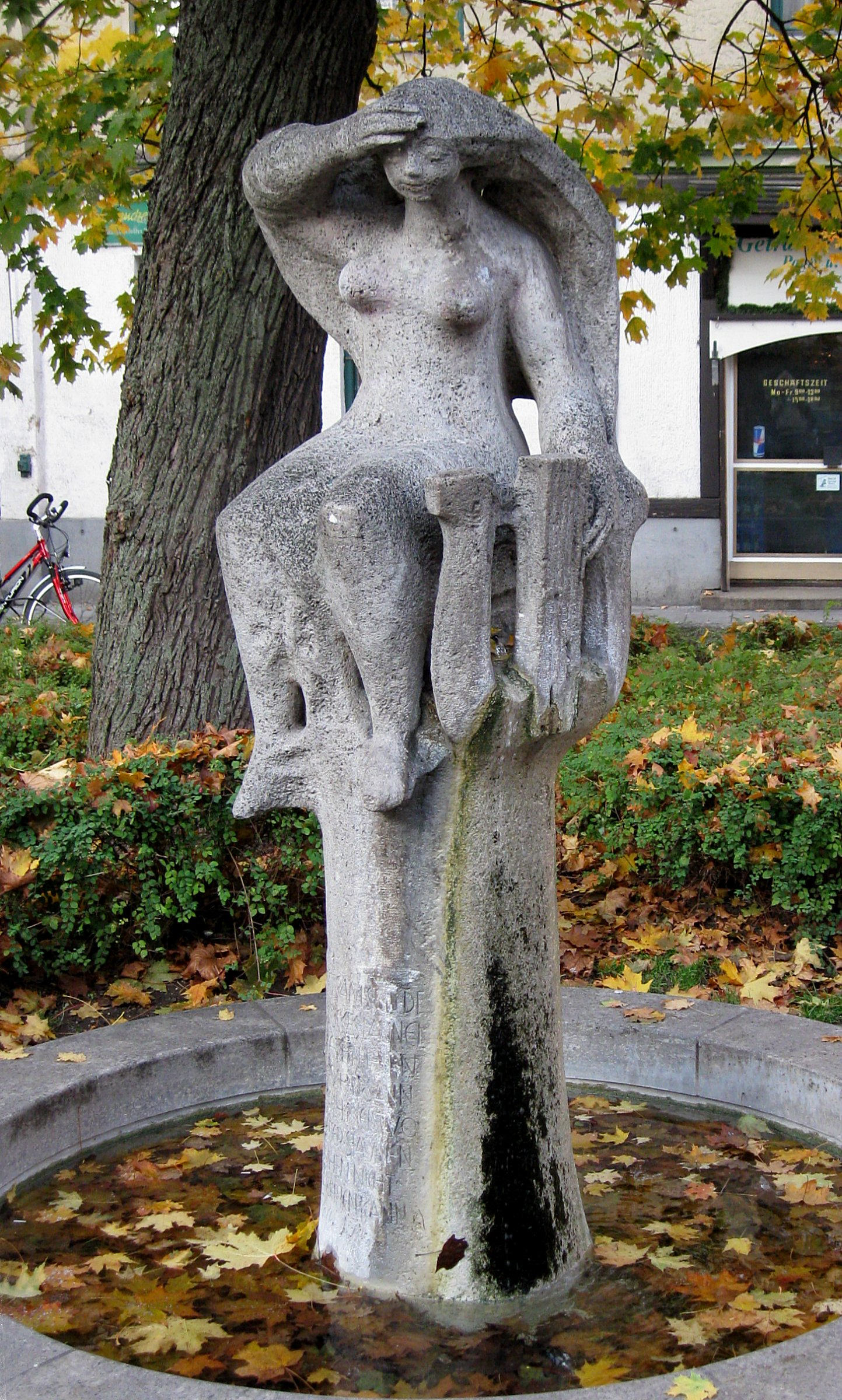
erected on 10 July 1959, fountain designed by Ferdinand Filler

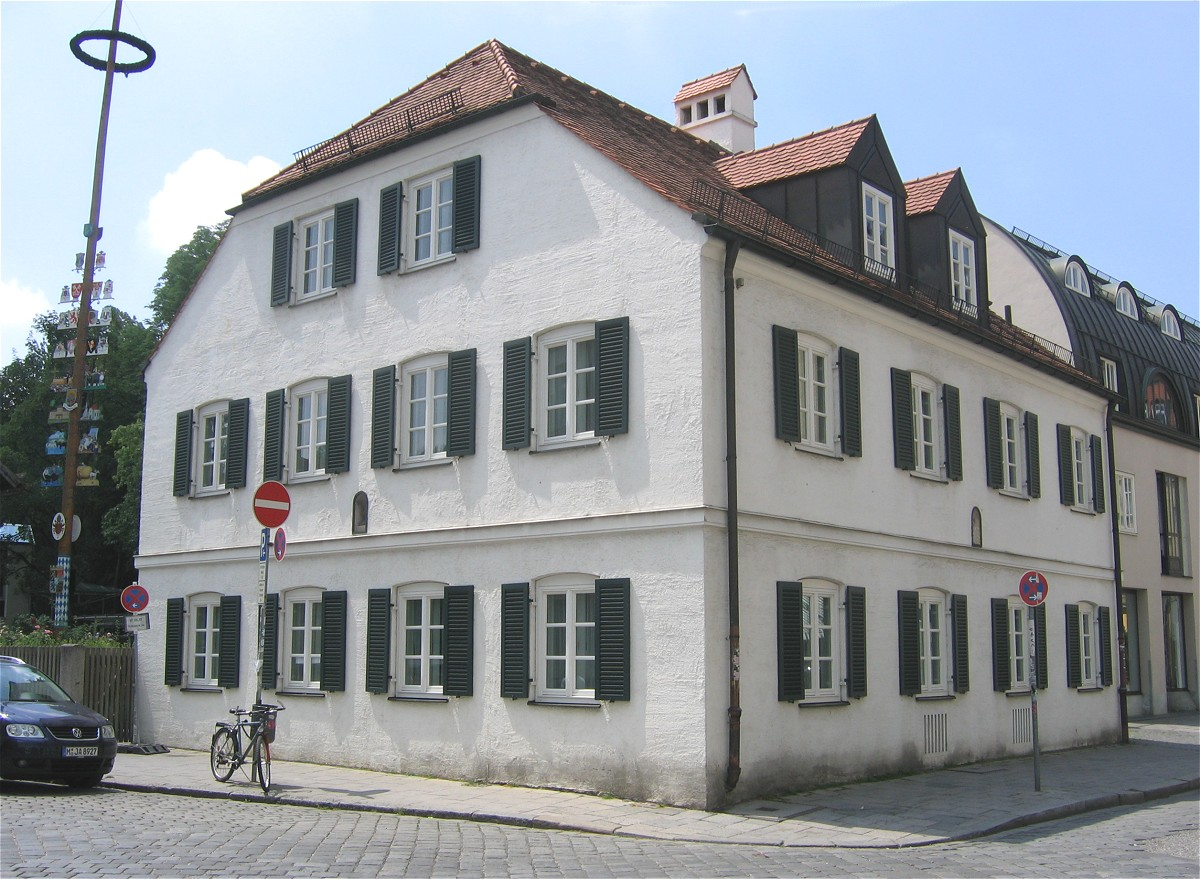
Altschwabinger farmstead "Viereckhof" from the end of the 13th century, reworked in 1787 in barock style, on Feilitzschstraße 26

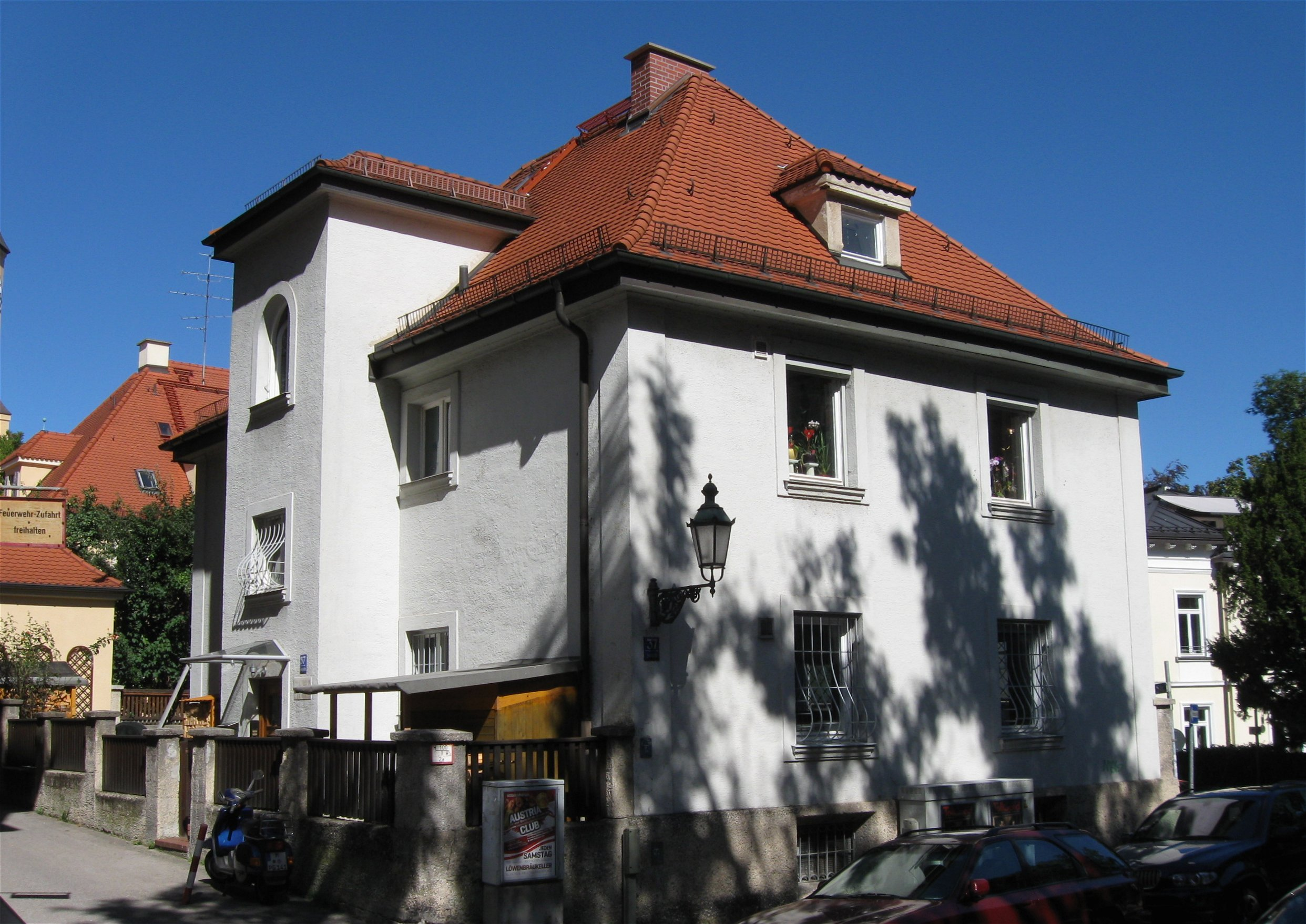
1928, Franz Xaver Boemmel built baroque glazing in the Feilitzschstraße 37

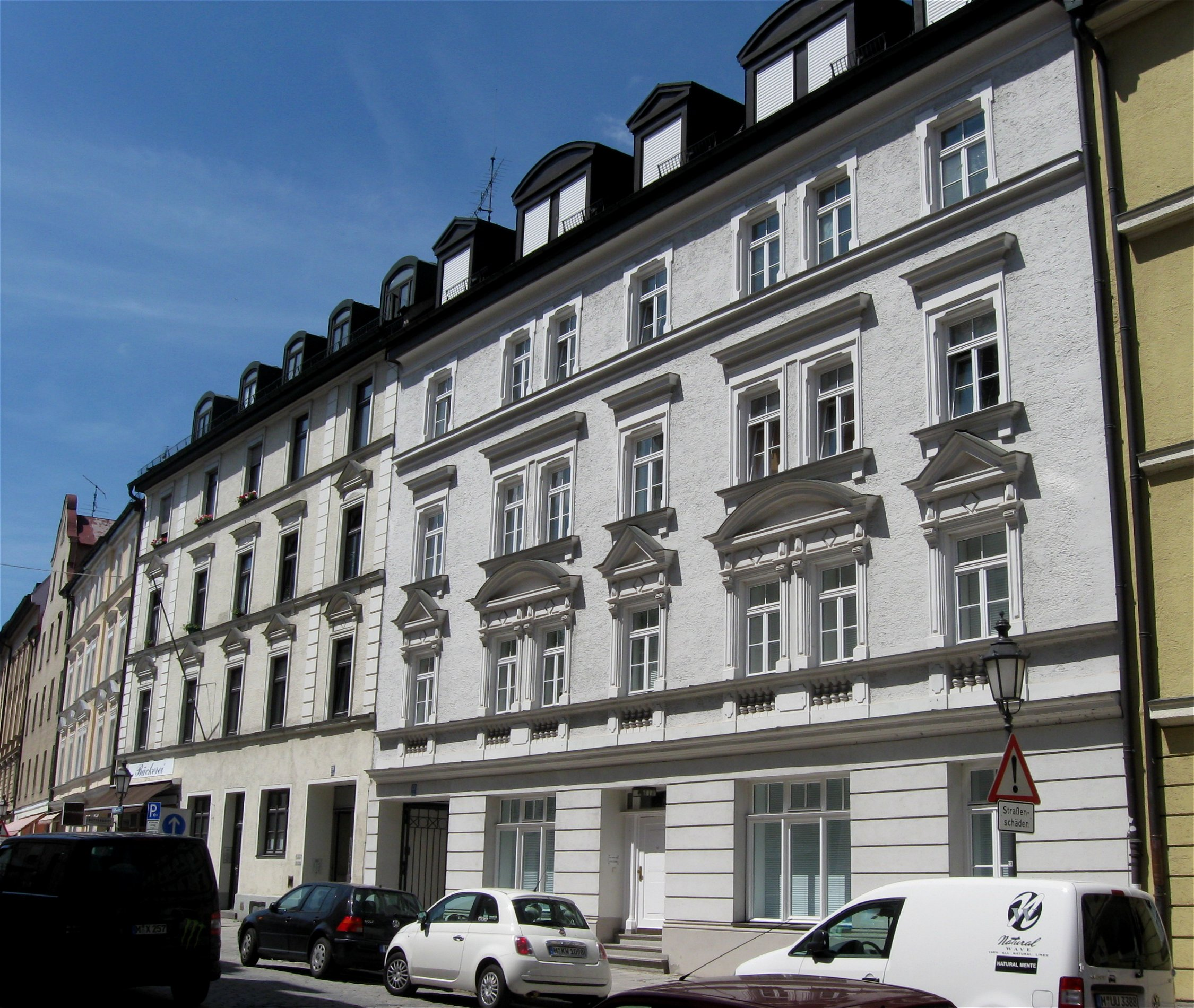
Neo – Renaissance building from the end of the 19th century in Feilitzschstraße 33

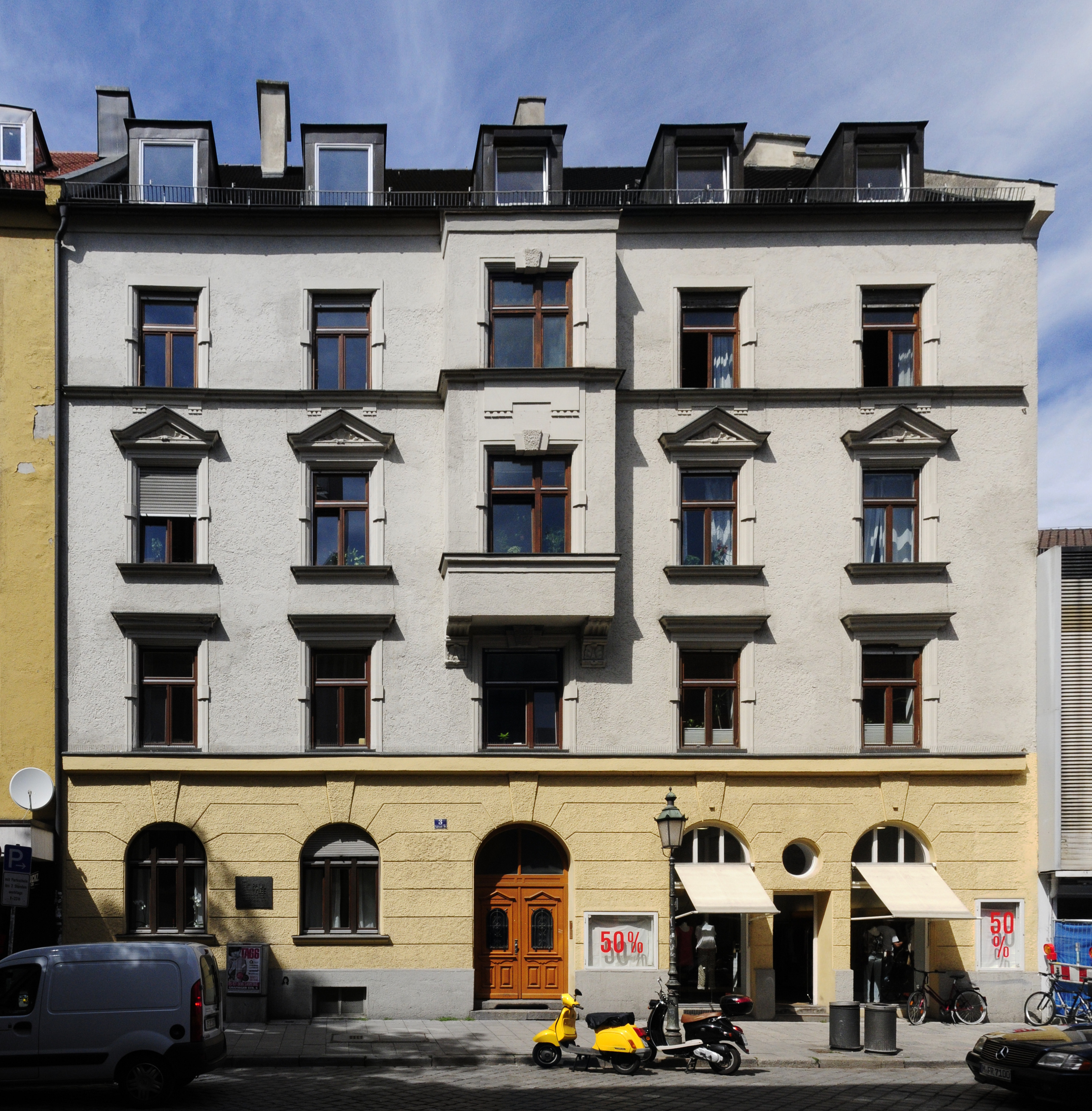
Building constructed around 1900 in the style of the German Renaissance in Feilitzschstraße 3, where Paul Klee had his studio for eleven years

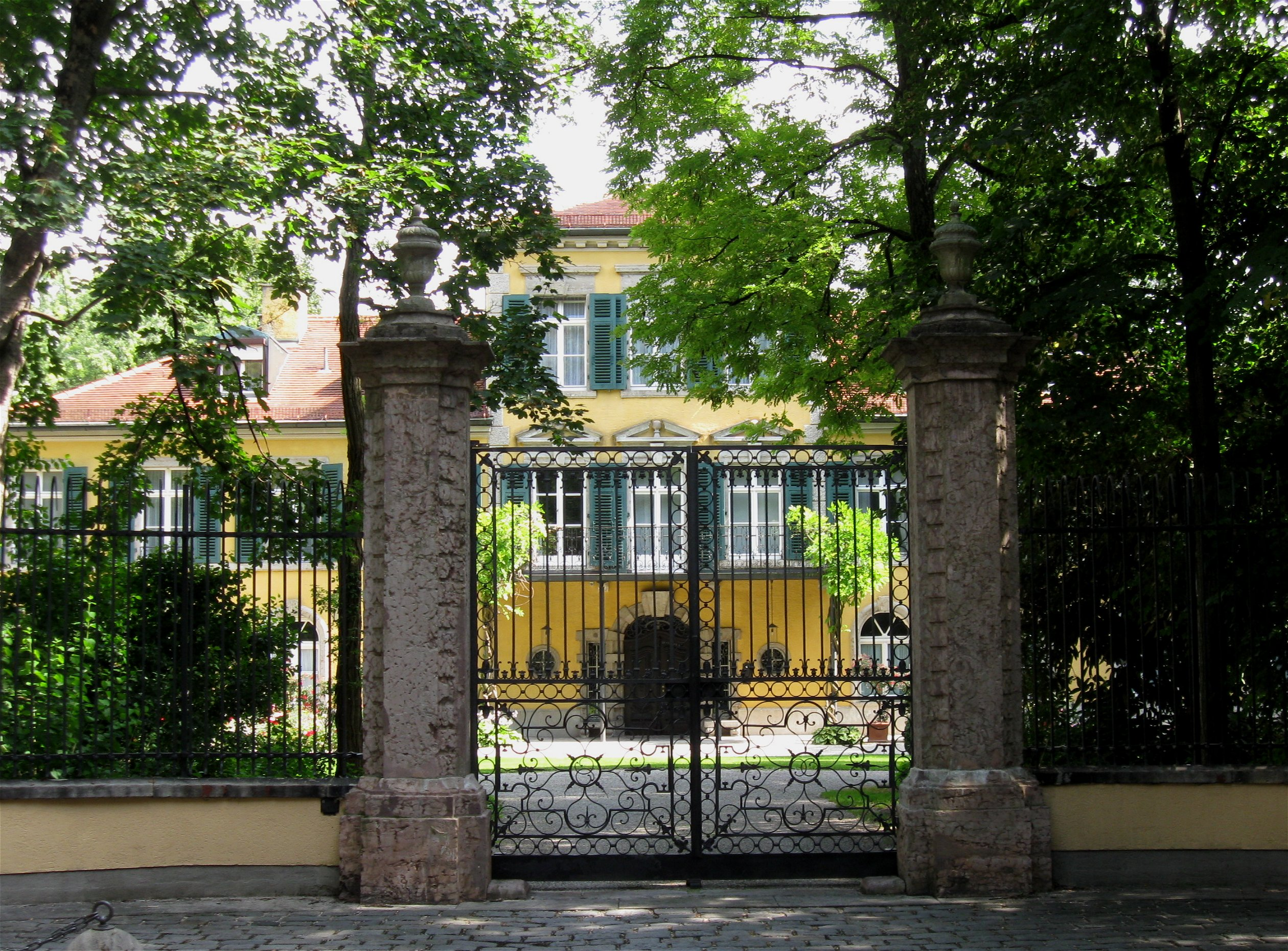
Suresnes Castle, since 1967 the meeting house of the Catholic Academy in Bavaria

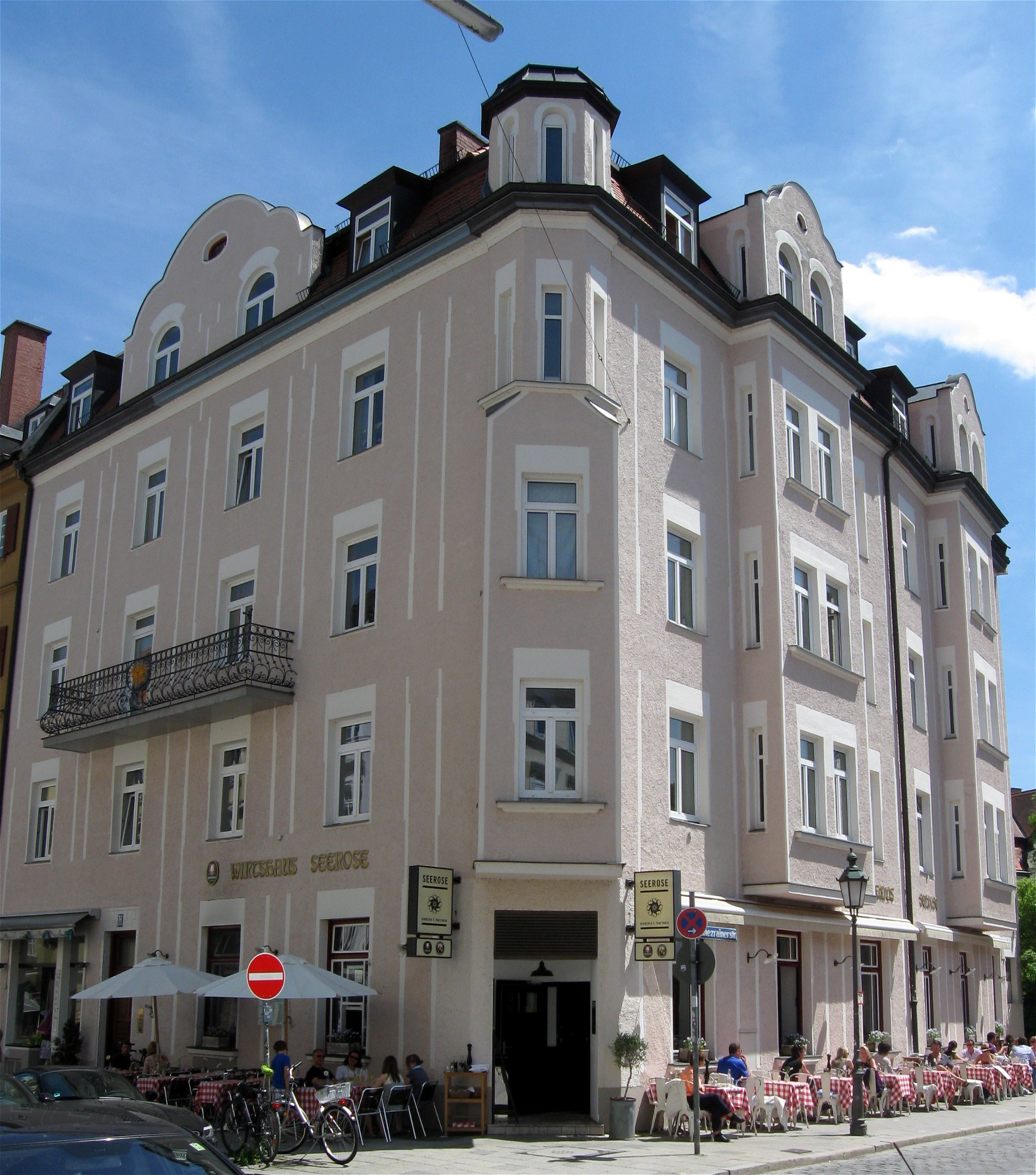
Gasthaus zur Seerose, where the editorship of the Simplicissimus was located as well as where Thomas Mann lived. In 1948 the seerose circle was founded, which annually awards the Seerosen prize.

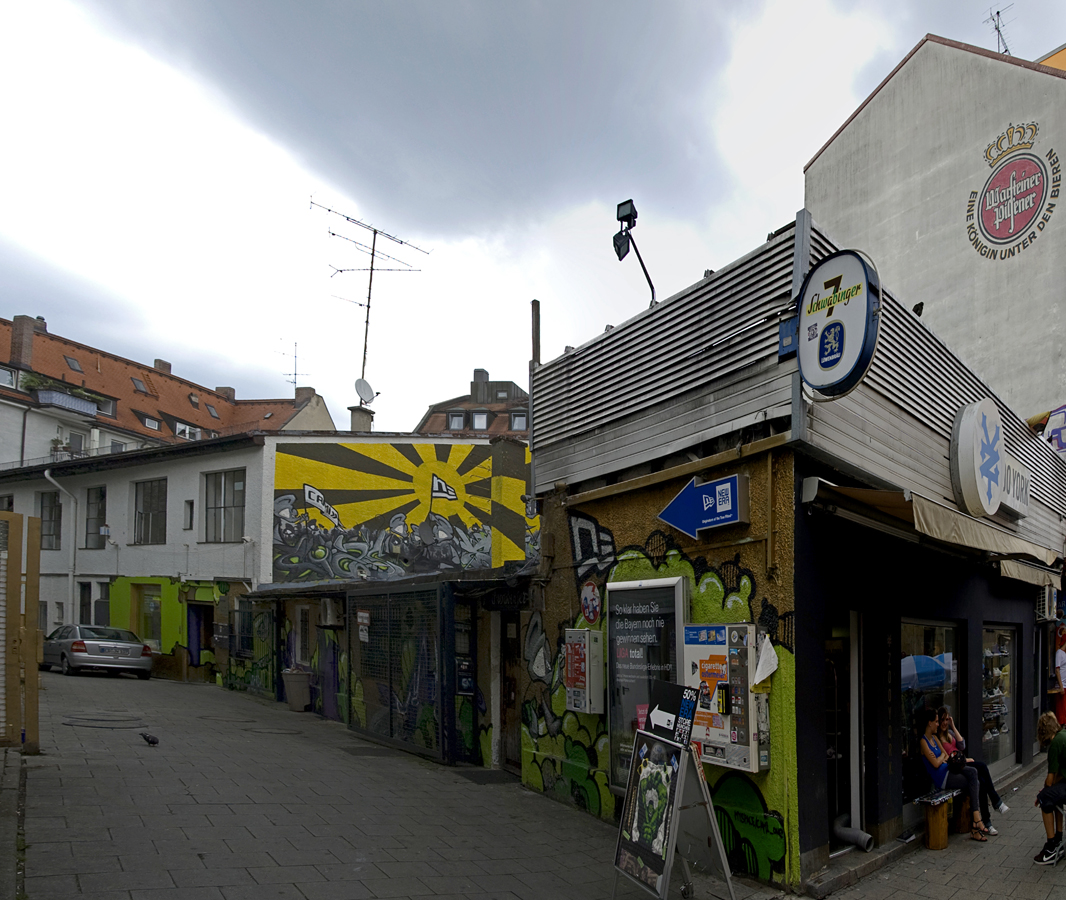
The original Schwabinger 7, as it existed until 2012

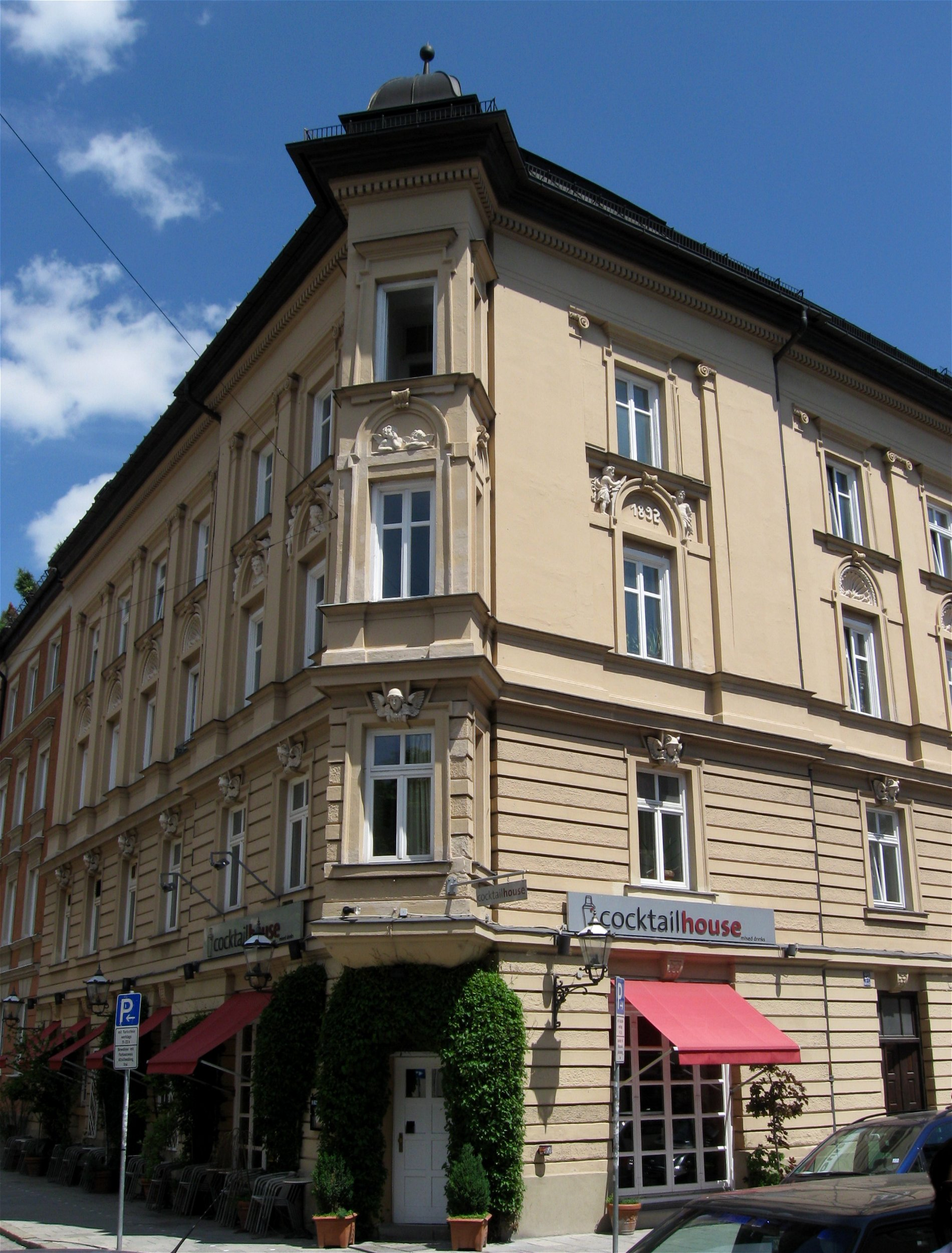
This neo-renaissance corner building, built in 1892, was originally the location of the sculpture of Heine, which was replaced by a year with and upside down "5".

== Famous residents ==
Thomas Mann lived in the third floor of Feilitzschstraße 32 (then No. 5, since 1909 Gaststätte Seerose), and where he wrote his novel Buddenbrooks, for which he was awarded the Nobel Prize in Literature in 1929. In the same building was also the editorial office of the satirical weekly newspaper Simplicissimus. In 1948, the Seerose circle was founded as club for artists of all disciplines. "Founding fathers", where among others, the actor Gustl Weigert (who lived in the neighboring house No. 34 from 1944), the poet Peter Paul Althaus and the painter Hermann Geiseler. Until 2004, Ernst Günther Bleisch was "Oberseerosianer". Since then, literary scientist, author and painter Brigitta Rambeck has been leading the literary Seerosen circle, seconded by Barbara Bronnen, Gert Heidenreich, Dagmar Nick, Maria Peschek, Anatol Regnier, Asta Scheib, Albert von Schirnding, Michael Skasa and Winfried Zehetmeier. After 25 years, Baldur Geipel handed over the chairmanship of the Seerosen Circle of Visual Arts to the painter and graphic artist Konrad Hetz.

A memorial plaque in Feilitzschstraße 3 created by the Munich sculptor Eugen Weiss, remembers Paul Klee, who had his studio there from 1908 to 1919. During the period between July and October 1904, Oskar Panizza spent his time on the second floor of Feilitzschstraße 19. From January 1936, Stefan Andres lived with his family in Feilitzschstraße 34. Peter Pasetti also lived in the same house and Nastassja Kinski also lived temporarily in Feilitzschstraße.

== Unexploded bomb ==
On 28 August 2012, an unexploded American bomb, dating from the Second World War, was discovered at a construction site on Feilitzschstraße. The 250 kg bomb was found by workers on the site of the former Schwabinger pub.

After examining the bomb's condition, bomb disposal experts concluded that the safest way of dealing with it was to conduct a controlled explosion. The detonation caused significant damage to nearby buildings - 17 houses were so badly damaged that their inhabitants needed new accommodation.
