= Metal detector =

Electronic instrument which detects the presence of metal nearby

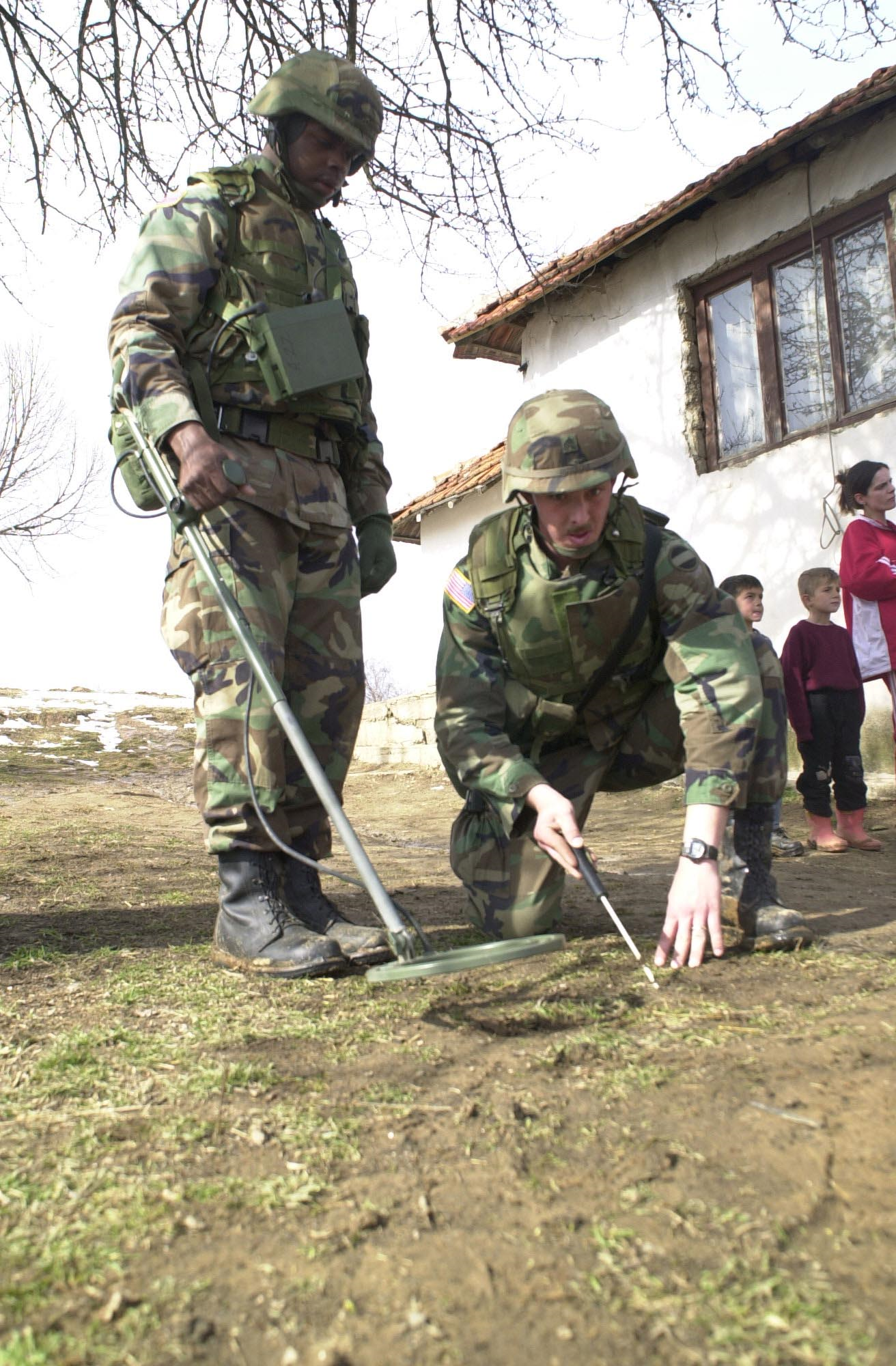
U.S. Army soldiers use a military standard metal detector

A metal detector is an instrument that detects the nearby presence of metal. Metal detectors are useful for finding metal objects on the surface, underground, and under water. A metal detector typically consists of a control box, an adjustable shaft, and a variable-shaped pickup coil. When the coil nears metal, the control box signals its presence with a tone, numerical reading, light, or needle movement. Signal intensity typically increases with proximity or metal size and composition. A common type are stationary "walk through" metal detectors used at access points in prisons, courthouses, airports and psychiatric hospitals to detect concealed metal weapons on a person's body.

The simplest form of a metal detector consists of an oscillator producing an alternating current that passes through a coil producing an alternating magnetic field. If a piece of electrically conductive metal is close to the coil, eddy currents will be induced (inductive sensor) in the metal, and this produces a magnetic field of its own. If another coil is used to measure the magnetic field (acting as a magnetometer), the change in the magnetic field due to the metallic object can be detected.

The first industrial metal detectors came out in the 1960s, and were used for finding minerals, among other things. Metal detectors help find land mines. They also detect weapons like knives and guns, which is important for airport security. People most commonly use them to search for buried objects, like in archaeology and treasure hunting. Metal detectors are also used to detect foreign bodies in food, and in the construction industry to detect steel reinforcing bars in concrete and pipes and wires buried in walls and floors.

== History and development ==
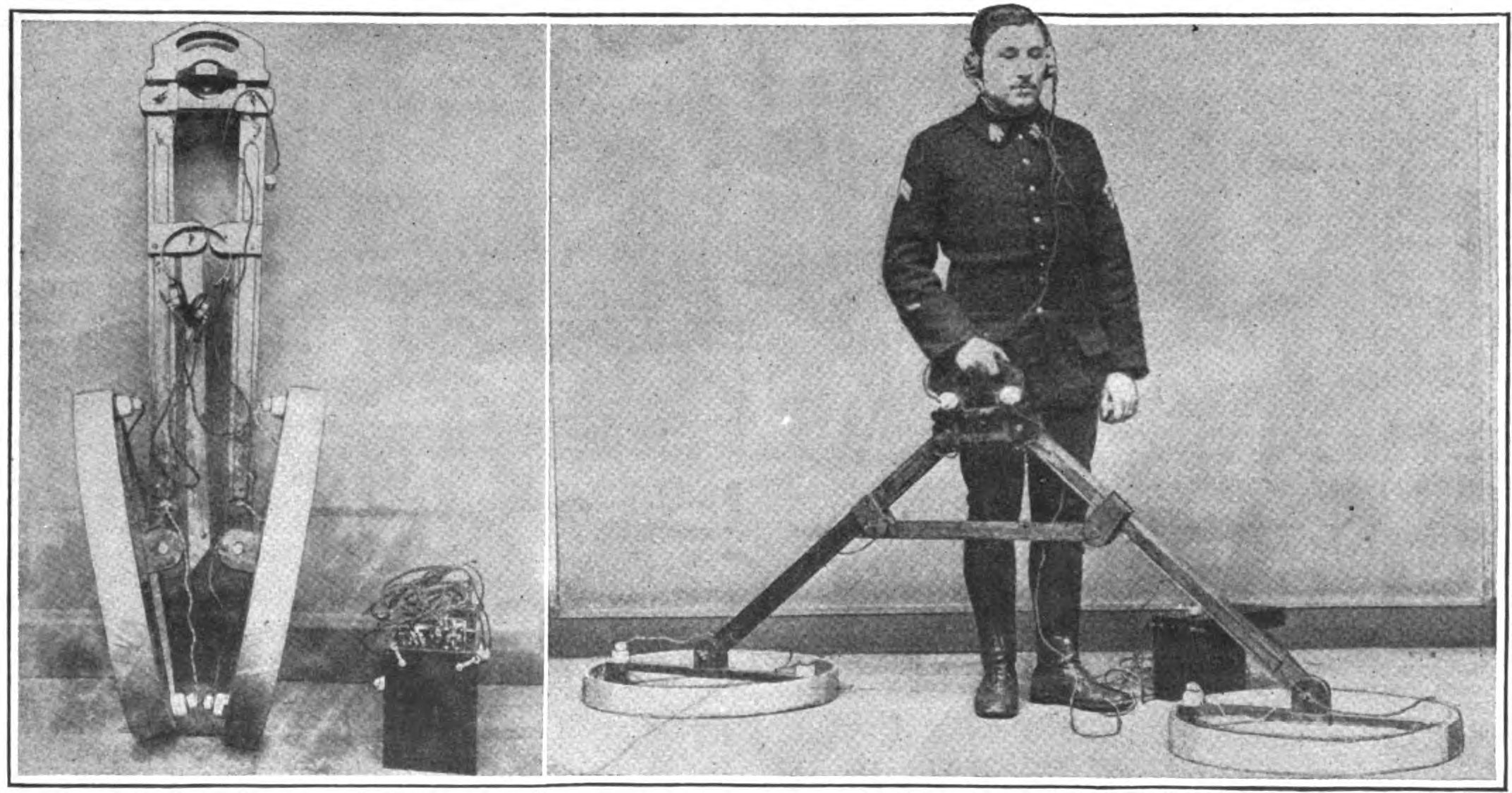
An early metal detector, in 1919, used to find un-exploded bombs in France after World War I

=== First idea ===
The first metal detector was likely the simple electric conduction metal detector ca. 1830. Electric conduction was also used to locate metal ore bodies by measuring the conductivity between metal rods driven into the ground.

In 1841, Professor Heinrich Wilhelm Dove published an invention he called the "differential inductor". It was a 4-coil induction balance, with 2 glass tubes each having 2 well-insulated copper wire solenoids wound around them. Charged Leyden jars (high-voltage capacitors) were discharged through the 2 primary coils; this current surge induced a voltage in the secondary coils. When the secondary coils were wired in opposition, the induced voltages cancelled as confirmed by the Professor holding the ends of the secondary coils. When a piece of metal was placed inside one glass tube the Professor received a shock. This then was the first magnetic induction metal detector, and the first pulse induction metal detector.

In 1862, Italian General Giuseppe Garibaldi was shot and wounded in the foot. It was difficult to distinguish between bullet, bone, and cartilage. So Professor Favre of Marseilles quickly built a simple probe that was inserted into the track of the bullet. It had two sharp points connected to a battery and a bell. Contact with metal completed the circuit and rang the bell. In 1867, Mr. Sylvan de Wilde had a similar detector and an extractor also wired to a bell. In 1870, Gustave Trouvé, a French electrical engineer also had a similar device however his buzzer made a different sound for lead and iron. The electric bullet locators were in use until the advent of X-rays.

In late 1878 and early 1879, Professor (of music) David Edward Hughes published his experiments with the 4-coil induction balance. He used his own recent invention the microphone and a ticking clock to generate regular pulses and a telephone receiver as detector. To measure the strength of the signals he invented a coaxial 3-coil induction balance which he called the "electric sonometer". Hughes did much to popularize the induction balance, quickly leading to practical devices that could identify counterfeit coins. In 1880 Mr. J. Munro, C.E. suggested the use of the 4-coil induction balance for metal prospecting. Hughes's coaxial 3-coil induction balance would also see use in metal detecting.

In July 1881, Alexander Graham Bell initially used a 4-coil induction balance to attempt to locate a bullet lodged in the chest of American President James Garfield. After much experimenting the best bullet detection range he achieved was only 2 inches (5 centimeters). He then used his own earlier discovery, the partially overlapping 2-coil induction balance, and the detection range increased to 5 inches (12 centimeters). But the attempt was still unsuccessful because the metal coil spring bed Garfield was lying on confused the detector. Bell's 2-coil induction balance would go on to evolve into the popular double D coil.

On December 16, 1881, Captain Charles Ambrose McEvoy applied for British Patent No. 5518, Apparatus for Searching for Submerged Torpedoes, &c., which was granted Jun 16 1882. His US269439 patent application of Jul 12 1882 was granted Dec 19 1882. It was a 4-coil induction balance for detecting submerged metallic torpedoes and iron ships and the like. Given the development time involved this may have been the earliest known device specifically constructed as a metal detector using magnetic induction.

In 1892, George M. Hopkins described an orthogonal 2-coil induction balance for metal detecting.

In 1915, Professor Camille Gutton developed a 4-coil induction balance to detect unexploded shells in farmland of former battlefields in France. Unusually both coil pairs were used for detection. The 1919 photo at the right is a later version of Gutton's detector.

=== Modern developments ===
The modern development of the metal detector began in the 1920s. Gerhard Fischer had developed a system of radio direction-finding, which was to be used for accurate navigation. The system worked extremely well, but Fischer noticed there were anomalies in areas where the terrain contained ore-bearing rocks. He reasoned that if a radio beam could be distorted by metal, then it should be possible to design a machine which would detect metal using a search coil resonating at a radio frequency. In 1925 he applied for, and was granted, the first patent for an electronic metal detector. Although Gerhard Fischer was the first person granted a patent for an electronic metal detector, the first to apply was Shirl Herr, a businessman from Crawfordsville, Indiana. His application for a hand-held Hidden-Metal Detector was filed in February 1924, but not patented until July 1928. Herr assisted Italian leader Benito Mussolini in recovering items remaining from the Emperor Caligula's galleys at the bottom of Lake Nemi, Italy, in August 1929. Herr's invention was used by Admiral Richard Byrd's Second Antarctic Expedition in 1933, when it was used to locate objects left behind by earlier explorers. It was effective up to a depth of eight feet. However, it was one Lieutenant Józef Stanisław Kosacki, a Polish officer attached to a unit stationed in St Andrews, Scotland, during the early years of World War II, who refined the design into a practical Polish mine detector. These units were still quite heavy, as they ran on vacuum tubes, and needed separate battery packs.

The design invented by Kosacki was used extensively during the Second Battle of El Alamein when 500 units were shipped to Field Marshal Montgomery to clear the minefields of the retreating Germans, and later used during the Allied invasion of Sicily, the Allied invasion of Italy and the Invasion of Normandy.

As the creation and refinement of the device was a wartime military research operation, the knowledge that Kosacki created the first practical metal detector was kept secret for over 50 years.

=== Beat frequency induction ===
Many manufacturers of these new devices brought their own ideas to the market. White's Electronics of Oregon began in the 1950s by building a machine called the Oremaster Geiger Counter. Another leader in detector technology was Charles Garrett, who pioneered the BFO (beat frequency oscillator) machine. With the invention and development of the transistor in the 1950s and 1960s, metal detector manufacturers and designers made smaller, lighter machines with improved circuitry, running on small battery packs. Companies sprang up all over the United States and Britain to supply the growing demand. Beat Frequency Induction requires movement of the detector coil; akin to how swinging a conductor near a magnet induces an electric current.

=== Refinements ===
Modern top models are fully computerized, using integrated circuit technology to allow the user to set sensitivity, discrimination, track speed, threshold volume, notch filters, etc., and hold these parameters in memory for future use. Compared to just a decade ago, detectors are lighter, deeper-seeking, use less battery power, and discriminate better.

State-of-the-art metal detectors have further incorporated extensive wireless technologies for the earphones, connect to Wi-Fi networks and Bluetooth devices. Some also utilize built in GPS locator technology to keep track of searching location and the location of items found. Some connect to smartphone applications to further extend functionality.

=== Discriminators ===
The biggest technical change in detectors was the development of a tunable induction system. This system involved two coils that are electro-magnetically tuned. One coil acts as an RF transmitter, the other as a receiver; in some cases these can be tuned to between 3 and 100 kHz. When metal is in their vicinity, a signal is detected owing to eddy currents induced in the metal. What allowed detectors to discriminate between metals was that every metal has a different phase response when exposed to alternating current: longer waves (low frequency) penetrate deeper into the ground, and select for high-conductivity targets like silver and copper; shorter waves (higher frequency) are less ground-penetrating, and select for low-conductivity targets like iron. Unfortunately, high frequency is also sensitive to ground mineralization interference. This selectivity or discrimination allowed detectors to be developed that could selectively detect desirable metals, while ignoring undesirable ones.

Even with discriminators, it was still a challenge to avoid undesirable metals, because some of them have similar phase responses (e.g. tinfoil and gold), particularly in alloy form. Thus, improperly tuning out certain metals increased the risk of passing over a valuable find. Another disadvantage of discriminators was that they reduced the sensitivity of the machines.

=== New coil designs ===
Coil designers also tried out innovative designs. The original induction balance coil system consisted of two identical coils placed on top of one another. Compass Electronics produced a new design: two coils in a D shape, mounted back-to-back to form a circle. The system was widely used in the 1970s, and both concentric and double D type (or widescan as they became known) had their fans. Another development was the invention of detectors which could cancel out the effect of mineralization in the ground. This gave greater depth, but was a non-discriminate mode. It worked best at lower frequencies than those used before, and frequencies of 3 to 20 kHz were found to produce the best results. Many detectors in the 1970s had a switch which enabled the user to switch between the discriminate mode and the non-discriminate mode. Later developments switched electronically between both modes. The development of the induction balance detector would ultimately result in the motion detector, which constantly checked and balanced the background mineralization.

=== Pulse induction ===
At the same time, developers were looking at using a different technique in metal detection called pulse induction. Unlike the beat frequency oscillator or the induction balance machines, which both used a uniform alternating current at a low frequency, the pulse induction (PI) machine simply magnetized the ground with a relatively powerful, momentary current through a search coil. In the absence of metal, the field decayed at a uniform rate, and the time it took to fall to zero volts could be accurately measured. However, if metal was present when the machine fired, a small eddy current would be induced in the metal, and the time for sensed current decay would be increased. These time differences were minute, but the improvement in electronics made it possible to measure them accurately and identify the presence of metal at a reasonable distance. These new machines had one major advantage: they were mostly impervious to the effects of mineralization, and rings and other jewelry could now be located even under highly mineralized black sand. The addition of computer control and digital signal processing have further improved pulse induction sensors.

One particular advantage of using a pulse induction detector includes the ability to ignore the minerals contained within heavily mineralized soil; in some cases the heavy mineral content may even help the PI detector function better. Where a VLF detector is affected negatively by soil mineralization, a PI unit is not.

== Uses ==
Large portable metal detectors are used by archaeologists and treasure hunters to locate metallic items, such as jewelry, coins, clothes buttons and other accessories, bullets, and other various artifacts buried beneath the surface.

=== Archaeology ===
Metal detectors are widely used in archaeology with the first recorded use by military historian Don Rickey in 1958 who used one to detect the firing lines at Little Big Horn. However archaeologists oppose the use of metal detectors by "artifact seekers" or "site looters" whose activities disrupt archaeological sites. The problem with use of metal detectors in archaeological sites or hobbyist who find objects of archeological interest is that the context that the object was found in is lost and no detailed survey of its surroundings is made. Outside of known sites the significance of objects may not be apparent to a metal detector hobbyist.

==== England and Wales ====
In England and Wales, metal detecting is legal provided that the landowner has granted permission and that the area is not a Scheduled Ancient Monument, a site of special scientific interest (SSSI), or covered by elements of the Countryside Stewardship Scheme.

The Treasure Act 1996 governs whether or not items that have been discovered are defined as treasure. Finders of items that the Act defines as treasure must report their finds to the local coroner. If they discover items which are not defined as treasure but that are of cultural or historical interest, finders can voluntarily report them to the Portable Antiquities Scheme and the UK Detector Finds Database.

==== France ====
The sale of metal detectors is allowed in France. The first use of metal detectors in France which led to archaeological discoveries occurred in 1958: people living in the city of Graincourt-lès-Havrincourt who were seeking copper from World War I bombshell with military mine detector found a Roman silver treasure. The French law on metal detecting is ambiguous because it refers only to the objective pursued by the user of a metal detector. The first law to regulate the use of metal detectors was Law No. 89–900 of 18 December 1989. This last is resumed without any change in Article L. 542–1 of the code of the heritage, which states that "no person may use the equipment for the detection of metal objects, for the purpose of research monuments and items of interest prehistory, history, art and archeology without having previously obtained an administrative authorization issued based on the applicant's qualification and the nature and method of research."

Outside the research of archaeological objects, using a metal detector does not require specific authorization, except that of the owner of the land. Asked about Law No. 89–900 of 18 December 1989 by a member of parliament, Jack Lang, Minister of Culture at the time, replied by letter the following: "The new law does not prohibit the use of metal detectors but only regulates the use. If the purpose of such use is the search for archaeological remains, prior authorization is required from my services. Apart from this case, the law ask to be reported to the appropriate authorities an accidental discovery of archaeological remains." The entire letter of Jack Lang was published in 1990 in a French metal detection magazine, and then, to be visible on the internet, scanned with permission of the author of the magazine on a French metal detection website.

==== Northern Ireland ====
In Northern Ireland, it is an offence to be in possession of a metal detector on a scheduled or a state care site without a licence from the Department for Communities. It is also illegal to remove an archaeological object found with a detector from such a site without written consent.

==== Republic of Ireland ====
In the Republic of Ireland, laws against metal detecting are very strict: it is illegal to use a detection device to search for archaeological objects anywhere within the state or its territorial seas without the prior written consent of the Minister for Culture, Heritage and the Gaeltacht, and it is illegal to promote the sale or use of detection devices for the purposes of searching for archaeological objects.

==== Scotland ====
Under the Scots law principle of bona vacantia, the Crown has claim over any object of any material value where the original owner cannot be traced. There is also no 300 year limit to Scottish finds. Any artifact found, whether by metal detector survey or from an archaeological excavation, must be reported to the Crown through the Treasure Trove Advisory Panel at the National Museums of Scotland. The panel then determines what will happen to the artifacts. Reporting is not voluntary, and failure to report the discovery of historic artifacts is a criminal offence in Scotland.

==== United States ====
The sale of metal detectors is allowed in the United States. People can use metal detectors in public places (parks, beaches, etc.) and on private property with the permission of the owner of the site. In the United States, cooperation between archeologists hunting for the location of colonial-era Native American villages and hobbyists has been productive.

=== As a hobby ===
A man metal detecting on a beach in Japan, 2016

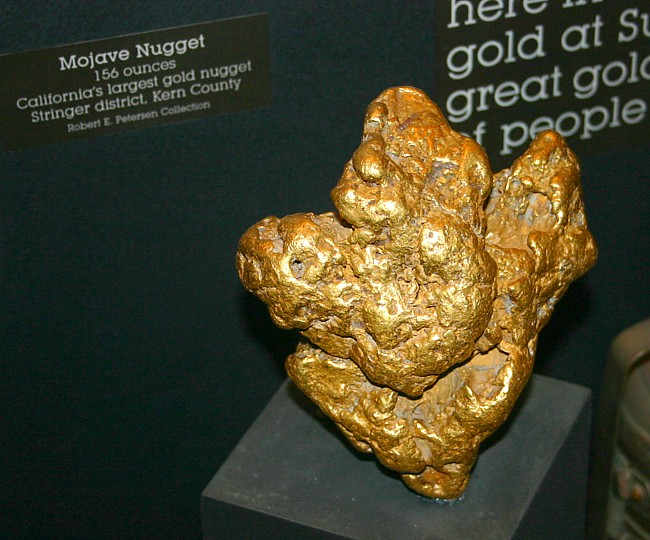
This 156-troy-ounce (4.9 kg) gold nugget, known as the Mojave Nugget, was found in 1977 by an individual prospector in the Southern California Desert using a metal detector.

There are various types of hobby activities involving metal detectors:

- Coin shooting is specifically targeting coins. Some coin shooters conduct historical research to locate sites with potential to give up historical and collectible coins.
- Prospecting is looking for valuable metals like gold, silver, and copper in their natural forms, such as nuggets or flakes.
- Metal detectors are also used to search for discarded or lost, valuable man-made objects such as jewelry, mobile phones, cameras and other devices. Some metal detectors are waterproof, to allow the user to search for submerged objects in areas of shallow water.
- General metal detecting is very similar to coin shooting except the user is after any type of historical artifact. Detectorists may be dedicated to preserving historical artifacts, and often have considerable expertise. Coins, bullets, buttons, axe heads, and buckles are just a few of the items that are commonly found by relic hunters; in general the potential is far greater in Europe and Asia than in many other parts of the world. More valuable finds in Britain alone include the Staffordshire Hoard of Anglo-Saxon gold, sold for £3,285,000, the gold Celtic Newark Torc, the Ringlemere Cup, West Bagborough Hoard, Milton Keynes Hoard, Roman Crosby Garrett Helmet, Stirling Hoard, Collette Hoard and thousands of smaller finds.
- Beach combing is hunting for lost coins or jewelry on a beach. Beach hunting can be as simple or as complicated as one wishes to make it. Many dedicated beach hunters also familiarize themselves with tide movements and beach erosion.
- Metal detecting clubs exist for hobbyists to learn from others, show off finds from their hunts and to learn more about the hobby.

Hobbyists often use their own metal detecting lingo when discussing the hobby with others.

==== Politics and conflicts in the metal detecting hobby in the United States ====
The metal detecting community and professional archaeologists have different ideas related to the recovery and preservation of historic finds and locations. Archaeologists claim that detector hobbyists take an artifact-centric approach, removing these from their context resulting in a permanent loss of historical information. Archaeological looting of places like Slack Farm in 1987 and Petersburg National Battlefield serve as evidence against allowing unsupervised metal detecting in historic locations.

=== Security screening ===
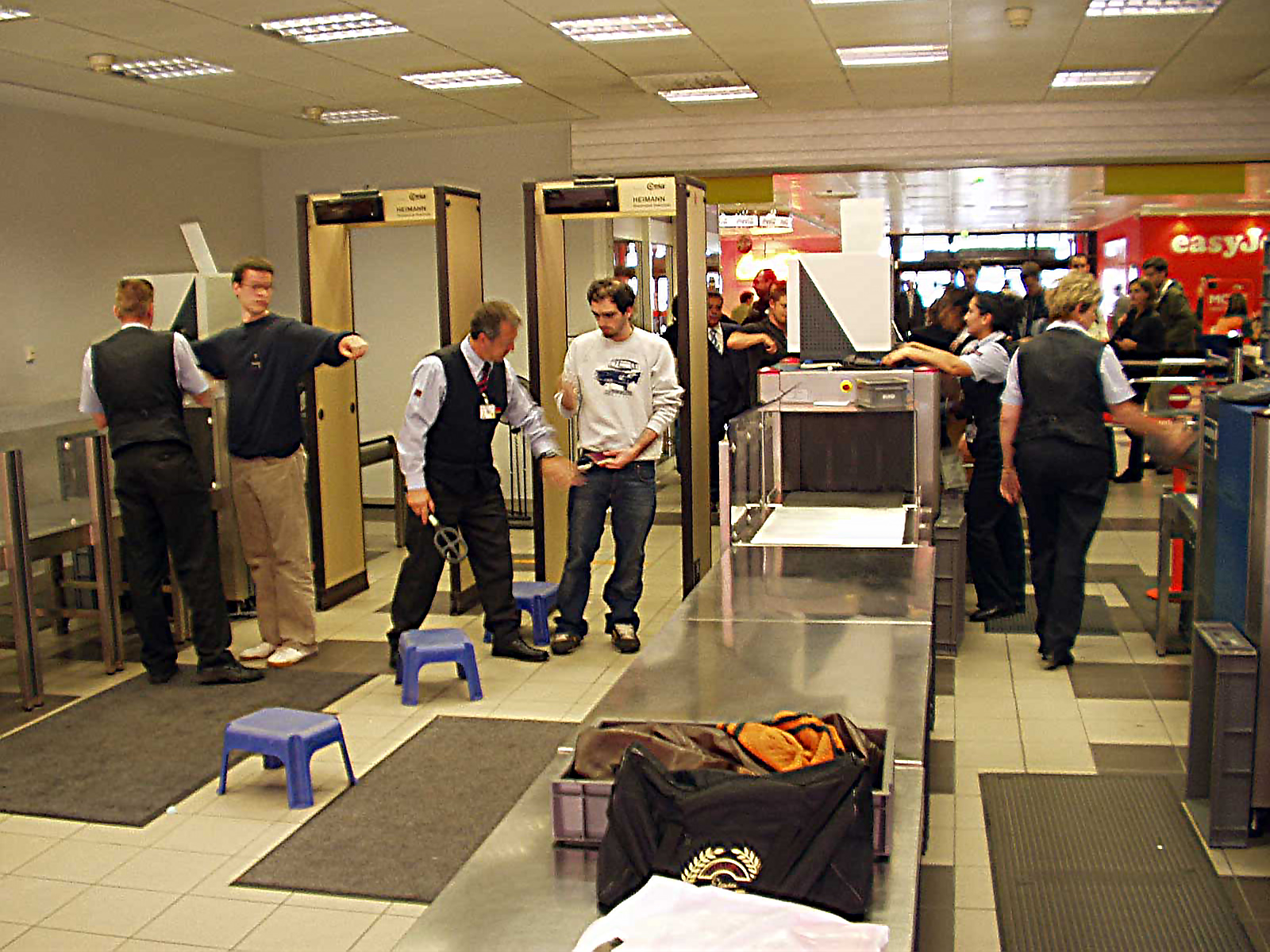
Metal detectors at Berlin Schönefeld Airport

In 1926, two Leipzig, Germany scientists installed a walk-though enclosure at a factory, to ensure that employees were not exiting with prohibited metallic items.

A series of aircraft hijackings led the United States in 1972 to adopt metal detector technology to screen airline passengers, initially using magnetometers that were originally designed for logging operations to detect spikes in trees. The Finnish company Outokumpu adapted mining metal detectors in the 1970s, still housed in a large cylindrical pipe, to make a commercial walk-through security detector. The development of these systems continued in a spin-off company and systems branded as Metor Metal Detectors evolved in the form of the rectangular gantry now standard in airports. In common with the developments in other uses of metal detectors both alternating current and pulse systems are used, and the design of the coils and the electronics has moved forward to improve the discrimination of these systems. In 1995 systems such as the Metor 200 appeared with the ability to indicate the approximate height of the metal object above the ground, enabling security personnel to more rapidly locate the source of the signal. Smaller hand held metal detectors are also used to locate a metal object on a person more precisely.

=== Industrial metal detectors ===
Industrial metal detectors are used in the pharmaceutical, food, beverage, textile, garment, plastics, chemicals, lumber, mining, and packaging industries. Contamination of food by metal shards from broken processing machinery during the manufacturing process is a major safety issue in the food industry. Most food processing equipment is made of stainless steel, and other components made of plastic or elastomers can be manufactured with embedded metallic particles, allowing them to be detected as well. Metal detectors for this purpose are widely used and integrated into the production line.

Current practice at garment or apparel industry plants is to apply metal detecting after the garments are completely sewn and before garments are packed to check whether there is any metal contamination (needle, broken needle, etc.) in the garments. This needs to be done for safety reasons.

The industrial metal detector was developed by Bruce Kerr and David Hiscock in 1947. The founding company Goring Kerr pioneered the use and development of the first industrial metal detector. Mars Incorporated was one of the first customers of Goring Kerr using their Metlokate metal detector to inspect Mars bars.

The basic principle of operation for the common industrial metal detector is based on a 3-coil design. This design utilizes an AM (amplitude modulated) transmitting coil and two receiving coils one on either side of the transmitter. The design and physical configuration of the receiving coils are instrumental in the ability to detect very small metal contaminates of 1 mm or smaller. Today modern metal detectors continue to utilize this configuration for the detection of tramp metal.

The coil configuration is such that it creates an opening whereby the product (food, plastics, pharmaceuticals, etc.) passes through the coils. This opening or aperture allows the product to enter and exit through the three-coil system, producing an equal but mirrored signal on the two receiving coils. The resulting signals are summed together effectively nullifying each other. Fortress Technology innovated a new feature, that allows the coil structure of their BSH Model to ignore the effects of vibration, even when inspecting conductive products.

When a metal contaminant is introduced into the product an unequal disturbance is created. That creates a very small electronic signal. After suitable amplification a mechanical device mounted to the conveyor system is signaled to remove the contaminated product from the production line. This process is completely automated and allows manufacturing to operate uninterrupted.

=== Civil engineering ===
In civil engineering, special metal detectors (cover meters) are used to locate reinforcement bars inside walls.

The most common type of metal detector is a hand-held metal detector or coil-based detectors using oval-shaped disks with built-in copper coils. The search coil works as sensing probe and must be moved over the ground to detect potential metal targets buried underground. When the search coil detects metal objects, the device gives an audible signal via speaker or earphone. In most units, the feedback is an analog or digital indicator.

The metal detectors were first invented and manufactured commercially in the United States by Fisher Labs in the 1930s; other companies like Garrett established and developed the metal detectors in terms of technology and features in the following decades.

=== Military ===
The first metal detector proved inductance changes to be a practical metal detection technique, and it served as the prototype for all subsequent metal detectors.

Initially these machines were huge and complex. After Lee de Forest invented the triode in 1907 metal detectors used vacuum tubes to operate and became more sensitive but still quite cumbersome. One of the early common uses of the first metal detectors, for example, was the detection of landmines and unexploded bombs in a number of European countries following the First and Second World Wars.

==== Uses and benefits ====
Metal detectors have several military uses, including:

- Exposing mines planted during the war or after the end of the war
- Detecting dangerous explosives and cluster bombs
- Searching people for weapons and explosives using hand-held metal detectors

==== War mine detection ====
Demining, also known as mine removal, is the method of clearing a field of landmines. The aim of military operations is to clear a path through a minefield as quickly as possible, which is mostly accomplished using equipment like mine plows and blast waves.

Humanitarian demining aims to clear all landmines to a certain depth and make the land secure for human use. Landmine detection techniques have been studied in various forms. Detection of mines can be done by a specially designed metal detector tuned to detect mines and bombs. Electromagnetic technologies have been used in conjunction with ground-penetrating radar. Specially trained dogs are often used to focus the search and confirm that an area has been cleared, mines are often cleared using mechanical equipment such as flails and excavators.

=== Technology development ===
==== Gerhard Fischer ====
Gerhard Fischer developed a portable metal detector in 1925. His model was first marketed commercially in 1931; he was responsible for the first large-scale hand-held metal detector development.

Gerhard Fisher studied electronics at the University of Dresden before emigrating to the United States. When working as a research engineer in Los Angeles, he came up with the concept of a portable metal detector while working with aircraft radio detection finders. Fisher shared the concept with Albert Einstein, who foresaw the widespread use of hand-held metal detectors.

Fisher, the founder of Fisher Research Laboratory, was contracted by the Federal Telegraph Company and Western Air Express to establish airborne direction finding equipment in the late 1920s. He received some of the first patents in the area of radio-based airborne direction finding. He came across some unusual errors in the course of his work; once he figured out what was wrong, he had the foresight to apply the solution to a totally unrelated area, metal and mineral detection."

Fisher received the patent for the first portable electronic metal detector in 1925. In 1931, he marketed his first Fisher device to the general public, and he established a famous Fisher Labs company that started to manufacture and develop hand-held metal detectors and sell it commercially.

==== Charles Garrett ====
Despite the fact that Fisher was the first to receive a patent for an electronic metal detector, he was only one of many who improved and mastered the device. Charles Garrett, the founder of Garrett Metal Detectors, was another key figure in the creation of today's metal detectors.

Garrett, an electrical engineer by profession, began metal detecting as a pastime in the early 1960s. He tried a number of machines on the market but couldn't find one that could do what he needed. As a result, he started developing his own metal detector. He was able to develop a system that removed oscillator drift, as well as many special search coils that he patented, both of which effectively revolutionized metal detector design at the time.

==== To present day ====
In the 1960s, the first industrial metal detectors were produced, and they were widely used for mineral prospecting and other industrial purposes. De-mining (the detection of landmines), the detection of weapons such as knives and guns (particularly in airport security), geophysical prospecting, archaeology, and treasure hunting are just some of the applications.

Metal detectors are also used to detect foreign bodies in food, as well as steel reinforcement bars in concrete and pipes. The building industry uses them to find wires buried in walls or floors.

=== Discriminators and circuits ===
The development of transistors, discriminators, modern search coil designs, and wireless technology significantly impacted the design of metal detectors as we know them today: lightweight, compact, easy-to-use, and deep-seeking systems. The invention of a tunable induction device was the most significant technological advancement in detectors. The method employs two tuned coils to produce electromagnetically induced acoustic noise. One coil serves as an RF transmitter, while the other serves as a receiver; in some situations, these coils may be tuned to frequencies ranging from 3 to 100 kHz.

Due to eddy currents induced in the metal, a signal is detected when metal is present. The fact that every metal has a different phase response when exposed to alternating current allowed detectors to differentiate between metals. Longer waves (low frequency) penetrate the ground deeper and select for high conductivity targets like silver and copper, while shorter waves (higher frequency) select for low conductivity targets like iron. Unfortunately, ground mineralization interference affects high frequency as well. This selectivity or discrimination allowed the development of detectors that can selectively detect desirable metals.

Even with discriminators, avoiding undesirable metals was difficult because some of them have similar phase responses (for example, tin foil and gold), particularly in alloy form. As a result, tuning out those metals incorrectly increased the chance of missing a valuable discovery. Discriminators also had the downside of lowering the sensitivity of the devices.

== See also ==
- List of metal detecting finds
- DEMIRA
- Detectorists (BBC Television series)
- Inductive sensor
- Induction loop
- Magnet fishing
- Portable Antiquities Scheme
