= Controlled explosion =

Bomb-disposal technique

A controlled explosion is the deliberate detonation of an explosive, generally as a means of demolishing a building or destroying an improvised or manufactured explosive device.

== Demolition ==
During demolition, controlled explosions can be used to collapse the exterior walls of a building inward, limiting damage to neighboring buildings. This requires careful placement of explosive charges on supports and load bearing walls.

== Bomb disposal ==
Controlled explosions are used by bomb disposal teams to detonate a bomb at a specific time in order to limit damage to nearby structures, vehicles, and people.

The bomb may be moved to a clear location away from bystanders or buildings before detonation unless it has (or is suspected of having) an anti-handling mechanism. If an anti-handling mechanism is found, the bomb may be left in place while the site around it is cleared. If it is not possible to clear the area or move the bomb, a containment vessel may be used to limit the damage from the explosion or transport the device to a cleared area.

Once the area is clear, a second explosive or shaped charge is placed on the device by explosive ordinance disposal (EOD or police bomb disposal) personnel, either manually or with a bomb disposal robot, and detonated remotely. The controlled explosion should also detonate or disable the suspected bomb.

== See also ==
- Bomb disposal
- Unexploded ordnance
- Demolition
- DEMIRA
- EOD
