= Golden West Humanitarian Foundation =

- Type: Non-Governmental Organisation
- Industry: Landmine relief
- Founded: 1998
- Headquarters: Woodland Hills, United States
- Area served: global
- Website: www.goldenwesthf.org

Golden West Humanitarian Foundation is an American Non-profit (501C3) organisation that develops technology to address the technical limitations of humanitarian mine clearance. The Golden West Humanitarian Foundation is based in Woodland Hills, Los Angeles, California.

== History ==
The foundation was created by chemical engineer Joe Trocino and his son Mike Trocino. In 2008, the Los Angeles Times reported that the organization used government grants and private donations to develop and support munitions-disposal systems in Southeast Asia and Central America.

== Role in Mine Action ==
=== Research and development ===
==== Explosive Harvesting Program ====
The Explosive Harvesting Program (EHP) is a manufacturing program which recycles the explosives contained in stockpiled explosive ammunition into the explosive charges used for humanitarian mine clearance.

==== Cluster Munitions Destruction ====
In 2010, the GWHF worked with Norwegian People's Aid in a groundbreaking cluster bomb stockpile destruction program.

=== Mine Risk Education (MRE) ===
==== Undercover UXO: Game for $100 Laptop (OLPC) ====
GWHF partnered with the Michigan State University M.I.N.D. Lab to develop a game for the One Laptop Per Child (OLPC) platform that teaches children the indicators of land mine and unexploded ordnance contamination. This game underwent field trials in Cambodia in June 2010.

==== Indicator Program ====
The Golden West Humanitarian Foundation has developed what they call the "Indicator Program", which trains people of all ages how to recognize the indicators of land mine and UXO contamination. This program has been deployed in Mozambique, Angola and Azerbaijan, and Cambodia.

==== Vinh & Trinh's Adventure ====
The GWHF published a 34-page illustrated storybook titled Vinh & Trinh's Adventure. The book is designed to teach Vietnamese children the dangers of unexploded ordnance, and it has received positive reviews. In 2010, the book underwent a third round of distribution, bring the total number of book published to 6,000.

== Current Operations ==
=== Cambodia ===
In Cambodia, the Golden West Humanitarian Foundation is partnered with the Cambodian Mine Action Center (CMAC) to provide research and development support to mine action activities in the Kingdom of Cambodia. These activities include the Explosive Harvesting Program, Mine Risk Education

=== Central America ===
The Golden West Humanitarian Foundation has undertaken ordnance stockpile destruction programs for the Organization of American States.

=== Vietnam ===
In 2009, the GWHF partnered with the Vietnam Veterans Memorial Foundation to undertake a research and development project sponsored by the U.S. Department of State.

GWHF also launched the Swim For Life drowning prevention initiative in response to high childhood drowning rates in Vietnam.

== Past Operations ==
=== Angola ===
In Angola, the Golden West Humanitarian Foundation has introduced their "Indicator Program", a Mine Risk Education program designed to teach the indicators of land mine and UXO contamination.

=== Azerbaijan ===
In Azerbaijan, the Golden West Humanitarian Foundation has introduced their "Indicator Program", a Mine Risk Education program designed to teach the indicators of land mine and UXO contamination.

=== Moldova ===
In 2009 & 2010, the GWHF worked on a cluster bomb disposal project in the Republic of Moldova.

=== Mozambique ===
In Mozambique, the Golden West Humanitarian Foundation has introduced their "Indicator Program", a Mine Risk Education program designed to teach the indicators of land mine and UXO contamination.

=== Nicaragua ===
In Nicaragua, the Golden West Humanitarian Foundation has worked with the Organization of American States on stockpile destruction programs.
