= Gerhard Fischer (inventor) =

Gerhard Julius Richard Fischer later Gerhard Julius Richard Fisher, Gerhard R. Fisher (March 18, 1899 – May 2, 1988) was a U.S. entrepreneur of German descent. He contributed to the development and popularity of the hand held metal detector.

== Biography ==
Fisher was born in 1899 in Landeshut, Silesia, to Richard Hugo Georg Arthur Fischer, an engineer, and his wife Margaretha Julia Fischer née Job. His mother was from Łódź, where the parents also married. Around 1906, the Fischer family moved to Dresden. After studying electrical engineering at the Dresden University, Fischer emigrated to the U.S. In 1931, he founded Fisher Research Laboratory, Inc. in Palo Alto, where he served as president until his retirement in 1967. While working with aircraft radio detection finders environment-dependent changes became apparent. From the interference by metal, he concluded that the device must also be suitable for detecting metal. Fisher shared the idea with Albert Einstein who correctly predicted the proliferation of hand held metal detector use. In 1937, he patented his metal detector. He died 1988 in Palo Alto.

=== Inventions ===
Although the actual inventor of the hand-held metal detector is disputed, the hand-held metal detector was made in 1925 and was first patented by Dr. Gerhard Fisher in 1931. A metal detector had been invented some forty years earlier (1881) by Alexander Graham Bell for the sole purpose of locating a lead bullet in President James A. Garfield.

=== Fisher Research Laboratory ===
He founded Fisher Research Laboratory to develop and market the hand held metal detectors in 1931.
