= Schwabinger 7 =

Tavern in Münchner Freiheit, Munich, Germany

Coordinates: 48°09′43″N 11°35′16″E

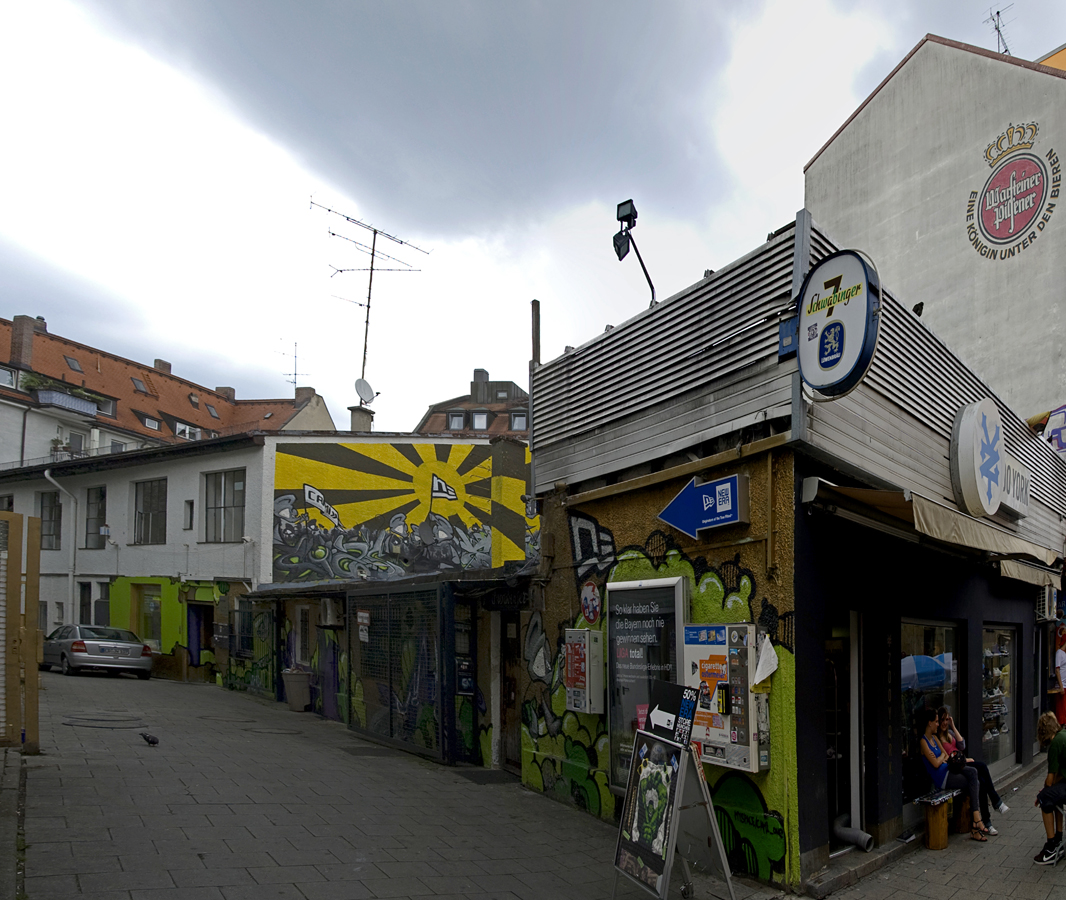
The original Schwabinger 7 (2009)

Schwabinger 7 or Schwabinger Sieben is a tavern in the Feilitzschstraße in the area known as Münchner Freiheit in Munich, Germany. The name comes from the neighbourhood Schwabing and the 7 is the house number of the original establishment.

== History ==
The premise was first established in a temporary building in the backstreet during the 1950s post-war era. In 1969, Gerd "Manila" Waldhauser became the owner of the establishment. In 2011 plans were made to demolish the building, which brought on a grassroots movement and protest to prevent it from happening. Although many locals believed the "Kultkneipe" (literal translation from German being Cult-pub) to be a landmark, though according to Der Spiegel Schwabinger 7 was the last dirty place in Munich, it was demolished in 2012. Previous owners were Fred and Ilsa Perlinger.

== Facility and reputation ==
The dark solid wood interior of the pub was unchanged for decades and was considered a classic location for rancid people of society and punks, not fully accepted in the gentrification of Munich. The Mayor of Munich, Christian Ude, denoted Schwabinger 7 as an "alcohol fuddling pub of a past period originally stationed in a construction building" and Der Spiegel said it was a "gloomy dark hole in the wall". Fans of the establishment nicknamed it "Schwasi".

== Demolition protest ==
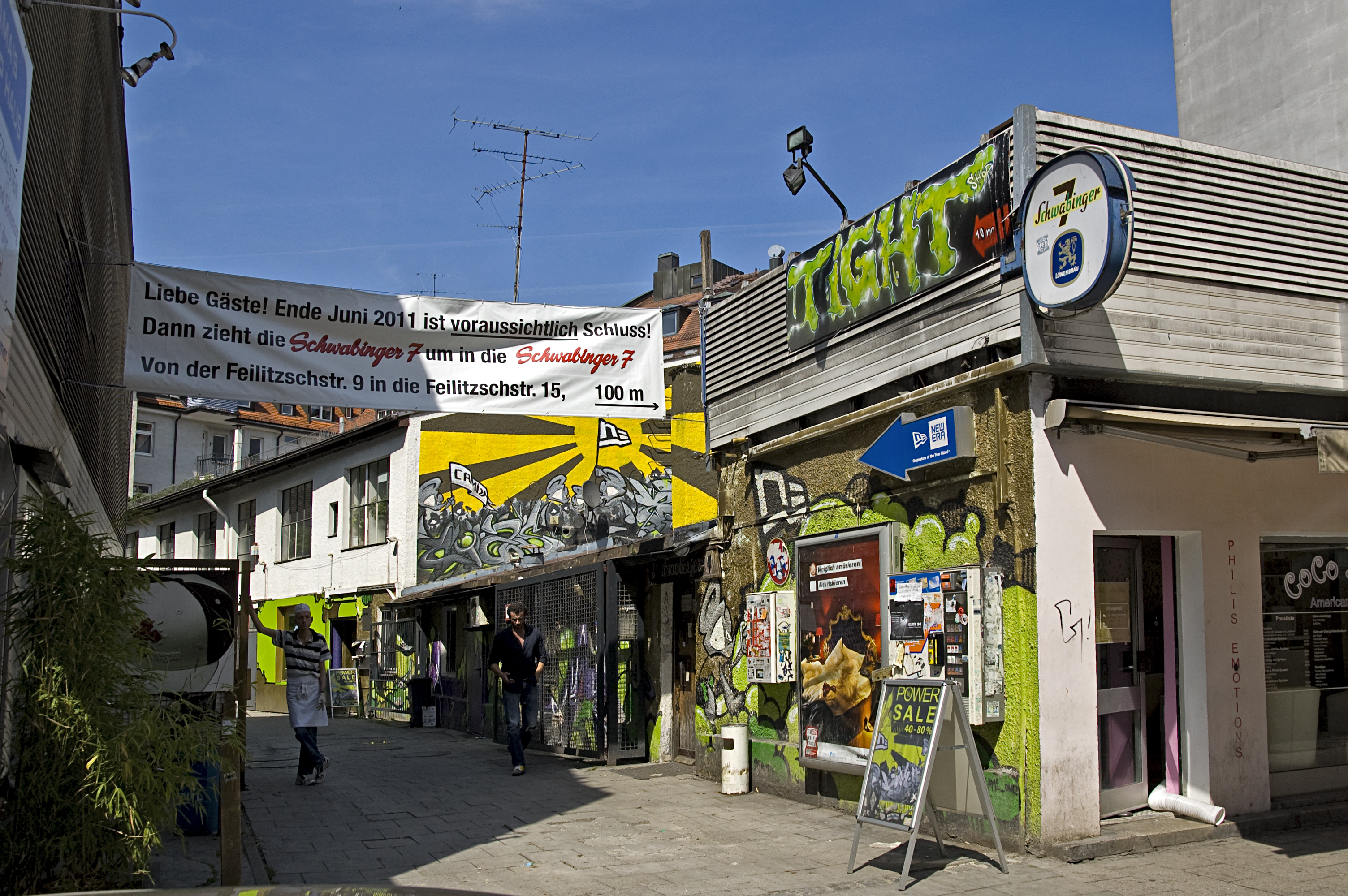
Schwabinger 7 before relocation (2011)

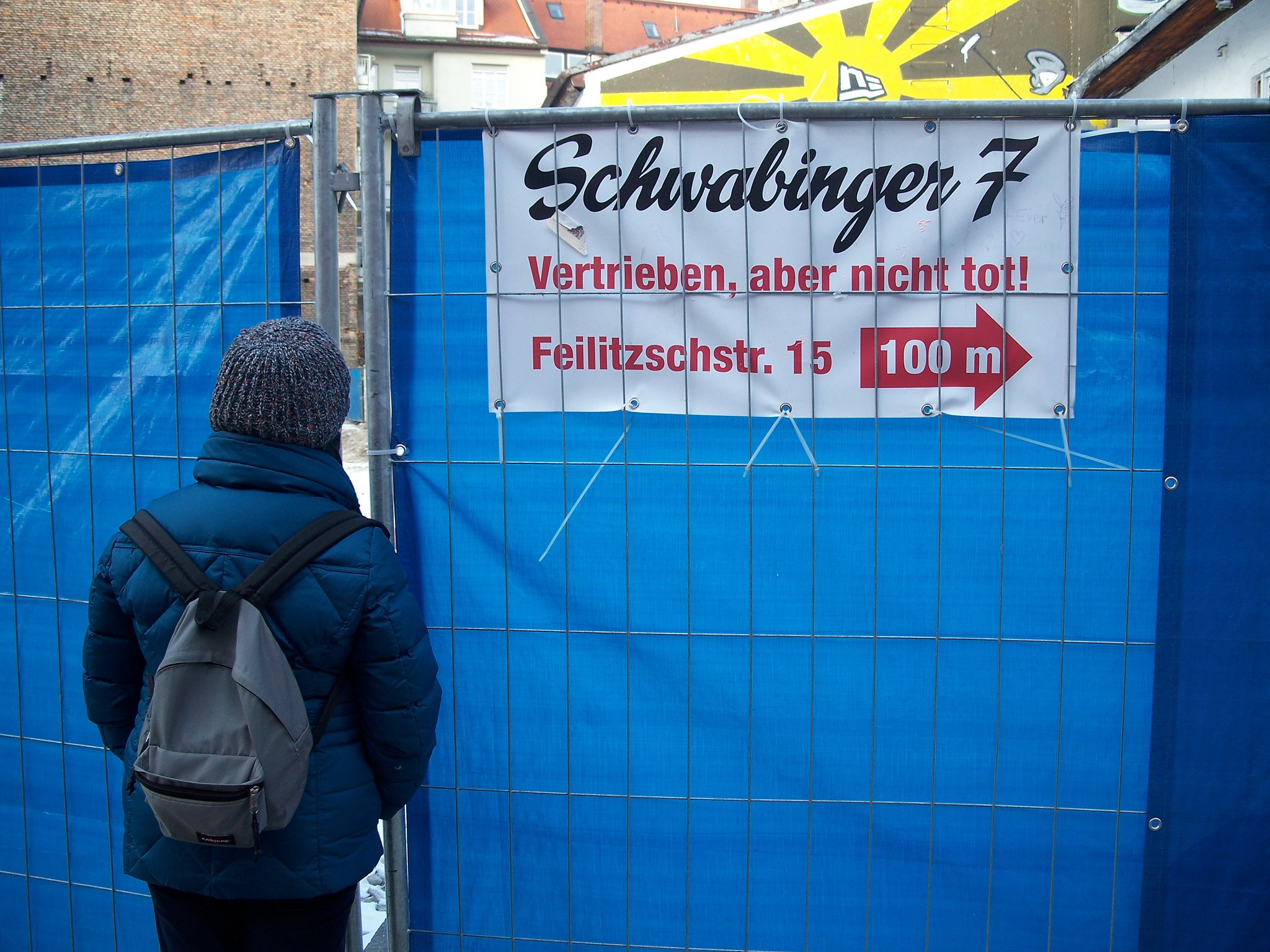
Construction sign after demolition in 2012

There were a number of protests when developers and city government made steps to demolish the building to make room for a housing development. Students organized a public campaign via social media and local activism, which brought it to the attention of the News media. The first protest garnered the attention of around 20 Journalists as well as a large number of police officers fearing an illegal gathering.

Another initiative was taken up by performance artist and organizer Till Hofman. Hofmann also is part of the Münchner Lach- und Schießgesellschaft (Performance arts and comedy group in Munich) and Münchner Lustspielhaus (Munich Comedy Club). The organization led to a motto of "Save Münchner Freiheit - on behalf of a cultural Schwabing" and garnered attention of a number of artists including Hannes Ringelstetter, Georg Eggers, Willy Michl, Michael Sailer, Moses Wolff, Sven Kemmler, Frank-Markus Barwasser alias Pelzig, Andreas Rebers and Konstantin Wecker. Ludwig Spaenle, as a member of the district committee, tried to make the location a historical building or a protected local landmark, but this was rejected.

Bayernultras of FC Bayern also took action to save and preserve Schwabinger 7 by holding up signs at the game against Vfb Stuttgart in the Allianz Arena. During the game a banner reading "Lieber in der dunkelsten Kneipe der Welt, als am hellsten Arbeitsplatz! Schwabinger 7 muss bleiben" ("Better to be in the darkest pub in the world, than at the brightest workplace! Schwabinger 7 must stay!") was displayed by the "schickeria".

Comedian Michael Mittermeier remarked that "Our children will find nail salons in place where today we have our pubs" showing dismay toward the destruction of the pub by people who feel the need to replace it with newer, cleaner establishments.

After the Mayor of Munich said he did not want to preserve the venue in its present state, the SPD representatives in the Landtag of Bavaria, Hans-Ulrih Pfaffmann and Franz Maget, as well as the CSU, agreed to demolish it in due time. The relocation of Schwabinger 7 from Feilitzschstraße 7 to Feilitzschstraße 15 included some of spolia.

== After demolition ==
=== Legal problems ===
The project to build a five-storey building in place of the previous establishment was for a short time halted by people living in Marktstraße. The complaints were because of the height of the new building, but evidence showed that there was a large building in the location before second world war bombings of Munich. This trumped the complaint and plans were continued.

=== Underground bomb found ===
Video of detonation

On 27 August 2012 a World War II 250 kg aircraft bomb was found just one meter under the surface. The bomb had a chemical fuse that could still have been functional and therefore could explode at any time under the right conditions. The Süddeutsche Zeitung brought this up with Waldhauser (owner of the pub), and he replied, "Obviously we did not party hard enough, or else the whole place would have been flattened. This quite nearly casts a poor light on the 7!" The bomb could not be defused, so a controlled explosion was performed on 28 August, which also meant that over 2500 people living in the area had to be evacuated. Because of the detonation, flaming straw flew on some of the roofs of the houses, though firefighters were already prepared in case of such emergencies and extinguished the threat. Seventeen nearby houses were harmed by the controlled explosion, with two severely impacted. Windows were smashed and window frames and the façades were damaged, incurring millions of euros in costs. A fashion boutique completely burnt down.
