= Peter Paul Althaus =

German poet

Peter Paul Althaus (28 July 1892, Münster – 16 September 1965, Munich) was a German poet.
