= Kammertheater München =

Theatre in Munich, Germany

Coordinates: 48°07′32″N 11°35′58″E

Kammertheater München, former known as Kammertheater Schwabing is a theatre in Munich, Bavaria, Germany.
