= No More Landmines =

UK-based charity

- Company type: Charity
- Industry: Landmine clearance
- Founded: May 2005
- Headquarters: London, United Kingdom
- Area served: Global
- Revenue: 660,660 pound sterling (2006)

No More Landmines (also known as The No More Landmines Trust) was a United Kingdom-based humanitarian landmine relief charity. The charity focused on landmine and unexploded ordnance removal, mine risk education programmes, and rehabilitation of survivors of landmine injuries. No More Landmines was established in May 2005 as the UK administrator of the United Nations Association Adopt-A-Minefield campaign, which has cleared over 21 million square metres of affected land since 1999. The charity closed in 2015, according to the Charities Commission.

== Countries of operation ==
- Afghanistan
- Angola
- Bosnia-Herzegovina
- Cambodia
- Colombia
- Croatia
- Iraq
- Mozambique
- Laos
- Vietnam

== Fundraising events ==
In March 2007, the charity launched the Dangerous Grounds Project, featuring free running in London's South Bank. By December 2007, the website, donated by UK2, had received 85,000 video views.

In London on November 1, 2007, The No More Landmines Trust in conjunction with Canadian sculptor Blake Ward opened a temporary exhibition named Fragments, comprising sculptures inspired by landmine victims.
