= Ukrainian Deminers Association =

The Ukrainian Deminers Association (UDA; Ukrainian: Асоціація саперів України) is a Ukrainian non-profit organization operating in the field of mine action. It was founded on 12 November 2018 by Tymur Pistriuha and a group of specialists with the aim of contributing to the development of the mine action system in Ukraine.

UDA is a certified mine action operator and carries out humanitarian demining activities, including non-technical survey, technical survey, clearance, and explosive ordnance disposal. Its areas of work also include Explosive Ordnance Risk Education (EORE) and Mine Victim Assistance (MVA).

UDA implements projects in cooperation with international partners and donors, including UN Women Ukraine, the Mines Advisory Group (MAG), Save the Children, the International Rescue Committee (IRC), Norwegian People’s Aid (NPA), the Canada-Ukraine Foundation (CUF), the Fondation suisse de déminage (FSD).

== Activities ==
=== Humanitarian demining ===
UDA conducts humanitarian demining operations in areas of Ukraine contaminated by landmines and explosive remnants of war. Activities are carried out in locations where active hostilities have ceased and include the detection and disposal of landmines and explosive remnants of war in accordance with national mine action standards.

UDA also develops mine detection dog capabilities as part of its humanitarian demining activities.

=== Explosive ordnance risk education ===
UDA conducts Explosive Ordnance Risk Education (EORE) activities aimed at reducing the risks posed by explosive ordnance. These activities seek to promote safer behaviour among both children and adults and to reduce the risk of injury and death caused by contact with explosive hazards.

The organization also provides online mine risk education courses.

To raise awareness of mine-related risks, UDA creates EORE-themed murals in different regions of Ukraine. Each mural includes a QR code linking to educational information about mine safety.

UDA also organizes mine risk awareness quests, including events held in Kyiv and Mykolaiv. These activities combine learning and interactive participation to help improve understanding of safety rules and encourage responsible behaviour in hazardous environments.

=== Mine Victim Assistance ===
UDA provides assistance to people affected by landmines and explosive ordnance. As part of this work, the organization receives and processes requests from affected individuals and provides financial, legal, and psychological support in cooperation with partner organizations.
