= Menschen gegen Minen =

Humanitarian organization

MgM - MineClearance NGO Stiftung Menschen gegen Minen e.V. ("People Against Landmines") is a humanitarian landmine clearance organization headquartered in Germany. It was founded on January 16, 1996, and is a registered charity under German law.

MgM provides de-mining services to areas that have recently emerged from warfare. Their efforts are focused in Africa, particularly in the countries of Angola, Mozambique, and Namibia. MgM employs a broad range of mine-removal technologies, including a fleet of specialized vehicles. The organization has also contributed to research and development in the de-mining arena. Prominent among their innovations is the "Rotar" armored de-mining vehicle, which is in use today around the world. Their "Voodoo" road clearance system for secondary roads is often called a class of its own. They combine armoured graders with explosives sniffer dogs. Until mid 2007 MgM officially cleared some 3,000 km of road into formerly not accessible areas.
