= DEMIRA =

German non-governmental organization

DEMIRA, or DEMIRA Deutsche Minenräumer e.V. (German mine clearers), is an international, humanitarian, non-governmental organization (NGO) registered in Germany. DEMIRA was founded in 1995 in order to provide humanitarian mine clearance, EOD (explosive ordnance disposal), as well as emergency medical aid and disaster relief to people living in postwar countries, and to victims of natural disasters and civil unrest.

== History ==
DEMIRA Deutsche Minenräumer e.V. was founded in 1995 by Martin Auracher. The headquarters were based in Munich until his death in 2016. In 2017, Marcia Auracher-Hamzat became executive director of DEMIRA e.V.. The headquarters are located in Sauerlach, Germany.

== Operations ==
DEMIRA has carried out:

- Humanitarian mine clearance, EOD and destruction of unexploded ordnance (UXO) in Angola, Mozambique, Namibia, and Bosnia & Herzegovina.
- Provided emergency medical aid and disaster relief after the tsunami in Sri Lanka, in the earthquake region of Kashmir / Pakistan, during the conflict in Lebanon, in the earthquake region in Java / Indonesia and in the Tohoku region in Japan after it was hit by a tsunami.
- Carried out minefield surveys and assessments in Somaliland, Lebanon, Croatia, Serbia and in Turkey.
- Conducted research and development of multi-sensor technology and mechanical mine clearance in cooperation with the Research Centre of the European Commission in Ispra / Italy, FOERSTER Reutlingen, TNO Netherlands and EMRAD England.

== See also ==
- Ottawa Treaty
- List of mine clearance agencies
