= Adopt-A-Minefield =

British charity

Adopt-A-Minefield is a British charity which raises awareness about landmines and their associated problems, and raises funds to clear minefields and help survivors of landmine accidents. It has raised over US$17 million (approximately £9.5 million) since it was established in the 1990s, enabling it to clear minefields in 126 villages in Afghanistan, Angola, Bosnia-Herzegovina, Cambodia, Croatia, Iraq, Laos, Mozambique and Vietnam.

No More Landmines was a partner organization. However, according to current records of the UK Charity Commission, The No More Landmines Trust Number 1110770 which has the working name of Adopt-A-Minefield was registered with them on 8 August 2008 and was removed on 20 January 2015 and marked as Ceased to Exist. There is no active website for either named organisation although there is information on line of many organisations that remove mines.

In 2006, Heather Mills, the ex-wife of Sir Paul McCartney, pledged to give a "large majority" of her £24.3 million divorce payment to the Adopt-A-Minefield organization. No donation had been made as of September 2008.

Adopt-A-Minefield was established by UNA Trust, a body associated with the United Nations Association UK. Mills and McCartney are its patrons. Other supporters include Twiggy and David Knopfler.

Gala fund-raising events were produced from 2001 to 2005 at hotels in Century City and Beverly Hills, California, with a diverse array of guest speakers in the landmine activist community from all around the world. The evenings concluded with dynamic performances by Sir Paul McCartney and his band, special musical guests, and was hosted by comedian and Tonight Show host Jay Leno. McCartney performed with guests Paul Simon (2001), Brian Wilson (2002), James Taylor (2003), Neil Young (2004), and Tony Bennett (2005). Some events also took place in Europe that featured performances of Paul with Yusuf Islam and Robin Gibb of the Bee Gees.

'Night of A Thousand Dinners' consisted of a variety of popular fund-raising events around the world including dinners in private homes and restaurants in New York City and London and a live music event in a local nightclub in Indianapolis, Indiana that featured a speaker from the Office of Weapons Removal and Abatement at the State Department in Washington, D.C., and a performance by a music artist who had once played in a band with guitarist Jimi Hendrix.
