= List of Canadian military operations =

Since 1947, the Canadian Armed Forces have completed 72 international missions. More than 3,600 soldiers, sailors and Air Force personnel are deployed overseas on operational missions. On any given day, about 8,000 Canadian Armed Forces members Royal Canadian Air Force, Royal Canadian Navy, and Canadian Army (one-third of the Canadian deployable force) are preparing for, engaged in or are returning from an overseas mission.

Canada's peacekeeping role during the 20th century has played a major role in its positive global image. Canada has served in over 50 peacekeeping missions. Canada has long been reluctant to participate in military operations that are not sanctioned by the United Nations (UN), such as the Vietnam War or the 2003 invasion of Iraq. Canada has faced controversy over its operations in some foreign countries, notably the 1993 Somalia affair.

Since the 21st century, Canadian direct participation in UN peacekeeping efforts greatly declined, with its military participation reallocated to UN-sanctioned operations through the North Atlantic Treaty Organization (NATO). This military reallocation resulted in a shift towards more militarized and deadly missions. Canada's participation in the Afghanistan war (2001–2014) saw over 160 Canadian deaths, the largest for any single Canadian military mission since the Korean War in the early 1950s.

Alongside many domestic obligations and a few ongoing peacekeeping missions, the Canadian Armed Forces are currently deployed in multiple foreign military operation. Below is a list of all currently active and past Canadian Armed Forces operations both within Canada's borders and internationally.

== Current and recurring operations ==
This section consists of Canadian Forces operations which are currently active, or conducted annually or on a periodic basis.

=== Domestic ===
- Operation Driftnet – In support of Fisheries and Oceans Canada. Multinational efforts to control driftnetting and other forms of illegal, unregulated and unreported fishing in the North Pacific Ocean.
- Operation LASER - Domestic response to the COVID-19 pandemic.
- Operation LENTUS – Contingency plan that outlines the joint response to provide support for Humanitarian Assistance and Disaster Response (HADR) to provincial and territorial authorities in the case of a major natural disaster that overwhelms their capacity to respond.
- Operation Limpid – Routine domestic surveillance of Canadian air, maritime, land, space, and cyber domains as well as presence in Canada's aerial, maritime and land approaches in order to detect, deter, prevent, pre-empt and defeat threats aimed at Canada or Canadian interests.
- Operation Nanook – To assert Canada's sovereignty over its northernmost regions, to enhance the Canadian Armed Forces' ability to operate in Arctic conditions, to improve coordination in whole-of-government operations, and to maintain interoperability with mission partners for maximum effectiveness in response to safety and security issues in the North.
- Operation Nevus – To perform essential preventive and corrective maintenance on the High Arctic Data Communications System (HADCS) located on Ellesmere Island.
- Operation Nunalivut – To assert Canada's sovereignty over its northernmost regions, to demonstrate the ability to operate in the harsh winter environment in remote areas of the High Arctic, and to enhance its capability to respond to any situation in the Canada's North.
- Operation Nunakput – To assert Canada's sovereignty over its northernmost regions, to enhance the Canadian Armed Forces' ability to operate in Arctic conditions, to improve coordination and cooperation in whole-of-government operations, and to maintain interoperability with mission partners for maximum effectiveness in response to safety and security issues in the North.
- Operation Palaci – Contribution to Parks Canada's avalanche-control program in Rogers Pass. To prevent uncontrolled, naturally occurring avalanches, and thus prevent blockage of the essential road and rail links between coastal British Columbia and the rest of Canada.
- Operation Sabot – Marijuana-eradication program conducted annually with the Royal Canadian Mounted Police.

=== Foreign ===
==== Americas ====
- Operation Hamlet – Participation in the United Nations Stabilization Mission in Haiti.

==== Africa ====
- Operation Crocodile – Military contribution to the United Nations Organization Stabilization Mission in the Democratic Republic of the Congo.
- Operation Saturn – To serve with UNAMID, the hybrid operation by the African Union (A.U.) and the United Nations in Darfur.
- Operation Soprano – Participation in the United Nations Mission in the Republic of South Sudan (UNMISS), the military component of a "whole-of-government" engagement in South Sudan that also includes the Royal Canadian Mounted Police.
- Operation Sirona – Military component of the Canadian whole-of-government contribution to fighting the Ebola outbreak in West Africa. Canadian Armed Forces (CAF) personnel will augment efforts undertaken by the United Kingdom to combat the spread of the Ebola virus disease (EVD) in Sierra Leone.

==== Asia ====
- Operation Neon - Canadian contribution to monitor United Nations Security Council sanctions placed on North Korea. The operation is renewed in 2023 up to 2026. Formerly done under Operation Projection until 2019.

==== At sea ====
- Operation Caribbe – Multinational campaign against illicit trafficking by transnational organized crime in the Caribbean basin and the eastern Pacific Ocean.
- Operation Artemis – Participation in counter-terrorism and maritime security operations in the Arabian Sea.
- Operation Projection - Royal Canadian Navy operations in the Asia-Pacific, Euro-Atlantic and African maritime environment in support of NATO Maritime Command, U.S. Naval Forces, and other allied operations.

==== Middle East ====
- Operation Jade – Contribution to the United Nations Truce Supervision Organization (UNTSO) in the Middle East
- Operation Gladius – Latest stage of Canada's long-standing participation in the United Nations Disengagement Observer Force (UNDOF) on the Golan Heights between Israel and Syria.
- Operation Calumet – Canada's participation in the Multinational Force and Observers (MFO), an independent peacekeeping operation in the Sinai Peninsula.
- Operation Metric – Periodic participation in international efforts to enhance security in the eastern Mediterranean region, specifically the Middle East and North Africa.
- Operation Proteus – Canada's contribution to the Office of the United States Security Coordinator (USSC) in Jerusalem.
- Operation Foundation – Contribution of headquarters and liaison staff to United States Central Command (USCENTCOM) to support operations in its area of responsibility, which extends from Egypt to Pakistan and includes the Middle East and southwest Asia. Supports Canada's efforts in the Middle East and southwest Asia, and promotes Canadian values through regular presence and exchange with military allies, foreign armed forces, and governments in the USCENTCOM area of responsibility.
- Operation Impact – Canada's contribution to the US-led international coalition against ISIS.

==== Europe ====
- Operation Kobold – Deployment to Pristina, Kosovo, to serve with the NATO-led Kosovo Force (KFOR).
- Operation Ignition – Periodic participation in the NATO – Airborne Surveillance and Interception Capabilities to Meet Iceland's Peacetime Preparedness Needs mission. This is an operation conducted to monitor Iceland's airspace and enforce security if required. Contributes to the security of Canadian airspace by monitoring and controlling air traffic in the northeastern approaches to North America.
- Operation Reassurance – Deployment in Central and Eastern Europe as part of NATO reassurance measures.
- Operation Snowgoose – Contribution to the United Nations Peacekeeping Force in Cyprus (UNFICYP).
- Operation Unifier – Contribution to support Ukrainian forces through capacity building, in coordination with the U.S. and other countries providing similar training assistance.

==== Worldwide ====
- Operation GLOBE - The Canadian Armed Forces's commitment to active engagement abroad. Allowed the opportunity to work alongside personnel from other government departments, as well as other nations. Currently used for deployments related to the COVID-19 pandemic abroad repatriating Canadians overseas, and United Nations-related transportation of humanitarian and food supplies on behalf of the World Food Programme and World Health Organization.

== Past operations ==
This section consists of Canadian Forces operations that are no longer active or on-going on an annual or periodic basis and are deemed complete.

=== Domestic ===
- Operation Abacus (Y2K preparation)
- Operation Assistance (Red River Flood, 1997)
- Operation Cadence (Security for the 2010 G8 and G20 summits held in Ontario)
- Operation Canopy
- Operation Grizzly (G8 Security in 2002)
- Operation Hurricane
- Operation Force (Assistance for 2011 Ontario Forest Fires)
- Operation Forge (2011 assistance to local authorities in Northwestern Ontario evacuating residents threatened by forest fires)
- Operation Lama (2010 assistance to southern and eastern Newfoundland following Hurricane Igor)
- Operation Lentus 13-01 (2013 CAF response to Request for Assistance from the Province of Alberta for help with humanitarian assistance and disaster relief operations)
- Operation Lentus 14-05: (2014 Assistance to the Province of Manitoba following flooding)
- Operation Lentus 14-03: Northern Ontario
- Operation Lentus 14-02: Northern Ontario
- Operation Lentus 14-02: Northern Ontario
- Operation Lentus 15-02: Northern Saskatchewan
- Operation Lentus 15-01: Kashechewan, Ontario
- Operation Lentus 16-01: Fort McMurray, Alberta
- Operation Lentus 17-01: Western Canada
- Operation Lentus 17-02: Manitoba
- Operation Lentus 17-03: Quebec and Newfoundland
- Operation Lentus 17-02: Kashechewan, Ontario
- Operation Lentus 17-01: New Brunswick
- Operation Lentus 18-01 - Kashechewan Floods
- Operation Lentus 18-02 - New Brunswick Floods
- Operation Lentus 18-03 - BC Wild Fires
- Operation Lentus 18-04 - Manitoba Wild Fires
- Operation Lentus 18-05 - BC Wild Fires
- Operation Lentus 19-01: Nova Scotia Hurricane Dorian Relief
- Operation Lentus 19-02: Pikangikum First Nation Evacuations
- Operation Lentus 19-03: New Brunswick, Quebec and Ontario Floods
- Operation Lotus (Assistance for the 2011 Lake Champlain and Richelieu River Floods)
- Operation Lustre (2011 Manitoba Floods)
- Operation Octal
- Operation Persistence (Swissair Flight 111)
- Operation Peregrine (BC Forest Fires 2003)
- Operation Podium (Vancouver 2010 Olympic and Paralympic Winter Games)
- Operation Preamble
- Operation Reconfiguration (1999 Migration of CF most C&C systems from Banyan to Windows prior to Y2K)
- Operation Recuperation (Ice Storm of 1998)
- Operation Splinter (Halifax and Atlantic Canada Hurricane relief after Juan 2003)
- Operation Pyramid (Victoria, BC Heavy snowfall (1m) 1996)
- Operation Salon (Oka Crisis in Oka, Quebec)
- CAF Operation Unique (1989–1991 Protection of CFB Goose Bay against protesters from NATO low flying operations)
- Operation Provision (2015–2016 Syrian Refugee Crisis)

=== International ===
This section covers past Canadian Forces operations that took place beyond Canada's borders. It includes peacekeeping operations as well as those through NATO and in participation with other allies.

==== Americas and Caribbean ====
- Operation Abalone (Provide medical treatment and assist with public health concerns on the island of St. Vincent in 1979)
- Operation Bandit (Evacuate Canadians in 1988 from Haiti following aborted elections in Haiti in 1987)
- Operation Cadence (Monitor the border between the Dominican Republic and Haiti in 1994)
- Operation Cauldron (Canadian mission with United Nations Mission in Haiti (UNMIH) in October 1993
- Operation Central (DART deployment to Honduras following Hurricane Mitch in 1998)
- Operation Compliment (Support to United Nations Civilian Police Mission in Haiti (MIPONUH)
- Operation Constable (Support to United Nations Transition Mission in Haiti (UNTMIH) from July to November 1997)
- Operation Eagle Assist
- Operation Forward Action (Multi-national operations in support of sanctions against Haiti in support of United Nations Security Council Resolution 841 from Oct 1993 to Sept 1994)
- Operation Halo (Support to United Nations Stabilization Mission in Haiti (MINUSTAH) from June to August 2004)
- Operation Heritage (Electoral observers and security advisers for elections in Haiti in December 1990)
- Operation Hestia (Response to 2010 Haiti earthquake)
- Operation Hugo
- Operation Humble
- Operation Jaguar (Contribution of military aviation and search-and-rescue capability to support the Jamaica Defence Force)
- Operation Match (Contribution to United Nations Observer Mission in El Salvador (ONUSAL) from 1991 to 1994)
- Operation Megaphone.
- Operation Noble Eagle
- Operation Stable (Support to United Nations Support Mission in Haiti (UNSMIH) from June 1996 to July 1997)
- Operation Standard (Support to United Nations Support Mission in Haiti (UNSMIH) from June to September 1996)
- Operation Sultan CF contribution to UN Observer Group in Central America (ONUCA)
- Operation Support
- Operation Unison (Canadian support to the 2005 Hurricane Katrina relief efforts in the United States)
- Operation Vision (Canadian support to the United Nations Verification Mission in Guatemala (MINUGUA) in 1997)
- Operation Quartz (Canadian support to the United Nations Verification Mission in Guatemala (MINUGUA) from 1998 to 2000)

==== Africa ====
- Operation Addition (Canadian contribution to the United Nations Mission in Ethiopia and Eritrea (UNMEE) from August 2000 to June 2003)
- Operation Augural (Canadian contribution to the African Union Mission in Sudan (AMIS) from July 2005 to August 2008)
- Operation Caravan (Contribution to the French-led Interim Emergency Multinational Force in Bunia, Democratic Republic of Congo from June to July 2003)
- Operation Consonance (United Nations Operation in Mozambique (ONUMOZ))
- Operation Deliverance
- Operation Eclipse (Contribution to United Nations Mission in Ethiopia and Eritrea (UNMEE) from November 2000 to June 2001)
- Operation Lance (United Nations Observer Mission Uganda-Rwanda (UNOMUR)
- Operation Lance 2 (United Nations Assistance Mission in Rwanda (UNAMIR)
- Operation Liane (Contribution to the United Nations Mission in Liberia (UNMIL) from September to November 2003)
- Operation Matador (UN Transition Assistance Group in Namibia)
- Operation Mobile (Canadian contribution to Operation Unified Protector and the 2011 Libyan civil war)
- Operation Module
- Operation Pastel
- Operation Passage

PASSAGE

- Operation Prudence (Contribution to the United Nations Mission in the Central African Republic (MINURCA))
- Operation Python (CF participation in the United Nations Mission for the Referendum in Western Sahara)
- Operation Relief
- Operation Reptile (Canadian peacekeeping contribution to the United Nations Mission in Sierra Leone (UNAMSIL) from November 1999 to July 2005)
- Operation Safari - Operation SAFARI was Canada's participation in the United Nations Mission in Sudan (UNMIS). As such, it was the military component of the Canadian whole-of-government engagement in southern Sudan, which involved the Department of Foreign Affairs and International Trade (DFAIT), the Canadian International Development Agency (CIDA), and the Royal Canadian Mounted Police (RCMP). Task Force Sudan, the Canadian Forces team deployed on Operation SAFARI, was the Canadian contingent in UNMIS. At its peak, Task Force Sudan comprised 30 Canadian Forces members, including 20 serving as United Nations Military Observers (UNMOs) at team sites across southern Sudan, eight on the staff at UNMIS Headquarters in Khartoum, and three with the Canadian support element in Khartoum.
- Operation Sculpture (Canadian contribution to the IMATT mission in Sierra Leone from 2000 – 2012)
- Operation Serval (Supported France's Operation SERVAL, which is their military intervention in the West African country of Mali.)
- Operation Solitude

==== Europe, Balkans and Mediterranean ====
- Operation Alliance
- Operation Artisan
- Operation Bolster, Former Republic of Yugoslavia
- Operation Boreas
- Operation Bronze – Deployment of teams of Canadian Forces members serving in key positions at NATO Headquarters Sarajevo from 2004 to 2010)
- Operation Cavalier – Bosnia and Herzegovina
- Operation Chaperon – Canadian contribution to United Nations Military Observers in Prevlaka (UNMOP) from February 1996 to September 2001
- Operation Echo – Canadian CF-18 deployment to Italy in support of the NATO Stabilization Force (SFOR) and Kosovo Force (KFOR) from June 1998 to December 2000
- Operation Fusion – Canadian support to the European Union's Operation Concordia in the Republic of Macedonia from 1 April 2003 to 12 May 2003
- Operation Harmony – Support to the United Nations Protection Force (UNPROFOR) in Croatia
- Operation Kinetic – Contribution to KFOR, the NATO peacekeeping force that operated in Kosovo and the Republic of Macedonia from June 1999 to June 2000
- Operation Mandarin
- Operation Palladium – Contribution to the NATO Stabilization Force in Bosnia-Herzegovina from December 1995 to December 2004
- Operation Quadrant (Canada's overall participation in international missions in Kosovo)
- Operation Sextant (Canadian Naval contribution to Standing NATO Maritime Group 1 from January 2006 to June 2009)
- Operation Sirius (Support to NATO coalition campaign against terrorism mission known as Operation Active Endeavour)
- Operation Speaker
- Operation Torrent (DART deployment to Turkey after the 1999 İzmit earthquake)
- NATO Operation Sharpguard
- NATO Operation Allied Force
- NATO Operation Joint Guardian
- Canadian Siberian Expeditionary Force

==== South Asia ====
- Operation Apollo – Operations in support of the United States in its military operations in Afghanistan. The operation took place from October 2001 to October 2003
- Operation Argus – Strategic Advisory Team Afghanistan (SAT‑A) from September 2005 to August 2008
- Operation Archer – Since July 2005 to July 2006, Canada's participation in Operation Enduring Freedom in Afghanistan has been conducted under Operation Archer
- Operation Athena (Canadian deployment with the International Security Assistance Force in Afghanistan)
- Operation Plateau (DART deployment so Muzaffarabad region of Pakistan after the 2005 Kashmir earthquake)

==== Southeast Asia ====
- Operation Marquis – United Nations Advance Mission in Cambodia (UNAMIC)
- Operation Structure – Disaster Assistance Response Team (DART) deployment to Sri Lanka after the 2004 Indian Ocean earthquake
- Operation Toucan -Peacekeeping support to the International Force in East Timor and United Nations Transitional Administration in East Timor (UNTAET) from October 1999 to April 2001

==== Southwest Asia and Middle East ====
- Operation Altair – Canada's contribution of warships in support of Operation Enduring Freedom in the Persian Gulf and the Arabian Sea from Jan 2004 to Oct 2008)
- Operation Angora – United Nations Interim Force in Lebanon (UNIFIL)
- Operation Accius – Contribution of two senior Canadian Forces officers to the Military Advisory Unit of the United Nations Assistance Mission in Afghanistan (UNAMA) from November 2002 to June 2005)
- Operation Assist
- Operation Augmentation (Canadian naval deployments in support of enforcing United Nations sanctions against Iraq in the Persian Gulf from June 1999 to October 2001)
- Operation Danaca (Canadian contribution to the United Nations Disengagement Observer Force (UNDOF) in the Golan Heights from 31 May 1974 to 23 March 2006)
- Operation Determination
- Operation Forum (United Nations Special Commission (UNSCOM))
- Operation Friction
- Operation Prevention (Canadian naval deployment from February to August 1997 in support of multinational Maritime Interception Force in the Persian Gulf to monitor and enforce various UN Security Council resolutions concerning the import and export of Iraqi commodities, including oil.
- Operation Iolaus
- Operation Keeping Goodwill
- Operation Lion (Assistance the Department of Foreign Affairs and International Trade to facilitate the departure of Canadians from Lebanon)
- Operation Record – Canadian support to the United Nations Iraq–Kuwait Observation Mission (UNIKOM) from May 1991 to August 2001
- Operation Scalpel
- Operation Scimitar
- Operation Vagabond (United Nations Iran-Iraq Military Observer Group (UNIIMOG))
- Operation Impact - from 2014 to present

== See also ==
- List of Canadian Peacekeeping Missions
- List of Canadian battles during World War I
- Military history of Canada
- Planned Canadian Forces projects
