= 12 (Vancouver) Field Ambulance =

- Active: 1914–present
- Country: Canada
- Branch: Canadian Army
- Role: Medical
- Size: Company
- Part of: Canadian Forces Health Services Group
- Garrison/HQ: Jericho Garrison
- Motto(s): Latin: militi succurrimus, lit. 'we hasten to aid the soldier'
- March: "The Farmer's Boy"
- Engagements: World War I World War II; War in Afghanistan: Operation Athena

Commanders
- Colonel in Chief: The Princess Royal

12 (Vancouver) Field Ambulance is a Canadian Forces Primary Reserve medical unit in Vancouver, British Columbia.

== History ==
This unit has a long and distinguished history that lives up to the medical corps tradition of being faithful in adversity. It is the latest in a line of Vancouver army medical units dating back to 18 Field Ambulance of World War I.

=== World War I ===
This unit started out initially as a local militia unit. In World War I, the field ambulance was sent to the 5th Canadian Division and stationed with the 72nd Battalion (Seaforth Highlanders of Canada), CEF, for a period of time. After the war, it was set up as a reserve unit and renamed 12 Field Ambulance. The unit was called to active service in World War II in 1939.

=== World War II ===
In 1942 the unit, now known as 12 Canadian Light Field Ambulance (the term "light" indicated that it was equipped to be particularly fast moving and so able to keep up with a swiftly advancing armoured division), sailed to England with the 4th (Canadian) Armoured Division. Providing medical support to the Division as they participated in operations within Europe. One of the unit's most significant action was in support of the 4th Armoured Division during the battle of Hochwald Forest. Captain Nathan Kaufman was Section Officer. His OBE award states that "On 2 March 1945, Captain Kaufman sited the most forward casualty collecting post in the Hochwald Gap and its position was responsible for the fact that early medical attention was given to the wounded in that sector. Through all operations this officer has shown a consistent devotion to duty combined with an ability to get forward and complete his job despite the personal risk involved. His willingness to serve and his efficient handling of casualties has been an inspiration to all ranks of his unit."

12 Field Ambulance made Canadian medical corps history becoming the only field ambulance to engage the enemy in combat. This occurred one morning in April 1945 in the German town of Sogel. German soldiers approached, and fired upon the casualty treatment facility under cover of darkness. The commanding officer quickly organized two platoons, and placed them at the approaches to the dressing stations. They held off the enemy for two hours; with weapons borrowed from the wounded – at the time medics did not carry weapons – until a squadron of tanks arrived to relieve them. During the fighting the dressing station continued treating patients. The commanding officer, Lieutenant-Colonel A.D. MacPherson received the Distinguished Service Order for his leadership in this action; Corporal F.F. Thompson was awarded the Military Medal, and Captain Harry Jolley was made a Member of the Order of the British Empire.

=== Post-World War II to 1999 ===
After the war, 12 Field Ambulance was reverted to the Army Reserve (Militia) and moved to Jericho Garrison in 1947. The unit was then renamed 24 Medical Company following another move to Bessborough Armoury. In 1969, the medical unit became attached to 12 Vancouver Service Battalion. In the early 1970s, the unit was disbanded along with all militia medical units across Canada. After existing as a medical station at 12 Service Battalion for several years, the unit was raised as 12 (Vancouver) Medical Company in 1980 and is relocated back to its present location at Jericho Garrison later that year. During this period, the unit participated in numerous peace keeping missions and served on tours in Bosnia, Croatia, Cypress, Aviano and the Golan Heights.

=== 2000 to 2007 ===
12 Field Ambulance was involved with local operations ranging from G8 Security in 2002 to fighting BC Forest Fires in the year 2003. Recently, the unit was awarded Freedom of the City from the city of Vancouver in 2007. In addition to domestic operations, the unit participated in operations overseas, most recently in Operation Athena in Afghanistan.

=== 2020 - COVID-19 ===
12 Field Ambulance collaborated with Provincial Health Services Authority, Vancouver Coastal Health, St John Ambulance and Canadian Red Cross, setting up the COVID-19 field hospital in Vancouver Convention Centre (VCC). The VCC was set up with 271 beds along with the PHSA Mobile Medical Unit as its resuscitation room. The field hospital never received any patients and was stood down on 13 July 2021.

== Notable members ==
=== World War II ===
- Captain Palmer: After meeting with Willem Johan Kolff, directed the construction of a Kolff type mechanical kidney in Vancouver.
- Corporal FF. Thompson: Noted for being in the picture capturing a German soldier at the Battle of Sogel, where he was given the Military Medal for his actions during the sortie.

=== Post World War II–1999 ===
- Lieutenant-Colonel Grasset: Proposed militi succurrimus (we hasten to aid the soldiers) as the motto of the CFMS in 1976. Taken into informal use shortly thereafter, it was formally approved on 10 August 1988.

== Awards ==
Freedom of the City of Vancouver was given to the 12 (Vancouver) Field Ambulance on April 14, 2007.

== Operations ==
12 Field Ambulance had members deployed in many domestic and foreign operations, including:

=== World War II ===
- Operation Blockbuster
- Operation Totalize
- Operation Tractable

=== Post World War II to 1999 ===
- Operation Calumet
- Operation Dana Ca
- Operation Echo
- Operation Harmony
- Operation Palladium

=== 2000 to Current ===
- Operation Athena
- Operation Grizzly
- Operation Peregrine
- Operation Paladium
- Operation Podium
