= Canadian peacekeeping =

Peacekeeping missions of Canada

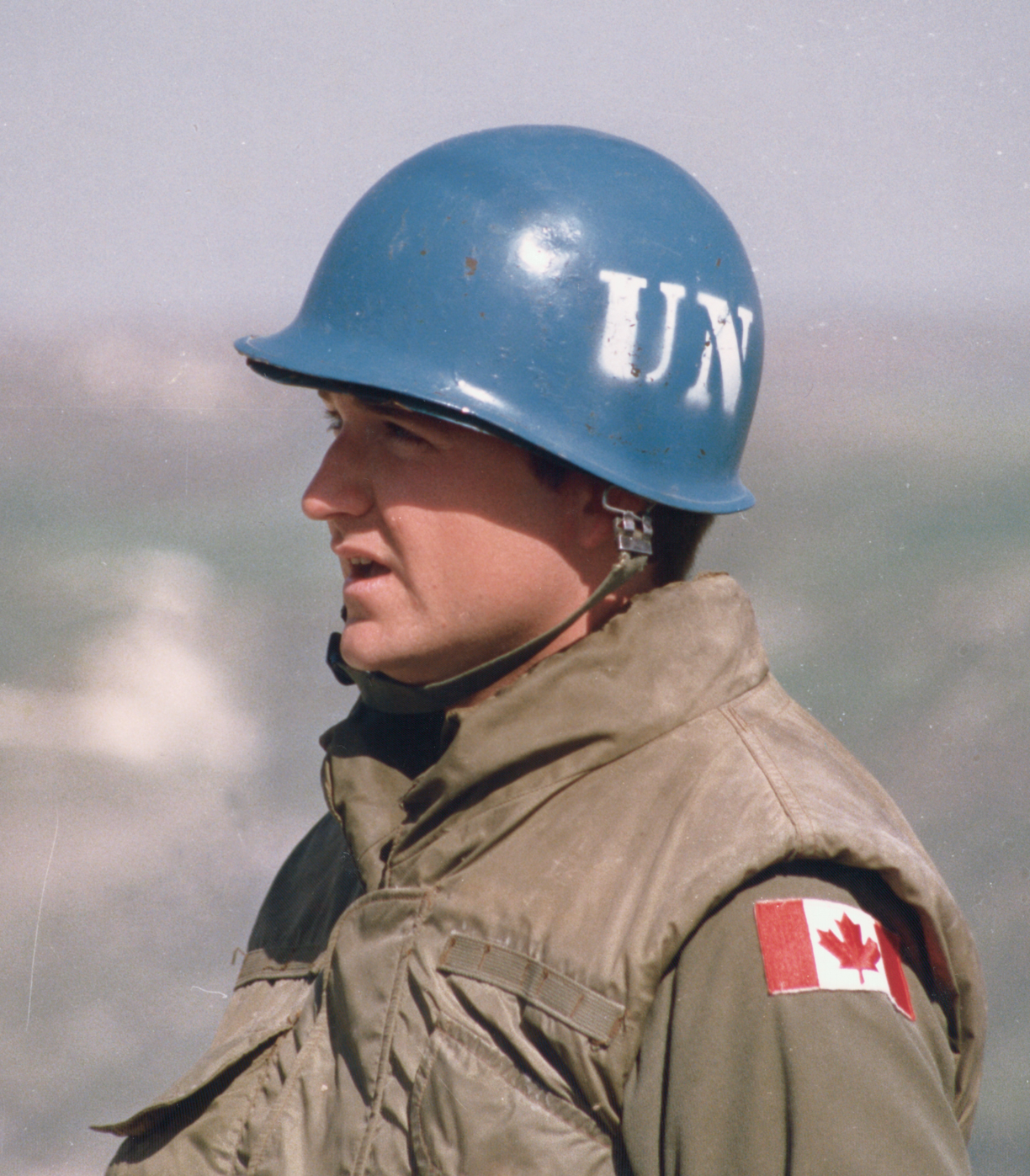
Canadian peacekeeper in 1976 wearing the distinctive flag of Canada and UN blue helmet

Canada has served in over 50 peacekeeping missions, including every United Nations peacekeeping effort from its inception until 1989. More than 125,000 Canadians have served in international peacekeeping operations, with approximately 130 Canadians having died during these operations. Canada's support for multilateralism and internationalism has been closely related to its peacekeeping efforts. Canada actively promotes its domestically shared values such as democracy, human rights, diversity, and the rule of law, through its foreign affairs engagements.

Canada's role in the development of and participation in peacekeeping during the 20th century led to its reputation as a positive middle power. Canada's successful role in mediating the 1956 Suez Canal Crisis gave it credibility and established it as a country fighting for the common good of all nations. The Canadian public came to identify the nation's peacekeeping role as the country's top contribution in international affairs.

Canada faced controversy over its involvement in some peacekeeping efforts resulting in a military reassessment in the late 1990s. By the 21st century, Canadian direct participation in UN peacekeeping efforts greatly declined, with its military participation reallocated to UN-sanctioned operations through the North Atlantic Treaty Organization (NATO). This military reallocation resulted in a shift towards more militarized and deadly missions, rather than traditional peacekeeping duties.

== Foreign relations context ==
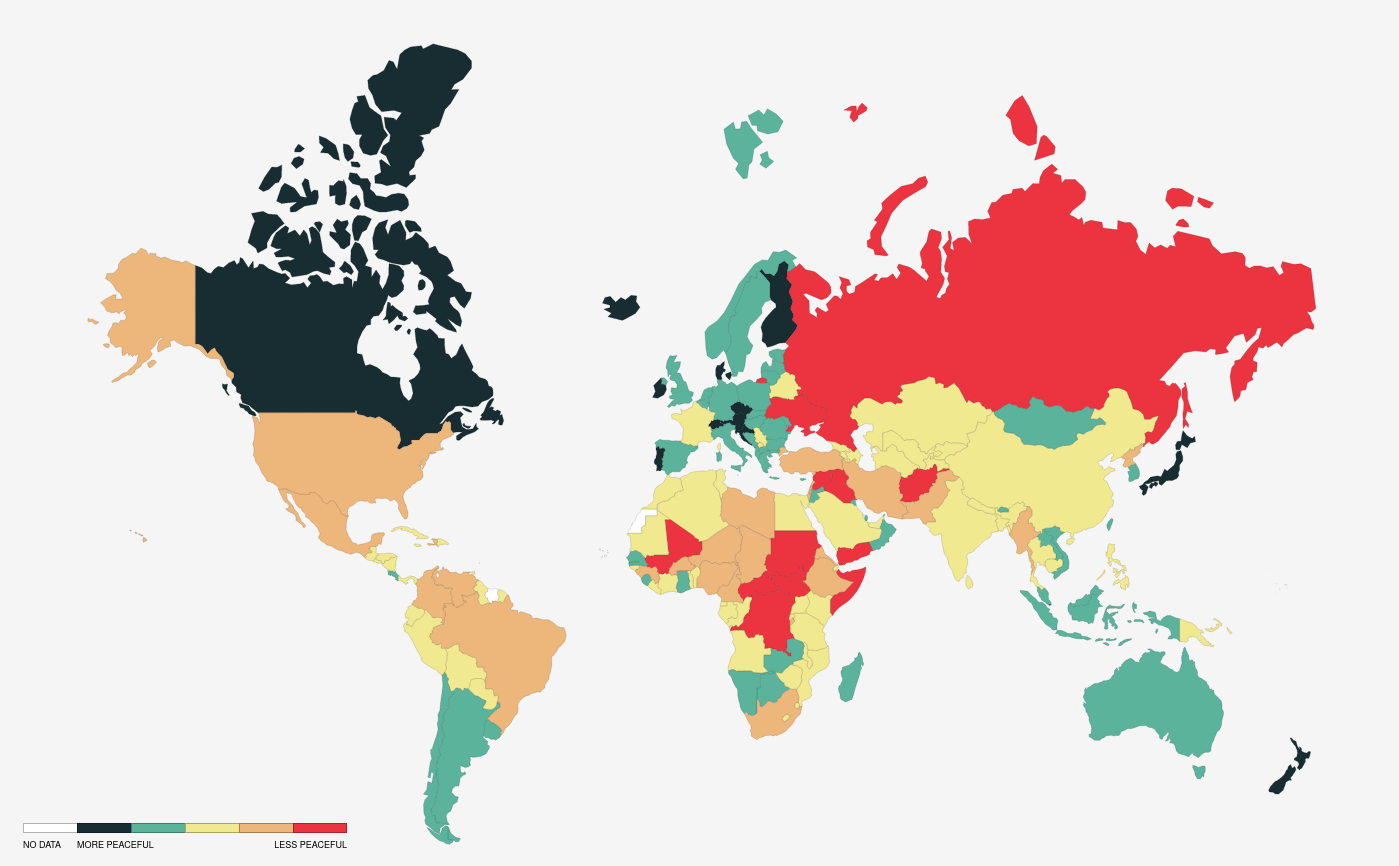
Global Peace Index 2023. Countries appearing with a deeper shade of green are ranked as more peaceful, countries appearing more red are ranked as more violent.

Canada's foreign policy of peacekeeping, peace enforcement, peacemaking, and peacebuilding has been intertwined with its tendency to pursue multilateral and international solutions since the end of World War II. Canada's central role in the development of the Universal Declaration of Human Rights in late 1940s, and peacekeeping in the mid-1950s gave it credibility and established it as a country fighting for the "common good" of all nations. Canada has since been engaged with the United Nations, NATO and the European Union (EU) in promoting its middle power status into an active role in world affairs, having fostered a very positive reputation on the world stage, widely viewed as a responsible and ethical country.

The "golden age of Canadian diplomacy" refers to a period in Canadian history, typically considered to be the mid-twentieth century, when Canada experienced a high level of success in its foreign relations and diplomatic efforts. In the early Cold-War years, Canada served as a mediator in international conflicts. The notion of peacekeeping became deeply embedded in Canadian culture and a distinguishing feature that Canadians feel sets their foreign policy apart from its closest ally, the United States.

Canada has long been reluctant to participate in military operations that are lacking UN Security Council approval, such as the Vietnam War, the 2003 Iraq War and 2026 Iran war. Canada has participated in US-led, UN-sanctioned operations such as the first Gulf War, in Afghanistan and Libya. The country also participates with its NATO allies in UN-sanctioned missions, such as the Kosovo Conflict and in Haiti.

== History ==
=== Inception of modern peacekeeping ===
External videos
- "Peace Operations " – Historica Canada - Record of Service. (2:45)

External videos
- The Lost Heritage Minute - “Lester B. Pearson” (variously called “Cyprus” and “Peacekeepers”)" – Historica Canada. - Heritage Minutes (1:02)

Lester B. Pearson, the Canadian Minister of Foreign Affairs, had become a very prominent figure in the United Nations during its infancy and found himself in a peculiar position in 1956 during the Suez Crisis. Pearson and Canada found themselves mediating a conflict involving their closest allies when the United States opposed the British, French, and Israeli invasion of Egypt. During United Nations meetings, Pearson proposed to the security council that a United Nations police force be established to prevent further conflict in the region, allowing the countries involved an opportunity to sort out a resolution. Pearson's proposal would intercede and divide the combatants, and form a buffer zone or 'human shield' between the opposing forces, offering to dedicate 1,000 Canadian soldiers to that cause was seen as a brilliant political move that prevented another war.

Pearson would be awarded the Nobel Peace Prize in 1957 and be called "the father of modern peacekeeping" for his role during the Suez Crisis. He would go on to serve as the 14th Prime Minister of Canada from 1963 to 1968 overseeing the creation of the distinctly Canadian flag that is worn by Canadian peacekeepers. During the Suez Crisis, Pearson was disturbed when the Egyptian government originally objected to Canadian forces as the Canada's Red Ensign contained the same symbol (the Union Flag) used by the United Kingdom, one of the belligerents. Pearson in 1967 summarized Canadian foreign policy as "based on Canadian considerations, Canadian values and Canadian interests."

=== Peacekeeping efforts ===
Canada participated in every UN peacekeeping effort from its inception until 1989. Prior to the creation of the formal UN peacekeeping system, Canada had engaged in UN intervention operations, notably the 1948 mission in the second Kashmir conflict. Since 1953 Canada has been involved in the first international unified command (UNCMAC) in support of the ongoing armistice between North and South Korea, and played a central role in the International Control Commission (ICC), which tried to broker peace in Vietnam beginning in 1954.

External videos
- " Dextraze in the Congo" – Historica Canada. - Heritage Minutes (1:01 min)

High-profile UN peacekeeping missions involving Canada include those in Congo (1961), Cyprus (1964), Lebanon (1978), Angola (1989), Somalia (1992), Rwanda (1993), East Timor (1999), Haiti (2004), Mali (2013), and observation missions in the Sinai Peninsula and Golan Heights during the mid-1970s. Canada also participated in multiple missions in the Balkans with the UN, NATO and the EU in Croatia from 1991 to 1995; Bosnia and Herzegovina from 1992 to 2010; Kosovo from 1998 to 1999; and the former Republic of Macedonia in 2001.

Since 1989, the Royal Canadian Mounted Police (RCMP) have been involved in peacekeeping missions related to training law enforcement personnel, notably the United Nations Civilian Police Mission in Haiti (MIPONUH) from 1997 to 2000 and the NATO led missions in Afghanistan for over a decade.

=== Personnel contributions ===
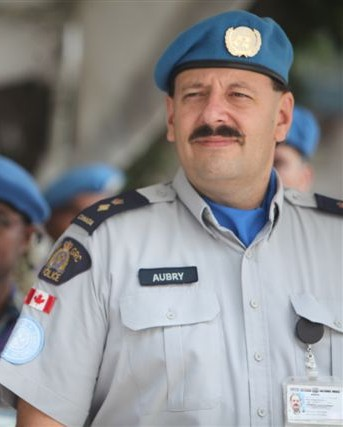
Royal Canadian Mounted Police peacekeeper in 2011 wearing the distinctive UN blue beret

Canada provided the most UN peacekeepers during the Cold War with approximately 80,000 personnel – equivalent to 10 percent of total UN forces. In all, more than 125,000 Canadian men and women military personnel, civilians, diplomats – including over 4,000 Canadian police officers – have served in peacekeeping operations. Approximately 130 Canadians have died in service of peacekeeping operations, with 123 of these deaths occurring during UN missions.

Canada's ongoing participation in United Nations Peacekeeping Force in Cyprus (Operation Snowgoose) that began in 1964, has seen over 33,000 Canadians serve with 28 deaths. Canada's largest contribution of approximately 40,000 personnel and resulting in 23 deaths, took place from 1992 to 2010 in multiple operations in the Balkans during and after the Yugoslav Wars. The death of nine Canadian Armed Forces personnel when their Buffalo 461 was shot down over Syria on August 9, 1974, remains the largest single death toll in Canadian peacekeeping history. The United Nations Stabilisation Mission in Haiti saw the death of two Canadian RCMP peacekeepers as a result of the 2010 earthquake.

Canada's "high point" of participation took place in April 1993, when there was 3,336 Canadian UN peacekeepers, with a record low number of 17 UN designated CAF members and 9 police officers deployed in July 2024. Canada's military in the same period had over 3,000 personnel deployed overseas in multiple non-peacekeeping operations. Canada has been criticized domestically and internationally for its non-fulfillment of UN personnel commitments in the 21st century.

=== Peacekeeping assessment ===
Assessments of peacekeeping operations deemed they are generally successful, usually resulted in long-term peace. The post–Cold War era has seen the concept and practice of peacekeeping evolve significantly. Traditionally focused on ceasefire monitoring and maintaining stability in conflict zones, peacekeeping missions evolved to have a wider range of activities including; peace enforcement, protecting civilians, promoting human rights, and supporting political processes in post-conflict societies.

External videos
- "Canada's peacekeepers face a troubled world " – CBC News: The National. 2016 (5:10 mins)

Critics argue that Canadian personnel may not consistently had the necessary training or resources to successfully navigate complex and volatile environments, leading to mixed results in their peacekeeping and peace enforcement efforts. Other criticisms include the perceived lack of clear objectives and mission parameters.

Canadian troops have been accused of being complicit in human rights abuses, notably in 1993 when the Canadian Armed Forces were deployed during the Somali Civil War to support UNOSOM I in a peace enforcement capacity. Soldiers from the Canadian Airborne Regiment tortured and killed a 16-year-old youth who broke into the encampment. Known as the Somalia affair, the incident has been described as "the darkest era in the history of the Canadian military" and led to the regiment's disbandment.

Canadian troops and the UN system have been accused of failing to adequately protect civilian populations in conflict zones, notably in 1994 when Canadian troops were deployed to the United Nations Assistance Mission for Rwanda. The mission was criticized for the perceived failure to prevent or intervene in the genocide that occurred, despite Canadian General Roméo Dallaire warning top UN officials of an impending humanitarian crisis. On 11 January 1994, General Dallaire, commander of UNAMIR, sent his "now infamous genocide fax" to UN headquarters, stating [the informant] has been ordered to register all Tutsi in Kigali to prepare "for their extermination".

=== Military reallocation in the 21st century ===
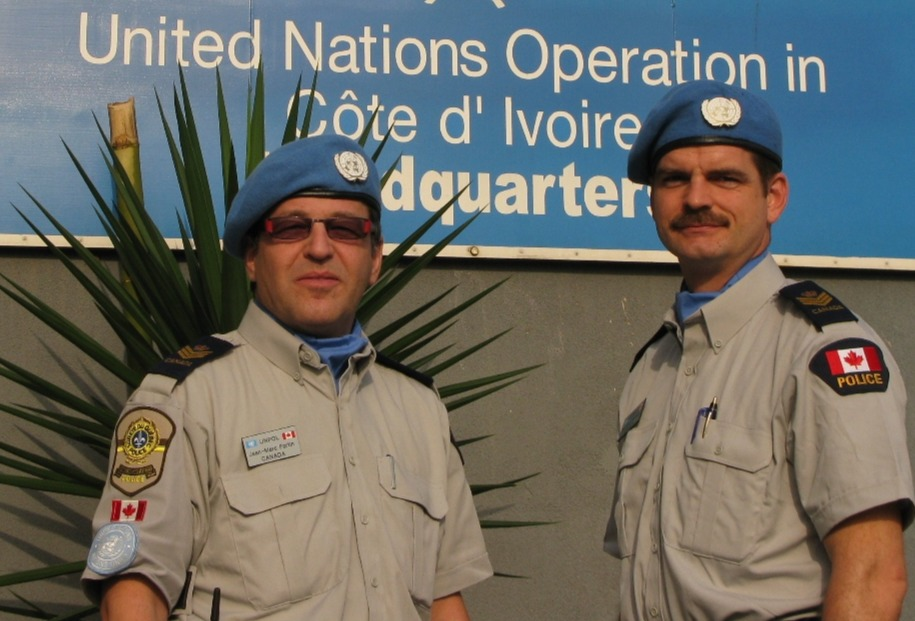
UN police officers from Sûreté du Québec during the UN operation in Côte d'Ivoire (2008)

A period of reassessment took place in late 1990s within the Canadian military and the United Nations after the Somalia and Rwanda missions. This led to the UN Security Council reducing the number of new operations, and thus a significant decline in Canadian direct participation in UN peacekeeping efforts. Canada began redeploying its military efforts to multilateral UN-sanctioned operations through NATO, rather than directly to the UN by the turn of the century. Despite the military reallocation the Canadian public views its smaller peacekeeping efforts in the 21st century as its "most important contribution to the world". A 2024 poll by CanWaCH found that 77% of Canadians believe it's important for Canada to help other countries in need.

External videos
- "Canada marks 10 years since the Afghanistan military mission's end" – CBC News: The National. 2024 (2;49 mins)

The military reallocation in the 21st century resulted in a shift towards more militarized and deadly missions, where Canadian troops were tasked with combat and security support roles rather than traditional peacekeeping duties. Most notably in several missions and campaigns in support of the global war on terror. Canada's participation in the Afghanistan war (2001–2014) saw 165 Canadian deaths, the largest for any single Canadian military mission since the Korean War in the early 1950s. Many within Canadian society expressed opposition to Canada's combative roles in Afghanistan on the grounds that it was inconsistent with Canada's historic role of peacekeeping. The Canadian government rhetoric of peacekeeping, peacemaking, and peacebuilding in support of the Afghanistan war despite Canada's combat roles was a point of contention within Canadian society.

Alongside many domestic obligations and a few ongoing peacekeeping missions such as the Multinational Force and Observers operation in the Sinai Peninsula, the Canadian Armed Forces, police and civilian personnel are currently deployed in multiple foreign military operations. Notable missions include; Operation Unifier in Ukraine training military personnel, Operation Caribbe in the Caribbean Sea related to the elimination of organized crime, Operation Projection in the Asia-Pacific, Euro-Atlantic and African regions in support of NATO operations related to maritime security and Operation Impact as part of the military intervention against ISIL.

== Financing ==
UN contributions (2022)
| Member state | % of UN budget |
|---|---|
| United States | 22.000 |
| China | 15.254 |
| Japan | 8.033 |
| Germany | 6.111 |
| United Kingdom | 4.375 |
| France | 4.318 |
| Italy | 3.189 |
| Canada | 2.628 |

The unpredictability of peacekeeping operations makes forecasting costs a challenging task for policymakers and budget planners. Canada has always fulfilled its financial commitment to the UN by paying its dues "in full, on time and without conditions" unlike other nations.

In 2022 Canada was the eighth-largest UN peace operations financial contributor with approximately $198.8 million for ongoing missions worldwide. Canada in total allocated $2.49 billion to multiple UN organizations including those related to peacekeeping, policing, research, training, climate change and humanitarian efforts such as medicine and food distribution. Canada's total military expenditure in the same period was approximately $26.9 billion, or around 1.2 percent of the country's gross domestic product (GDP) — placing it 14th for military expenditure by country.

== Recognition ==
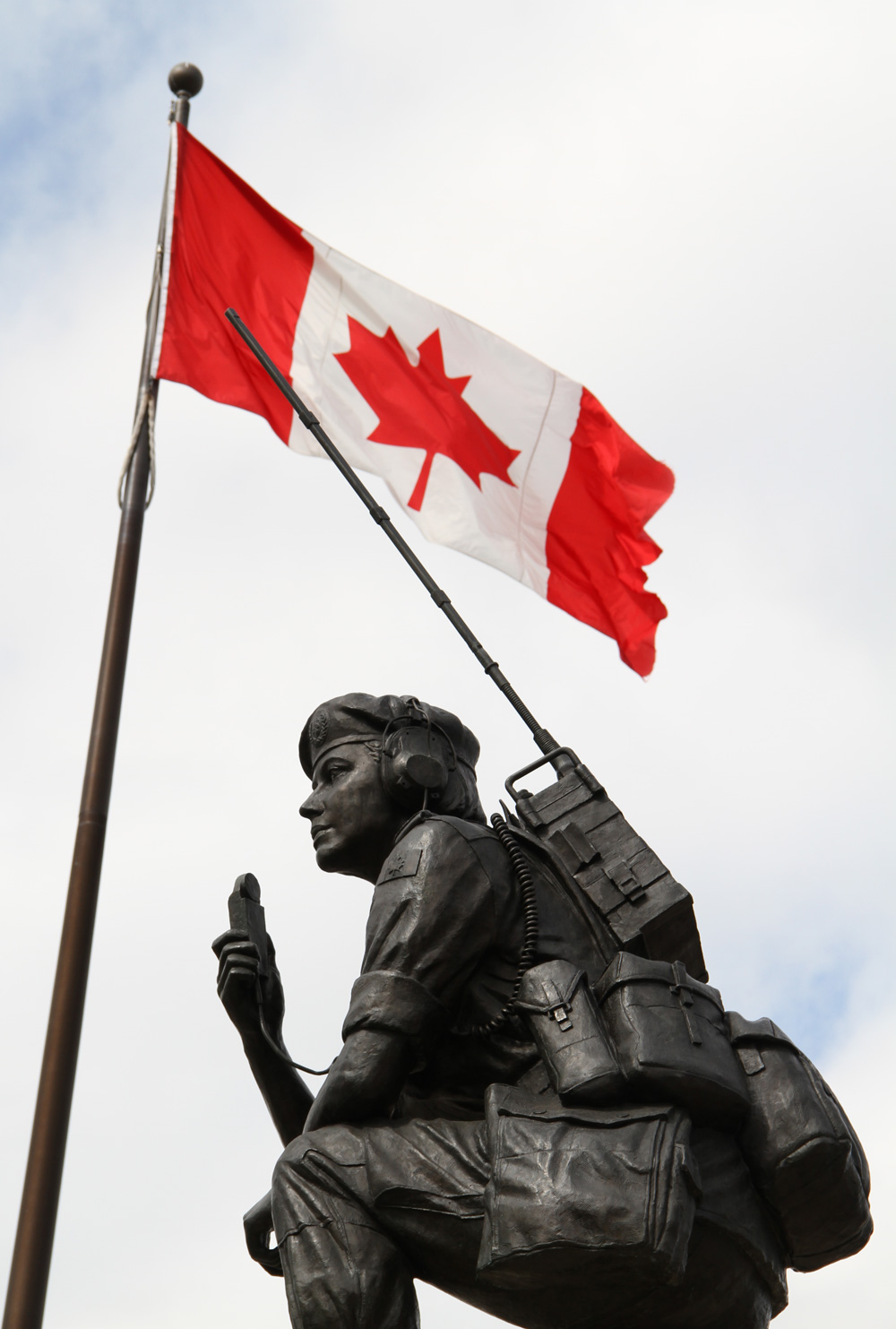
The Peacekeeping Monument in Ottawa, Canada

The Somalia Medal, a campaign medal created in 1992 to recognize Canadian military personnel who participated in the international military coalition invasion to stabilize Somalia, has been awarded to 1,422 individuals. In 1992, Reconciliation: The Peacekeeping Monument was completed, commemorating Canada's role in international peacekeeping and the soldiers and police officers who have participated and are currently participating, both living and dead. The 1995 Canadian one-dollar coin displays the Peacekeeping Monument. This commemoration was followed by the 2001 $10 Canadian banknote named "remembrance and peacekeeping" that depicts a female peacekeeper.

In 1988, the Nobel Peace Prize was awarded to United Nations peacekeepers, inspiring the creation of the Canadian Peacekeeping Service Medal in 1999 that has been awarded to over 75,000 Canadians. Since 2008, after a campaign by the Canadian Association of Veterans in United Nations Peacekeeping, August 9 has officially been National Peacekeepers' Day in Canada, with ceremonies taking place throughout the country at memorials and Peacekeeper Parks.

== List of UN missions ==
Below is a list of high-profile UN peacekeeping missions undertaken by Canada from 1947 to present, with Canadian operational names listed when assigned.

| Date | UN operation | Location | Conflict | Canadian operation |
|---|---|---|---|---|
| 1948–present | United Nations Truce Supervision Organization (UNTSO) | Middle East | Israeli–Palestinian conflict (initially) | Military observers |
| 1948–1950 | United Nations Temporary Commission on Korea (UNCOK) | North Korea | Korean conflict | Several civilian and military personnel |
| 1948–1950 | United Nations Temporary Commission on Korea (UNCOK) | South Korea | Korean conflict | Several civilian and military personnel |
| 1949–1979 | United Nations Military Observer Group for India and Pakistan (UNMOGIP) | India | Kashmir conflict | Military observers and military personnel |
| 1949–1979 | United Nations Military Observer Group for India and Pakistan (UNMOGIP) | Pakistan | Kashmir conflict | Military observers and military personnel |
| 1956–1967 | United Nations Emergency Force (UNEF I) | Egypt | Suez Crisis | Truce Supervisory Organization (UNTSO) |
| 1960–1964 | United Nations Operation in the Congo (ONUC) | Republic of the Congo | Congo Crisis | Long-term mission MONUSCO |
| 1962–1963 | United Nations Temporary Executive Authority (UNTEA) | Netherlands New Guinea | Transfer of sovereignty over Western New Guinea following the West New Guinea dispute | Security and law enforcement |
| 1962–1963 | United Nations Temporary Executive Authority (UNTEA) | Indonesia | Transfer of sovereignty over Western New Guinea following the West New Guinea dispute | Security and law enforcement |
| 1964–present | United Nations Peacekeeping Force in Cyprus (UNFICYP) | Cyprus | Cyprus dispute | Operation SNOWGOOSE |
| 1964–present | United Nations Peacekeeping Force in Cyprus (UNFICYP) | Northern Cyprus | Cyprus dispute | Operation SNOWGOOSE |
| 1973–1979 | United Nations Emergency Force, Middle East (UNEF II) | Egypt | Yom Kippur War | logistics/ signals air and service units |
| 1973–1979 | United Nations Emergency Force, Middle East (UNEF II) | Israel | Yom Kippur War | logistics/ signals air and service units |
| 1974–present | United Nations Disengagement Observer Force (UNDOF) | Israel | Maintains ceasefire following the Yom Kippur War. | Operation DANACA |
| 1974–present | United Nations Disengagement Observer Force (UNDOF) | Syria | Maintains ceasefire following the Yom Kippur War. | Operation DANACA |
| 1978 | United Nations Interim Force in Lebanon (UNIFIL) | Lebanon | 1978 South Lebanon conflict | Operation ANGORA |
| 1981–present | Multinational Force and Observers (MFO) | Sinai Peninsula | Enforce the Egypt–Israel peace treaty | Operation CALUMET |
| 1989–1990 | United Nations Transition Assistance Group (UNTAG) | Namibia | Namibian War of Independence | Operation MATADOR |
| 1991–1994 | United Nations Mission for the Referendum in Western Sahara (MINURSO) | Western Sahara | Western Sahara conflict | Operation PYTHON |
| 1992–1993 | United Nations Transitional Authority in Cambodia (UNTAC) | Cambodia | Conflict in Cambodia | Operation MARQUIS 1 and MARQUIS 2 |
| 1992–1995 | United Nations Protection Force (UNPROFOR) | Bosnia and Herzegovina | Yugoslav Wars | Operation Harmony |
| 1992–1995 | United Nations Protection Force (UNPROFOR) | Croatia | Yugoslav Wars | Operation Harmony |
| 1992–1995 | United Nations Protection Force (UNPROFOR) | Republic of Macedonia | Yugoslav Wars | Operation Harmony |
| 1992–1995 | United Nations Protection Force (UNPROFOR) | FR Yugoslavia | Yugoslav Wars | Operation Harmony |
| April 1992 – December 1992 | United Nations Operation in Somalia I (UNOSOM I) | Somalia | Somali Civil War | Operation CORDON |
| December 1992 – May 1993 | Unified Task Force (UNITAF) | Somalia | Somali Civil War | Somalia Affair |
| May 1993 – March 1995 | United Nations Operation in Somalia II (UNOSOM II) | Somalia | Somali Civil War | Operation DELIVERANCE |
| 1993–1996 | United Nations Mission in Haiti (UNMIH) | Haiti | 1991 Haitian coup d'état | Operation CAULDRON - October 1993; Operation PIVOT - March 1995 to April 1996; Operation STANDARD - April 1996 to Sept 1996 soldiers and civilian police |
| 1993–1996 | United Nations Assistance Mission for Rwanda (UNAMIR) | Rwanda | Rwandan Civil War | Operation LANCE |
| 1994–1996 | United Nations Confidence Restoration Operation (UNCRO) | Croatia | Croatian War of Independence | Canadian Battle Group through Operation MEDUSA; Operation WALLEYE for support |
| 1995–1999 | United Nations Preventive Deployment Force (UNPREDEP) | Macedonia | Aftermath of the Yugoslav wars | Observer |
| 1995–2000 | United Nations Mission in Bosnia and Herzegovina (UNMIBH) | Bosnia and Herzegovina | Bosnian War | Canadian Forces personnel and RCMP and civilian police |
| 1996–1997 | United Nations Support Mission in Haiti (UNSMIH) | Haiti | Stabilizing Haiti's democracy | Operation STANDARD and Operation STABLE |
| 1997–2004 | United Nations Transition Mission in Haiti (UNTMIH) | Haiti | Training of the Haitian National Police | Operation CONSTABLE |
| 1997–2000 | United Nations Civilian Police Mission in Haiti (MIPONUH) | Haiti | Training of the Haitian National Police | Operation COMPLIMENT |
| 1998–2000 | United Nations Mission in the Central African Republic (MINURCA) | Central African Republic | Mutinies in the Central African Republic armed forces | Operation PRUDENCE |
| 1999–2000 | The United Nations Transitional Administration in East Timor (UNTAET) | East Timor | 1999 East Timorese crisis | Operation TOUCAN |
| 1999–2000 | The United Nations Transitional Administration in East Timor (UNTAET) | Indonesia | 1999 East Timorese crisis | Operation TOUCAN |
| 1999–2002 | United Nations Interim Administration Mission in Kosovo (UNMIK) | Serbia | Kosovo War | Operation Kinetic and Operation QUADRANT |
| 1999–2002 | United Nations Interim Administration Mission in Kosovo (UNMIK) | Kosovo | Kosovo War | Operation Kinetic and Operation QUADRANT |
| 1999–2005 | United Nations Mission in Sierra Leone (UNAMSIL) | Sierra Leone | Sierra Leone Civil War | Operation REPTILE |
| 1999–2010 | United Nations Organization Mission in the Democratic Republic of the Congo (MONUC) | Democratic Republic of the Congo | Second Congo War | Operation CROCODILE |
| 2000–2002 | The United Nations Transitional Administration in East Timor (UNTAET) | East Timor | 1999 East Timorese crisis | Operation TOUCAN |
| 2000–2002 | The United Nations Transitional Administration in East Timor (UNTAET) | Indonesia | 1999 East Timorese crisis | Operation TOUCAN |
| 2000-2003 | United Nations Mission in Ethiopia and Eritrea (UNMEE) | Eritrea | Eritrean–Ethiopian War | Operation Addition |
| 2000-2003 | United Nations Mission in Ethiopia and Eritrea (UNMEE) | Ethiopia | Eritrean–Ethiopian War | Operation Addition |
| 2004 | United Nations Stabilisation Mission in Haiti (MINUSTAH) | Haiti | Aftermath of the 2004 Haitian coup d'état | Operation HALO |
| 2005–2009 | United Nations Mission in the Sudan (UNMIS) | Sudan | Second Sudanese Civil War | Operation SAFARI |
| 2008–2020 | United Nations/African Union Mission in Darfur (UNAMID) | Sudan | War in Darfur | Operation SATURN |
| 2018–2023 | Multidimensional Integrated Stabilisation Mission in Mali (MINUSMA) | Mali | Mali War | Operation PRESENCE |

== See also ==
- List of countries by number of United Nations peacekeepers contributed
- Canadian honours order of wearing
- International Day of United Nations Peacekeepers
- List of wars involving Canada
- Pearson Medal of Peace
- United Nations Department of Peace Operations
- United Nations Military Observer
- United Nations Police
- Women in peacekeeping
