= Operation Iolaus =

Operation Iolaus is the codename for the October 2, 2004, deployment of a Canadian Forces Attaché in conjunction with U.N. operations in the gulf region. CF senior officer Lieutenant-Colonel Alan Smith would serve with the United Nations as an advisor for the Special Representative of the Secretary-General (SRSG) in Iraq. The SRSG in Iraq is Mr. Ashraf Jehangir Qazi, from Pakistan. Lieutenant-Colonel Smith will be part of an international team who will advise the SRSG on matters affecting the UN in Iraq. Additionally, the mandate of the United Nations Assistance Mission for Iraq (UNAMI) includes assisting in the organization of elections and drafting of a new constitution, and coordinating various humanitarian operations.

== See also ==
- Canadian Forces
- List of Canadian military operations
- Operation Apollo
- Operation Athena
- Operation Accius
- Operation Altair
- Operation Foundation
