= Canadian Landmine Foundation =

Canadian charity

The Canadian Landmine Foundation (French: La Fondation des Mines Terrestres du Canada) is a Canadian charity that seeks to "raise awareness and funds to end the human and economic suffering caused by anti-personnel landmines".

== History ==
The organisation was launched in 1999 with backing from Queen Noor of Jordan, the then-Governor General of Canada Adrienne Clarkson, the then-Prime Minister Jean Chrétien, and the United States Senator Patrick Leahy. It has worked in Afghanistan, Nicaragua, Bosnia-Herzegovina, Croatia, Mozambique, and Cambodia, and has partnered with the Canadian International Demining Corps.

"Peacekeepers' Day", August 9, was established by the Canadian Association of Veterans in United Nations Peacekeeping with the support of the Foundation and Bernard Lord, then-Premier of New Brunswick.

Honorary directors of the Foundation are Norman Jewison, Patrick Leahy and Maurice Strong, whilst the board of directors includes the former ambassador for Mine Action Daniel Livermore, former Canadian Senator Sheila Finestone and statesman Lloyd Axworthy.

The Foundation runs the Canadian arm of Adopt-A-Minefield, a global mine action campaign that has raised over C$22 million for mine clearance and survivor assistance.
