= Peacekeeper Park =

Urban park in Calgary, Alberta, Canada

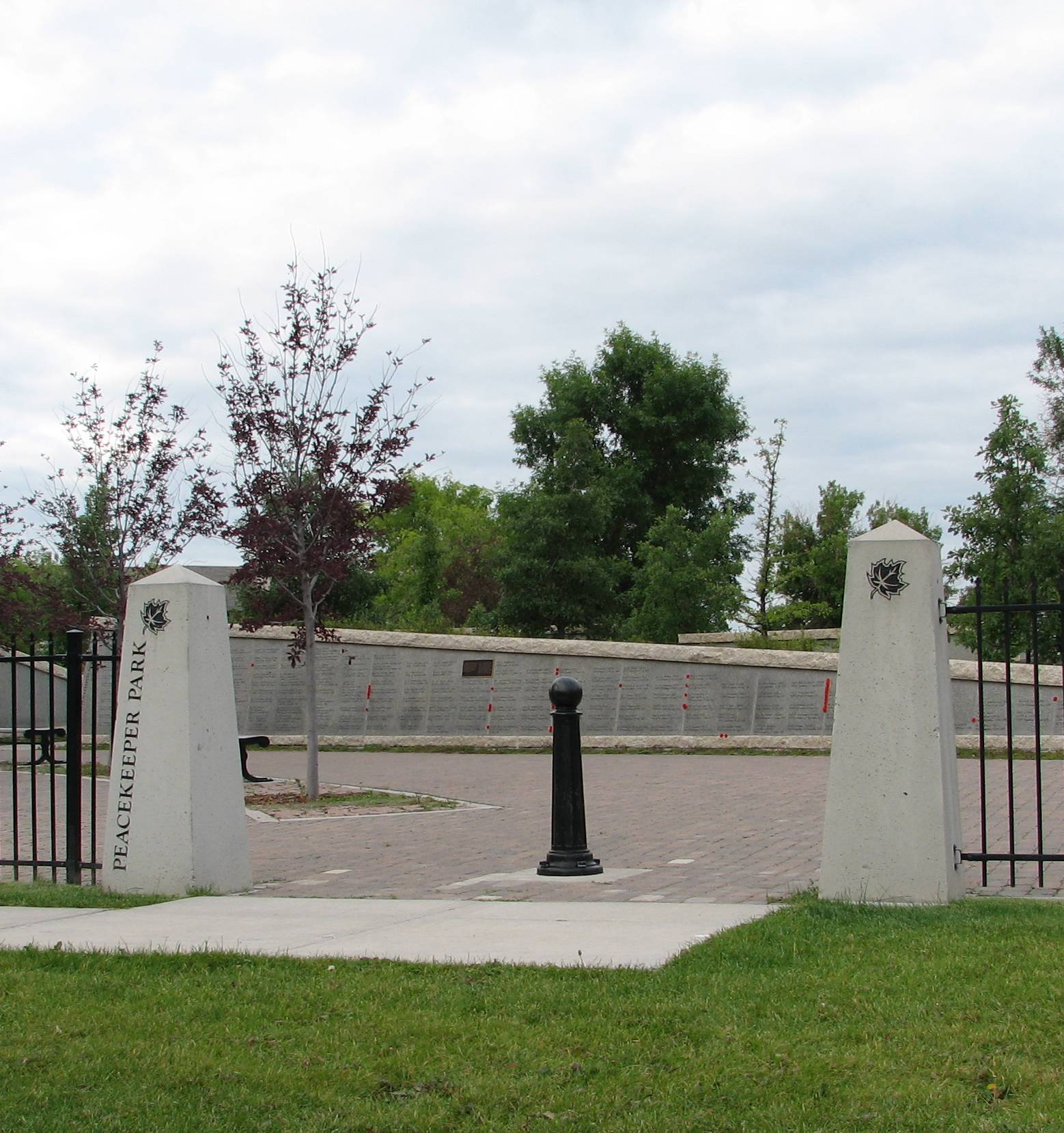
- Entrance to Peacekeeper Park
- Interactive map of Peacekeeper Park
- Type: Urban park
- Location: Calgary, Alberta
- Coordinates: 51.00365°N 114.11739°W
- Area: 4.57 acres (0.0185 km^{2})
- Created: 2004
- Operator: City of Calgary

Peacekeeper Park is an urban park in Calgary, Alberta. The park is located in the neighbourhood of North Glenmore, on the former grounds of Canadian Forces Base Calgary. The park includes a memorial wall with the names of Canadian Forces members who have given their lives on peacekeeping and peace support missions with the United Nations, NATO and other organizations since the end of the Second World War, including the current mission in Afghanistan.

== Description ==
The park encompasses 1.85 hectares and includes a memorial Wall of Honour and statuary dedicated to Canadian peacekeepers. "Mark R. Isfeld presenting small knitted dolls to Bosnian children" (2003) by André Gauthier (sculptor) was erected at Peacekeeper Park in Calgary. The "Izzy" doll is named after peacekeeper Mark Isfeld, whose mother crocheted small dolls for him to give to local children while on patrols during his peacekeeping tour. MCpl Mark R. Isfeld is named on the wall of the park, as he was killed by a landmine in Croatia on 21 June 1994.

A public playground is also hosted by the City of Calgary on the grounds.

== History ==
The park was built in 2004 in an area previously known as Lincoln Park, which during the Second World War had been an airfield of the British Commonwealth Air Training Plan. It was anticipated at the time of construction that the memorial wall would have enough space to last for 60 years due to the low mortality rate of Canadian peacekeeping missions. When the decision was made to include Canadian fatalities from the mission in Afghanistan, the wall was quickly populated and fundraising efforts were initiated to install a second wall to accommodate the growing list of soldiers to be commemorated.

== Events ==
The park is the focus of the annual Peacekeeper Day commemorations in Calgary, recognized nationally on August 9, the anniversary of an air crash in 1974 that killed nine Canadian peacekeepers of the UNEF mission. This event was commemorated in 2005 when a monument to the "Buffalo Nine" was dedicated a few blocks away at another new park called "Buffalo Park." On August 9, 1974, Canadian Forces Buffalo 115461 was making a scheduled supply flight from Ismaila, Egypt to Damascus, Syria when it was shot down by surface to air missiles. Nine Canadians were killed, marking the worst ever single day of loss for Canadian peacekeepers. It is the anniversary of this event, August 9, that has been declared a national National Peacekeepers' Day in Canada. The monument in Buffalo Park consists of a propeller from a Buffalo aircraft and a stone marker and plaque.
