= Canape (disambiguation) =

A canapé is a small, prepared and usually decorative food, held in the fingers.

Canape or Canapé may also refer to:

- CANape, a software tool for measuring & calibrating ECUs
- Canapé (bridge), a contract bridge bidding system
- Canapé (TV series), a cultural events show
- Canapé (furniture), an article of furniture similar to a sofa

== See also ==
- Canope or canopic jars, used by the ancient Egyptians
- Canopy
