= Operation Accius =

Canadian military operation

- Part of the War in Afghanistan (2001–2021)
Date	November 28, 2002 – 2004
Location	Afghanistan

Belligerents
Canada	Taliban al-Qaeda

Commanders and leaders
	(al-Qaeda) Osama bin Laden

Operation Accius is the Canadian military's contribution to the civilian-led United Nations Assistance Mission in Afghanistan (UNAMA). On November 28, 2002, the Minister of National Defence John McCallum announced that a senior Canadian Forces officer by the name of Lieutenant Colonel David Ross would be deployed to Afghanistan (until June 2004) to serve as the military advisor to UNAMA.

The UNAMA Military Advisory Unit comprises officers of the rank of Lieutenant-Colonel or equivalent from several nations, under the command of a Brigadier-General. Using the Kabul UNAMA office as a main base, the military liaison officers have several tasks, the most important of which is to provide timely military advice to the Kabul-based Special Representative to the Secretary-General. They routinely work at UN regional offices outside Kabul.

== Military liaison officer duties ==
The prime concerns of the military liaison officers are disarmament, demobilization and reintegration (DDR), which are handled by the UN through the "Afghanistan New Beginnings Programme." The DDR initiatives of the Afghanistan New Beginnings Programme will affect 100,000 soldiers, providing many with skills counselling and, sometimes, placement in non-military jobs. The military liaison officers help identify soldiers to be demobilized, and work with a Japanese-led International Observers' Group that ensures the process is fair, accurate and timely. DDR in Afghanistan is expected to take three years. The military liaison officers deal with many organizations, agencies and individuals operating in Afghanistan, including the following:

- All UN offices and many governmental and non-governmental organizations
- The Canadian Embassy in Kabul
- The Kabul-based International Security Assistance Forces (ISAF) (to which Canada is contributing nearly 2,000 troops under Operation Athena)
- The U.S.-led Office of Military Co-operation for Afghanistan, which is working on the reform of the Afghan Ministry of Defence and co-ordinating the training of the new Afghan National Army
- The military attachés from the various embassies and Afghan lobby groups.
- UNAMA is responsible for planning and conducting all UN activities in Afghanistan, focusing on political affairs and relief, recovery and reconstruction efforts in co-ordination with the Afghan Transitional Authority.

== See also ==
- Canadian Forces
- List of Canadian military operations
- Operation Altair
- Operation Athena
- United Nations Assistance Mission in Afghanistan
