= United Nations Security Council Resolution 1121 =

UN Security Council Resolution 1121
- United Nations peacekeeping missions
- Date: 22 July 1997
- Meeting no.: 3,802
- Code: S/RES/1121 (Document)
- Subject: United Nations peacekeeping: Dag Hammarskjöld Medal
- Voting summary: 15 voted for; None voted against; None abstained
- Result: Adopted

Security Council composition
- Permanent members: China; France; Russia; United Kingdom; United States
- Non-permanent members: Chile; Costa Rica; Egypt; Guinea-Bissau; Japan; Kenya; South Korea; Poland; Portugal; Sweden

United Nations Security Council resolution 1121, adopted unanimously on 22 July 1997, after recalling that the maintenance of international peace and security was one of the main purposes of the United Nations, the council established the Dag Hammarskjöld Medal, named after the second Secretary-General Dag Hammarskjöld, awarded posthumously to United Nations peacekeepers.

The council recalled that the 1988 Nobel Peace Prize was awarded to United Nations peacekeepers. It recognised that over 1,500 individuals from 85 countries had died in peacekeeping operations and that the Dag Hammarskjöld Medal would serve as a tribute to their sacrifice. The Secretary-General Kofi Annan was requested to establish criteria and procedures for the awarding of the medal, and other countries were requested to co-operate with its presentation.

== See also ==
- International Day of United Nations Peacekeepers
- List of United Nations peacekeeping missions
- List of United Nations Security Council Resolutions 1101 to 1200 (1997–1998)
- United Nations Security Council Resolution 868
