= Operation Eagle Assist =

NATO military operation

- Part of the war on terror
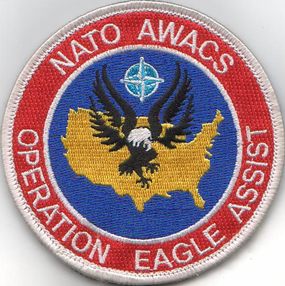
- Location: United States
- Objective: Homeland security
- Date: October 9, 2001 – May 16, 2002
- Executed by: NATO

Operation Eagle Assist was a NATO operation where AWACS aircraft patrolled the skies over the United States following the September 11 attacks.

On October 4, about a month after the September 11 attacks, the North Atlantic Council decided to operationalize Article 5 of the North Atlantic Treaty. The operation began on October 9, 2001. It was NATO's first deployment "in the defense of one of its member countries". In total, 830 crew members from 13 NATO nations executed 360 operational sorties, totaling nearly 4300 hours.

The operation ended on May 16, 2002. The decision to terminate "was made on the basis of upgrades to the U.S. air defense posture, enhanced cooperation between U.S. civil and military authorities, and on mandatory evaluations of homeland security requirements."

== See also ==
- List of Canadian military operations
- Operation Noble Eagle
