= Daniel Livermore =

Canadian academic and historian

J. Daniel Livermore is a Canadian academic and historian who was formerly a foreign service officer in Canada's Department of Foreign Affairs and International Trade.

Born in St. Catharines, Ontario, in 1946, Livermore was educated in public schools in St. Catharines (Edith Cavell Public School and Sir Winston Churchill Secondary School). He obtained his B.A. in History and Politics from Brock University in 1969, his Master's from Carleton University in 1970, and his PhD from Queen's University in 1975. He also did additional graduate work in international relations at Johns Hopkins University in Washington, D.C. In 1993–1994, he was the Skelton-Clark Fellow and Senior Visiting Associate at the Centre for International Relations at Queen's University.

Livermore joined Canada's Department of External Affairs (as it was then known) in 1975. Over the course of the next thirty years he served in a variety of headquarters roles. He was the director of the Human Rights Division, the Peacekeeping and Regional Security Division, and the Policy Planning Staff. He was also seconded to the Privy Council Office. He served abroad at the Canadian Permanent Mission to the United Nations, New York, the Canadian Embassy, Santiago, Chile, and the Canadian Embassy, Washington, D.C., where he was Minister-Counsellor and head of the political section.

Between 1996 and 1999, he was Canada's ambassador to Guatemala and El Salvador. From 1999 to 2002, he was the Canadian ambassador for mine action, responsible for coordinating Canadian policy and action in the international campaign to ban landmines. Upon leaving that position, he was awarded the Queen's Golden Jubilee Medal. The Canadian Landmine Foundation also cleared 24,568 m^{2} (264,450 sq ft) of landmines in Bosnia and Herzegovina in his honour.

Between 2002 and 2006, Livermore was Director General, Bureau of Security and Intelligence, in Foreign Affairs Canada. He retired from the Canadian foreign service in 2007.

He has published extensively in international relations and history. While at Queen's University in 1993–1994, he published a monograph, Human Rights in the New Europe. In 2018, he published "Detained: Islamic Fundamentalist Extremism and the War on Terror in Canada" with McGill-Queen's University Press, based in part on his extensive knowledge of issues relating to Canadians detained in the War on Terror in his last assignment in the Canadian government as director general for security and intelligence in Foreign Affairs Canada. In 2020, he published a Canadian history book, "wandering willie: The memoirs of William McDougall, 1822-1905, Canada's Forgotten Father of Confederation."

Livermore served for eight years as senior mentor at the Canadian Forces College in Toronto. He is currently an honorary senior fellow at the University of Ottawa's Graduate School of Public and International Affairs and is a senior visiting fellow at the Bill Graham Centre for Contemporary International History, Trinity College, University of Toronto. He is a member of the board of CANADEM, the Canadian NGO based in Ottawa. He has also served on the board of the Canadian Landmine Foundation and the Ottawa chapter of the Canadian Prostate Cancer network. He is currently co-president (with Gerald Cossette) of the Canadian Foreign Service Alumni Forum, a recently formed organization of former members of the Canadian foreign service. He publishes on Canadian foreign policy and does occasional blogs through the Centre for International Policy Studies (CIPS) at the University of Ottawa.
