= Falcon Virgo =

Series of exercises designed to test airspace security

Falcon Virgo is a series of exercises designed to test airspace security, especially around major American cities like New York City and Washington, D.C. They involve both regular military fighter aircraft and air operations centers (to include Air Force Reserve Command and Air National Guard) and Civil Air Patrol forces.

== Description ==
The exercises comprise a series of training flights held in coordination with the United States Northern Command / North American Air Defense Command (USNORTHCOM / NORAD), First Air Force (1 AF), the Federal Aviation Administration (FAA), the National Capital Region Command Center (NCRCC), the Joint Air Defense Operations Center (JADOC), the Continental US NORAD Region (CONR), the Civil Air Patrol (CAP), the U.S. Coast Guard and the CONR's various Air Defense Sectors.

One of the exercises implied the pilots from the Civil Air Patrol (CAP) who orchestrated fake aerial attacks on US cities, such as New York City and Washington DC, to stress-test Air Force and the Coast Guards.

The exercises are planned and controlled to ensure NORAD's rapid response capability. NORAD has conducted exercise flights of this nature throughout the U.S. and Canada since the start of Operation Noble Eagle, the command's response to the terrorist attacks on 11 September 2001.

== Exercises ==
- 09-07 - 15 to 19 May 2009
- 12-07 - 11 to 12 April 2012
- 15-13 - August 2015
