= René de Labarrière =

French Army officer (1899–1948)

René de Labarrière (28 January 1899 – 6 July 1948) was a French army officer, considered to be the first United Nations soldier killed in action. He died in Palestine after driving over a land mine.

On 6 October 1998 he was honoured by Kofi Annan in the UN's headquarters in New York City, posthumously receiving the second Dag Hammarskjöld medal.
