= Canopy =

Canopy may refer to:

== Plants ==
- Canopy (botany), aboveground portion of plant community or crop (including forests)
- Canopy (grape), aboveground portion of grapes

== Religion and ceremonies ==
- Baldachin or canopy of state, typically placed over an altar or throne
- Chuppah, a canopy used in Jewish wedding ceremonies
- Umbraculum, a canopy awarded by the pope to basilicas
- Vapor canopy, a creationist idea that earth was surrounded by a "canopy" of water

== As a proper name ==
=== Transportation ===
- Canopy (aircraft), transparent enclosure over aircraft cockpit
- Camper shell, or canopy, a raised, rigid covering for the rear bed of a pickup truck
- Honda Canopy, a three-wheeled automobile from Honda

=== Brands and organizations ===
- Canopy (hotel), a brand within the corporate structure of Hilton Worldwide
- Canopy Biosciences, American biotechnology company
- Canopy Group, U.S. investment firm
- OP Canopy, Canadian Forces Operation

=== Computing ===
- Enthought Canopy, a Python distribution and analysis environment for scientific and analytic computing
- Motorola Canopy, wireless networking system

=== Other uses ===
- Canopy (film), a 2013 Australian war film

== Other uses ==
- Canopy (architecture), overhead roof or structure that provides shade or other shelter
- Canopy (parachute), cloth and suspension line portion of parachute
- Canopy bed, a type of bed
- Vehicle canopy, type of overhead door for vehicle
- Truck canopy

== See also ==
- Canapé, a small decorative food item
- Kanopy, an on-demand streaming video platform for public libraries and universities
- Mantle and pavilion (heraldry), elements in some coats of arms resembling a canopy of state
