= Buffalo 461 =

Canadian military plane

Coordinates: 35°N 38°E

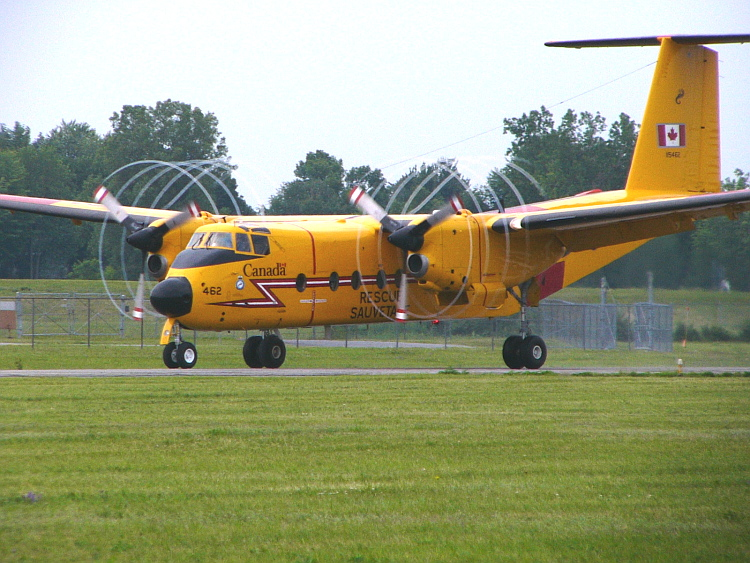
- A similar de Havilland Canada CC-115.

Incident
- Date: 9 August 1974
- Summary: Shot down by missiles
- Site: Ad Dimas, Syria

Aircraft
- Aircraft type: de Havilland Canada DHC-5 Buffalo
- Operator: Canadian Forces
- Registration: 115461
- Flight origin: Beirut International Airport, Lebanon
- Destination: Damascus, Syria
- Passengers: 4
- Crew: 5
- Fatalities: 9
- Injuries: 0
- Survivors: 0

Buffalo 461 was a Canadian military de Havilland Canada DHC-5 Buffalo assigned to the second United Nations Emergency Force force in Syria in support of United Nations Security Council Resolution 340. Assigned to a peacekeeping force, Buffalo 461 was shot down by three Syrian missiles on August 9, 1974, killing all nine passengers and crew.

The loss of Buffalo 461 remains the largest single-incident loss of life in the history of Canadian peacekeeping operations.

== Flight 51 ==
The second United Nations Emergency Force was authorized by the United Nations Security Council to supervise the ceasefire between Egypt and Israel following the end of the Yom Kippur War. Besides preventing additional flare-ups of fighting, the peacekeeping force was also tasked with assisting the Red Cross with humanitarian efforts in the region. Canada was a leader in these peacekeeping efforts and was providing logistics, signals and air and service units. Their three Buffalo aircraft were flying six-day-a-week schedules.

Flight 51 was Buffalo 461's last flight designation, for a routine scheduled supply trip from Ismailia, Egypt to Damascus, Syria. Five crew members and four military passengers were on board when the aircraft took off from Beirut International Airport after a stopover. The First Officer, Captain Keith Mirau, received clearance to enter Syrian airspace from the Damascus air traffic control centre at 0945 GMT. Shortly after crossing from Lebanon into Syria the plane was hit by a surface-to-air missile launched from a Syrian airfield. Moments later two more missiles struck and destroyed the plane, scattering wreckage across a field near the Syrian town of Ad Dimas. All nine on board were killed.

== Aircraft ==
The aircraft, the 16th Buffalo built, first flown in 1968, was a twin-engined de Havilland Canada DHC-5 Buffalo (CC-115 – Canadian military designation) utility transport with Canadian military serial number 115461.

== Aftermath and legacy ==
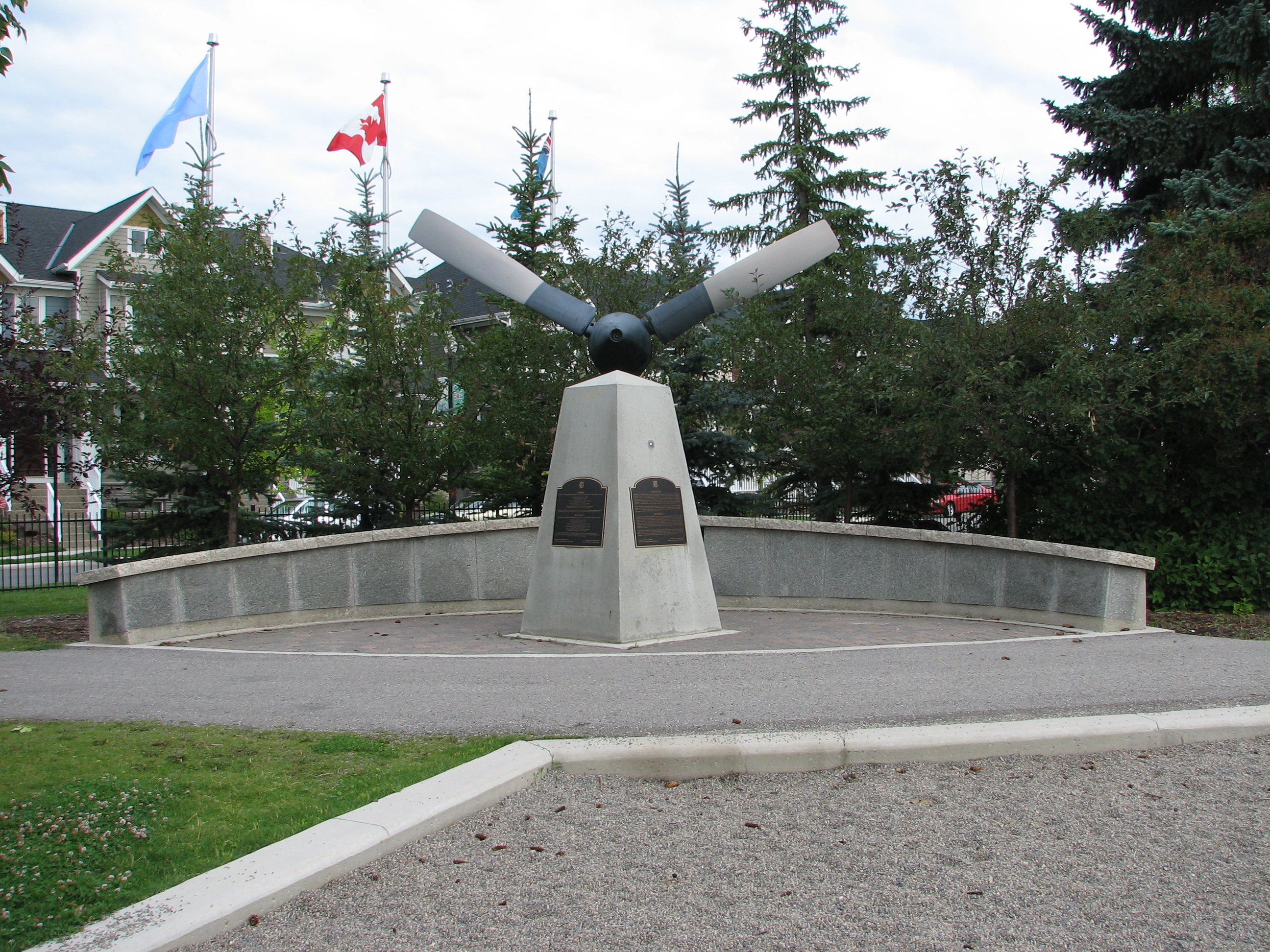
Monument to the "Buffalo Nine" in Calgary.

The Canadian Department of National Defence launched a board of Inquiry to investigate the loss of Buffalo 461. The board was led by LCol J.A. Cann who was unable to determine if the missile attack was accidental or done intentionally to put pressure on the United Nations to curtail Israeli flights over Syrian airspace.

The Canadian Warplane Heritage Museum has undertaken a project to rebuild an ex-Sudanese Air Force DHC-5D to represent Buffalo 461 as a tribute to those lost on Buffalo 461 and all Canadian peacekeepers.

In 1993 British Columbia established August 9 as Peacekeepers' Day and this was recognized nationally in 2008 by the Canadian government.

A fragment of the original aircraft is on display at the Canadian War Museum as a memorial to the lost crew members and passengers, who have become known as the Buffalo Nine, and a memorial has also been erected at Buffalo Park in Calgary, Alberta.

== See also ==
- Canadian peacekeeping
- International Day of United Nations Peacekeepers
