= Dag Hammarskjöld Medal =

Posthumous award given by the UN

The Dag Hammarskjöld Medal is a posthumous award given by the United Nations (UN) to military personnel, police, or civilians who lose their lives while serving in a United Nations peacekeeping operation. The medal is named after Dag Hammarskjöld, the second Secretary-General of the United Nations, who died in a plane crash in what is now Zambia in September 1961.

== Creation of medal ==
On 22 July 1997, during its 3802nd meeting, the United Nations Security Council unanimously adopted Resolution 1121, in which it established the Dag Hammarskjöld Medal. In the resolution, the Security Council also requested that the UN Secretary-General establish criteria and procedures for the awarding of the medal. The first medals were awarded in October 1998.

== Criteria ==
On 1 December 2000, Kofi Annan, the UN Secretary-General, published regulations for the awarding of the medal. The award is given to any military personnel, police, or civilians who lose their lives while serving in a United Nations peacekeeping operation, so long as the death did not result from misconduct or criminal acts. The criteria came into force on 1 January 2001 and the medal may be given to individuals who qualified before or after that date. The physical medals are presented to the next of kin of the deceased recipient.

== Medal ==
The medal is egg-shaped and made of clear lead free glass, engraved with the name and date of death of the recipient, the United Nations logo, and the inscription "The Dag Hammarskjöld Medal. In the Service of Peace", in English and French.

== Recipients ==
On 6 October 1998, the first three Dag Hammarskjöld Medals were awarded to Hammarskjöld himself, René de Labarrière (killed by a land mine in Palestine in July 1948), and Folke Bernadotte (assassinated in Jerusalem by Jewish extremists in September 1948). Beginning in 2001, the UN began awarding dozens of medals each month for the UN peacekeepers who had been killed between 1948 and 2001. Since 2001, there have been annual medal ceremonies for those who were killed in UN peacekeeping operations the previous year. The ceremony is held on 29 May, which is the International Day of United Nations Peacekeepers.

In 2009, the medal was awarded to each of the 132 UN peacekeepers who were killed in 2008.

Pakistani peacekeeper Naik Naeem Raza, who served the United Nations peacekeeping mission in the Democratic Republic of the Congo and was killed in January 2018, was on 25 May 2019 posthumously awarded a UN medal by Secretary General António Guterres. Raza had died during an ambush on a UN Convoy in January 2018, according to a press release by the Inter-Services Public Relations (ISPR), the military's media wing.

"The medal is awarded to blue helmets for their supreme sacrifice in the line of duty," read the statement issued by the military's mouthpiece.

According to the press release, 156 Pakistan peacekeepers have so far laid down their lives for global peace and stability.

In 2019, Indian officer Jitendra Kumar and 119 men and women were posthumously awarded the medal for their courage and sacrifice in the line of duty. Kumar laid down his life while serving in the UN Organisation Stabilization Mission in the Democratic Republic of the Congo.
