= International Day of United Nations Peacekeepers =

Annual tribute to United Nations Peacekeeping personnel

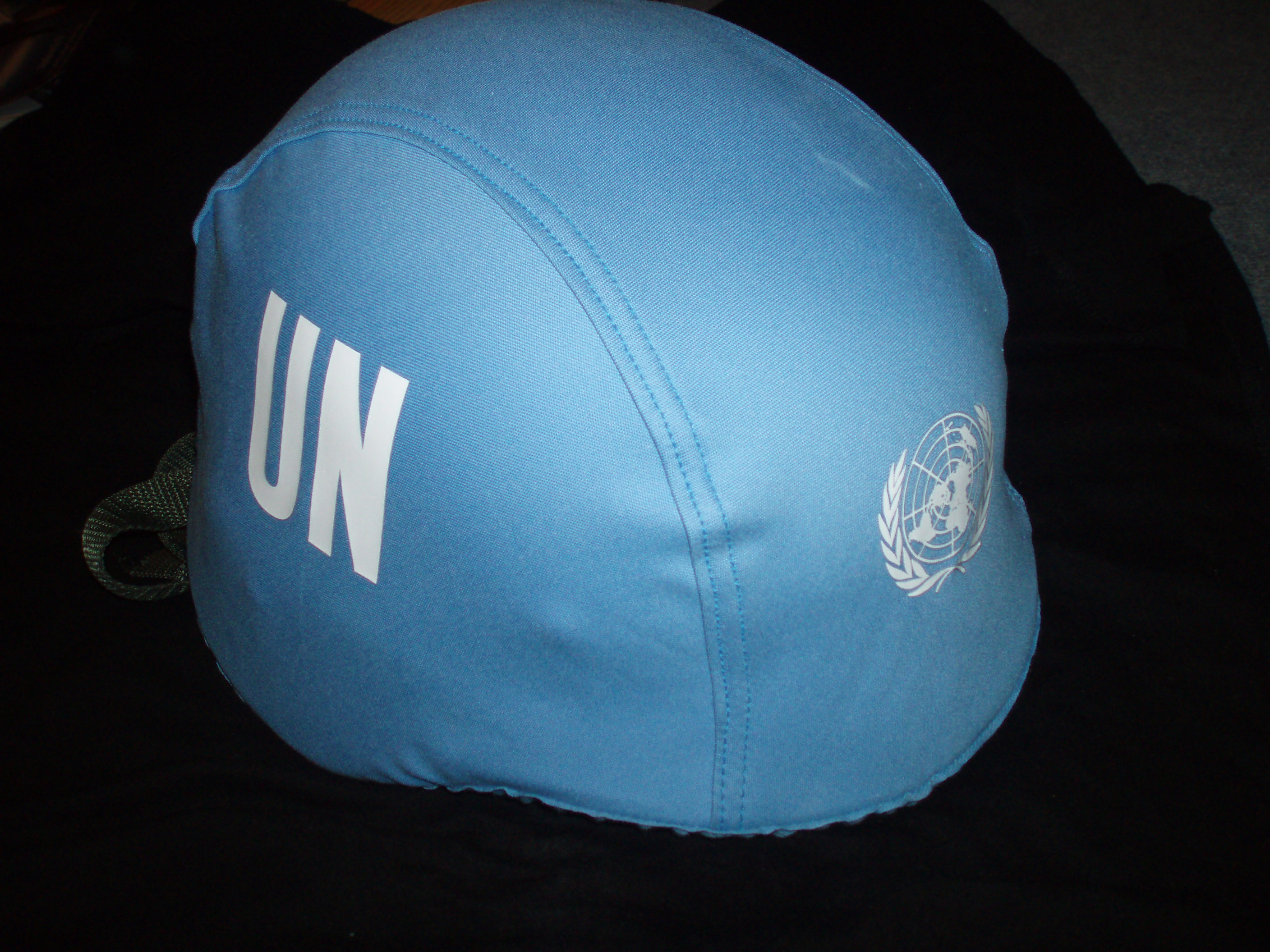
- The UN Blue Helmet
- Observed by: United Nations personnel and internationally
- Significance: Commemorates sacrifice made by UN personnel on peacekeeping missions.
- Celebrations: Presentation of Dag Hammarskjöld Medal
- Date: 29 May
- Next time: 29 May 2027
- Frequency: Annual

The International Day of United Nations Peacekeepers is an international day, held annually on 29 May to pay tribute to the men and women who have served and continue to serve in United Nations peacekeeping operations for their professionalism, dedication and courage, and to honour the memory of those who have lost their lives in the cause of peace.

== Creation ==
It was so designated by United Nations General Assembly Resolution 57/129, adopted on 11 December 2002 during the 57th regular session, after an official request of the Ukrainian Peacekeepers Association and the Government of Ukraine to the UN General Assembly, and was first celebrated in 2003. The date, 29 May, marks the anniversary of the creation of the United Nations Truce Supervision Organization (UNTSO) in 1948 to monitor the ceasefire after the 1948 Arab-Israeli War, which was the first ever UN peacekeeping mission.

== Commemoration ==
The day is marked at the United Nations Headquarters in New York City with the presentation of the Dag Hammarskjöld Medal posthumously honouring fallen peacekeepers, statements by the President of the General Assembly and the Secretary-General, as well as a press release regarding the state of UN peacekeeping missions and the continued necessity of their work.

There are also observances around the world; often countries will honour their own peacekeepers abroad, but the UN also organizes festivals, discussion forums, and memorials in cooperation with local and national groups.

In 2009, the UN put a special focus on the role of and need for women in peacekeeping, both as role models and also to serve in a number of gender-specific capacities.

National Peacekeepers' Day is commemorated in Canada on 9 August. The day was chosen to recognize the greatest single loss of Canadian lives in a peacekeeping mission, when in 1974 nine Canadian peacekeepers were killed when their plane was shot down in Syria.

== See also ==
- Media related to International Day of United Nations Peacekeepers at Wikimedia Commons
- Attacks on humanitarian workers
- International Day of Peace
- Veterans Day (Sweden), held on the same day
