= Operation Noble Eagle =

Military operation in response to 9/11

- Part of the Home Front of the Global War on Terrorism
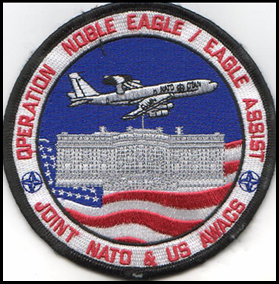
- Joint NATO and U.S. AWACS service badge for Noble Eagle & Eagle Assist.
- Location: United States and Canada
- Objective: Homeland security
- Date: 11 September 2001 – present
- Executed by: United States; Canada
- Outcome: Ongoing

Operation Noble Eagle (ONE) is the United States and Canadian military operation related to homeland security and support to federal, state, and local agencies. The operation began on 11 September 2001, in response to the September 11 attacks.

== History ==
Operation Noble Eagle began with the mobilization of thousands of National Guard and reserve personnel to perform security missions on military installations, airports and other potential targets such as bridges, power plants, and port facilities. These reservists were called to active duty under a mobilization authority known as a partial mobilization (10 USC 12302). In a time of national emergency declared by the President of the United States, partial mobilization authorizes the President to order members of the ready reserve to active duty for a period not to exceed 24 consecutive months. Additionally, in 2001 and 2002, thousands of members of the National Guard were activated at the order of their respective governors to provide additional security at airports. They were called up under Title 32 of the U.S. Code, which means they were under state control, but with federal pay and benefits. The Royal Canadian Air Force assisted in providing defense of the northern border of the United States. The United States Army's 759th Military Police Battalion, 144th Military Police Company and the 177th Military Police Brigade were assigned the task of protecting the White House, the Pentagon and the Capitol, along with other Army National Guard units that were tasked with augmenting the U.S. Air Force (USAF) air defense perimeter around the National Capital Region.

=== Requirement ===
In an article dated June 2007 United States civilian and military leaders began to regard the costly air defense operation above North American cities as a permanent defense requirement demanding significant attention from North American Aerospace Defense Command (NORAD). The current focus is on improving command and control of the homeland air defense missions.

== Equipment ==
The United States Department of Defense provided F-15 Eagles and F-16 Fighting Falcons to this operation, and the Canadian Forces provided CF-18 Hornets. The US Army National Guard provided AN/TWQ-1 Avenger short range air defense systems to provide close range air defense protection under the control of the USAF Joint Air Defense Operations Center (JADOC) and CONR.

The JADOC Suite is an integrated USAF connectivity center used in point defense of the National Capital Region. The Suite provides capability for tactical C2 execution for the Joint Task Force/Joint Forces Air Component Commander (JTF/JFACC) under the Operation Noble Eagle (ONE) mission as part of the National Capital Region-Integrated Air Defense System (NCR-IADS - National Capital Region Integrated Air Defense Systems). It is currently fielded and operational. It was developed in response to an urgent need request for enhanced air defense of the NCR per SECDEF direction through a joint rapid acquisition cell. The architecture consists of an air surveillance fusion system and the C2 connectivity center, which includes a Link 16 capable terminal and Situational Awareness Data Link (SADL) capability.

== Canadian NORAD Region ==
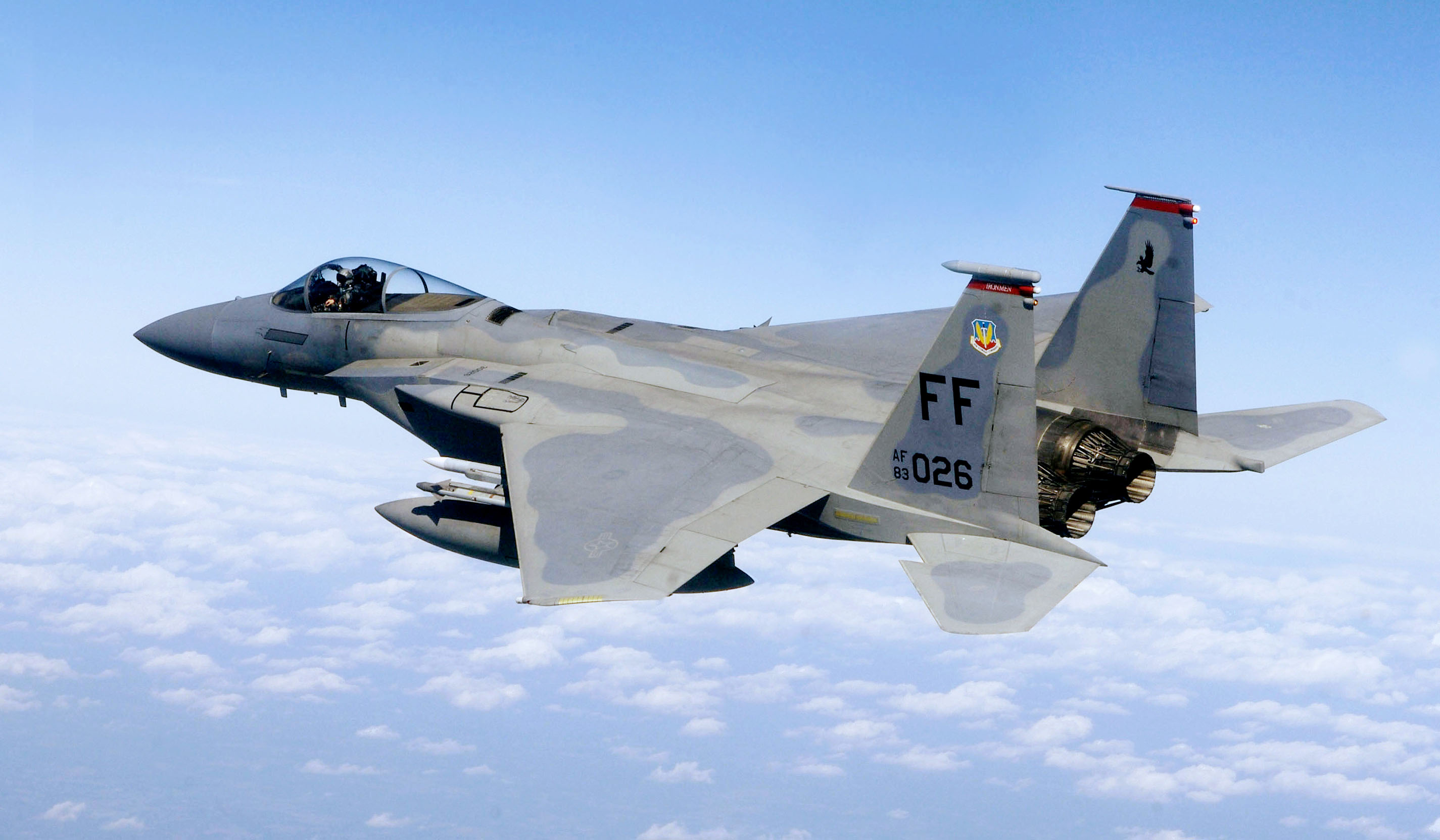
An F-15 Eagle pilot assigned to the 71st Fighter Squadron flies a combat air patrol mission.

As the Canadian geographical component of NORAD, CANR provides airspace surveillance and control, and directs all air sovereignty activities for the Canadian NORAD Region. CANR and its assigned Royal Canadian Air Force assets throughout the country ensure air safety and security against potential air threats and have supported special events such as the G-8 Summit and the visits of foreign dignitaries.

The Canadian NORAD Region flew Operation Noble Eagle air defense protection missions in the Windsor, Ontario/Detroit, Michigan area on 5 February 2006, in support of Super Bowl XL at Ford Field. These types of missions had become more common at organized entertainment such as the Super Bowl.

== See also ==
- Operation Eagle Assist
- Operation Enduring Freedom
- Falcon Virgo
- JLENS
