= Operation Echo =

Part of the Kosovo War in 1999

- Part of the Kosovo War
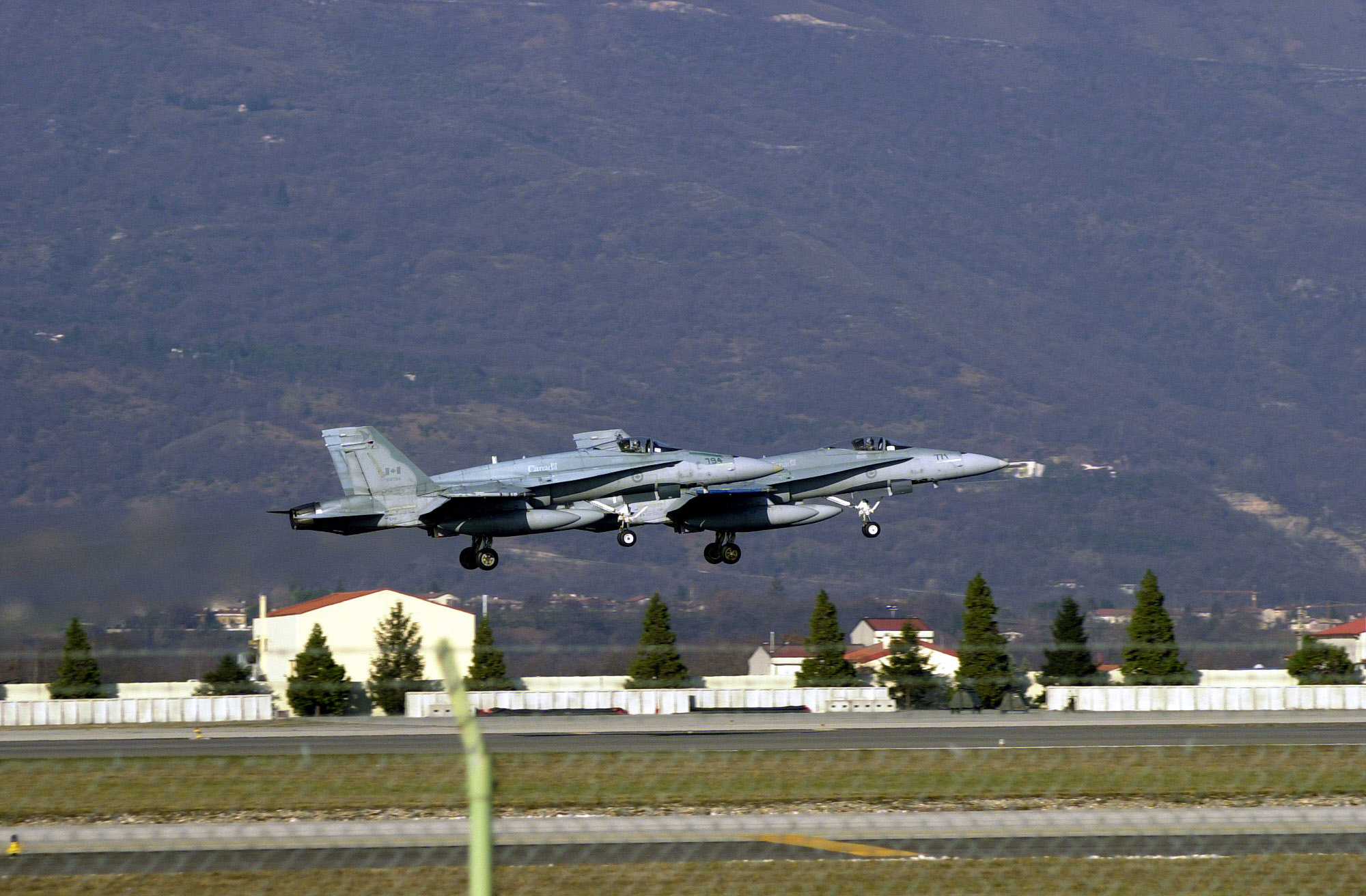
- CF-18 Hornets depart Aviano Air Base, Italy
Date	1999
Location	Kosovo, Yugoslavia

Belligerents
Canada	Yugoslavia

Commanders and leaders
Jean Chrétien	Slobodan Milošević

Units involved
Air Command	Yugoslav Armed Forces

Operation Echo was the codename given by the Canadian Forces for its air activities during the Kosovo War in 1999. In support of the NATO Operation Allied Force Canadian aircraft based at Aviano Air Base in northeastern Italy flew bombing missions over the Balkans.

During the campaign the Canadian air contingent consisted of 18 CF-18 Hornet aircraft from 441 and 425 Tactical Fighter Squadrons, with 69 aircrew and 250 ground crew. 945 sorties were originally planned, however 176 were cancelled due to weather, 85 were cancelled due to "operational factors" and 6 were cancelled due to maintenance issues. 678 sorties went ahead, with 120 combat air patrols and 558 ground attacks. Bombs were dropped during 224 of them, totalling nearly 500,000 lb (230,000 kg) of gravity and precision-guided bombs, which hit their targets 70% of the time. While Canadian forces comprised less than 2% of the nearly 1,000 Allied aircraft engaged in the conflict, they flew on 10% of all bombing missions.

== See also ==
- Operation Kinetic (1999)
- List of Canadian military operations
