= Canadian Association of Veterans in United Nations Peacekeeping =

- Abbreviation: CAVUNP
- Type: Association of Veterans
- Legal status: active
- Purpose: advocate and public voice, educator and network
- Headquarters: Ottawa, Ontario
- Location: 23 chapters in Canada
- Region served: Canada
- Members: 1000 members
- Official language: English; French
- Website: www.cavunp.org

The Canadian Association of Veterans in United Nations Peacekeeping (French: l'Association canadiennne des vétérans gardiens de la paix pour les Nations Unies) is a Canadian non-political association of members who have been involved in peacekeeping work for the United Nations. It has more than 1000 members and 23 chapters in Canada.

The association was first planned in January 1986, and permission to officially use the terms "United Nations" and "Canada" were received by 1989.

The association's president is Colonel Donald Stewart Ethell, a member of the Alberta Order of Excellence and former peacekeeper.

The association campaigned to make 9 August "Peacekeeping Day". This was adopted nationally in Canada in June 2008.
