= Operation Peregrine =

Operation PEREGRINE was a domestic Canadian military operation that took place between August 3 and September 16, 2003.

In early August 2003, British Columbia was overwhelmed by over 800 separate forest fires. Provincial fire services were stretched to the breaking point, and tens of thousands of people were forced to evacuate their homes. After responding to a severe interface fire in Barriere BC, the provincial government requested federal aid, which was initially provided by B Company, 1 PPCLI from Edmonton. The province followed up with multiple requests as the fire situation grew more desperate and, ultimately, over 2,200 Canadian Forces (CF) personnel were mobilized. After receiving a day of basic forest firefighting training from the British Columbia Forest Service, including safety procedures, fire ratings, hose handling, and fire behaviour, the soldiers took to the fire lines. At the operation's height, deployed soldiers were divided into five task forces - Task Force One based in Barriere, Task Force Two based in Kelowna, and others in Nakusp, Okanagan Falls, and Chase BC. The logistics hub and operational headquarters (the latter based on Land Force Western Area HQ) were located in Vernon BC.

The operation lasted 45 days, and at its height more than 2,600 military personnel were in action. In terms of deployed forces at the time, it surpassed in numbers any Canadian Forces operation overseas.

It was the CF's third-largest recent domestic operation, after Operation RECUPERATION in response to the 1998 ice storm in Southern Ontario and Quebec, and Operation ASSISTANCE in response to the 1997 Red River flood.

== Deployed Canadian Forces units ==
- 1st Regiment, Royal Canadian Horse Artillery
- Lord Strathcona's Horse (Royal Canadians)
- 1st Battalion, Princess Patricia's Canadian Light Infantry
- 15 Engineer Squadron, 1 Combat Engineer Regiment
- 39 Canadian Brigade Group (All Canadian Army Primary Reserve units in British Columbia)
- 417 Combat Support and SAR Squadron
- 408 Tactical Helicopter Squadron
- 38 Canadian Brigade Group Primary Reserve
- CFB Esquimalt Naval Task Force (for ground operations)
- CFB Cold Lake Air Task Force (for ground operations)
- 1 Service Battalion
- 1 Field Ambulance
- 11 Field Ambulance
- 12 Field Ambulance
- 15 Field Ambulance
- 1 General Support Battalion (now disbanded)
- Land Force Western Area Headquarters (now 3rd Canadian Division HQ)
- 742 Communications Squadron

As was normal for CF operations, individual augmentees from other units was normal; for example large numbers of reservists from 41 Canadian Brigade Group were deployed under the operational control of the units and formations listed above.

== Decorations ==
Major Richard Erland, was awarded the Meritorious Service Medal (MSM) for his service during the operation. His citation reads:

In August 2003, Maj Erland, then Capt, served with tireless dedication during the City of Kelowna firestorm and follow-up periods of threat to the city. As the Operation PEREGRINE Task Force 2 operations officer, he displayed outstanding leadership and provided inspiration throughout the demanding operation. Maj Erland's organizational abilities and professional conduct during a highly stressful period were instrumental in maintaining a sense of balance in the face of chaos, and reflected highly on the Canadian Forces and on Canada.

== See also ==
- List of Canadian military operations
- 2003 Okanagan Mountain Park Fire
