= Operation Driftnet =

- Part of the Efforts to control driftnetting
Date	1993 – present
Location	North Pacific Ocean
Status	Ongoing

Belligerents
- Canada

Commanders and leaders
Lieutenant General Stuart Beare	Unknown commander

Strength
long-range patrol squadrons of the Royal Canadian Air Force and their CP-140 Aurora maritime patrol aircraft	Unknown

Operation DRIFTNET is the Canadian Armed Forces operation conducted in support of Fisheries and Oceans Canada (DFO). It delivers Canada's participation in multinational efforts to control driftnetting and other forms of illegal, unregulated and unreported fishing in the North Pacific Ocean. Operation DRIFTNET is conducted under a Memorandum of Understanding between DFO and the Department of National Defence.

== History ==
The first patrols of Operation DRIFTNET were flown in 1993.

Fishing in the international waters of the Pacific Ocean was not regulated until 1952, when the International Convention for the High-Seas Fisheries of the North Pacific came into force under the aegis of the United Nations. By 1989, driftnet fishing was so common that up to 2 million square miles of nets were set each year. Between 1989 and 1991, the U.N. General Assembly made three increasingly stringent resolutions on driftnet fishing. The last of the series, Resolution 46/215 of 20 December 1991, called on all members of the international community to implement a global moratorium on large-scale pelagic driftnet fishing in international waters by 31 December 1992.

In 1992, the Convention for the Conservation of Anadromous Stocks in the North Pacific Ocean replaced the International Convention for the High Seas Fisheries of the North Pacific and established the North Pacific Anadromous Fish Commission (NPAFC). Canada, Japan, the Russian Federation and the United States are charter members of the NPAFC; the Republic of Korea joined as a full member in 2003, and the People's Republic of China became a non-member supporter in 2006. Member nations of the NPAFC work to detect and apprehend vessels involved in illegal, unreported and unregulated fishing in the North Pacific.

== The Task Force ==
The task force deployed on Operation DRIFTNET is made up from the long-range patrol squadrons of the Royal Canadian Air Force and their CP-140 Aurora maritime patrol aircraft, under operational command and control of the Joint Force Air Component Commander in Winnipeg, Manitoba.

Flying with CP-140 Aurora crews from the municipal airport in Hakodate, on Japan's northern island of Hokkaido, DFO Fishery Officers conduct surveillance patrols over the high-threat zone in the international waters of the North Pacific Ocean. Using the Aurora's enhanced electronic sensor suite, the Fishery Officers and the Aurora sensor operators look for signs of illegal fishing and activity, and gather imagery for use as evidence in enforcement action.

Operation DRIFTNET is supported by the Canadian Armed Forces Polar Epsilon project, which provides RADARSAT-2 satellite imagery.

== Mission ==
Operation DRIFTNET is an important component of Canada's contribution to the NPAFC. More than four million square kilometres of the North Pacific Ocean are monitored every year, with patrols taking place throughout spring, summer and fall. When illegal activity by a vessel is confirmed by a patrol, the ship's flag is identified and the vessel's nation is responsible for prosecuting the violator.

Operation DRIFTNET patrols also deter potential illegal fishing activity, due to their presence.
