= Operation Snowgoose =

Canadian involvement in the UN peacekeeping mission in Cyprus

Operation SNOWGOOSE
- Part of the United Nations Peacekeeping Force in Cyprus
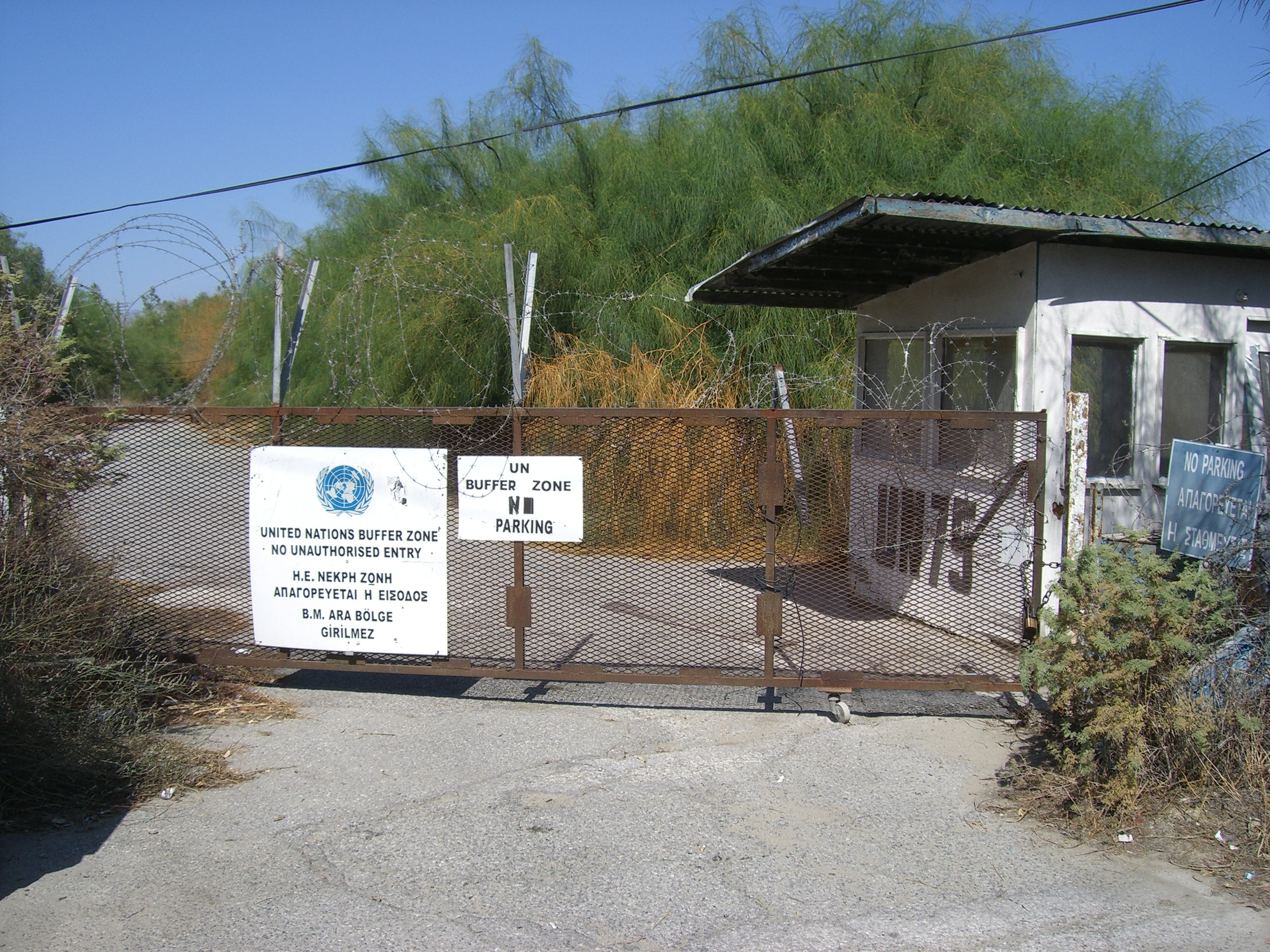
- UN Buffer Zone in Nicosia
| Date | 1964 - Present |
| Location | Cyprus |
| Result | Buffer Zone established |

Belligerents
| Greek Cypriot | UNFICYP: Canada; Finland; Ireland; Sweden | Turkish Cypriot |

Operation Snowgoose is the Canadian involvement in the UN peacekeeping mission in Cyprus (UNFICYP). This operation was established in 1964 alongside the UN peacekeeping mission in Cyprus with the goal of reducing tensions between the Greek Cypriot and Turkish Cypriot populations on the island. Canada's participation with UNFICYP was named "Snowgoose" in 1974, and has one of the longest durations of any Canadian peacekeeping operation. Over 33,000 Canadians have served since the beginning of this mission, but currently only one Canadian participates in the operation per year.

== Background ==
The island of Cyprus has been occupied by various invading groups over the centuries, and as a result, contains a mix of different cultures. The population is largely Greek, but with a sizeable Turkish minority. The presence of this Turkish population is due to the historical influence of the Ottoman Empire, which the island was a part of for nearly 340 years until 1919.

=== History ===
The Cyprus dispute originated from tensions between the two separate cultural groups inhabiting the island. What some historians refer to as the “Cyprus problem” has been a source of conflict for several decades. Since 1955, repeated clashes between the island’s Greek and Turkish communities have created political instability. Cyprus is placed in an advantageous position in between the Middle East and Europe, making it an ideal base for the strategic power in the region. Though the population of Cyprus is composed of mostly Greek and Turkish communities, the Greeks are considered to be the “dominant cultural influence.” In a 1960 census, the population was 77% Greek and 18% Turkish. From the Turks’ arrival during the Ottoman Conquest in 1571, until 1974, both groups were interspersed throughout the island, though remaining socially distinct.

The British annexed Cyprus after the fall of the Ottoman Empire following WWI, and during this occupation, the Greek movement for national self-determination began a campaign for enosis, or union with Greece. The campaign for enosis created tensions between the Greek and Turkish communities. There were suspicions that Greece itself might be supporting the more violent aspects of the movement, and retaliation from the Turks resulted in the escalation of this violence.

Cyprus eventually gained independence in 1960 through the Zurich-London Agreement. This agreement created a new Cypriot government in an attempt to serve the interests of both communities. However, after taking power the Cypriot president proposed 13 constitutional changes, which were perceived as attempts to reduce the political power of the Turkish community. Tensions increased, erupting in violence in December 1963.

=== Beginnings of crisis ===
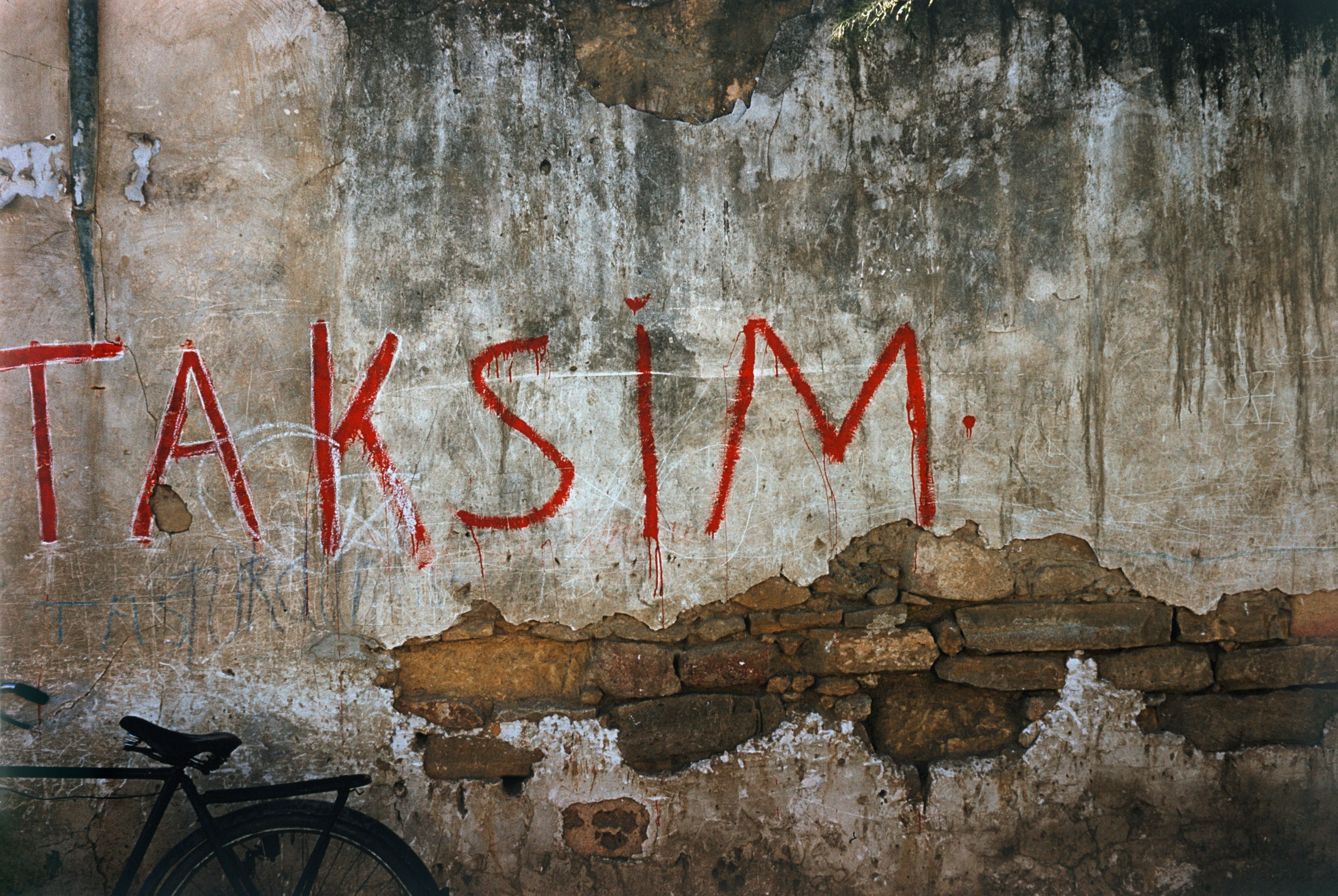
Taksim graffiti in Nicosia late 1950s

The Greek Cypriot political leadership’s fundamental objective during this time was enosis, or union with Greece. Prior to 1960, this movement led to the spreading of nationalist ideology through the Church, putting pressure on the British colonial government. The tensions of the colonial period allowed for the rise of two guerrilla movements, which each called for Cyprus’ independence and joining with the nationality that each group identified with. The Greek-Cypriot-aligned organization became known as EOKA, the Ethnic Organosis Kypriou Agoniston, or the National Organization of Cypriot Fighters. They engaged in an armed struggle for enosis with Greece. A counterpart organization soon arose: the TMT, Turk Mukavamet Teskilati, or the Turkish Resistance Organization. The TMT demanded Taksim, or the partition of the island between Greece and Turkey, and looked to Turkey for protection against the threat of Greek domination.

=== Constitutional changes ===
Eventually these violent outbursts abated and the Greek and Turkish foreign ministers presented an “agreed constitutional framework” to the UN in 1959. One scholar characterized this new constitutional framework as, “an elaborate and inflexible code, designed to accommodate inter communal differences by sharing power between the communities and institutionalizing ethnic differences within the political system.” In the new system, the President was elected by the Greek-Cypriot population, and the Vice-President was elected by the Turkish-Cypriot population. Each had veto power, but both communities worked together in the legislative assembly.

At the same time, international efforts were implemented to ensure the stability of this new state. The Treaty of Guarantee authorized Britain, Greece and Turkey (known as “guarantor powers”) to take joint action to restore constitutional order if the situation arose.

Two further treaties established foreign military operations within Cyprus. The Treaty of Establishment transferred 99 square miles to British sovereignty, and gave Britain the rights to occupy a number of sites throughout the island. The Treaty of Alliance established tripartite military headquarters for the Greek, Turkish and Cypriot forces.

== UN mission ==
Rather than guaranteeing peace, the treaty system led to the effective breakdown of constitutional order. It gave Turkish community exceptional minority rights to defend against encroachment by Greek leadership, and the Greeks felt that it failed to achieve enosis. The constitutional crisis incited outbreaks of inter-communal violence, which broke out just before the end of 1963. British troops intervened, established a “green line” to divide the capital, developing into a UN peacekeeping mission (UNFICYP)

On March 4, 1964 the UN Security Council approved resolution 186, creating the UNFICYP, which had a mandate to “prevent a recurrence of fighting, and, as necessary, to contribute to the maintenance and restoration of law and order and a return to normal conditions.”

The situation continued to deteriorate, as troops from Canada, Ireland, Finland, and Sweden arrived to participate in the UN mission. By June 1964, UNFICYP reached a strength of 6,411. Troops were deployed alongside internationally-sourced civilian police, with distribution of troops based on the intensity of violence within the region. Forces were deployed between defensive lines, or in areas where fighting was likely to occur. Observation posts were set up, with mobile patrols covering the spaces between them. Canadian and Finnish contingents were deployed to the Nicosia zone, which included Cyprus’ capital, Nicosia, and surrounding areas from the northeast to northwest of the city.

=== 1974 Cypriot coup ===
The UN mission put an end to major violence, but could not resolve the underlying tensions as inter-communal talks continued to struggle. The violence continued through 1964, dividing the island into enclaves as both Greek and Turkish governments supported and supplied their respective sides of the conflict. Enosis began to be seen as impractical, under the assumption that “union with Greece would inevitably mean war with Turkey" as the military dictatorship in Athens opposed independent Cypriot efforts to resolve the conflict through inter communal talks. This culminated in a coup in July 1974 by the Greek-led Cypriot National Guard. On July 20, Turkish troops landed on the island, with the Turkish government invoking the treaty of Guarantee, which permitted the three guaranteeing powers to intervene in the case of a constitutional crisis. Several ceasefires were attempted, but failed, while UNFICYP forces attempted to protect civilians and evacuate foreign missions. When a ceasefire was finally declared by Turkish forces, the UNFICYP quickly established disengagement zones between the opposing forces, stretching across the island.

Some 3,500 died during this crisis, which also displaced 180,000 Greek-Cypriots in the north. The UN established a buffer zone on the island, separating ethnically distinct areas. Peace talks between the two communities continued to struggle until the Turkish-Cypriot leader broke off the talks and declared the independence of the Turkish Republic of North Cyprus in 1983. The UN mission continues to the present day, maintaining the security of the buffer zones and ensuring the safety of both communities.

== Canadian involvement ==
On 4 March 1964, Security Council Resolution 186 was approved by the UN Security Council. This decision established the United Nations Peacekeeping Force in Cyprus (UNFICYP). Following the decision, the Canadian government, under Prime Minister Lester B. Pearson, approved the commitment of the Canadian troops on 13 March 1964. The primary contingent was formed with 709 personnel from the Royal 22^{e} Régiment (Vandoos) and 91 personnel from the Royal Canadian Dragoons. For the deployment of the soldiers and equipment, the aircraft carrier HMCS Bonaventure was loaded with 56 vehicles, 70 tons of stores and ammunition, and 95 men from the Vandoos, the Royal Canadian Dragoons, and the Royal Canadian Army Service Corps. Bonaventure left Halifax, Canada, on 18 March 1964, and arrived in Famagusta Bay, Cyprus, on March 30. Following the aircraft deployment, the Royal Canadian Air Force also prepared and dispatched Hercules and Yukon aircraft of Nos. 435 and 437 Squadrons. The air force transported about 900 soldiers and 400 tons of equipment between 15 March and 22 March.

On 4 April 1964, UNFICYP was formed at Nicosia, the capital of Cyprus. The peace-keeping operation initially began with troops from Ireland, Finland, Denmark, and Canada. The Canadian and Finnish contingents were deployed to the United Nations Buffer Zone in Cyprus, which included Nicosia and the surrounding northeast and northwest areas. The Canadian operation’s goal was to oversee and maintain the neutrality of the Green Line, the demarcation zone between the Greek and Turkish Cypriot communities within the city. The Canadian peacekeeping operation was titled “Operation Snowgoose” in July 1974 when the Canadian involvement increased during the Turkish invasion of Cyprus.

The Canadian force was originally composed of around 1,100 personnel, but this number was reduced to 900 by November 1967 and then further to 480 in 1974. After 1974, the number of Canadian contingent personnel in Cyprus gradually reduced, falling to 520 in December 1992. On 15 June 1993, the Canadian contingent relinquished control to Britain, and by then, there were only 117 Canadians left on the ground.

Between 1964 and 1993, the Canadian government deployed 59 groups, approximately 25,000 Canadian Armed Forces, as a part of the Operation Snowgoose and UNFICYP. More than 33,000 Canadians have served in Cyprus and there were 28 casualties during the operation. Currently only one or two Canadian soldiers remain in Cyprus as part of UNFICYP.

== Controversies ==
Opinions remain mixed regarding Canada’s participation in peacekeeping in Cyprus. Some Canadians view the peacekeeping mission as a success, and take pride in the Canadian soldiers who served and risked their lives whilst maintaining their professional reputation. On the other hand, during the summer of 1974 that Canada had been contributing peacekeepers to three separate missions, it has been argued that the lack of information of the overall conflict or even the local situation itself was a key factor in slowing the success of the mission, leading to the mistreatment of civilians within Cyprus. There is a lack of understanding when it comes to what is expected from a UN mission, let alone what is expected of a peacekeeper. Missions are a way to achieve aims and not per se end the conflict in which they have inserted themselves. Not only that but for some, the Canadian mission in Cyprus is seen as more of an intrusion, instead of an intervention in which aid was provided.

== Present day ==
As of 2019, it has been estimated that more than 33,000 Canadians have served in Operation Snowgoose. There have been twenty-eight casualties during the course of the operation, including Private JJC Berger and Private JLG Perron, who were killed in the 1974 Coup.

Currently, one Canadian is stationed at the UNFICYP headquarters in Nicosia each year. The Canadian that is sent has multiple responsibilities, including supporting the UNFICYP operations personnel, and assisting in operations and logistics, such as information management. They also aim to create peace between the Greek and Turkish groups in Cyprus, thereby upholding the UN mandate. To this end, they continue the attempt to protect the buffer zone between the Turkish-occupied side of the island and the Republic of Cyprus. Canadian personnel also advocate for increased negotiations between the two ethnic groups, as well as investigate possible infractions regarding the ceasefire arrangement. Besides these responsibilities, they also can get involved in humanitarian activities.

== See also ==
- UN peacekeeping mission in Cyprus (UNFICYP)
- 1974 Cypriot coup
- Canadian Peacekeeping
- Taksim
- Enosis
