= Operation Structure =

Operation Structure was the Canadian Forces humanitarian aid response to the tsunami that struck Southeast Asia on December 26, 2004. The operation carried out by the Disaster Assistance Response Team was deployed on January 2 and ended on February 19, 2005.
