= Operation Addition =

Operation Addition was the name given to the Canadian contribution to United Nations Mission in Ethiopia and Eritrea, the United Nations peacekeeping forces in Ethiopia and Eritrea after the Eritrean–Ethiopian War. It began in late 2000 with Operation Eclipse during which the Canadians worked as part of a joint battle group with the Dutch peace-keeping forces. The Canadian contingent was part of an international team monitoring the Temporary Security Zone between Ethiopia and Eritrea. The commitment ended in June 2003.
