= Operation Canopy =

Coordinates: 52.2941°N 81.6301°W

Operation Canopy (OP Canopy) was the Canadian Forces (CF) participation in Canadian government efforts to help the residents of Kashechewan, Ontario during an evacuation of the community in late 2005. Military personnel flew to Kashechewan to supplement local water treatment facilities.

Media reports indicated 138 military personnel participated in OP Canopy, including:

- a ROWPU detachment consisting of personnel from 4 Airfield Engineer Squadron (4 AES) at 4 Wing CFB Cold Lake, Alberta, and 86 Airfield Support Unit (86 ASU) at 8 Wing CFB Trenton, Ontario;
- members from 3 Canadian Rangers Patrol Group located in northern Ontario who helped with ROWPU operations, distribution of drinking water, assistance to community elders, and liaison with community leaders; and
- reservists, employed as liaison officers in Cochrane, Sudbury, Sault Ste. Marie, and Timmins (all in Ontario).

The detachment arrived in Kashechewan on 30 October 2005 and the operation continued until 17 December, producing potable water by means of a reverse osmosis water purification system. According to media reports, was producing treated water from raw water obtained from the Albany River within 12 hours of arrival. OP Canopy continued until 16 December 2005. The mission produced enough potable water to meet the community’s daily needs during the operation, as well as creating a reserve of treated water - a total of 140,000 litres (almost 30,800 imperial gallons, or almost 37,000 U.S. gallons).

Media coverage of documents released to Canadian media under Canada's Access to Information Act suggested the exercise was perceived as a public relations exercise. One report in the documents said, "No estimate, detailed planning or needs assessment were completed before the commitment of the personnel and equipment .... Although an excellent PR exercise, the true need of the detachment was never established." Other problems highlighted in media:

- ".... the high-tech equipment did not work well in cold temperatures and water drawn from the river had to be preheated before being treated ...."
- ".... finding storage space (in the community) for 190,000 litre bags of water that were filled only to three-quarters capacity to allow for expansion in case they froze in the northern climate ...."

While the Canadian Forces reportedly said OP Canopy cost about $350,000 in "incremental" expenses (costs over and above operating and salary costs routinely spent even if the staff and equipment used had not been deployed to Kashechewan), an internal military e-mail reportedly puts the true cost at more than $860,000, including pay for personnel and CC-130 Hercules flights. Based on these figures, each litre of treated water cost approximately CDN$6.14 to produce (approximately CDN$27.92 per imperial gallon, or approximately CDN$23.24 per U.S. gallon).
