= Operation Toucan (East Timor) =

Military operation

Operation TOUCAN was a Canadian military operation in East Timor. In 1999, the Canadian military deployed approximately 600 personnel as part of INTERFET, the International Force in East Timor.
