= Operation Kinetic (1999) =

Canadian deployment action of Canadian soldiers in Kosovo

Operation Kinetic was the name given to the deployment of 1,400 Canadian soldiers to Kosovo as part of the overall NATO effort in 1999 to stabilize the region. The Canadian Huey, the CH-146 Griffon was deployed there in this operation.
