= National Peacekeepers' Day =

Official remembrance day for Canadian peacekeepers

National Peacekeepers' Day (French: Journée Nationale des Casques Bleus) is an official remembrance day for Canadian veterans of military peacekeeping activities. It is officially marked on 9 August of each year and alternately may be observed on the closest Sunday.

The date was chosen to commemorate 9 August 1974, when nine Canadian peacekeepers serving on UNEF II were killed when their aircraft was shot down over Syria, the highest number of Canadian peacekeepers killed in a single incident.

While British Columbia Order in Council 856 first set August 9 as Peacekeepers memorial day on June 30, 1993, Federal legislation to make the day an official national day in Canada was passed in June 2008.

== See also ==
- Canadian peacekeeping
- International Day of United Nations Peacekeepers
