= Operation Altair =

Canadian Marine operation

Operation Altair was the Canadian Forces maritime contribution to the U.S.-led coalition anti-terrorist campaign known as Operation Enduring Freedom (OEF).

Operation Altair mainly consisted of single ship deployments. HMCS Toronto, a Halifax-class patrol frigate with an embarked helicopter detachment, was the first ship to sail under Operation Altair. She deployed from January to July 2004, sailing with the USS George Washington Carrier Strike Group. However, due to operational requirements elsewhere around the world, there were periods when there was no Canadian maritime contribution to OEF.

Additionally, Canada's military contribution to the international campaign against terrorism from October 2001 to October 2003 was known as Operation Apollo, which saw soldiers deployed in Kandahar, Afghanistan, and ships deployed in the Persian Gulf region as well.

The tasks performed under Operation Altair were subsequently carried out under Operation Saiph.

== Deployments ==
January to July 2004 (Rotation 0): HMCS Toronto deployed from Halifax and operated with the USS George Washington Carrier Strike Group.

April to October 2005 (Rotation 1): HMCS Winnipeg deployed from Esquimalt and operated with the U.S. Fifth Fleet

September 2006 to March 2007 (Rotation 2): HMCS Ottawa deployed from Esquimalt and operated with the USS Boxer Expeditionary Strike Group.

November 2007 to April 2008 (Rotation 3): HMCS Charlottetown deployed from Halifax and operated with the USS Harry S. Truman Carrier Strike Group.

April 2008 to October 2008 (Rotation 4): HMCS Iroquois from Halifax deployed with HMC ships Protecteur and Calgary from Esquimalt on 14 April 2008 as a three-ship Canadian task group that operated with the special Combined Task Force 150 from 3 June to 15 September 2008. Commodore Bob Davidson commanded CTF 150 with his flag in HMCS Iroquois. HMCS Protecteur and HMCS Calgary returned to Esquimalt on 3 October 2008 having circumnavigated the globe during the operation, travelling through the Panama and Suez Canals.
