= Operation Athena =

2003–2011 Canadian military mission in Afghanistan

Operation Athena was the Canadian Forces' contribution to the International Security Assistance Force (ISAF) in Afghanistan. The operation was divided in two phases: the first one took place from July 2003 to July 2005 in the Kabul region and the second one from August 2005 to December 2011 in the Kandahar area. The operation's main objective was to improve Afghanistan's security and governance. Operation Athena in Kandahar constituted the longest combat mission in the history of Canadian Forces. With over 40,000 Canadian military members that, at some point, entered the country—often several times—this operation constitutes the largest military deployment of the Canadian Forces since World War II.

== Context ==
Following the terrorist attacks on 9/11 in New York City, the United States started a military campaign against the Taliban regime and Al-Qaeda in Afghanistan. Canada officially joined this campaign on October 9, 2001.

Operation Athena followed Operation Apollo, codename for the initial deployment of Canadian Force troops in Afghanistan from October 2001 to October 2003. Operation Athena was an integral part of the International Security Assistance Force (ISAF) in Afghanistan created by the United Nations Security Council Resolution 1386 on December 13, 2001. Thereafter, other United Nations Security Council Resolutions have extended the ISAF's mandate.

The military operation in Afghanistan was part of a government-wide effort; indeed, Canada is one of the main international donors in Afghanistan and several other ministries were involved along with the Canadian Department of National Defence.

== Purpose ==
Operation Athena's objective was to assist the Afghan government in order to help it govern better in a more stable environment. Its purpose was to deploy 5300 Canadian soldiers in Afghanistan, within a coalition of about forty countries. In this context, the ISAF was in charge of fighting the insurgents, and on a wider scale, was also responsible of the development and maintenance of security; Canada was, in terms of number of troops provided to the ISAF, the fifth country after the United States, the United Kingdom, France and Germany.

The Kandahar Province provincial reconstruction team (PRT) aims to help the Afghan government to rebuild the country with the help of developmental projects, but also to extend its authority and to provide services to the citizens. The PRT – one of the 27 in Afghanistan – was under Canadian responsibility during Phase Two of Operation Athena. The Kandahar PRT was composed of diplomats, engineers, policemen, correctional officials and soldiers. It represented the Afghan government before the Province's local authorities.

== Phases ==
=== Phase One ===
Operation Athena began on 17 July 2003 with the installation of Brigadier-General Peter Devlin as commander of the ISAF's Kabul Multi-National Brigade. Two days later, 3rd Battalion, The Royal Canadian Regiment began deploying as the first rotation of Task Force Kabul. The operation evolved into a 1,900-personnel task force which provided assistance to civilian infrastructure such as well-digging and repair of local buildings. ISAF's primary objective in 2004 was ensuring the safe conduct of Afghanistan's first democratic election, which was held on 9 October. Hamid Karzai was declared the winner, and on 9 December he was inaugurated President of the Islamic Republic of Afghanistan. Phase one of Operation Athena ended in July 2005.

=== Phase Two ===
In 2005, ISAF began to extend its operations beyond Kabul to support the development and growth of Afghanistan's governmental institutions, especially its national security forces. In August 2005, the second phase of Operation Athena began with the Canadian Forces assuming command of Kandahar Province from a United States Army task force deployed under Operation Enduring Freedom.

== History ==
Operation Athena started on July 17, 2003, in the Kabul region when Brigadier General Peter Devlin was assigned to command the multinational ISAF brigade, the troops' deployment was scheduled to effectively start on July 19, with a battlegroup built around the 3rd Battalion Royal Canadian Regiment. The ISAF became a coalition directed by the NATO on August 11. The very same day, Major General Andrew Leslie was appointed second in command of the ISAF. The Canadian embassy in Kabul opened in August.

The ISAF's main role in 2003 was to establish and to maintain security in Kabul when the new constitution was being written by the Loya Jirga, symbolizing the end of the Taliban regime. On February 9, 2004, Lieutenant-General Rick Hillier was appointed Commander of the ISAF. At this time, the Canadian military represented 40% of the ISAF. The year 2004 held the first Afghan presidential election on October 9, and it was of ISAF's responsibility to ensure that they were properly conducted.

In 2005, the ISAF's efforts started to extend outside of Kabul. The second phase of Operation Athena started with the deployment of a battlegroup built around the 2nd Battalion Royal Canadian Regiment in Kandahar in August 2005. This battlegroup constituted the Kandahar Task Force, taking over the American task force deployed in this region during Operation Enduring Freedom. Thus, the Canadian Forces played an important role in one of Afghanistan's most dangerous regions. This second phase constituted the Canadian Forces' first participation to an oversea operation as an actor of a government-wide deployment.

== Rotations ==
The battle groups were composed of a battalion of regular force of infantry which would normally remain in Afghanistan for about six months.

Operation Athena's rotations
Rotation	Unit	Dates
Kabul
0	3rd Battalion, The Royal Canadian Regiment	August 2003 to February 2004
1	3rd Battalion, Royal 22^{e} Régiment	February 2004 to August 2004
2	1st Battalion, Princess Patricia's Canadian Light Infantry, with Reconnaissance Squadron, Lord Strathcona's Horse	August 2004 to February 2005
3	1st Battalion, The Royal Canadian Regiment	February 2005 to July 2005
Kandahar
0	2nd Battalion, The Royal Canadian Regiment	August 2005 to February 2006
1	1st Battalion, Princess Patricia's Canadian Light Infantry	February 2006 to July 2006
2	1st Battalion, The Royal Canadian Regiment	August 2006 to February 2007
3	2nd Battalion, The Royal Canadian Regiment	February 2007 to August 2007
4	3rd Battalion, Royal 22^{e} Régiment	August 2007 to February 2008
5	2nd Battalion, Princess Patricia's Canadian Light Infantry	February 2008 to August 2008
6	3rd Battalion, The Royal Canadian Regiment	August 2008 To February 2009
7	2nd Battalion, Royal 22^{e} Régiment	February 2009 to August 2009
8	1st Battalion, Princess Patricia's Canadian Light Infantry	August 2009 to February 2010
9	1st Battalion, The Royal Canadian Regiment	February 2010 to October 2010
10	1st Battalion, Royal 22^{e} Régiment	October 2010 to July 2011
11	Transition mission's task forces essentially coming from the Land Force Western Area	July 2011 to December 2011

== See also ==
- Canada's role in the Afghanistan War
