= Inside Fighting Canada =

- Opening title
- Directed by: Jane Marsh
- Written by: Jane Marsh
- Produced by: James Beveridge
- Narrated by: Lorne Greene
- Edited by: Jane Marsh
- Production company: National Film Board of Canada
- Distributed by: Columbia Pictures of Canada
- Release date: 1942
- Running time: 11 minutes
- Country: Canada
- Language: English

Inside Fighting Canada is an 11-minute 1942 Canadian documentary film, made by the National Film Board of Canada (NFB) as part of the wartime Canada Carries On series. The film, written and directed by Jane Marsh and produced by James Beveridge, was an account of the Canadian military during the Second World War. The film's French version is titled Canada en guerre.

== Synopsis ==
Canada in the 1930s was a peaceful nation with limitless potential and great resources of timberlands, prairie wheat fields and bountiful fisheries. After the outbreak of the Second World War, Canada was transformed into a nation at war. Thousands of recruits entered the military to begin their training. The first concern was to buttress the borders of a country with 24,000 miles of coastline to defend. On the home front, industrial production soared with factories converting to munitions and other weapons of war.

By 1942, Canada is the "aerodrome of democracy" with its involvement in the British Commonwealth Air Training Plan. (Note: On the third anniversary of the British Commonwealth Air Training Plan. President Franklin D. Roosevelt enthused that the BCATP had transformed Canada into the "aerodrome of democracy", a play on his earlier description of the United States as "the Arsenal of Democracy.") Canada trained thousands of airmen from the Royal Air Force (RAF), Royal Navy Fleet Air Arm (FAA), Royal Australian Air Force (RAAF), Royal Canadian Air Force (RCAF), the United States Army Air Corps and Royal New Zealand Air Force (RNZAF) (as well as airmen from many other countries) from bases stretching across the country.

In a spirit of democratic cooperation with other Allied/United Nations, Canadians responded to the needs of war, both in Canada and globally. In cooperation with the United States, one of the great strategic projects was the Alaska Highway where Canada created the Northwest Staging Route to fly aircraft from North America to Asia.

By the fourth year of the war, Canada's fighting men and women are also engaged in battles on land, sea and air, pitted against the might of Nazi Germany and its allies.

== Production ==
Typical of the NFB's Second World War documentary short films in the Canada Carries On series, Inside Fighting Canada was made in cooperation with the Director of Public Information, Herbert Lash. The film was created as a morale boosting propaganda film. "The film [Inside Fighting Canada] was making an important point. Audiences had seen in earlier films how the Nazis were building their empire upon a modern form of medieval slavery. Democracy built its defences with the voluntary effort of people exercising their own free will. Here then was the implied comparison between the two systems and democracy stood supreme. Characteristically, no mention was made of conscription, which had split the nation badly in the spring of 1942."

Inside Fighting Canada was a compilation documentary that relied heavily on newsreel material, edited by Jane Marsh, to provide a coherent story. "Marsh brought an unprecedented level of creative energy and commitment to the propaganda film production team." The only women to direct propaganda films for the NFB, her attempt to challenge NFB director John Grierson on his decision to refuse to name her as the producer of the Canada Carries On series led to her ultimate resignation in 1944. "Later, Grierson would admit that Marsh had good reason to resign, adding that he had never considered offering such a prestigious position to a woman."

The deep baritone voice of stage actor Lorne Greene was featured in the narration of Inside Fighting Canada. Greene was known for his work on both radio broadcasts as a news announcer at CBC as well as narrating many of the Canada Carries On series. His sonorous recitation led to his nickname, "The Voice of Canada", and to some observers, the "voice-of-God". When reading grim battle statistics or narrating a particularly serious topic, he was known as "The Voice of Doom".

== Reception ==
Inside Fighting Canada was produced in 35 mm for the theatrical market. Each film was shown over a six-month period as part of the shorts or newsreel segments in approximately 800 theatres across Canada. The NFB had an arrangement with Famous Players theatres to ensure that Canadians from coast-to-coast could see them, with further distribution by Columbia Pictures.

After the six-month theatrical tour ended, individual films were made available on 16 mm to schools, libraries, churches and factories, extending the life of these films for another year or two. They were also made available to film libraries operated by university and provincial authorities. A total of 199 films were produced before the series was canceled in 1959.

Historian Malek Khouri, in analyzing Inside Fighting Canada and the role of propaganda in the NFB wartime documentaries, said. "During the early years of the NFB, its creative output was largely informed by the turbulent political and social climate the world was facing. World War II, Communism, unemployment, the role of labour unions, and working conditions were all subjects featured by the NFB during the period from 1939 to 1946". Khouri further stated: ""As it stresses the importance of women's contribution during the war, 'Inside Fighting Canada' emphasizes that this effort should not be conceived as a 'temporary war measure,' and that instead, it should be considered the start for a new era where women can equally contribute to building a better future for the entire society."

== See also ==
- The Home Front (1940), a NFB documentary on the role of women on the home front in the Second World War
- Look to the North (1944), a NFB documentary on building of the Alaska Highway
- Pincers on Japan (1941), a NFB documentary on building of the Alaska Highway
- Proudly She Marches (1943), a NFB documentary on Canadian women in military service in the Second World War
- Rosies of the North (1999), a NFB documentary on the Canadian Car and Foundry in the Second World War
- Wings on her Shoulder (1943), a NFB documentary on the Royal Canadian Air Force Women's Division in the Second World War
- Women Are Warriors (1942), a NFB documentary on Canadian women in military service in the Second World War
