= Air cadets =

Air cadets may refer to:

- Members of the British Air Training Corps
- Members of the RAF section of the Combined Cadet Force
- Members of the Australian Air Force Cadets
- Members of the Belgian Air Cadets
- Members of the Royal Canadian Air Cadets
- Members of the New Zealand Air Training Corps, New Zealand Cadet Forces
- Cadets at the United States Air Force Academy or in Air Force Reserve Officers Training Corps
- Cadet Members of the Civil Air Patrol, the US Air Force Auxiliary
- Members of the Hong Kong Air Cadet Corps

== See also ==
- Air Cadet (film), a 1951 film directed by Joseph Pevney
- Air Cadets (film), a 1944 Canadian propaganda film
