= Women Are Warriors =

- Opening title
- Directed by: Jane Marsh
- Written by: Jane Marsh
- Produced by: Raymond Spottiswoode; Stanley Hawes (executive producer)
- Narrated by: Lorne Greene
- Cinematography: Jane Marsh
- Edited by: Jane Marsh
- Music by: Lucio Agostini
- Production company: National Film Board of Canada
- Distributed by: Columbia Pictures of Canada
- Release date: 1942
- Running time: 14 minutes
- Country: Canada
- Language: English

Women Are Warriors is a 14-minute 1942 Canadian documentary film, made by the National Film Board of Canada (NFB) as part of the wartime Canada Carries On series, and dealt with women in war. The film was produced by Raymond Spottiswoode and written and directed by Jane Marsh. The film's French version title is Les Femmes dans la mêlée.

== Synopsis ==
In 1942, during the Second World War, as demands on the Canadian military grow, women are taking an increasingly important place alongside men. Not only in Canada were the strengths and talents of women being harnessed in a "total war" that had reached global proportions.

In Great Britain when the war began, military authorities soon realized the importance of mobilizing all their citizens. Entering the industrial workforce, women supplemented men in many positions at munitions factories. Through the civilian Women's Volunteer Service women became nurses, ambulance drivers and Air Raid Wardens. Following in the wake of the volunteer organizations were the specialized Women's Auxiliary, dedicated to freeing men for other military service. The Women's Auxiliaries included the women in the Auxiliary Territorial Service (ATS) with women as orderlies, drivers, postal workers, ammunition inspectors and operating searchlight units. The women pilots in the RAF Ferry Command took on the important but dangerous role of ferrying aircraft from factories or repair depots to the front line Royal Air Force operational units.

In the Soviet Union, the strength of one hundred million women is being seen in many ways. Women have taken on great responsibilities from running the collective farms, working in industrial production, and serving in the military units on the front lines. In the Soviet Supreme Council, 227 women deputies also were elected.

Canada also saw women becoming involved in the war effort. As Canadian men are being mobilized to serve in the military, three million women are also mobilized to serve in the "home front". The largest contribution by Canadian women was through unpaid volunteer work, participating in recycling programs, creating Red Cross packages, hosting dances for servicemen and other related domestic activities. The other important role that women took on was at munitions factories, turning out the tools of war.

Canadian women also served in the military with the Canadian Women's Army Corps taking over 21 types of army duties, enabling men to be released for combat service. The Canadian Nursing Sisters have gone overseas. In the Woman's Division in the Royal Canadian Air Force (RCAF) women became clerks, drivers, photographers, air photo interpreters, weather observers, instrument mechanics, parachute riggers as well as many administrative and technical positions in the RCAF. Most women served at British Commonwealth Air Training Plan stations across Canada. (Note: Their motto was: "We serve that men may fly.")

Canadian women will also play a part after the war, in building a new world.

== Cast ==
- Lady Reading
- Mary Johnston, RAF Ferry pilot
- Josef Stalin
- Guerna Bak, Soviet Collective farm commissar
- Nadia Suplikava, Soviet Union farm worker
- Kama Najidova, Soviet Union Petroleum Engineer
- Klatika Kosina, Soviet Union, locomotive drive
- Inidia Trokikya, Soviet Union railway director

== Production ==
Typical of the NFB's Second World War documentary short films in the Canada Carries On series, Women Are Warriors was created as a morale boosting propaganda film, originally with the working title of "Work for Women". The film was a compilation documentary that relied heavily on newsreel material to provide the background to the dialogue. "['Women Are Warriors'] represents an excellent example of the creative application of the compilation model in NFB films. The film brings together huge pre-edited chunks of British and Soviet footage with practically no NFB-produced material. Marsh's editing approach and her ability to incorporate a multitude of distinct newsreel footage was instinctual with a powerful artistic and political force."

In a dispute with NFB director John Grierson, Director Jane Marsh had her material re-edited. "The difference between the original script prepared by Marsh and the final version of the film [Women Are Warriors] was quite vast. Comparing the two versions illustrates that some NFB filmmakers were insistent on pushing the envelope even further with their class-based analysis, and that by the end they would settle for solutions that accepted the limitations associated with working within a government agency." The "final cut of 'Women Are Warriors', for example, hardly resembles the ambition of her original treatment on women's contemporary situation. ... After a final disagreement with Grierson, who refused to let a woman head his 'Canada Carries On' series, Marsh resigned from the NFB in 1944."

The deep baritone voice of stage actor Lorne Greene was featured in the narration of Women Are Warriors. Greene was known for his work on both radio broadcasts as a news announcer at CBC as well as narrating many of the Canada Carries On series. His sonorous recitation led to his nickname, "The Voice of Canada", and to some observers, the "voice-of-God". When reading grim battle statistics or narrating a particularly serious topic, he was known as "The Voice of Doom".

== Reception ==
Women Are Warriors was produced in 35 mm for the theatrical market. Each film was shown over a six-month period as part of the shorts or newsreel segments in approximately 800 theatres across Canada. The NFB had an arrangement with Famous Players theatres to ensure that Canadians from coast-to-coast could see them, with further distribution by Columbia Pictures.

After the six-month theatrical tour ended, individual films were made available on 16 mm to schools, libraries, churches and factories, extending the life of these films for another year or two. They were also made available to film libraries operated by university and provincial authorities. A total of 199 films were produced before the series was canceled in 1959.

Historian Malek Khouri analyzed the role of the NFB wartime documentaries with Women Are Warriors characterized as an example of a propaganda film. "During the early years of the NFB, its creative output was largely informed by the turbulent political and social climate the world was facing. World War II, Communism, unemployment, the role of labour unions, and working conditions were all subjects featured by the NFB during the period from 1939 to 1946".

The role of women depicted in Women Are Warriors also showed an acceptance of a new role to come in postwar years. In an examination of the role of the NFB in wartime, historian George Evans observed: "If contemporary feminists sense omissions and patronizing in the film, one must at least acknowledge that [Women Are Warriors] expressed a positive attitude to working women and was conditioning audiences to become accustomed to new and permanent women's roles in the workplace." He further noted: "The film ['Women Are Warriors'] ended with a superb montage moving from shots of women in factories to a plane in action, to factory, to plane to factory and plane to demonstrate how important women's roles were to the war effort."

Film Historian Barbara Halpern Martineau considered the significance of Women Are Warriors in a historical context. "Unlike 'Women at War' and 'Wings on Her Shoulders', 'Women Are Warriors' makes it clear that these women were not leisurely idlers before the war - they were domestic workers, secretaries, doing whatever work was available for women. But just as the implications of Jane Marsh's original title, 'Work for Women', were suppressed in favour of 'Women Are Warriors', so the implications of the film's structure and commentary are suppressed by the use of a male narrator - the same patriotic, reassuring voice heard in so many films showing men at war."

The Academy Film Archive preserved Women Are Warriors in 2008. The film is part of the Academy War Film Collection, one of the largest collections of World War II era short films held outside government archives.

== See also ==
- The Home Front (1940), a NFB documentary on the role of women on the home front in the Second World War
- Wings on her Shoulder (1943), a NFB documentary on the Royal Canadian Air Force Women's Division
- Rosies of the North (1999), a NFB documentary on the women who worked at the Canadian Car and Foundry building fighter and bomber aircraft in the Second World War
