= Jean Davey =

Canadian physician

Dr. Jean Flatt Davey
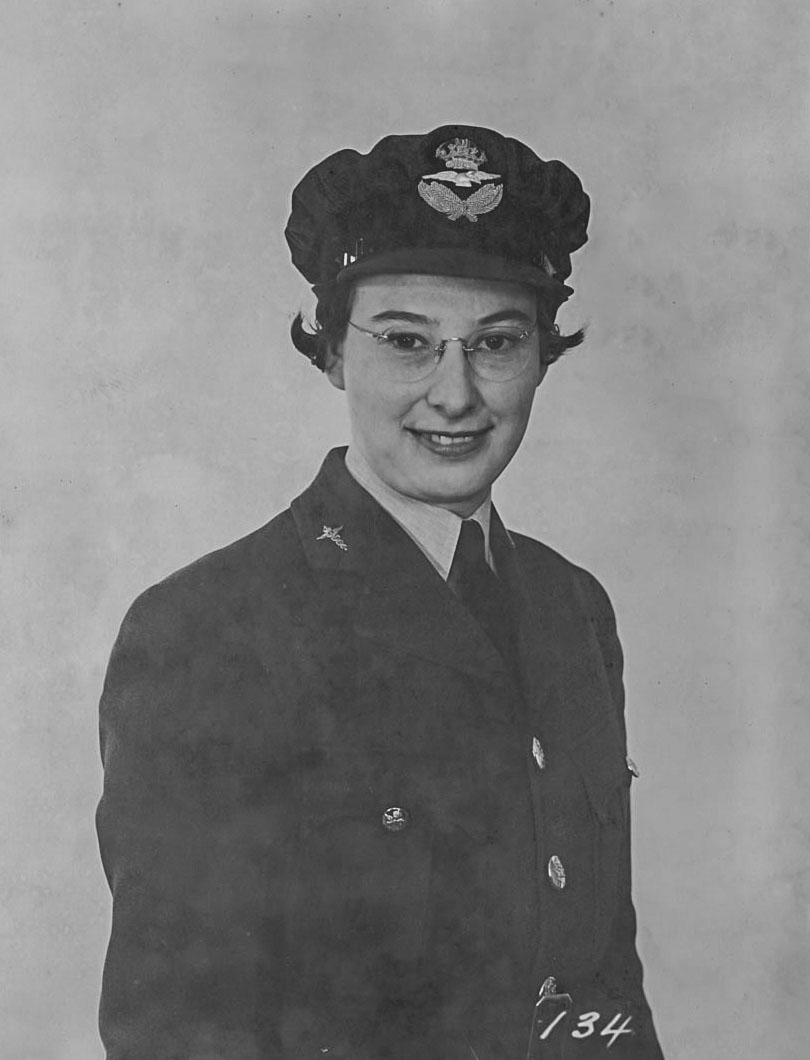
- Born: March 16, 1909; Hamilton, Ontario, Canada
- Died: March 13, 1980 (aged 70)
- Education: University of Toronto (BA. 1933; M.D. 1936)
- Occupation: Physician
- Years active: 1936–1973
- Employer(s): Women’s College Hospital, Toronto General Hospital, Royal Canadian Air Force (RCAF)

Jean Flatt Davey OC, OBE (March 16, 1909 – March 13, 1980) was a Canadian physician. In August 1941, Davey joined the medical branch of the Royal Canadian Air Force (RCAF) and became the first female doctor to be granted a commission in the medical branch of any Canadian armed force. From 1950 to 1965 she was the Physician-in-Chief of the Department of Medicine at Toronto's Women's College Hospital.

== Early life and education ==
Jean Flatt Davey was born in Hamilton, Ontario, in 1909. Her father, Dr. J. Edgar Davey, the medical officer of Hamilton and a military doctor who served as a Lieutenant-colonel during World War I in a hospital in France, inspired her to follow in his footsteps and pursue medicine. Davey attended the University of Toronto and completed a Bachelor of Arts degree in 1933 and then continued on to graduate from its medical school in 1936. In the two years following that she completed an internship at Toronto General Hospital, followed by a one-year placement at Women's College Hospital as a resident physician, specializing in internal medicine. In 1945, she became a Fellow of the Royal College of Surgeons of Canada.

== Career ==
In 1939, Davey joined the staff of Women's College Hospital. While at Women's College Hospital, Davey was approached by military officials to assist with the war effort in the medical branch of the Royal Canadian Air Force. In August 1941, Dr. Davey became the first woman doctor to be granted a commission in the medical branch of any Canadian armed force and the second woman to enlist in the Royal Canadian Air Force.

Initially she was stationed in Ottawa with the rank of Flight Officer. Within a short period of time, she was promoted to Squadron Officer and was in complete charge of the health of the Royal Canadian Air Force Women's Division. In her role as Squadron Officer, she was responsible for the efficient organization of the medical care of the airwomen of the RCAF Women's Division. The Women's Division in 1944 consisted of approximately 17,000 airwomen serving in Canada, the United States, Newfoundland, Great Britain and the West Indies. In addition to ensuring that every RCAF station had adequate medical care for every airwoman, she was responsible for creating military policy related to the physical standards of female enlistment and policy on other relevant medical issues such as pregnancy. As Squadron Officer, she would travel throughout Canada inspecting and reviewing RCAF bases and recruiting stations to ensure that each location met the appropriate medical standards for airwomen. To assist her with her duties, Davey was aided by eight Canadian university-trained female doctors in 1942, a number that soon increased to eleven by 1943.

Davey served with the RCAF until her retirement from the military on May 9, 1945. She then returned to Women's College Hospital where she held the position of Associate Chief of the Department of Medicine from 1945 to 1950. Following that, she became Physician-in-Chief of the Department of Medicine from 1950 to 1965.

Davey became the first woman to head a Department of Medicine at a teaching hospital in Canada when Women's College Hospital became a teaching hospital fully affiliated with the University of Toronto in 1961. Finally, she held the position of Director of Medical Teaching, Out-Patient department from 1965 until her retirement in 1973.

== Personal life ==
She had two notable hobbies: baseball and gardening. According to a 1980 press release by Women's College Hospital after her death, “the rose garden in front of Women’s College Hospital [the former hospital building] was developed as a living tribute” to Davey.

== Retirement and legacy ==
Davey retired from Women's College Hospital in 1973. In honour of her legacy, Women's College Hospital established the Dr. Jean Davey Honorary Fund that same year in order to provide financial assistance to the employees of Women's College Hospital to further their education and upgrade their skills. Davey died on March 13, 1980.

== Awards, recognitions, and memberships ==
On May 28, 1943, Davey was made an Officer of the Order of the British Empire in recognition of her exemplary wartime service. In 1973, she was awarded the Order of Canada in recognition of her outstanding medical and military careers. According to a tribute written by Dr. Walter Hannah “Davey received this award personally from the hands of the Governor General”.

She held several membership and leadership roles, including: a seat on the Board of Regents of Victoria University, National Medical Consultant at the Victorian Order of Nurses, President of the Medical Staff (at Women's College Hospital), Chairman of the Medical Advisory Committee (at Women's College Hospital) and Chief Examining Officer of the examining board of the Royal College of Physicians and Surgeons of Canada.

There is a Jean Davey Drive in the Barrhaven neighbourhood of Ottawa.
