= Air Cadets (film) =

- Theatrical poster
- Directed by: Jane Marsh
- Written by: Jane Marsh
- Narrated by: Lorne Greene
- Cinematography: Radford "Budge" Crawley
- Edited by: Jane Marsh
- Production company: National Film Board of Canada
- Distributed by: Columbia Pictures of Canada
- Release date: May 25, 1944
- Running time: 15 minutes
- Country: Canada
- Language: English

Air Cadets (also known as Air Cadet) is a 15-minute 1944 Canadian documentary film, made by the National Film Board of Canada (NFB) as part of the wartime Canada Carries On series. The film describes the Air Cadet Movement in 1944 during the Second World War. Air Cadets was directed by Jane Marsh, who was also the writer and editor on the production. The film's French version title is Les Cadets de l'air.

== Synopsis ==
In 1941, the Secretary of State for Canada granted a Charter to the Air Cadet League of Canada. The organization was officially incorporated as a charitable, voluntary non-profit corporation with the mandate of working in partnership with the Royal Canadian Air Force (RCAF) to sponsor young males from 12 to 18 years of age, as future aircrew. With headquarters in Ottawa, sponsors and volunteers were recruited provincially and a Chairman was appointed in each province.

By 1944, a total of 374 squadrons, over 29,000 Air Cadets, 1,750 officers and instructors and another 2,000 civilians who supplied financial and other support had become involved in the Air Cadet Movement. Air cadets received training on aeronautics and military subjects in an after-school program. Other cadet programs such as band and drill were also taught.

Once a year, air cadets were able to go to a 10-day summer camp. The camp was a "tent village" located on an RCAF base such as RCAF Detachment Carp, a relief landing field for No.2 Service Flying Training School at RCAF Station Uplands, Ottawa. While at camp, cadets have an opportunity to work closely with RCAF personnel and receive practical instruction on RCAF frontline aircraft, including trainers, seaplanes, fighters and bombers.

In preparation for a career in the RCAF, cadets from all across Canada receive an introduction to aeronautical subjects such as navigation, mechanics and flying, as well as an orientation to military life.

== Production ==
Although part of the NFB's Second World War documentary short films in the Canada Carries On series, under the working title of Air Cadet, it was the first film in the series to be shot in colour. Like many of the other films in the series, Air Cadets was created as a morale boosting propaganda film, however, focusing on young people in the Air Cadets. Air Cadets utilized more of a docudrama or "realistic/actuality" approach. The film relied heavily on filming actual events as they occurred rather than staging events, with only two scenes filmed in a "studio" setting in Ottawa, Ontario.

Principal photography for Air Cadets took place in August, September and October 1943. Marsh was accompanied on location by Frank Radford "Budge" Crawley, who was the cinematographer on the film. Sequences were shot at air cadet squadrons situated throughout Canada, including scenes in Vancouver, British Columbia, Lunenburg, Nova Scotia, Toronto, RCAF Detachment Carp and RCAF Station Rockcliffe.

A great deal of aerial footage was filmed by "Budge" Crawley from aircraft flying alongside operational RCAF aircraft. Scenes of RCAF bombers, including the Avro Lancaster and a pair of Handley Page Halifax bombers as well as a formation flight of Supermarine Spitfire fighter aircraft, however, were photographed in flight by the Royal Canadian Air Force (RCAF) Overseas Film Unit in Great Britain.

Director Jane Marsh's editing approach and her ability to incorporate a multitude of distinct sequences was "instinctual with a powerful artistic and political force." The choice to concentrate on a human interest story and feature some of the cadets in main "speaking roles" meant that the typical use of stage actor Lorne Greene was limited in the narration of Air Cadets. (Note: Air Cadet Jack Davis was featured in a number of key scenes, including singing "This is Worth Fighting For" at the end of the film.") Greene, known for his deep baritone voice on both radio broadcasts as a news announcer at CBC as well as narrating many of the Canada Carries On series, would have been too powerful a presence in a story of the young people in the Air Cadets. (Note: Greene's sonorous recitation on NFB films led to his nicknames, "The Voice of Canada", the "voice-of-God", and even to some observers, "The Voice of Doom".)

In 1944, after a dispute with NFB founder John Grierson, when Marsh asked to be named as the executive producer on the Canada Carries On series, she resigned from the NFB. Grierson refused to consider a woman in a prestigious position at the National Film Board. (Note: During her conflict with Grierson, Marsh's work in Women Are Warriors (1942) was re-edited without her permission. The "final cut of 'Women Are Warriors' ... hardly resembles the ambition of her original treatment on women's contemporary situation.)

=== Aircraft in the film ===
The NFB had full cooperation from the RCAF to film at training bases as well as other operational stations. The RCAF aircraft seen in the film include:

- Avro Anson
- Avro Lancaster
- Bristol Bolingbrooke
- Cessna Bobcat
- Consolidated B-24 Liberator
- Douglas Digby
- Grumman Goose
- Handley Page Halifax
- Hawker Hurricane
- Lockheed Hudson
- Lockheed Ventura
- North American Harvard
- North American B-25 Mitchell
- Supermarine Spitfire

== Release ==
Air Cadets was shot on 16 mm Kodachrome film and sent to Technicolor Motion Picture Corporation in Hollywood to blow it up to 35 mm to produce release prints for the theatrical market. Although the film was completed in 1943, the delay in its release came from technical problems encountered at Technicolor.

Each film in the Canada Carries On series was shown over a six-month period as part of the shorts or newsreel segments in approximately 800 theatres across Canada. The NFB had an arrangement with Famous Players theatres to ensure that Canadians from coast-to-coast could see them, with further distribution by Columbia Pictures. After the six-month theatrical tour ended, individual films were made available on 16 mm to schools, libraries, churches and factories, extending the life of these films for another year or two. They were also made available to film libraries operated by university and provincial authorities. A total of 199 films were produced before the series was canceled in 1959.

The NFB considers Air Cadets a lost film. In 1967, the warehouse that stored many of the NFB films was destroyed by a fire, and as a result, most of the films were lost. What remains of Air Cadets, at present, is a 20-minute internegative copy consisting of individual film scenes that were shot by director Jane Marsh Beveridge and her cinematographers. (Note: In 1957, Crawley Films was contracted to produce The Air Cadet Story, a counterpart to the earlier Air Cadets film.)

== Reception ==
After Air Cadets was given a "Family" classification by the Ontario Film Review Board on May 23, 1944, the film was released two days later by Columbia Pictures in Canada. (Note: A "Family" classification is the equivalent of a "G" rating today.)
