= Jane Marsh Beveridge =

Canadian filmmaker and artist

- Born: December 2, 1915; Ottawa, Ontario, Canada
- Died: September 16, 1998 (aged 82)
- Other names: Jane Marsh, Jane Smart
- Education: Sarah Lawrence College
- Occupations: Filmmaker, Teacher, Sculptor
- Known for: Filmmaking, Sculpture
- Spouses: D'Arcy Gilbert Marsh; James Beveridge
- Children: D'Arcy S. Marsh

Jane Marsh Beveridge (born Jane Smart; December 2, 1915 – September 16, 1998) was a Canadian director, producer, editor, composer, screenwriter, teacher and sculptor. She was best known as one of the pioneering filmmakers at the National Film Board of Canada (NFB).

== Early years and education ==
Jane Smart was born in Ottawa, Ontario to Russel S. Smart and Emma Louise ("Louie") Parr; her father was a successful, self-made patent attorney. Russell and Louise had four children: Helen (b. 1909), Elizabeth (b. 1913), Jane (b. 1915) and Russell Jr. (b. 1921). (Note: Elizabeth Smart became a noted Canadian poet and novelist.)

The family had a summer house, which they named "The Barge", on Kingsmere Lake located next door to the future Prime Minister of Canada, William Lyon Mackenzie King. Jane grew up among the social elite of Ottawa through her father's connections as a lawyer. Her mother often hosted parties for prominent politicians and civil servants. As a result, the children socialized with many members of Ottawa's political class who were or would become important figures in Canadian history, including acquaintances such as Graham Spry, Charles Ritchie, Lester B. Pearson and William Lyon Mackenzie King. The three girls were very close, and when they made their debut in society events, "all clever and all attractive", were inevitably known as the "Three Smart Girls", aping the title of the 1936 Deanna Durbin film of the same name.

After a private prep school for girls, and later secondary school, in 1931, at the age of 16, Jane travelled to London with her mother and older sister, "Betty" who was studying piano with classical pianist Katharine Goodson at the University of London. During her formative years, Jane wrote (and published) poetry, drew and painted as well as playing the flute, and while in England, would study art.

Jane Marsh c.1943

== Filmmaking career ==
Jane Smart joined the National Film Board of Canada in 1941, initially working as a screenwriter. She proposed a film on the home front, focusing on a small town in Ontario during the Second World War, a project that went into pre-production but was never completed. She also headed a research study on the role of women in wartime. During her research for Work for Women, the original title of the later documentary, Women Are Warriors (1942), Smart created an unpublished report highlighting the difficulties that women faced historically and contemporarily in which she suggests that women are either: "1) Put up on a pedestal and hypnotized into thinking they are frail, incompetent and dependent or 2) subjugated for the expediency of 1. lust 2. cheap labour by men." Additionally, she asserts that men think women should never "be allowed to use their faculties for anything" other than "1. to make men comfortable 2. to bear children".

For her first few months, Smart was involved in a number of projects and according to Graham McInnes, a fellow NFB colleague, she was considered a "dilettante" who was in the NFB as "a lark". Smart, however, was given more responsibility and served as a writer and production assistant to other filmmakers before she was eventually given an opportunity to direct the short film, Alexis Tremblay: Habitant, working alongside cinematographer Judith Crawley, with work beginning in 1942. In her films, Smart used both a docudrama approach that relied heavily on staging events, as well as elements of a compilation documentary with newsreel footage edited to form the background to the dialogue. Her editing approach and her ability to incorporate a multitude of distinct sequences was "instinctual with a powerful artistic and political force." (Note: Along with Evelyn Spice Cherry, Smart was one of the few women directors at the NFB during the Second World War.)

In contrast with his earlier critical appraisal of her skills and work ethic, McInnes had a new appreciation of Smart. "Pretty soon she clicked into her niche as editor, scriptwriter and idea woman for her own program of films on women's activities, and her wayward, unpredictable spirit became totally immersed in a neat, well-turned, no-nonsense film about Link Trainers, and a romantic epic: 'Alexis Tremblay—Habitant'. With her blonde hair flying, her big expressive face, her turtleneck sweaters and corduroy pants, she soon became as grimy and effective as any producer: soon entered and excelled at the ruthlessly competitive film screenings where we all showed our work and mercilessly scarified each other on an ascetic diet of coffee and doughnuts."

With the successful completion of her first film, Smart would serve as the "de facto" executive producer for the Canada Carries On documentary series, helming six productions in two years. The films she spearheaded in this series were the only war propaganda films at the NFB directed by a woman. After an increase in interest in films about "the role of women", Marsh directed Women Are Warriors (1942), Proudly She Marches (1943) and Wings on Her Shoulder (1943).Women Are Warriors, was changed by supervisors from its original title, Work for Women. The film documented "women’s participation in the war effort in England, the USSR and Canada".

Marc St-Pierre, a writer for the NFB, claims that because Smart's wartime films are the "... only war propaganda films directed by a woman, about women, and speaking directly to women" that they are "firmly feminist" and "constitute a key moment in the history of women and film in Canada". Film historian Wyndham Wise suggests that Women are Warriors, specifically, promoted the concept that "women were not leisurely idlers before the conflict".

In a dispute with NFB founder John Grierson, Smart, now married and went by her married name as Jane Marsh, asked to be formally named as the executive producer on the Canada Carries On series. (Note: At the height of the conflict with Grierson, Marsh's work in Women Are Warriors was re-edited without her permission. The "final cut of 'Women Are Warriors'... hardly resembles the ambition of her original treatment on women's contemporary situation.) Faced with the difficulty in advancing her career, and after a final disagreement with Grierson, Marsh resigned from the NFB in 1944. Most sources cite struggles with Grierson, either over the furthering of her career or about the direction of the "Canada Carries On" series.

Marsh herself declared, "I resigned in April 1944, as Grierson had developed megalomania about the 'Canada Carries On' potential." In a series of meetings with Grierson, priorities and scheduling continually were changed until it became clear that she would not have a "free hand" in producing the film series. She and others have also claimed that Grierson did not want to have a woman producing Canada Carries On, despite Marsh's qualifications and experience with the series. In a later encounter with Grierson in postwar years, he acknowledged to her that he was wrong, but reiterated that he never would have given a woman that prestigious position. Marsh commented that during the years that Grierson was the NFB's commissioner, women "... were so grateful to be working in interesting jobs that they didn’t realize they were slaves".

After leaving the NFB, Marsh moved to New York to work for the British Information Services, where she created the Act and Fact newsreel short film series for British Information Services. The films, produced in a 16 mm format, closely followed the compilation documentary format that she had earlier used at the NFB. The subjects included the British Second Army’s activities in Europe, such as their participation in the Battle for Caen featured in the "Act and Fact #3: The Road to Paris". (Note: Both Canadian and British troops were involved in the liberation of Caen, France.) She stated that this series was intended "to let the Americans know that the British and Canadians were still fighting the war too."

== Family life ==
Jane was close to her sister Elizabeth and helped her sister when she was involved in an affair with poet George Barker. A curious incident that had Norman Bethune receiving a round-trip ticket to sail to England, that may have originated with either Jane or her sister, allowed the Canadian doctor to travel to Europe in wartime.

While working on the NFB documentary film, Inside Fighting Canada (1942), Marsh met fellow filmmaker James Beveridge who later became a war correspondent in the Royal Canadian Air Force, serving in Europe from 1944–1945. Jane, recently divorced, and with a son, D'Arcy, married James Beveridge after the Second World War but their marriage was short-lived. (Note: Marsh would retain her married name of Jane Marsh Beveridge throughout the rest of her life.) (Note: D'Arcy Marsh would follow his mother's vocation and interests, becoming a cinematographer and filmmaker, based in Arlington, Massachusetts.) According to Beveridge's daughter, he recounted that "I think Jane couldn't resist a man in an aviator's jacket. They had a brief and disastrous marriage after the war was over. When I once asked him about it, Dad told me that 'they were both too nutty' and so they went their separate ways."

== Later years ==
Jane Marsh Beveridge retired from filmmaking entirely in 1948. Returning to Canada, she earned her Bachelor's (1954) and Master's (1956) degrees from Sarah Lawrence College, moving on to become a teacher and sculptor.

== Filmography ==
- Women Are Warriors (French version title: Les Femmes dans la Mêlée)

This 14-minute 1942 documentary, produced by Raymond Spottiswoode and directed, edited, and scripted by Marsh, details how women participated in Canada, England, and Russia's war efforts during World War II. The film highlights jobs such as parachute nurses, army doctors, factory workers, and technicians, as well as "ferrying planes from factory to airfield, operating anti-aircraft guns, fighting on the front lines, and joining active service auxiliaries."

- Inside Fighting Canada (French version title: Canada en Guerre)

Produced by James Beveridge and directed, edited, and scripted by Marsh, this 11-minute 1942 documentary is an account of how "Canada was transformed into a fighting machine"during World War II. The film served as war propaganda that emphasized how "Canadians responded to the needs of war" by documenting how well the country was training airmen and soldiers, producing "war materials", and guarding Canada's borders.

- Proudly She Marches (French version title: Carrières de Femmes)

The lives of Canadian women as they prepared for the Canadian Women's Army Corps, the Royal Canadian Air Force, and the Women's Royal Canadian Naval Service are documented in this 18-minute 1943 film produced by Raymond Spottiswoode and directed by Marsh.

- Wings on Her Shoulder (French version title: Nos Femmes Ailées)

Marsh directed this nine-minute 1943 documentary, which is an account of how the 9,000 members of the Woman's Division of the Royal Canadian Air Force operated during World War II and prepared for their post-war role. After the war ended these aviators planned to act as "an essential factor in the air communications of peace-time civilization".

- Alexis Tremblay: Habitant (French version title: Terre de nos aïeux)

This 37-minute documentary film was the first film that Marsh directed, despite several of her war-oriented films finishing production sooner. Judith Crawley was the cinematographer and Marsh served as director, editor and script writer for the film, which depicted the everyday life of a Québec farmer, Alexis Tremblay, and his family. The film follows the family as several seasons pass and takes account of how each season shapes their different routines and types of work, from harvesting and baking in the fall to preparing the fields in the spring. Alexis Tremblay: Habitant remains one of the most popular films in NFB history, even having a screening at the Quebec Legislative Assembly (today the National Assembly of Quebec).

- Air Cadets (French version title: Les Cadets de l'air)

This 15-minute 1944 documentary, directed, edited, and scripted by Marsh, documented how Canada's "young flying enthusiasts" came from all over the nation to congregate at a Royal Canadian Air Force station and experience how the "spiritual and material value of their training" came to fruition.

- Spring on a Quebec Farm (1947, 10 minutes)
- Summer on a Quebec Farm (1947, 10 minutes)
- Winter on a Quebec Farm (1947, 12 minutes)

Produced by Gudrun Parker, from the film, Alexis Tremblay: Habitant directed by Marsh, with cinematography by Judith Crawley, this series of films was made after Marsh had left the NFB, by re-editing the original material, specifically against her wishes. The subject is entirely about French-Canadian farmers and their way of life. The series depicts the abundance and variety of work to be done on a farm, no matter the season.

== Publications ==
- Beveridge, Jane Marsh.A Cramboed Alphabestiary. New York: Vantage Press, 1990. ISBN 978-0-5330-8694-8.
- Beveridge, Jane Marsh et al., Conger, Marion and Joan McD Miller, eds.Ten Years of Poems: From Alan Dugan's Workshop at Castle Hill Center for the Arts, Truro, Massachusetts. Truro, Massachusetts: The Center, 1987.
