= Air Cadet League of Canada =

Canadian volunteer organization

- Badge of the Air Cadet League of Canada
- Active: 9 April 1941 – present
- Country: Canada
- Branch: Shared responsibility with the Canadian Forces
- Type: Youth Organization
- Headquarters: Ottawa, Ontario, Canada
- Motto: To Learn – To Serve – To Advance

Commanders
- National President: Marc Lacroix (2024)

Aircraft flown
- Trainer: Schweizer SGS 2-33/2-33A, Cessna 152, Cessna 172

The Air Cadet League of Canada is a volunteer organization that provides financial support and oversight to the Royal Canadian Air Cadets. The Air Cadet League owns all of the aircraft used in the Air Cadet Gliding Program. The League is organized into three levels: the National, the Provincial, and the local level, each of which is responsible for different areas of the League.

== History ==
The inception of the Air Cadet League of Canada took place at the start of the Second World War when Minister of National Defence for Air, Charles G. Power, identified a need to develop a volunteer-based organization with the goal to train youth in aviation skills. The need to have young men trained and ready to support the military efforts during the Second World War was the foundation of the Air Cadet League during this formative time period. By 1940, Order-in-Council PC6647 authorized the creation of the Air Cadet Movement in Canada where the Junior (boys aged 12–14) and the Senior (boys aged 15–18) Cadet Corps began. During the early developmental stages of the League, a partnership with the Royal Canadian Air Force helped boost the success of the Air Cadet Movement in Canada as a result of the availability to flying scholarships and training centres.

By April 9, 1941, the Secretary of State of Canada, by way of Letters Patent, granted an official Charter which established the Air Cadet League of Canada to operate as a non-profit corporation under Part II of the Companies Act 1937.

The Air Cadet Movement saw successful enrollment into the program during 1941 – 1944, reported growth four times the original enrollment numbers from 79 squadrons to 374. At the peak of the growth there were approximately 29,000 cadets enrolled.

Although the initial beginnings of the Air Cadet League of Canada during the 1940s were driven by military influences and the natural progression of the cadets during that time was to support the war, present-day functionalities of the League and cadet skillsets are sought after in various types of careers in the aviation and aerospace sector.

During the post-war period, the Air Cadet Movement saw a reduction of enrollment to 15,000 cadets nationwide, which was embraced during a much-warranted time of peace in the country. Despite the decrease in enrollment numbers, the Air Cadet League of Canada continued to see the value of developing leadership and good citizen responsibilities amongst Canadian youth. The organization evolved to become a space where students could learn flight training, effective speaking, teamwork, survival, navigation, marksmanship, music, aerospace and operations skillsets.

== Organization ==
The National Office is governed by the Board of Governors, the provincial level is governed by Provincial Committees and the local level by Sponsoring Committees. The Air Cadet League of Canada operates in collaboration with the Canadian Armed Forces, among other partners, to spearhead non-profit driven initiatives all while keeping today's Canadian boys and girls (between the ages of 12–18) interested in their personal and career development in aviation. The National Office is in Ottawa, Ontario, Canada.

As of 2023, it is reported that more than 27,000 youths are part of the Cadet Program as Air Cadets.

== Cadet training ==
The unification of the Canadian Armed Forces in 1968 saw the loss of the Royal Canadian Air Force partnership while the development of a new partnership with the Canadian Armed Forces began. The Cadet Instructors Cadre (CIC) Officers, who are members of the Canadian Armed Forces, facilitate and oversee the training program of the Air Cadets.

== Awards, scholarships, and programs ==
Cadets have access to awards, scholarships and programs as offered by the Air Cadet Program.

=== Gliding program ===
In 1965, the world's largest gliding program launched as part of a summer camp at Penhold, Alberta. On average there are more than 50,000 glider flights each year with the opportunity of each cadet obtaining at least one familiarization flight per year. Qualifying cadets are able to obtain their Glider Pilot License from Transport Canada at the end of their participation in the training.

=== International Air Cadet Exchange Program ===
The first successful exchange took place in 1947 with 46 cadets and two officers between the United Kingdom and Canada. The first exchange between Canada and the United States of America followed one year later. In subsequent years, Sweden and Canada exchanged cadets (1950), followed by Norwegian, Dutch and Danish cadets exchanging with Canada (1951).

The need to continue exchange flight training knowledge between countries saw the development of the International Air Cadet Exchange Program in the 1950s.

The International Air Cadet Exchange Program aims to promote friendship and understanding among participating countries and encourages cadets to focus on international affairs.

=== National Effective Speaking Program ===
Cadets are provided an opportunity to increase their self-confidence, their ability to reason, and their ability to organize and express ideas. Cadets can participate in this annual program at the local level in their squadron and compete at a regional, provincial and national level. The participating cadets prepare a 5-minute speech from a list of topics approved by the National Effective Speaking Committee and are asked to deliver a 3-minute impromptu speech while at the competition. The winning cadet is awarded a medal, a gift and a certificate of participation.

=== Awards and scholarships ===
The Air Cadet League of Canada along with various partners have many scholarships and awards that are offered to Royal Canadian Air Cadets.

Name
Continuation Flying Training Awards
Royal Canadian Legion Air Cadet of the Year Award
Air Cadet League Annual Music Awards for Excellence
Pilot Training Achievements Awards
The Young Citizens Foundation Scholarship
Birchall Scholarship
Dale Scholarship
Alex Venables Scholarship in Engineering
KC Lett Scholarship
Air Cadet League of Canada Foundation Scholarships
Thomas Colfer Scholarship
Dr. William Weston Scholarship
CAE Limited Scholarship
Anthony A. Martin Memorial Scholarship
Royal Canadian Air Force Association Scholarship
National Air Cadet League Advisory Council Scholarship
National Legion Foundation Scholarship
Lockheed Martin Scholarship

== Careers and industry influence ==
The Air Cadet League hosts the Triple AAA Career Expo with various industry partners, educators, trainers and companies related to aviation. Some notable graduated Air Cadets are Chris Hadfield and Jeremy R. Hansen. The partnerships with various related organizations and industry organizations mean cadets have access to many opportunities in aviation and aerospace. Most careers in this industry are in manufacturing, maintenance, repair and overhaul.

== ACLC in film ==
Considered a lost film by the National Film Board of Canada, director Jane Marsh produced Air Cadets on May 25, 1944, that profiled the inner workings of the Air Cadet movement.

== Recognition ==
Canada's Aviation Hall of Fame – Awarded – Belt of Orion Awards for Excellence – 1989

== See also ==
- List of Canadian organizations with royal patronage
- Cadets Canada – corporate identity
- Canadian Forces
- History of the Cadet Instructors Cadre
