= Proudly She Marches =

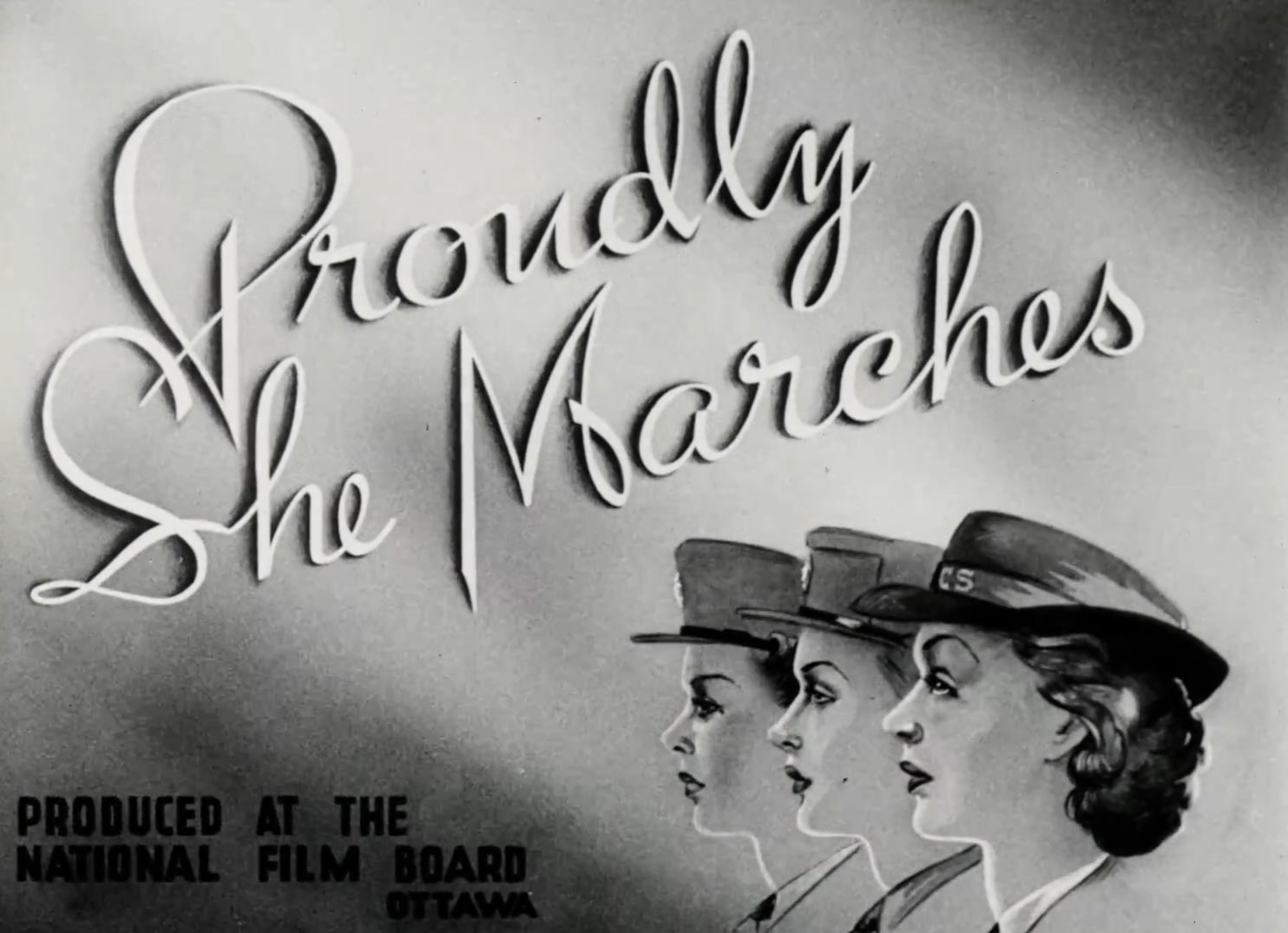
- Opening title
- Directed by: Jane Marsh
- Produced by: Raymond Spottiswoode
- Starring: Gudrun Bjerring; Joan Hunter; Jane Irwin; Shirley Jackson
- Music by: Louis Applebaum
- Production company: National Film Board of Canada
- Distributed by: Columbia Pictures of Canada
- Release date: 1943
- Running time: 18 minutes
- Country: Canada
- Language: English

Proudly She Marches is an 18-minute 1943 Canadian documentary film, made by the National Film Board of Canada (NFB) as part of the wartime Canada Carries On series. The film, directed by Jane Marsh and produced by Raymond Spottiswoode, described the work of Canadian women in uniform during the Second World War. The film's French version is titled Carrières de femmes.

== Synopsis ==
In 1943, Canadian women are making a significant contribution to the military, disproving the old saw, "in the home women are good for everything, outside it, good for nothing." Other misconceptions about women's frailty, subservience to men and devotion to the pursuit of beauty have been in place for centuries. In modern times, when war came to Canada, Canadian women answered the call.

Women signed up in the Canadian Women's Army Corps (CWAC), the Royal Canadian Air Force (RCAF) Woman's Division (WD) and the Women's Royal Canadian Naval Service (CWREN), taking on jobs that relieved men for combat duty. All new recruits went through the usual four-week basic training program, preparing them for military life. The everyday life in the forces included barracks living, marching and specialized gas-mask drills, eating at the mess hall, and even recreation opportunities. Once basic training was over, women began to learn to handle many kinds of work.

In the RCAF, women became clerks, drivers, photographers, air photo interpreters, weather observers, instrument mechanics, parachute riggers as well as staffing many administrative and technical positions. As part of the CWAC, women took over 21 types of army duties as secretaries, clerks, canteen workers, vehicle drivers and many other non-combat military jobs. As CWREN personnel, women served in 26 non-combatant occupations in Canadian naval bases at home or abroad. These jobs included cipher duties, clerical work, teleprinter operations, telephone switchboard operator, wireless telegraphic operator, coder duties, cook, steward, messenger, elevator operator and motor transport driver.

All of the roles that Canadian women undertook in military service added to the immense contribution of women to Canada's fighting strength in the Second World War.

== Cast ==
- Crown Princess Juliana of the Netherlands
- Prince Bernhard of the Netherlands
- Dorothy Brennan, RCAF photographer
- Myra Lockridge, RCAF instructor
- RCAF Sergeant Bill McNaughton
- Cécile Levesque, CWREN drafting technician
- Helen Adamson, CWREN map plotter
- Catherine Storey, CWREN drafting technician

== Production ==
Typical of the NFB's Second World War documentary short films in the Canada Carries On series, Proudly She Marches was made in cooperation with the Director of Public Information, Herbert Lash. The film was created as a morale boosting propaganda film with another purpose, to dramatically depict women's changing roles in society. "This film ['Proudly She Marches'], made ostensibly to encourage female recruitment, concluded with positive observations about women in the present and future. Unfortunately, the female narrator was replaced by a male to make the points." (Note: After a final disagreement with NFB director John Grierson, who refused to let a woman head his Canada Carries On series, Marsh resigned from the NFB in 1944.)

Proudly She Marches was a compilation documentary that relied heavily on newsreel material but also included original footage shot at military bases in Canada to provide the background to the dialogue. The unusual use of intertitles similar to those used in silent film, overlaid over film images, provided onscreen dialogue for the audience.

== Reception ==
From an interview of Janey Martin, one of actors in Proudly She Marches, The Globe and Mail reporter in 1943, at the film's premiere, noted that she was "... chosen to represent the Women's Royal Canadian Naval Service in a National Film Board production which is a story of Canadian women in the air force, army and navy. Janey [Martin] has a featured role in 'Proudly She Marches', which is being shown in theatres across Canada now and for the next three months. Is she excited? No! ... The slim blonde naval typist from Windsor would rather be a WREN than a movie star, though she has qualifications for both positions. She considers herself quite an ordinary WREN, doing an ordinary sort of job, and coming from an ordinary background. But her part in the film is definitely more than ordinary ..."

Proudly She Marches was produced in 35 mm for the theatrical market. Each film was shown over a six-month period as part of the shorts or newsreel segments in approximately 800 theatres across Canada. The NFB had an arrangement with Famous Players theatres to ensure that Canadians from coast-to-coast could see them, with further distribution by Columbia Pictures.

After the six-month theatrical tour ended, individual films were made available on 16 mm to schools, libraries, churches and factories, extending the life of these films for another year or two. They were also made available to film libraries operated by university and provincial authorities. A total of 199 films were produced before the series was canceled in 1959.

Historian Malek Khouri analyzed the role of the NFB wartime documentaries with Women Are Warriors characterized as an example of a propaganda film. "During the early years of the NFB, its creative output was largely informed by the turbulent political and social climate the world was facing. World War II, Communism, unemployment, the role of labour unions, and working conditions were all subjects featured by the NFB during the period from 1939 to 1946". Khouri further stated: "As they made a case for the importance of women's contribution to the war industry, the message in NFB films such as 'Proudly She Marches' ... was that this work would be merely temporary. The film even hints that such line of activity (e.g., working in heavy industries or as military personnel) is 'unnatural' for women."

== See also ==
- The Home Front (1940), a NFB documentary on the role of women on the home front in the Second World War
- Rosies of the North (1999), a NFB documentary on the Canadian Car and Foundry in the Second World War
- Wings on her Shoulder (1943), a NFB documentary on the Royal Canadian Air Force Women's Division in the Second World War
- Women Are Warriors (1942), a NFB documentary on Canadian women in military service in the Second World War
