= Laura Gamble =

Canadian nurse

- Born: 4 September 1887
- Died: 1939 (aged 51–52)
- Military career
- Allegiance: Canada
- Branch: Canadian Expeditionary Force
- Service years: 1915–1919
- Rank: Sister
- Unit: Canadian Army Medical Corps
- Conflicts: First World War
- Awards: Associate Royal Red Cross

Laura Gamble, ARRC (4 September 1887 – 1939) was a Canadian nurse who served in the Canadian Army Medical Corps during the First World War.

== Nursing career ==
A 1910 alumna of the Toronto General Hospital School of Nursing, Gamble joined the Canadian Army Medical Corps as a nursing sister, enlisting on May 4, 1915. She expected that her experience in a Toronto hospital would be an asset to the war effort. She served on a hospital ship in the Mediterranean, and at hospitals in Greece, France, and the United Kingdom. She arrived on the Greek island of Lemnos after the Anglo-French force had already suffered heavy casualties as a result of the ill-fated Gallipoli campaign.

Canadian nurses were the only nurses of the British Empire's armies that held the rank of officers. Gamble was awarded the Royal Red Cross 2nd class in 1917 for her show of "greatest possible tact and extreme devotion to duty". This was presented to her at Buckingham Palace during a special ceremony for Canadian nurses. She also received the British War Medal and Victory Medal.

Gamble was recalled to Canada after the war and served as matron of St. Andrew's Military Hospital, Toronto. She was among the first nurses to take a new course in public health from the University of Toronto and worked for the Toronto Department of Public Health as Acting District Superintendent.

The diary Gamble kept during the war is conserved at the Library and Archives Canada in Ottawa.
