= Wings on Her Shoulder =

- Theatrical poster
- Directed by: Jane Marsh
- Narrated by: Lorne Greene
- Music by: Lucio Agostini
- Production company: National Film Board of Canada
- Distributed by: United Artists; National Film Board of Canada
- Release date: 1943
- Running time: 10 minutes, 47 seconds
- Country: Canada
- Language: English

Wings on Her Shoulder is a 10-minute 1943 Canadian documentary film, made by the National Film Board of Canada (NFB) as part of the NFB's The World in Action series. The film, directed by Jane Marsh, depicts the role of the Woman's Division in the Royal Canadian Air Force (RCAF) during the Second World War, who freed up men for flying duties.

== Synopsis ==
As the Second World War continues, the Canadian contribution to the Allied bombing campaign over occupied Europe requires more aviators. The government responds by creating the Royal Canadian Air Force Women's Division in 1941. By 1943, 9,000 recruits, women from all backgrounds, are taking over a wide range of jobs.

Women in the RCAF, or WDs as they were called, were clerks, drivers, photographers, air photo interpreters, weather observers, instrument mechanics, parachute riggers as well as many administrative and technical positions in the RCAF. While most WDs were located at British Commonwealth Air Training Plan stations across Canada, many others served overseas with RCAF Overseas Headquarters and No. 6 (Bomber) Group in England. The skills they learned would also serve the women well as they would eventually enter a postwar world. (Note: Their motto was: "We serve that men may fly.")

== Production ==
Typical of the NFB's wartime series of documentary short films, Wings on Her Shoulder relied heavily on military assistance in obtaining footage. The film incorporated stock footage shot over a period of time from 1941 to 1943. While the aerial sequences were limited to available footage, some of the aerial scenes were shot in Canada and carefully edited with other footage obtained from the British Ministry of Information.

=== Aircraft in the film ===
The RCAF aircraft in Wings on her Shoulder encompassed many of the types used in Bomber and Fighter Commands, by the RCAF in 1943, including:

- Avro Manchester medium bomber
- Avro Lancaster heavy bomber
- Boeing Fortress Mk I heavy bomber
- Bristol Beaufighter fighter
- Bristol Blenheim light bomber
- Douglas Digby medium bomber/coastal patrol
- Hawker Hurricane fighter/fighter-bomber
- Short Stirling heavy bomber

== Reception ==
As part of the NFB's The World in Action newsreel series, Wings on Her Shoulder was produced for both the military and the theatrical market. Each film was shown over a six-month period as part of the shorts or newsreel segments in approximately 800 theatres across Canada. The NFB also had an arrangement with United Artists to ensure that newsreels would get a wider release in North America.

After the six-month theatrical tour ended, individual films were made available on 16 mm, to schools, libraries, churches and factories, extending the life of these films for another year or two. They were also made available to film libraries operated by university and provincial authorities. Available from the National Film Board either online or as a DVD, Wings on her Shoulder is one of the few wartime NFB films that explored the role of women at war.

Historian Malek Khouri analyzed the role of the NFB wartime documentaries with Wings on her Shoulder characterized as an example of a propaganda film. "During the early years of the NFB, its creative output was largely informed by the turbulent political and social climate the world was facing. World War II, Communism, unemployment, the role of labour unions, and working conditions were all subjects featured by the NFB during the period from 1939 to 1946".

The "destabilizing" role of women depicted in Wings on Her Shoulder also showed an acceptance of a new role to come in postwar years. In an examination of the role of the NFB in wartime, historian George Evans observed: "If contemporary feminists sense omissions and patronizing in the film, one must at least acknowledge that [Wings on her Shoulder] expressed a positive attitude to working women and was conditioning audiences to become accustomed to new and permanent women's roles in the workplace."
