= Royal Canadian Air Force Women's Division =

Element of the Royal Canadian Air Force during the Second World War

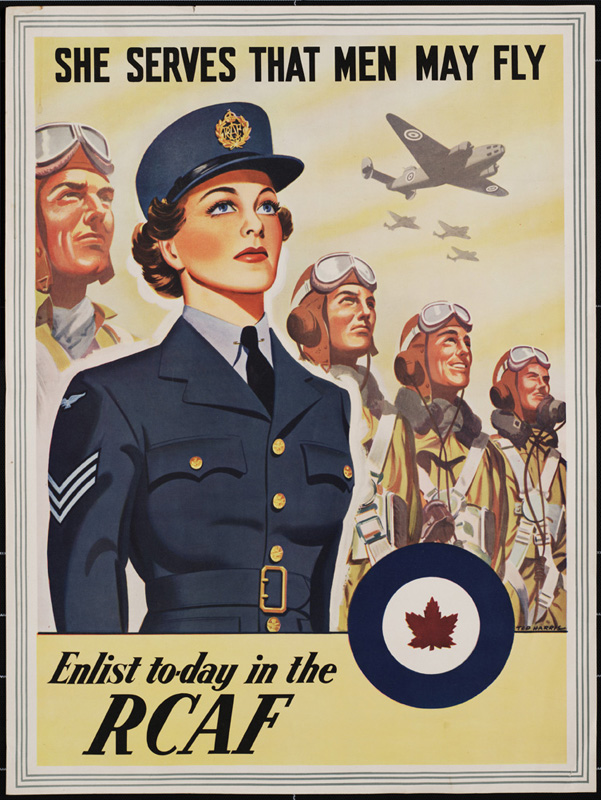
- RCAF Women's Division recruiting poster
- Active: 1941–1946
- Disbanded: December 1946
- Country: Canada
- Branch: Royal Canadian Air Force
- Role: Operational support. Various duties.
- Size: 17,038 personnel
- Nickname: "WD"
- Motto: We Serve That Men May Fly

Commanders
- Honorary Air Commandant: Princess Alice, Countess of Athlone
- Notable commanders: Wing Officer Wilhelmina (Willa) Walker

Insignia
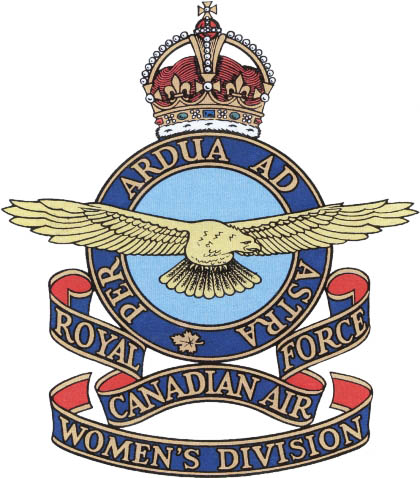
- RCAF Women's Division badge

The Royal Canadian Air Force Women's Division was a non-combatant element of the Royal Canadian Air Force (RCAF) which was active during the Second World War. The Women's Division's original role was to replace male air force personnel so that they would be available for combat-related duties. First called the Canadian Women's Auxiliary Air Force (CWAAF), the name changed to Royal Canadian Air Force Women's Division in February 1942. Women's Division personnel were commonly known as WDs.

The RCAF was the first branch of the Canadian armed services to actively recruit women.

== History ==
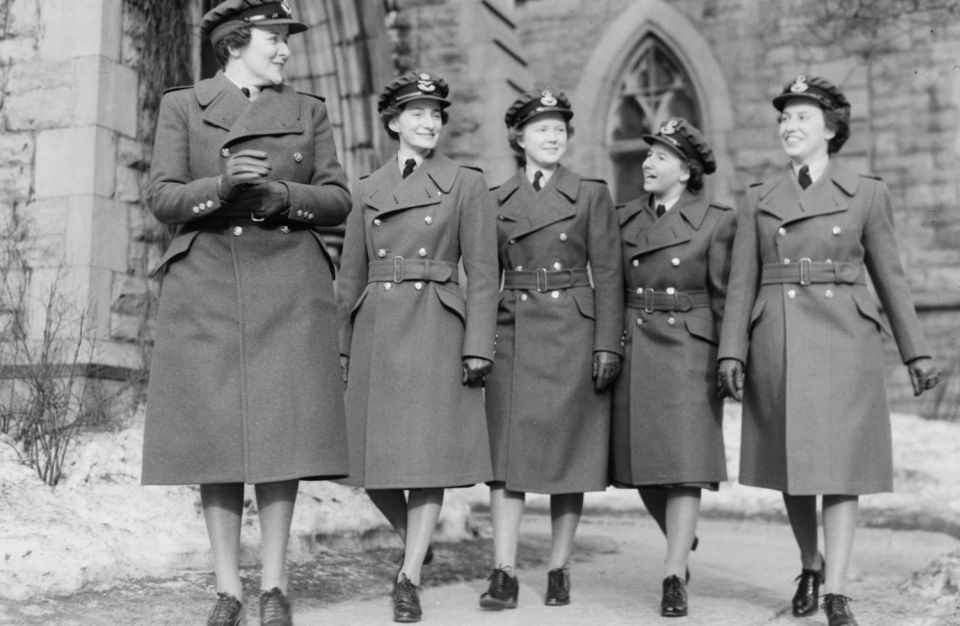
Women of the Canadian Women's Auxiliary Air Force (CWAAF), 1941. The CWAAF was changed to the RCAF Women's Division in February, 1942.

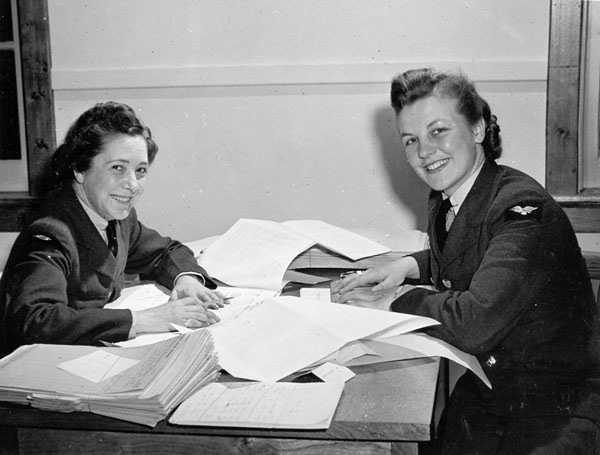
Timekeeping personnel of the RCAF Women's Division, No. 2 Service Flying Training School, RCAF Station Uplands, 1942

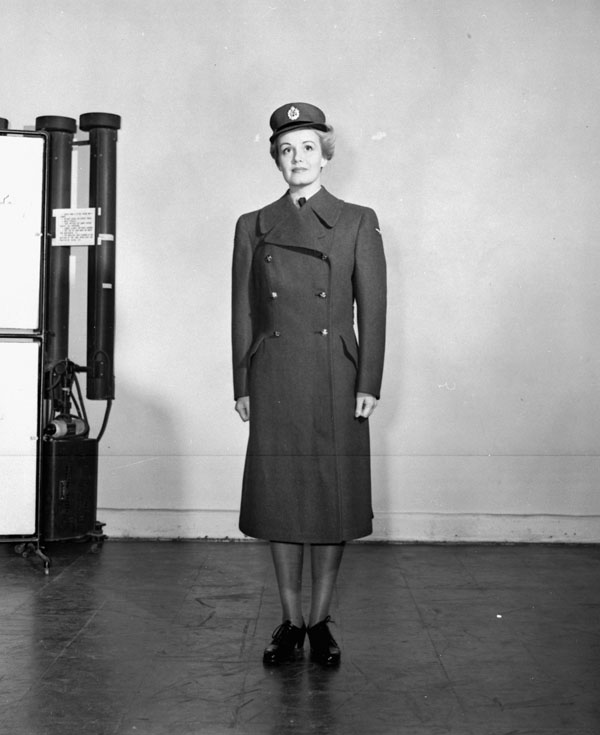
Women's Division airwoman modelling WD uniform. RCAF Station Rockcliffe, Ontario, 1942

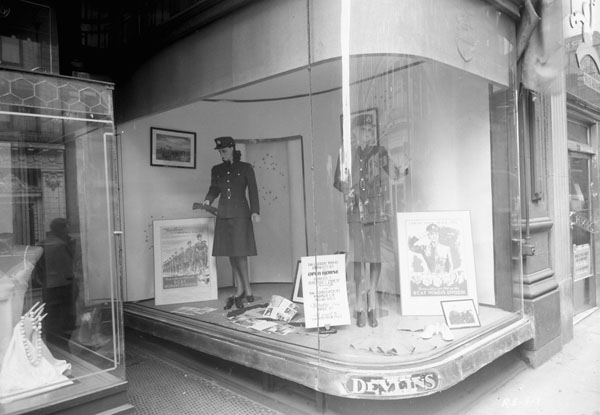
Devlin's department store window display of RCAF Women's Division uniforms with recruiting posters, Ottawa, Ontario, 1943

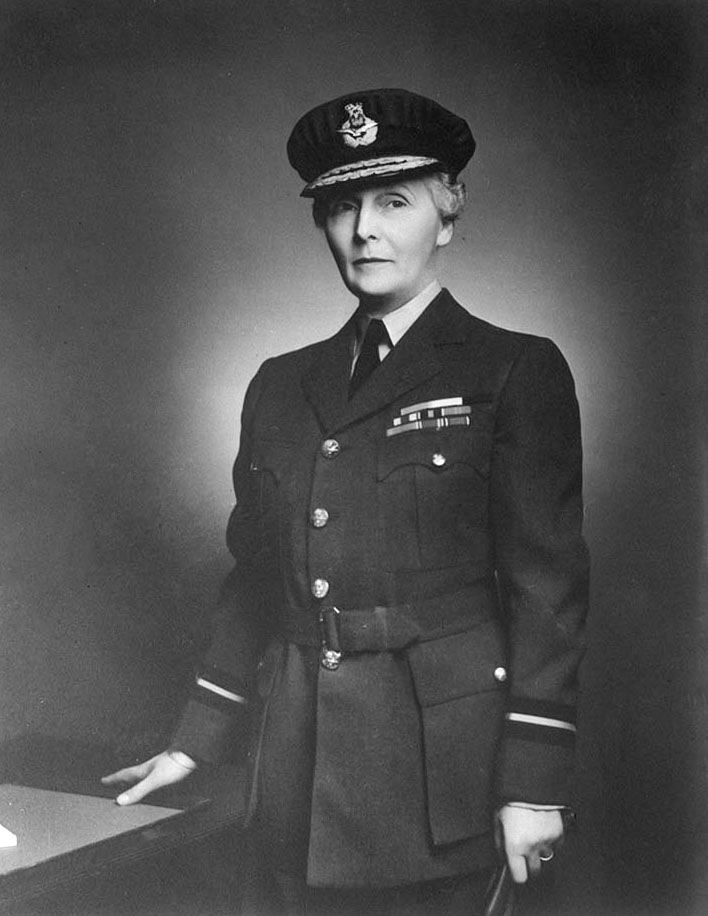
Princess Alice, Countess of Athlone, wearing a Royal Canadian Air Force uniform. Princess Alice was Honorary Air Commandant of the Women's Division.

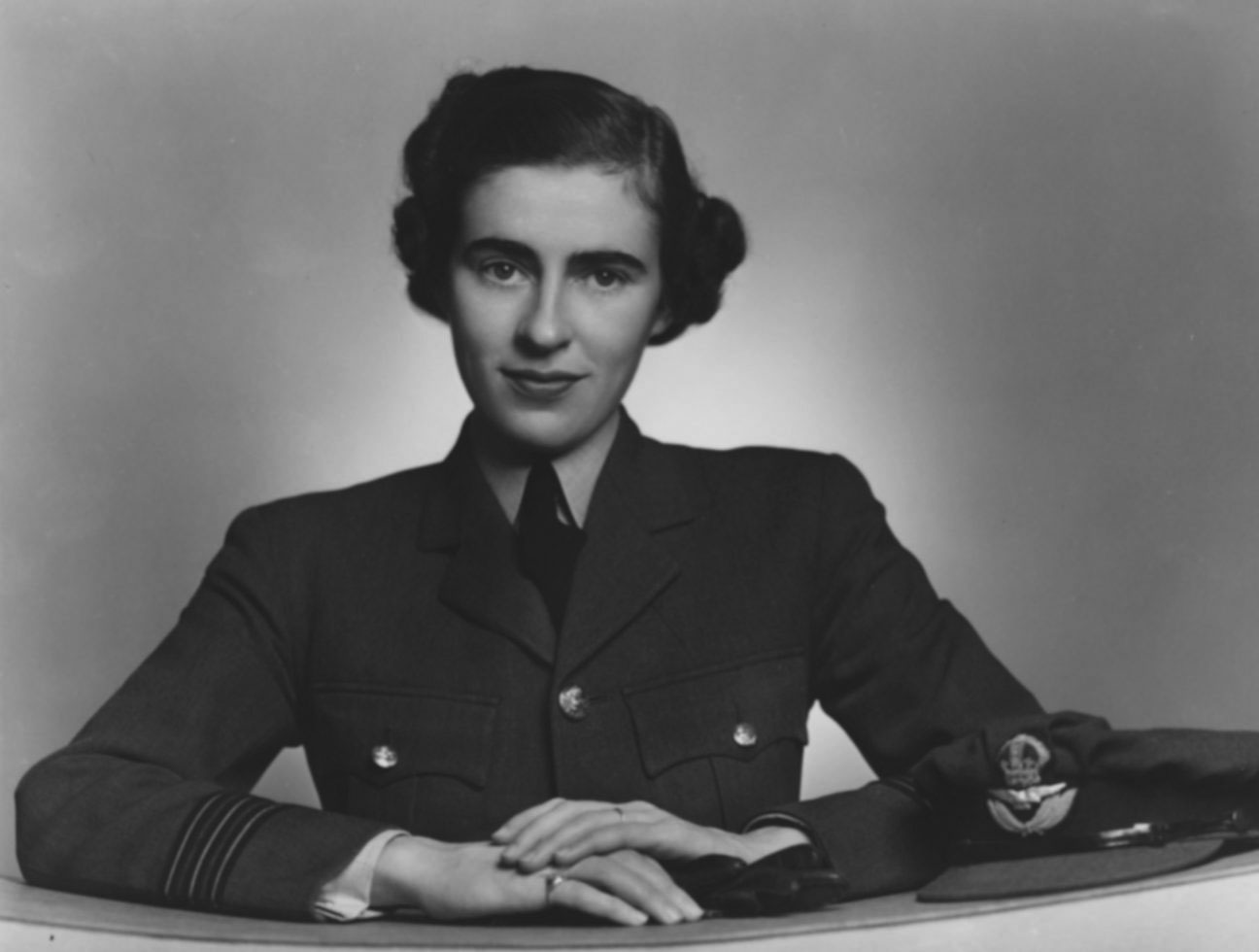
Wilhelmina (Willa) Walker was the Commander of the Women's Division.

At the beginning of the war, Canadian women began pressing for the right to be allowed to join the war effort. This, along with manpower shortages, led to the air force conceding that women could help the war effort by taking over many men's duties with the aim of freeing up men for work that was directly related to combat. The Royal Air Force suggested that the RCAF form its own women's unit much like the RAF Women's Auxiliary Air Force (WAAF). In June 1941, the government formally decided to allow the enlistment of women in the armed services. The order-in-council, issued on 2 July 1941, authorized "the formation of a component of the Royal Canadian Air Force to be known as the Canadian Women's Auxiliary Air Force, its function being to release to heavier duties those members of the RCAF employed in administrative, clerical and other comparable types of service employment".

The CWAAF was modelled on and structured like the Royal Air Force Women's Auxiliary Air Force. To assist with the organizing of the new RCAF women's unit, several WAAF officers were temporarily loaned by the RAF. Since the CWAAF became an integral part of the RCAF, another order-in-council changed the CWAAF to the RCAF Women's Division (WD) on 3 February 1942.

Originally, only nine trades were open to women; however, duties expanded as the war progressed and 69 trades became available. Among the many jobs carried out by WD personnel, they became clerks, telephone operators, drivers, fabric workers, hairdressers, hospital assistants, instrument mechanics, parachute riggers, photographers, air photo interpreters, intelligence officers, instructors, weather observers, pharmacists, Wireless operators, and Service Police. RCAF regulations at the time precluded women who possessed flying licences from flight instructing or front-line duty. Most WDs were located at British Commonwealth Air Training Plan and RAF training stations across Canada and Newfoundland, many served in Canadian operational stations, some served in the United States and many were posted overseas with RCAF Overseas Headquarters and No. 6 (bomber) Group.

Princess Alice, Countess of Athlone, wife of Governor General the Earl of Athlone, was Honorary Air Commandant of the Women's Division.

A total of 17,038 women served with the Women's Division before it was discontinued in December 1946. Twenty WDs received the BEM, 12 officers received the MBE, and one officer, Dr. Jean Davey, was awarded the OBE. Twenty-eight WDs died during the war from various causes.

A memorial dedicated to the Women's Division was placed at CFB Trenton in 2009. The inscription reads: "We Serve That Men May Fly" "Dedicated to more than 17,000 women who served in the Royal Canadian Air Force Women's Division 1941–1946".

Women were again permitted to enter the RCAF in 1951 when the air force was expanding to cover Canada's NATO commitments. Women were accepted as military pilots in 1980, and Canada became the first Western country to allow women to be fighter pilots in 1988.

== Recruitment ==
Newspapers and radio were used for publicity. Many recruits were attracted by recruiting posters and pamphlets, and many were influenced by a WD precision squad that travelled across Canada. Officers also travelled across Canada to encourage recruitment. Tours of WD facilities were arranged. Films such as Proudly She Marches publicized the Women's Division, and photographs of WDs in uniform taken by Ottawa photographer Yousuf Karsh attracted interest.

At first, 150 women, slated to be officers and NCOs, were specially selected for having the necessary qualifications judged on character, intelligence, leadership potential, and ability to take responsibility. They were expected to have experience in business or social work and with working with people, and have organizing ability. The women chosen were the very best of applicants; 70% of them had some high school education and 7% had been to university. The criteria were more demanding since they were going to be the leaders of the Women's Division.

For general recruitment, women had to be between 21 and 41 years old, had to pass medical tests, be at least five feet tall, have a normal weight, must have been accepted to high school, be able to pass a trade aptitude test, be of good character, not be married with children under her care, and not hold a permanent civil service appointment.

== Training ==
Selected recruits were sent to manning depot where they learned "drill, deportment, discipline, service customs, etiquette [and the] king's regulations". Selection for trade training was also handled at the manning depot. Some of the trades that were taught at various locations across Canada included meteorology, food preparation, air traffic control, parachute rigging, photo interpretation, photography, typing, administration, wireless operation, and police work.

== Living conditions ==
Most WDs lived in barracks, each wing of which typically accommodated approximately 68 women. WDs who worked at Air Force Headquarters in Ottawa lived in a barrack block that housed up to 800 airwomen. The barracks weren't well insulated. During winter some had to sleep with their uniforms to keep warm while some found unusual ways to insulate their mattresses such as using newspapers. In locations such as cities where government housing was not available, personnel would live in private accommodations and receive an allowance to pay for room, board, and transportation.

Baseball, basketball, and hockey were popular. Women had their own team when there was enough of them on a base, otherwise, they would join the men's team. Depending on station facilities, other activities included golfing, horseback riding, track and field, skiing, swimming, tennis, and skating. Annual summer sports days were arranged to promote "healthy minds in healthy bodies". Bases often organized dances, musical concerts, talent shows and showed films.

== Uniform ==
The Women's Division uniform was based on the British WAAF uniform. The kit consisted of a blue-grey ("air force blue") tunic and skirt, blue shirt, black necktie, greatcoat, rain coat, black shoes, navy blue cardigan, blue smock, overshoes, lisle grey stockings, gloves, khaki coveralls, grey shorts, tee shirt, summer dress, rank badges and a cap with a pleated crown. A battle dress uniform was issued to those who would be exposed to bad weather. In some instances, lined ski pants, parka, and winter cap with ear flaps were issued. Airwomen who served outside Canada wore a "Canada" flash on the shoulders.

The uniform changed somewhat in 1943. The new uniform, which was meant to be primarily worn off the stations, added a pleat to the greatcoat and the skirt was changed to a six-gore pattern. The pleated tunic pockets were replaced with flat patch pockets below and false pockets above, and the belt became detachable. A blue leatherette shoulder bag was added. The cap was replaced with one with a kepi-style with a deep visor and higher stiffened front.

The summer uniform consisted of a blue short-sleeved cotton dress with brass buttons. This was eventually replaced with a light khaki uniform based on the new blue (winter) uniform.

== Ranks ==
The Royal Canadian Air Force Women's Division's rank structure was modelled on that of the Royal Air Force's WAAF. Ranks are listed with the most senior rank at the top and are compared with regular RCAF ranks.

RCAF WD Rank	RCAF equivalent
Air Chief Commandant	Air Vice-Marshal
Air Commandant	Air Commodore
Group Officer	Group Captain
Wing Officer	Wing Commander
Squadron Officer	Squadron Leader
Flight Officer	Flight Lieutenant
Section Officer	Flying Officer
Assistant Section Officer	Pilot Officer
Under Officer 1st Class	Warrant Officer Class 1
Under Officer 2nd Class	Warrant Officer Class 2
Flight Sergeant	Flight Sergeant
Sergeant	Sergeant
Corporal	Corporal
Leading Aircraftwoman	Leading Aircraftman
Aircraftwoman 1st Class	Aircraftman 1st Class
Aircraftwoman 2nd Class	Aircraftman 2nd Class

== See also ==
- Canadian Women's Army Corps
- Women's Royal Canadian Naval Service
- Women's Auxiliary Australian Air Force (Royal Australian Air Force)
- New Zealand Women's Auxiliary Air Force
- Jean Lee (aircraftwoman) - the only Chinese Canadian woman to serve (as a WD) during the Second World War.
