= Bell-Irving =

Bell-Irving is a surname, and may refer to:

- Alan Duncan Bell-Irving (1894–1965), Canadian First World War flying ace
- Henry Pybus Bell-Irving (1913–2002), 23rd Lieutenant Governor of British Columbia
- J. J. Bell-Irving (1859–1936), Scottish businessman in Hong Kong and China
- Roderick Ogle Bell-Irving (1891–1918), Canadian army officer
