= ANAF =

ANAF may refer to:

- National Agency for Fiscal Administration, a Romanian government agency
- Army, Navy and Air Force Veterans in Canada
