= Sea Cadet Service Medal =

Canadian youth award

- Obverse and reverse of the Sea Cadet Service Medal
- Type: Cadet service medal
- Country: Canada
- Presented by: Ship's commanding officer
- Eligibility: Any sea cadet with 4 years of service within the CCO
- Ribbon: Azure, or, argent, vert, argent, or, azure
- Undress ribbon

The Sea Cadet Service Medal is a Canadian Sea Cadet medal, which is awarded to Cadets who have completed at least four years of continuous service in the Canadian Cadet Organization. Recipients of the Sea Cadet Service Medal must be in the sea element at the time of receiving the award, though time spent in army or air cadets also counts towards the award. Time spent in other Royal Canadian Sea Cadet corps also counts towards the medal. Cadets can only receive one service medal, even if they have spent a total of four years in sea, army and air cadets.

This medal is not part of the Canadian Honours System and should only be worn on cadet uniforms.

== Application process ==
While the application process varies on a corps-by-corps basis, Cadets must be nominated by a member of their local supporting branch of the Navy League of Canada. This can be done using the Navy League form NL(104)E, and the application must be approved at both the local and divisional levels.

== Medal specifics ==
The Sea Cadet Service Medal consists of a silver-coloured medal with the insignia of an anchor, and the words "For Service" written over and "Pour Service" written under. The ribbon is blue, yellow, white and green. A silver-coloured bar with fouled anchor is awarded for an additional year of service, and a bar with two anchors is awarded for an additional two years of service after being awarded the Sea Cadet Service Medal.
