= Alan Duncan Bell-Irving =

Canadian flying ace

- Born: 28 August 1894; Vancouver, British Columbia, Canada
- Died: 24 April 1965 (aged 70); West Vancouver, British Columbia, Canada
- Relatives: Roderick Ogle Bell-Irving (brother); Henry Pybus Bell-Irving (nephew)
- Military career
- Allegiance: Canada; United Kingdom (Note: Canadians were required to complete an Attestation Paper in which they declared an oath of allegiance to King George V, and agreed to serve in any arm of the service for the duration of the war between Great Britain and Germany.)
- Branch: Canadian Expeditionary Force; Royal Flying Corps; Royal Canadian Air Force
- Service years: 1914–1919; 1939–1945
- Rank: Air Commodore
- Units: 16th Battalion (Canadian Scottish); Gordon Highlanders; No. 7 Squadron RFC; No.60 Squadron RFC
- Awards: Military Cross & Bar; Croix de Guerre (France)

Air Commodore Alan Duncan Bell-Irving MC & Bar (28 August 1894 – 24 April 1965) was a Canadian First World War flying ace credited with seven aerial victories while serving in the British Royal Flying Corps. He also served in the Royal Canadian Air Force during the Second World War.

== Family and education ==
Alan Duncan Bell-Irving was one of nine children (the fifth of five sons) born to Henry Ogle Bell-Irving and his wife Marie Ysabel "Bella" del Carmen Beattie. His father, "H.O.", as he was generally known, was born at "Milkbank", the Bell-Irvings' ancestral home near Lockerbie, Scotland, the son of a merchant, and initially trained as a civil engineer, before going to Canada in 1882 to become a surveyor-engineer for the Canadian Pacific Railway. After three years he moved to the town of Granville, which would soon become the city of Vancouver. In 1890 he founded the Anglo-British Columbia Packing Company Ltd., which soon became "the world's No. 1 producer of sockeye salmon", and made the Bell-Irving's one of the wealthiest families in Vancouver. He also served as Chairman of the Board of Works, President of the St. Andrew's and Caledonian Society, and was for two years (1895 to 1897) President of the Board of Trade.

Alan Bell-Irving was educated locally and then, like his father and brothers, was sent to the Loretto School, in Musselburgh, Scotland, where he served in the Officers Training Corps and represented his school at cricket against Fettes on 10 and 11 July 1914.

The Bell-Irvings met the outbreak of the war with patriotic enthusiasm, and by November 1914 five of the six brothers had enlisted, with the sixth doing so later. All six became officers and were decorated for bravery, and all but one survived the war. Major Roderick Ogle Bell-Irving DSO, MC, was killed in action on 1 October 1918, only weeks before the armistice, while serving in the 16th Battalion (Canadian Scottish), Canadian Expeditionary Force, and is buried in Éterpigny British Cemetery.

== World War I ==
Alan Bell-Irving signed attestation papers on 24 September 1914 at Valcartier, Quebec, and was posted to the 16th Battalion (Canadian Scottish). He was commissioned as a second lieutenant (on probation) in the 3rd Battalion, Gordon Highlanders on 22 January 1915, and was confirmed in his rank on 22 June 1915.

On 22 November 1915 Bell-Irving was seconded to the Royal Flying Corps, as a flying officer (observer) in No. 7 Squadron RFC. However, he must have serving in this role before that date as he was shot down in September 1915, escaping unscathed. He was wounded in action on 14 December.

After recovering from his injuries he trained as a pilot, being granted Royal Aero Club Aviator's Certificate No. 2664 after soloing a Maurice Farman biplane at the Military School, Farnborough, on 31 March 1916. He was promoted to the temporary rank of lieutenant the next day, 1 April, and on 15 May was appointed a flying officer.

Bell-Irving was posted to No. 60 Squadron RFC, to fly the Morane-Saulnier N single-seater scout from Vert Galand airfield, near Amiens, France, and received a regimental promotion to lieutenant in the Gordon Highlanders on 11 July 1916. He shot down his first enemy aircraft on his twenty-second birthday, 28 August 1916, destroying a Roland two-seater reconnaissance aircraft over Bapaume. His squadron was then re-equipped with Nieuport 17 fighter aircraft, and on 14 September, he shot down an enemy observation balloon at low level over Avesnes-lès-Bapaume, and was subsequently awarded the Military Cross on 20 October 1916. His citation read:

Second Lieutenant (Temporary Lieutenant) Alan Duncan Bell-Irving, Gordon Highlanders, Special Reserve, and Royal Flying Corps.

"For gallantry and skill in attacking a hostile balloon at 1,000 feet under heavy fire and bringing it down in flames. On a previous occasion he brought down a hostile machine."

On 23 September 1916 he shot down his second enemy aircraft, another Roland two-seater, over Croisilles. He gained his fourth and fifth aerial victories, which made him an ace, on 30 September 1916, shooting down two Roland two-seaters in flames over Villers-au-Flos. He gained his two final victories on 15 October, destroying and driving down two two-seaters over Ervillers. He was shot down again on 21 October 1916, but again escaped unhurt, managing to crash-land his aircraft among the British trenches.

On 3 November 1916 he was appointed a flight commander with the temporary rank of captain, but on 9 November he was shot down a third time, by Otto Höhne, and severely wounded in the legs, ending his active combat career.

On 9 January 1917 Bell-Irving was awarded a Bar to his Military Cross. His citation read:

Second Lieutenant (Temporary Lieutenant) Alan Duncan Bell-Irving, M.C., Gordon Highlanders, Special Reserve, and Royal Flying Corps.

"For conspicuous gallantry in action. He displayed great courage and skill when escorting a bombing raid. He engaged several enemy machines and drove them off. Afterwards, although his own machine was damaged, he continued to fight against superior numbers of the enemy."

On 1 May 1917 Bell-Irving received permission to wear the Croix de Guerre conferred on him by France, and on 15 June he was promoted to captain in the Gordon Highlanders.

Bell-Irving's injuries prevented him from returning to front line service, but he served at, and eventually commanded the School of Special Flying at Gosport. On 31 January 1918 he was appointed a squadron commander with the temporary rank of major, with seniority from 1 October 1917. Later that year, when serving as Chief Flying Instructor at Gosport, he invented a non-electrical aircraft intercom system that became standard equipment in training aircraft. On 24 June 1919 Bell-Irving relinquished his commission owing to ill-health contracted on active service.

=== List of aerial victories ===
Combat record
No.	Date/Time	Aircraft/ Serial No.	Opponent	Result	Location
1	28 August 1916 @ 1840	Morane-Saulnier N (A166)	Roland C	Destroyed	Bapaume
2	14 September 1916 @ 1845	Nieuport 17 (A203)	Balloon	Destroyed	Avesnes-lès-Bapaume
3	23 September 1916 @ 1230	Nieuport 17 (A203)	Roland C.II	Destroyed	Croisilles
4	30 September 1916 @ 1040–1045	Nieuport 17 (A203)	Roland C	Destroyed in flames	Villers-au-Flos
5	30 September 1916 @ 1040–1045	Nieuport 17 (A203)	Roland C	Destroyed in flames	Villers-au-Flos
6	15 October 1916 @ 1200	Nieuport 17 (A203)	C	Destroyed	Ervillers
7	15 October 1916 @ 1200	Nieuport 17 (A203)	C	Out of control	Ervillers

== Later life ==
Bell-Irving returned to Vancouver, where on 5 August 1919 he married Mary E. Keith Falconer, daughter of Commander H. Pybus, RNR. He went into the insurance business until World War II, when he joined the Royal Canadian Air Force and served as the commanding officer of No. 1 Bombing and Gunnery School at Jarvis, and then the RCAF Central Flying School at Trenton, the hub of the British Commonwealth Air Training Plan. He ended the war with the rank of Air Commodore. He then went into the real estate business in Vancouver, finally dying there in 1965, aged 70.

In 1939 he played a pivotal role, along with Alfred William (Nick) Carter in forming the first Air Cadet Squadron in Canada, the 1601 Air Force Cadet Wing in Vancouver. This first Squadron continues to parade in Vancouver as the 111 Pegasus Squadron.

In 2010, 135 Squadron, Royal Canadian Air Cadets, was renamed 135 Bell-Irving Squadron, to mark his role as one of the founders of the Air Cadet program.
