= Royal Canadian Air Cadets =

Canadian national youth military program

- Cadets de l'Aviation royale du Canada
- Badge of the Royal Canadian Air Cadets
- Active: April 9, 1941 – present
- Country: Canada
- Branch: Air
- Type: Youth cadets organization
- Size: 570 squadrons (more than 26,000 cadets)
- Part of: Canadian Cadet Organizations
- Headquarters: Ottawa, Ontario, Canada
- Patron: Governor General of Canada
- Motto: To learn – to serve – to advance
- March: Quick: "RCAF March Past"

Commanders
- Current commander: Brigadier-General Jason Langelier
- Formation Chief Warrant Officer: Chief Warrant Officer Alex Ardnt

Insignia
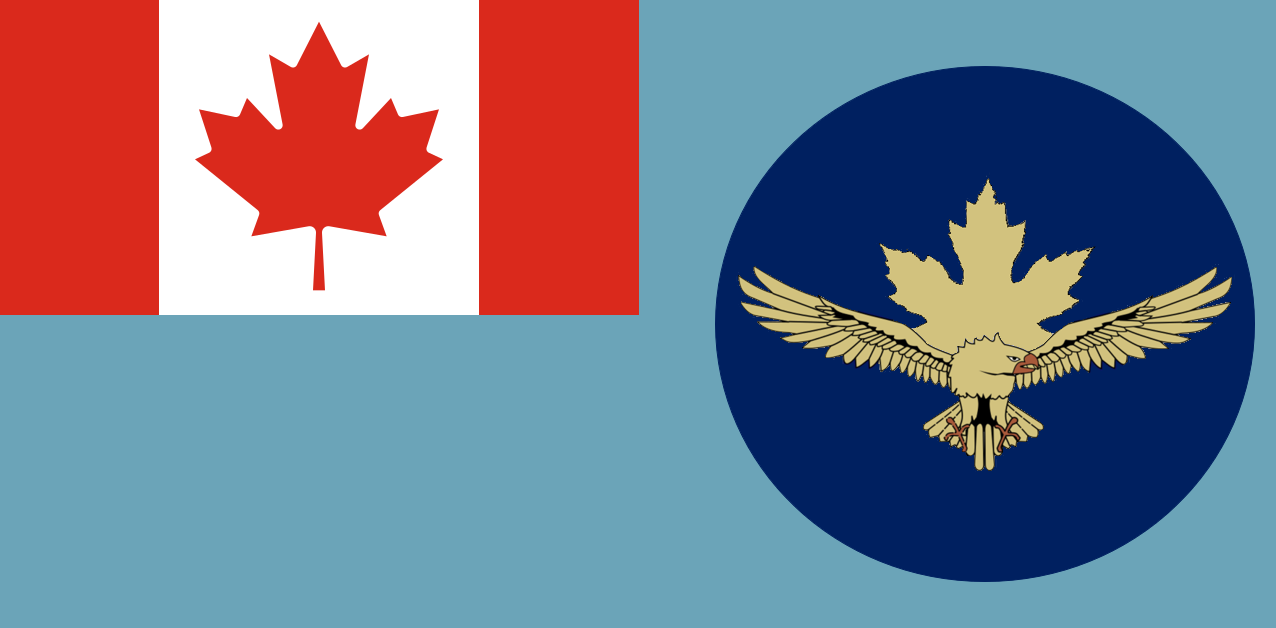
- Ensign

Aircraft flown
- Trainer: Schweizer SGS 2-33A, Cessna L-19, Cessna 182, Bellanca Scout, Cessna 172

The Royal Canadian Air Cadets (RCAC; French: Cadets de l'Aviation royale du Canada) is a Canadian national youth program for young individuals aged 12 to 18. Under the authority of the National Defence Act, the program is administered by the Canadian Armed Forces (CAF) and funded through the Department of National Defence (DND). Additional support is provided by the civilian Air Cadet League of Canada (ACLC). Together with the Royal Canadian Sea Cadets and Royal Canadian Army Cadets, it forms the "largest federally funded youth program in the country". Cadets are not members of the military and are not obliged to join the Canadian Armed Forces.

The first squadrons were established in 1941 to train young men for duties during World War II. Today the focus is on general aviation within the aim: "To instill in youth the attributes of good citizenship and leadership; promote physical fitness; and stimulate an interest in the activities of the Canadian Forces."

The majority of cadet training takes place at the local squadron during the regular school year, with a percentage of cadets selected for summer training courses across Canada. Central to the air cadet program are the gliding and flying courses offered to air cadets who qualify. One in five private pilots in Canada are former air cadets, and 67% of commercial and airline pilots began their careers as an air cadet. There are 454 squadrons located across the country with enrolment of over 26,000 Air Cadets.

== Overview ==
The aim of the Cadet Program is to develop in youth the attributes of good citizenship and leadership; promote physical fitness; and stimulate the interest of youth in the sea, land, and air activities of the Canadian Armed Forces; however, each focuses on its own parent element. The Air Cadet motto is "To learn. To serve. To advance.", and was created by Robert Myles Colwell in 1966 when he was a cadet with 625 Squadron in Perth-Andover, New Brunswick. In keeping with Commonwealth custom, the Royal Canadian Air Cadets stand last in the order of precedence, after the Royal Canadian Sea and Army Cadets.

Those aged 12 to 18 (inclusive) may become an air cadet. The organization and rank structure of the Royal Canadian Air Force is used with the exceptions of flight corporal (in place of master corporal), flight sergeant (in place of warrant officer), warrant officer 2nd class (in place of master warrant officer) and warrant officer 1st class (in place of chief warrant officer), which were the RCAF ranks from 1948 to 1968, with the exception of flight corporal. Cadets are not members of the Canadian Armed Forces, and there is no expectation for cadets to join the Canadian Armed Forces upon graduation from the program, though cadets who do go on to join the Canadian Armed Forces may be granted up to 180 days of incentive credit towards the Private IPC 2 pay category.

Adult leadership is provided by members of the Canadian Forces Reserve subcomponent Cadet Organizations Administration and Training Service, composed mostly of officers of the Cadet Instructors Cadre (CIC) and supplemented, if necessary, by contracted civilian instructors, authorized civilian volunteers, and, on occasion, officers and non-commissioned members of other CAF branches. The CIC is specifically trained to deliver the Royal Canadian Sea, Army, and Air Cadet training program. Some are former cadets, and many have former regular or reserve force service.

The Canadian Cadet Organization is sponsored in partnership by the CAF/DND and the civilian Air Cadet League, along with the Navy League and Army Cadet League. Each cadet unit is supported by a local squadron sponsoring committee responsible to the national League through each of the provincial committees. The basic Air Cadet program is provided at no cost, including uniforms and activities. Many Air Cadet squadrons are sponsored locally by a service organization or club such as a Royal Canadian Legion Branch, Royal Canadian Air Force Association Wing, Rotary Club, Lions Club, others are supported by a locally established committee often composed of parents of cadets. Civilian sponsors raise money for accommodations, utilities, liability insurance, local awards, and additional training resources or special activities, such as mess dinners, band instruments, or squadron excursions and trips that are not funded by the CAF/DND. Cadets and their parents are encouraged to participate in fund-raising activities, such as selling paper tags or poppies.

== History ==
The Air Cadet Organization originated in the early days of World War II when the war effort required young men to meet Canada's military obligations. By 1938 there existed a couple of groups that would help promote such an effort. In Winnipeg, Manitoba this was the Winnipeg Air Cadets launched by Albert Bennett. Other such groups existed in St. Catharines, ON and in Penhold, AB.

Prior to 1940, official Air Cadet squadrons did not exist. However, in 1939 Alan Duncan Bell-Irving and A.W. (Nick) Carter formed the 1601 Air Force Cadet Wing in Vancouver. This Squadron was operated directly by the Department of National Defence in association with the No. 111 Squadron of the RCAF, which was stationed in Vancouver at the time. A.W. (Nick) Carter became the first commanding officer of the 1601 Wing until he was called to Ottawa to assist in the formation of the new Air Cadet League of Canada. After the formation of the Air Cadet League of Canada the 1601 Wing was chartered to the League and became 111 Vancouver Squadron. The 111 Air Cadet Squadron still exists and parades at Bessborough Armoury in Vancouver under the name 111 Pegasus Squadron.

In 1940, Air Minister Power directed that a nationwide voluntary organization be formed to sponsor and develop a select group of young men who would be trained to meet the increasing need for operational pilots in the RCAF during World War II.

On November 11, 1940, an Order-in-Council was passed to establish the Air Cadet League of Canada to work in partnership with the RCAF. The first squadrons were organized in 1941 and by 1942 there were 135 squadrons and 10,000 cadets, mostly recruited from the Army Cadets. By 1943, there were 315 squadrons with a membership of 23,000. In 1944, the program reached its peak membership with 29,000 cadets in 374 squadrons.

The first uniform the Air Cadets used were hand-me-down uniforms from the Pre-War era RCAF. It consisted of a blue/gray wool uniform; cap (wedge), pants and a full collar tunic. This was phased out in 1943 with an open collar variation similar to the war time RCAF enlisted man's tunic. After the war the air cadet organization received more hand me down uniforms from the RCAF before adopting the battle dress style uniform.

After the war, membership dropped to a low of 11,000 in 155 squadrons and the Air Cadet program underwent a transformation to reflect the changing needs of Canada and the cadets. The Air Cadet League introduced awards for proficiency and loyalty to the squadrons, summer courses were offered at RCAF stations, and a flying scholarship course was developed. To date, more than 15,000 cadets have received their private pilot licence through the scholarship course. Training shifted to be focused on the development of citizenship and an interest in aviation. Interest was renewed; by 1961, 332 squadrons were in existence and in 1972, authority was given for membership of up to 28,000 cadets.

In 1953, Philip, Duke of Edinburgh, was appointed the organization's Air Commodore-in-Chief, a position he held until his death in 2021.

In areas where there was a high interest in air cadets, additional squadrons were established with different parade nights to accommodate the numbers. These squadrons were often placed into air cadet wings (a formation of two or more squadrons) with a separate wing HQ staff of both officers and senior cadets overseeing the operation. The system was discontinued in the late 1960s and all squadrons became independent once again.

From the early days senior air cadets were given opportunities to work in staff positions beside officers, certain contracted civilians and RCAF/CAF members at summer camps across Canada. A system was developed where senior cadets aged 16 or older were temporarily enrolled in the RCAF/CAF on short-term contracts and given the rank of Acting Corporal. They were referred to as Call-out Corporals. The Senior Leaders Course at Cold Lake later even used the CAF rank of Acting Master Corporal among its staff of Call-out Corporals. Later the system was abolished and the "staff cadet" program selected senior cadets for advanced training who were appointed as staff cadets to assist the adult leadership.

With the unification of the Royal Canadian Navy, the Canadian Army and the Royal Canadian Air Force in 1968, the Canadian Forces became the Air Cadet League's military partner in the delivery of air cadet training. In 1975, legislation was changed to officially allow the enrolment of female cadets into the Royal Canadian Sea, Army, and Air Cadets. The "battle dress" style woollen air force blue uniform was changed to a CAF rifle green safari style uniform. The style and weight were more suited to the indoor and summer training reality of the program. The first of these was issued to cadet squadrons commencing in 1978. A new embellished brass cap badge was issued and air cadet wings were worn on the left breast rather than the right. When the CAF went back to separate uniform colours in the mid-1980s, cadets followed again with a new air force blue cadet uniform being issued but following the same style as the outgoing green uniform. Squadrons received these new uniforms commencing in the fall of 1992.

Today, the Royal Canadian Air Cadets has a membership of approximately 23,000 in 456 squadrons; and together with the Royal Canadian Sea Cadets and Royal Canadian Army Cadets, forms the "largest federally funded youth program in the country". The membership has also diversified, becoming gender balanced and attracting and retaining visible minorities.

== Local training ==
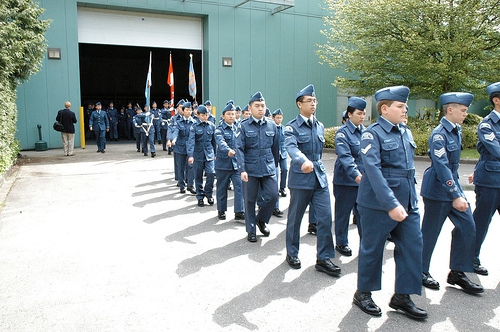
An Air Cadet squadron marching

Each squadron trains one night per week—a "parade night"—to undertake the local training program. The course of instruction is prescribed by the Director of Cadets and outlined in course training plans distributed to each squadron. The six-year program provides cadets instruction in citizenship, leadership, survival training, instructional techniques, drill and ceremonial and the basics of aviation and aeronautics. In the fifth and subsequent years, cadets may be assigned to instruct these classes to the younger cadets. The local training begins in September and continues until June.

In addition to the mandatory weekly training syllabus, there are additional regularly scheduled activities that cadets can participate in optional training that includes band, firearms safety and marksmanship using the 10 metre air rifle for both training and competition, biathlon, military drill practice, first aid training, and competitions, and ground school instruction in preparation for glider pilot and private pilot training courses. Many of these activities also involve regional, provincial, or national competitions between teams and individual cadets. Throughout the year there are weekend exercises organized by the local squadrons. Survival exercises, participation in Remembrance Day ceremonies, and familiarization flights are all activities in which cadets may participate at various points throughout the training year. Some cadet squadrons participate in community events such as parades and band concerts.

=== Cadet Program Update – Squadron program ===
Beginning with the 2008/2009 training year, a new training system was introduced replacing the program that was in use since 1992. The Cadet Program Update (CPU) brings new teaching materials and incorporates more contemporary educational and youth development methods. Similar updates to the Sea and Army Cadet programs rationalize the connectivity between the three programs and more efficiently provides the training that is common to all three elements.

The cornerstone of the CPU is the recognition that people between the ages of 12-18 pass through three basic "Developmental Periods" (DPs). These DPs mark the development of their cognitive abilities from a purely experienced-based (i.e. "hands-on") method of learning to abstract problem-solving and competency. The training methods used at each training level reflect the target age group of the cadets in that training level.

The delivery of the various performance objectives (POs) will be through a mixture of mandatory and complementary enabling objectives (EOs). The mandatory EOs will be the same for all air cadet squadrons. Individual squadrons may choose from a number of complementary EOs to support the mandatory training. The selection of complementary training activities at a local squadron is based on the local resources and the interests of the cadets involved.

The program will be phased in one year at a time with the new proficiency level 5 being introduced for the 2012/2013 training year. Cadets already undergoing training in the current system will complete their training under the outgoing system.

This program is soon to be updated by the Cadet Program Rescope.

=== Squadron training levels ===
Air cadets are challenged to qualify to five training levels. Each level is normally completed in the ten-month training period from September to June. With the approval of the commanding officer, cadets 14 years of age and older may complete levels 1 and 2 in a single training year. Success in meeting the required standard is rewarded with the appropriate level qualification badge. As cadets advance in the program, lessons are designed to prepare them to take on responsibilities within the squadron, such as teaching other cadets. The chart below displays the training level structure of the Royal Canadian Air Cadets. As of the 2022-2023 training year, PHASE (Promoting Healthy And Safe Experiences) training has replaced PSRY (Positive Social Relations with Youth) training. In 2024, level 5 and beyond are replaced with the ALP, Advanced Leadership Program, to improve the leadership training of senior cadets.

Levels of the Royal Canadian Air Cadets – Junior Cadets
Level One	Level Two	Level Three
To achieve Level One a cadet must satisfactorily complete the following first year performance objectives: PO 101 – Citizenship; PO 102 – Community Service; PO 103 – Leadership; PO 104 – Personal Fitness and Healthy Living; PO 105 – Recreational Sports; PO 106 – Air Rifle Marksmanship; PO 107 – General Cadet Knowledge; PO 108 – Drill; PO 120 – Canadian Forces Familiarization; PO 121 – Canadian Aviation, Aerospace and Aerodrome Operations Community Familiarization; PO 129 – Radio Communication; PO 130 – Aviation Activities; PO 140 – Aerospace Activities; PO 160 – Aerodrome Operations Activities; PO 190 – Aircrew Survival; PHASE Training	To achieve Level Two a cadet must satisfactorily complete the following second year performance objectives: PO 201 – Citizenship; PO 202 – Community Service; PO 203 – Leadership; PO 204 – Personal Fitness and Healthy Living; PO 205 – Recreational Sports; PO 206 – Air Rifle Marksmanship; PO 207 – General Cadet Knowledge; PO 208 – Drill; PO 211 – Biathlon; PO 230 – Aviation History; PO 231 – Principles of Flight; PO 232 – Propulsion; PO 240 – Aerospace; PO 260 – Aerodrome Operations; PO 270 – Aircraft Manufacturing and Maintenance; PO 290 – Aircrew Survival; PHASE Training	To achieve Level Three a cadet must satisfactorily complete the following third year performance objectives: PO 301 – Citizenship; PO 302 – Community Service; PO 303 – Leadership; PO 304 – Personal Fitness and Healthy Living; PO 305 – Recreational Sports; PO 306 – Air Rifle Marksmanship; PO 307 – General Cadet Knowledge; PO 308 – Drill; PO 309 – Instructional Techniques; PO 311 – Biathlon; PO 320 – Canadian Forces Familiarization; PO 331 – Principles of Flight; PO 336 – Meteorology; PO 337 – Air Navigation; PO 340 – Aerospace; PO 360 – Aerodrome Operations; PO 370 – Aircraft Manufacturing and Maintenance; PO 390 – Aircrew Survival; PHASE Training

Levels of the Royal Canadian Air Cadets – Senior Cadets
Level Four	Level Five	Onwards
To achieve Level Four a cadet must satisfactorily complete the following fourth year performance objectives: PO 401 – Citizenship; PO 402 – Community Service; PO 403 – Leadership; PO 404 – Personal Fitness and Healthy Living; PO 405 – Recreational Sports; PO 406 – Air Rifle Marksmanship; PO 407 – General Cadet Knowledge; PO 408 – Drill; PO 409 – Instructional Techniques; PO 420 – Canadian Forces Familiarization; PO 429 – Radio Communication; PO 431 – Principles of Flight; PO 432 – Propulsion; PO 436 – Meteorology; PO 437 – Air Navigation; PO 440 – Aerospace; PO 460 – Aerodrome Operations; PO 470 – Aircraft Manufacturing and Maintenance; PO 490 – Aircrew Survival; PHASE Training	To achieve Level Five a cadet must satisfactorily complete the following fifth year performance objectives: PO 501 - Citizenship; PO 502 – Community Service; PO 503 – Leadership; PO 504 – Personal Fitness and Healthy Living; PO 507 – General Cadet Knowledge; PO 509 – Instructional Techniques; PO 513 – Personal Development (Workshops); PO 514 – Personal Development (Individual Learning)	Cadets who have completed Level Five are often assigned responsibilities to help administer the squadron including assisting in clothing stores, squadron administration, training coordination and instruction; There are no further badges awarded beyond Level Five

=== Complementary training groups ===
Squadrons, depending on a number of factors, may have some of the following teams/groups to complement mandatory training. This is not an exhaustive list.

- Drill team: The vast majority of squadrons have some sort of drill team. On drill team, cadets will refine their drill learned during mandatory parade nights and learn more complex drill manoeuvres. Cadets on drill team may have the opportunity to join a drill team with arms, join a flag party, and compete in regional competitions. Cadets interested in drill may elect to take the or Introduction to Drill and Ceremonial or Drill and Ceremonial Instructor summer training course.
- Marksmanship team: Some squadrons may have a marksmanship team. Cadets on marksmanship team learn to fire lead pellets at paper targets using the Daisy Air Rifle, which is not legally classified as a firearm. Cadets may compete in regional or national marksmanship competitions. Cadets interested in marksmanship may elect to take the Air Rifle Marksmanship Instructor summer training course.
- Military band: Some squadrons may elect to offer musical training. Cadets in military band have the opportunity to learn a brass, woodwind, or percussion instrument. Cadets will learn their instrument as well as various specialized drill manoeuvres. Military bands in cadets are led by adult staff and a cadet Drum Major. Cadets may have the opportunity to compete in musical competitions at various levels. Cadets interested in music may elect to take the Military Band Musician and Introduction to Military Band summer training courses.
- Pipe band: Some squadrons may offer pipes and drums training. Cadets in a pipe band have the opportunity to learn the bagpipes, snare drum, tenor drum, or bass drum. Cadets will learn their instrument as well as various specialized drill manoeuvres. Pipe bands in the cadets are led by adult staff, a cadet Pipe Major, and a cadet Drum Major. Pipe Band Musician was not offered as summer training course in 2022.
- Biathlon team: Some squadrons may have a biathlon team. Cadets will learn how to run or ski cross-country and learn how to shoot a target. Cadets may have the opportunity to compete in regional or national competitions.
- Ground school: Some squadrons may have a ground school group, where cadets learn the fundamentals of aviation (per Transport Canada guidelines). Less squadrons have offered this in recent years due to the introduction of the national online ground school, which is the only recognized ground school program for applications for the cadet PPTC and GPTC.

== Summer training ==
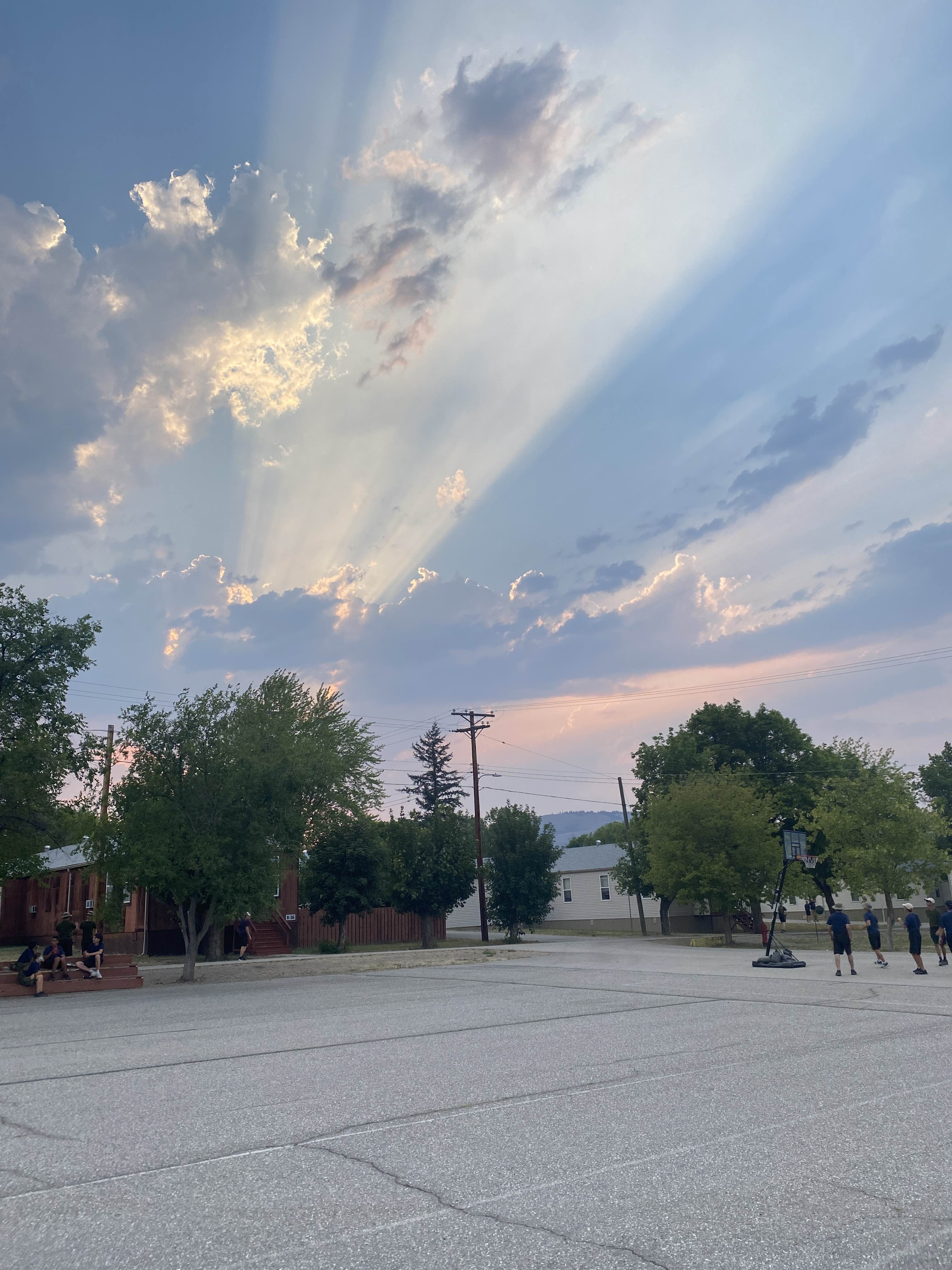
Sunset at Vernon Cadet Training Centre

Air cadets have the opportunity to participate in training outside of their squadron during the summer. Cadets can participate in summer training courses at a Cadet Training Centre (CTC) or national summer training courses.

=== Cadet Training Centre ===
A Cadet Training Centre (CTC) is a facility where cadets from the Royal Canadian Sea, Army, and Air Cadets participate in in-person summer training courses. Cadets become eligible to attend a CTC after completing their second year of local training. These centres offer courses designed to develop leadership, instructional ability, and self-confidence. Most courses are either two-week introductory programs or four-week instructional courses that prepare cadets for future leadership roles within the program.

==== In-Person Summer Courses ====
In-person CTC courses are generally divided into two categories: introduction courses and instructor courses. Introduction courses, which are typically two weeks in length, focus on developing a cadet’s personal skills and foundational knowledge in a specific subject area. These courses aim to enable cadets to return to their home units with greater confidence and contribute to related activities. Instructor courses are four weeks long and emphasize leadership, instructional techniques, and subject-specific expertise. Cadets who complete instructor courses are expected to take on teaching and leadership roles within their units. Upon successful completion of any in-person CTC course, cadets receive a qualification badge to wear on their dress uniform.

Course	Length	Prerequisites	Element	Location
Introduction to Marksmanship (ITM)	2 Weeks	Proficiency level 2+	Common	Argonaut CTC, Blackdown CTC, Valcartier CTC, Vernon CTC
Air Rifle Marksmanship Instructor (ARMI)	4 Weeks	Proficiency level 3+	Common	Argonaut CTC, Blackdown CTC, Valcartier CTC, Vernon CTC, Whitehorse CTC
Introduction to Drill and Ceremonial (ITDC)	2 Weeks	Proficiency level 2+	Common	Argonaut CTC, Blackdown, Rocky Mountain CTC, CTC, Valcartier CTC, Vernon CTC
Drill and Ceremonial Instructor Course (DCI)	4 Weeks	Proficiency level 3+	Common	Argonaut CTC, Blackdown, Rocky Mountain CTC, CTC, Valcartier CTC, Vernon CTC, Whitehorse CTC
Introduction to Fitness and Sports (ITFS)	2 Weeks	Proficiency level 2+	Common	Blackdown CTC, Greenwood CTC, Valcartier CTC, Vernon CTC
Fitness and Sports Instructor Course (FSI)	4 Weeks	Proficiency level 3+	Common	Blackdown CTC, Greenwood CTC, Valcartier CTC, Vernon CTC
Introduction to Military Band (ITMB)	2 Weeks	Proficiency level 2+	Common	Blackdown CTC, HMCS Quadra CTC, Valcartier CTC
Military Band Musician (MB)	4 Weeks	Proficiency level 3+ / Musician Level II	Common	Blackdown CTC, HMCS Quadra CTC, Valcartier CTC
Introduction to Pipe Band (ITPB)	2 Weeks	Proficiency level 2+	Common	Blackdown CTC, Rocky Mountain CTC
Pipe Band Musician (PB)	4 Weeks	Proficiency level 3+ / Pipes and Drums Level II	Common	Blackdown CTC, Rocky Mountain CTC
Aviation Technology and Aerospace (ATA)	2 Weeks	Proficiency level 2+	Air	Bagotville CTC, Blackdown CTC, Cold Lake CTC, Greenwood CTC, HMCS Quadra CTC
Advanced Aviation Course (AA)	4 Weeks	Proficiency level 3+	Air	Bagotville CTC, Blackdown CTC, Cold Lake CTC, Greenwood CTC, HMCS Quadra CTC
Glider Pilot Training Course (GPTC)	6 - 7 Weeks	Proficiency level 3+ / 16 Years of age by Sept 1 / Vaild TCCA Cat 3 Medical	Air	St-Jean CTC, Gimli CFTC
Power Pilot Training Course (PPTC)	7 Weeks	Proficiency level 4+ / 17 Years of age by Sept 1 / Vaild TCCA Cat 3 Medical	Air	Argonaut CTC, Bagotville CTC, HMCS Quadra CTC, St-Jean CTC
Introduction to Survival (ITS)	2 Weeks	Proficiency level 2+	Air	Argonaut CTC, Blackdown CTC, Cold Lake CTC, Valcartier CTC, Vernon CTC
Survival Instructor Course (SI)	4 Weeks	Proficiency level 3+	Air	Argonaut CTC, Blackdown CTC, Cold Lake CTC, Valcartier CTC, Whitehorse CTC

==== Cadet Training Centres ====
Cadet Training Centres (CTCs) are specialized facilities operated during the summer months to provide advanced, in-person training for cadets across Canada. These centres are managed by the Canadian Armed Forces in partnership with the Cadet Program and serve as extensions of the training offered at local units. CTCs deliver structured courses that focus on leadership, instructional techniques, technical skills, and personal development. They also provide cadets with the opportunity to meet peers from across the country, experience a disciplined and team-oriented environment, and apply what they have learned throughout the training year in a practical setting.

Current Cadet Training Centres (2025)
CTC	Location	Region	Primary Element	First Year	Language	Notes
Argonaut CTC	5 CDSB Gagetown	Atlantic	Army	1972	English	
Bagotville CTC	CFB Bagotville	Eastern	Sea	1969	French	
Blackdown CTC	CFB Borden	Central	Army	1994	Bilingual	
Cold Lake CTC	CFB Cold Lake	Northwest	Air	1973	English	
Greenwood CTC	CFB Greenwood	Atlantic	Air		English	
HMCS Ontario CTC	CFB Kingston	Central	Sea	1981	English	
HMCS Quadra CTC	CFB Comox	Pacific	Sea	1952	English	
Rocky Mountain CTC	Cochrane, Alberta	Northwest	Army	1999	English	
St-Jean CTC	RMC Saint-Jean	Eastern	Air	1975	French	
Trenton CTC	CFB Trenton	Central	Army	1929	English	
Valcartier CTC	2 CDSB Valcartier	Eastern	Army	1968	French	
Vernon CTC	Vernon, British Columbia	Pacific	Army	1949	English	
Whitehorse CTC	Whitehorse, Yukon	Northwest	Army	1985	English	

Former Cadet Training Centres
CTC	Location	Region	Year closed	Reason for closing
Albert Head Air Cadet Summer Training Centre	CFB Esquimalt	Pacific	2022	Cadet Program Rescope, returned to Maritime Forces Pacific
Comox Cadet Flying Training Centre	CFB Comox	Pacific	2022	Cadet Program Rescope, merged with HMCS Quadra CTC
Penhold Air Cadet Summer Training Centre	RCAF Station Penhold	Northwest	2014	High leasing and infrastructure costs
Gimli Cadet Flying Training Centre	Gimli, Manitoba	Northwest	2022	Cadet Program Rescope
Mountainview Cadet Flying Training Centre	CFB Trenton	Central	2022	Cadet Program Rescope, merged with Trenton CTC
Debert Cadet Flying Training Centre	CFS Debert	Atlantic	2022	Cadet Program Rescope

=== Technology and Digital Learning Centre ===
The Cadet Technology and Digital Learning Centre (TDLC) is a virtual training program offered by Cadets Canada during the summer. It provides cadets with the opportunity to participate in interactive, instructor-led and self-paced courses from home using Cadet365 and Microsoft Teams. Aimed at cadets in their second year or higher, TDLC focuses on digital skills and leadership development through courses like cyber safety, drone operation, coding, and more. The program runs on weekdays for a few hours each day, making it a flexible alternative to in-person Cadet Training Centres. Participants can also earn certifications and develop valuable technical skills in a supportive online environment.

Course	Requirements	Duration	Notes
Cyber Safety and Security Team Leader (CSSTL)	Proficiency level 2+ / Laptop / Computer able to operate VMware player	2 Weeks	
Support Services Team Leader (SSTL)	Proficiency level 2+	2 Weeks	Recommended for Proficiency Level 3+
Small Craft Coxswain (SCC)	Proficiency level 2+	2 Weeks	Recommended for Proficiency Level 3+
Basic Microdrone Operator (BMDO)	Proficiency level 2+	2 Weeks	
Nova Quest (NQ)	Proficiency level 2+	2 Weeks	
Basic Coder (BC)	Proficiency level 2+	2 Weeks	

=== Advanced Summer Training ===
Advanced Summer Training is specialized training offered to cadets who have already completed foundational summer training. These programs are typically more intensive and selective, focusing on developing advanced leadership, instructional, or technical skills. Advanced training includes instructor-level courses, exchanges, staff cadet positions, and national-level opportunities such as the International Air Cadet Exchange. Participation in these programs often requires an application, interview, and recommendation from a cadet’s home unit. Successful completion of advanced training prepares cadets for greater responsibilities within their corps or squadron and may support future career or educational goals.

==== Staff Cadets ====
Staff Cadets (SCdt) are experienced cadets who take on leadership and instructional roles during summer training at Cadet Training Centres (CTCs). Typically aged 16 or older, they are selected based on their skills, leadership potential, and past performance in the cadet program. Staff Cadets help supervise, train, and mentor junior cadets, acting as role models while gaining valuable experience in leadership, communication, and team management. They may serve in various positions, such as instructors, section commanders, duty staff, or support roles like logistics or administration. In return for their work, Staff Cadets receive a weekly training allocation (pay) and often gain qualifications that support their advancement both within and outside the cadet program.

Staff Cadet Requirements

- Be 16 years old before the 1st day of employment and not be 19 before the last day of employment.
- Have completed Phase 3/Silver Star/Level 3 by end of training year 2024-2025.
- Be a minimum rank of Petty Officer 2nd Class/Sergeant.
- Have a social insurance number and a personal bank account.

===== Cadet Training Centre Staff =====
Staff Cadets serve in a variety of roles at Cadet Training Centres during the summer, including training, support, and command positions. They are responsible for supervising course cadets, delivering lessons, leading activities, and assisting in the overall operation of the centre. Each CTC has a Warrant Officer 1st Class who acts as the Squadron Chief Warrant Officer of the camp. Individual courses are typically led by a Warrant Officer 2nd Class, with each flight supported by a Flight Sergeant and three Sergeants serving as instructors.

====== Training ======
Staff Cadets assigned to training roles serve as course instructors. They are placed within a Flight (or Platoon for Army, Division for Sea) where they spend each day instructing, leading, and engaging course cadets in additional activities. Training staff typically hold the ranks of Sergeant or Flight Sergeant.

====== Support ======
Each Cadet Training Centre (CTC) employs Staff Cadets in various support roles to ensure smooth operations. These positions include areas such as Operations, Administration, Supply, Correspondence, Canteen management, Sports and Recreation, among others.

====== Senior Cadet Leaders ======
Senior Cadet Staff hold leadership positions within Cadet Training Centres (CTCs) and oversee both individual courses and overall camp operations. Each course is typically commanded by a Warrant Officer 2nd Class, while the most senior cadet at the CTC holds the rank of Warrant Officer 1st Class and serves as the senior cadet leader of the entire centre.

===== Digital Internship =====
A Digital Internship at a Cadet Training Centre (CTC) is a senior cadet staff role where you’re physically on-site yet focused on supporting technology-driven operations. It blends traditional staff cadet responsibilities with specialized digital duties.

- Assistant IT Coordinators
  - Assistant IT Coordinators work on location at a Cadet Training Centre they are responsible for setting up and troubleshooting AV systems, computers, and network gear across the centre.
- IT Service Management Centre Applications Support team / Digital accelerator team
  - Helps analyze, design, and develop small-scale digital applications or tools and works hands-on with low-code platforms, assisting in the implementation of solutions that improve digital workflows.

===== Technology & Digital Learning Centre eLearning Staff =====
An eLearning Staff Cadet is a senior cadet who supports virtual summer training courses from home. They work through Cadet365 (Microsoft Teams and Office apps) to help deliver engaging and effective online instruction to junior cadets across Canada.

===== National Cadet Advisory Council =====
The National Cadet Advisory Council (NCAC), commonly referred to as the National Council, is an advisory body composed of senior cadets from across Canada. It provides feedback and recommendations to the Cadet Organizations Administration and Training Service and the Department of National Defence on cadet program policies, training, and activities. The council serves as a platform for cadets to voice their opinions, share ideas, and contribute to the development and improvement of the cadet experience at a national level. Members are selected based on leadership ability, experience, and their commitment to representing the interests of the broader cadet community.

===== Staff Cadet Pay =====
Staff Cadet pay is based on the salary scale for Canadian Armed Forces Reserve Officer Cadets' base pay. Cadets serving as staff are compensated according to their rank, with higher ranks receiving higher pay rates.

Rank	Percentage	Daily Pay (as of 2026)
Cadet Flight Corporal	72%	$108.00
Cadet Sergeant	78%	$117.00
Cadet Flight Sergeant	84%	$126.00
Cadet Warrant Officer 2nd	90%	$135.00
Cadet Warrant Officer 1st Class	96%	$144.00

== Flying ==
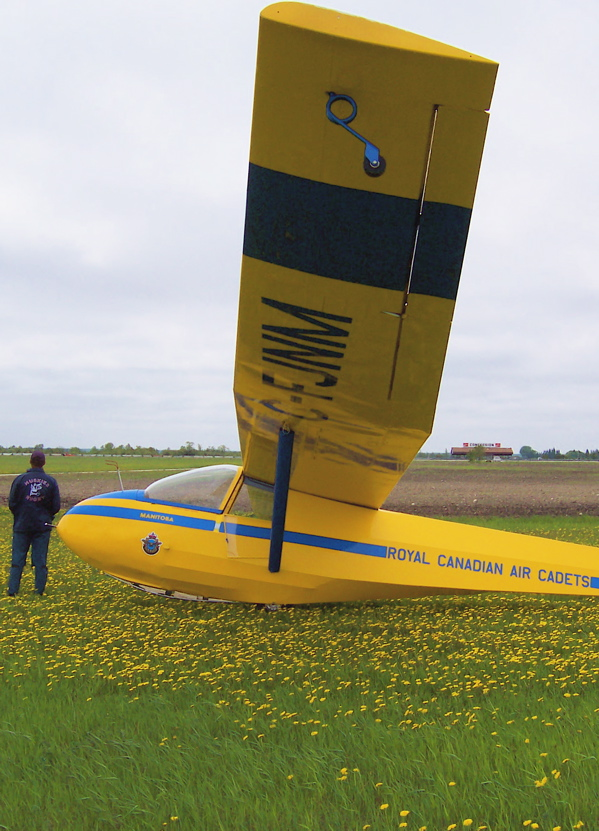
The Schweizer SGS 2-33 (2-33A), used for training in the Air Cadet Gliding Program

Throughout the spring and fall approximately 22,000 air cadets participate in familiarization gliding at regional gliding centres located across the country. Each summer, 320 cadets earn a Transport Canada Glider Pilot Licence through the Air Cadet Glider Pilot Training Course and 250 more earn a Private Pilot licence. The Air Cadet Gliding Program conducts approximately 60,000 glider flights annually in Schweizer SGS 2-33 gliders. The aircraft fleet used in the gliding program is owned by the Air Cadet League of Canada. The fleet, consisting of more than 100 gliders and tow planes is maintained by the Canadian Armed Forces under a memorandum of understanding. Canadian Armed Forces pilots and Civilian Instructors operate the fleet to train cadets. The aircraft that are used during the Private Pilot Training Course are various, and they depend on the flight school the cadet is posted at during their course. The Private Pilot Training Course is operated by private flight schools, and the instructors are not affiliated with the cadet program. The aircraft can be a Cessna 152, Cessna 150, Cessna 172, or DA20 Katana.

=== Aircraft ===
Make/Model	Type	Manufacturer	Origins
Schweizer SGS 2-33A	Glider	Schweizer Aircraft	United States
Cessna L-19 Superdog	Tow Plane	Cessna	United States
Cessna 182	Tow Plane	Cessna	United States
Bellanca Scout	Tow Plane	Bellanca	United States

== Uniforms ==
Members of the Royal Canadian Air Cadets are issued uniforms. Uniforms are based on Royal Canadian Air Force dress and include a wedge cap, light blue shirt, tie, tunic, trousers, and parade boots. Cadets wear rank badges, name tags, and qualification insignia, and are expected to maintain a high standard of appearance.

Category	Order of Dress	When Worn
Ceremonial Dress	C1 - Ceremonial Dress	A formal order of dress, worn on occasion including: 1. formal ceremonies or parades; 2. guards of honour; and 3. church services or parades.
Ceremonial Dress	C1H - Highland Dress	A formal or routine order of dress for Highland and kilted Irish units and pipe bands.
Ceremonial Dress	C1H - Highland Dress Short Sleeve	At the discretion of corps / squadron CO
Mess Dress	C2 - Mess Dress	Optional formal order of dress worn on the following occasions: 1. mess or formal dinners; and 2. other occasions as ordered.
Mess Dress	C2H - Highland Mess Dress	At the discretion of corps / squadron CO
Service Dress	C3 - Service Dress	Routine daily duty
Service Dress	C3A - Open Collar	At the discretion of corps / squadron CO
Service Dress	C3B - Summer Dress	At the discretion of corps / squadron CO
Service Dress	C3C - Travel Dress	At the discretion of corps / squadron CO
Service Dress	C3H - Highland Service Dress	At the discretion of corps / squadron CO
Training Dress	C5 - Field Training Uniform (FTU)	A functional order of dress worn when participating in specific environmental training such as nautical training, marksmanship, garrison / field training or flying.
Training Dress	C5A - FTU Dressed Down	A functional order of dress worn when participating in specific environmental training such as nautical training, marksmanship, garrison / field training or flying.
Training Dress	C5B - Flight Suit	A functional order of dress worn when participating in specific environmental training such as CAF deployments or flying.
Training Dress	C5C - PT Gear	At the discretion of CTC or corps / squadron CO.

=== Accoutrements ===
Air Cadets have additional items they can wear on their uniform based on their positions as a command role or membership in a band or flag party.

==== Pace Sticks / Drill Canes ====
Pace Sticks are ceremonial tools used by senior cadets to symbolize leadership and drill authority. The pace stick is used to measure marching pace and spacing. It represents discipline and precision, and is usually reserved for advanced leadership or ceremonial appointments. Only the Squadron Warrant Officer and Squadron Chief Warrant Officer are allowed to carry a pace stick on parade.

Drill Canes are symbolic tools carried by senior cadets, usually in leadership roles such as. Unlike pace sticks, drill canes are not used for measuring but serve as a mark of authority, discipline, and ceremonial presence. They are only used by the Royal Canadian Army Cadets, except when at a Cadet Training Centre where senior Sea Cadets and Air Cadets can carry a drill cane.

==== Lanyards, Gaiters, and Cotton Gloves ====
Lanyards, Gaiters, and Cotton Gloves are ceremonial accessories used by Air Cadets during formal parades and special events. Lanyards are typically worn by staff cadets or those on specific courses, signifying appointment or role. Gaiters, though less common in Air Cadets, may be worn during ceremonial drill to maintain uniformity. Cotton gloves are often worn by flag parties and drill teams to enhance appearance and precision during parade movements.

==== White Webbing ====
White Webbing is a ceremonial uniform accessory worn by Air Cadets during formal parades and duties such as flag party or leadership roles. It typically includes a white belt and cross straps, and is used to enhance appearance and reflect discipline and precision, especially during summer training or drill-focused activities.

Brassards

Brassards are cloth armbands worn on the upper sleeve of the Air Cadet uniform to display qualification badges, rank, and awards. They help keep the main tunic clean and allow for easy updating of badges. They are worn mainly at Cadet Training Centres to indicate rank.

Remembrance Day Symbols

The Remembrance Day poppy is authorized to be worn on all uniforms from the last Friday of October until Remembrance Day (November 11th). The poppy is to be worn on the top centre of the rank tab of the field training uniform and on the left pocket flap of the shirt and left chest of the jacket and all-season coat.

=== Insignia Badges ===
Insignia Badges worn by Air Cadets show rank, qualifications, and achievements. They are usually placed on the uniform and recognize a cadet's skills and progress within the program.

==== Proficiency Insignia ====
Insignia Badges worn by Air Cadets indicate rank, qualifications, and achievements. These badges recognize a cadet's skills and progress within the Royal Canadian Air Cadets program and are displayed on the uniform in designated positions. The fitness badge has been on hold from being awarded due to the evaluation of the badge. The Fitness badge can still be used on C3s to any cadets awarded the badge before the hold.

Proficiency Insignia
Type	Level	Badge
Fitness	Bronze	Badge indicating I
Fitness	Silver	Badge indicating II
Fitness	Gold	Badge indicating III
Fitness	Excellence	Badge with a Maple Leaf
Music	Basic	Music note
Music	Level I	Music note with I
Music	Level II	Music note with II
Music	Level III	Music note with III
Music	Level IV	Music note with IV
Music	Level V	Music note with V
Marksmanship	Marksman	Crossed Rifles with I
Marksmanship	Marksman First Class	Crossed Rifles with II
Marksmanship	Expert Marksman	Crossed Rifles with III
Marksmanship	Distinguished Marksman	Crossed Rifles with IV
First Aid	Emergency First Aid	First Aid Cross with I
First Aid	Standard First Aid	First Aid Cross with II

==== Participation and Competition Insignia ====
Participation and Competition Insignia recognize Air Cadets’ involvement and achievements in sports, marksmanship, music, and other activities. They highlight cadets’ extra efforts and are worn on the uniform.

Type	Level	Badge / Pin
Staff and Exchange	Staff Cadet	Maple Leaf with Wreath
Staff and Exchange	International Exchange	Globe
ACLC Effective Speaking Competition	Zone Bronze	Bronze Air Cadet Speaking Pin
ACLC Effective Speaking Competition	Provincial Silver	Silver Air Cadet Speaking Pin
ACLC Effective Speaking Competition	National Gold	Gold Air Cadet Speaking Pin
Marksmanship Competition	Marksmanship Zone Competition Bronze	Bronze Cadet Prone Shooter
Marksmanship Competition	Marksmanship Provincial Competition Silver	Silver Cadet Prone Shooter
Marksmanship Competition	Marksmanship National Competition Gold	Gold Cadet Prone Shooter
Marksmanship Competition	Vanplew and Clément Tremblay Awards	Gold Cadet Prone Shooter in a Wreath
Biathlon Competition	Biathlon Zone Competition Bronze	Bronze Cadet Skiing
Biathlon Competition	Biathlon Provincial Competition Silver	Silver Cadet Skiing
Biathlon Competition	Biathlon National Competition Gold	Gold Cadet Skiing
Biathlon Competition	Myriam Bédard, Nikki Keddie and Jean-Philippe Le Guellec Awards	Gold Cadet Skiing in a Wreath

== Ranks ==
Upon enrolment, a new cadet in the Air Cadet Program is known as a "cadet" (Cdt). Promotion to higher ranks occurs after the cadet has met certain nationally prescribed standards. The specific criteria for all ranks are established to ensure that all cadets who receive a rank promotion possess the same basic qualifications or similar experience. The successful completion of squadron training serves as the common standard on which all cadets are evaluated, and that every cadet is given the same opportunity to advance.

Cadets typically start receiving responsibilities within their squadrons upon reaching the rank of flight corporal. Flight corporals may act as section commanders within their flights, giving guidance to sections of junior cadets on topics such as uniforms and drill. Sergeants are responsible for the day-to-day activities of the squadron, with their responsibilities including instructing EOs, performing various administrative tasks (i.e.: attendance), and assisting flight NCOs as seconds-in-command. Flight sergeants command flights and have responsibilities similar to those of sergeants. Warrant officers 2nd class work closely with adult leadership to ensure smooth operations and the completion of all necessary tasks. They usually assist officers in support roles in administration, training, supply, and public relations. Warrant officers 1st class report directly to the commanding officer of their squadron and oversee all squadron activities.

The official name of each rank uses the word cadet as a preface (e.g.: cadet corporal). However, custom omits cadet in casual reference, thus, corporal is the usual wording. Where there is a need to distinguish between cadets and Canadian Forces members, ranks will be written or spoken as cadet corporal and abbreviated as C/Cpl.

=== Merit review board process ===
All promotions to the rank of flight sergeant (FSgt), warrant officer second class (WO2) and warrant officer first class (WO1) require the cadet to be recommended by a merit review board (MRB). The MRB is composed of a minimum of three to a maximum of five members. As appointed by the squadron commanding officer, members include the commanding officer (or delegate) acting as the board's chairperson, a representative of the Air Cadet League or local sponsor, and 1-3 additional members.

The MRB has two parts: a review of the cadet's file and an interview. Criteria for the file review are the same for all candidates and are set by the board chairperson, but generally includes rates of attendance, a review of the cadet's performance in squadron training, a review of summer training course reports or performance evaluations, relevant positive or disciplinary notes on file, and a list of awards the cadet has received at the squadron and national level. Once the file review is completed, cadets will be invited to complete the interview. All participating cadets will be asked the same questions, which are sent to them up to 72 hours in advance of the interview. Cadets may be asked questions about their participation and goals in the program, their leadership experiences, and how they would respond to various scenarios. Once both portions of the MRB process have been completed, the board will decide whether the cadet merits promotion to the next rank.

Ranks of the Royal Canadian Air Cadets
Junior cadets (air cadet - flight corporal)
CDT 1	CDT 2	CDT 3	CDT 4
Air Cadet (Cdt) cadet de l'air	Leading Air Cadet (LAC) cadet de l'air de 1^{er} Classe	Cadet Corporal (Cpl) caporal	Cadet Flight Corporal (FCpl) caporal de section
No insignia	One double-bladed propeller.	a two-bar chevron	A two-bar chevron surmounted by St Edward's Crown
The rank of air cadet is granted upon enrollment. Those wishing to enroll must be at least 12 years of age and younger than 19 years of age.	In order to be promoted to leading air cadet, a cadet must: Actively participate in the proficiency Level 1 of the LHQ training program for a minimum period of five months; and; Be recommended by the appropriate flight commander (officer).	In order to be promoted to corporal, a cadet must: Hold the rank of leading air cadet; Successfully complete the first year of the proficiency level training (Proficiency Level 1); and; Be recommended by the appropriate flight commander (officer).	In order to be promoted to flight corporal, a cadet must: Complete at least six months service at the rank of corporal; Successfully complete the second year of the proficiency level training program (Proficiency Level 2); and; Be recommended by the appropriate flight commander (officer).
Senior cadets (sergeant - warrant officer first class)
CDT 5	CDT 6	CDT 7	CDT 8
Cadet Sergeant (Sgt) sergent	Cadet Flight Sergeant (FSgt) sergent de section	Cadet Warrant Officer Second Class (WO2 or WOII) adjudant 2^{e} classe	Cadet Warrant Officer First Class (WO1 or WOI) adjudant 1^{er} classe
A three-bar chevron	A three-bar chevron surmounted by St Edward's Crown	St Edward's Crown within a wreath of maple leaves	A simplified version of the coat of arms of Canada
In order to be promoted to sergeant, a cadet must: Complete at least six months service at the rank of flight corporal; Successfully complete the third year of the proficiency level training program (Proficiency Level 3); Complete PO303 (Leadership); and; Be recommended by the appropriate flight commander (officer)	In order to be promoted to flight sergeant, a cadet must: Complete at least six months service at the rank of sergeant; Successfully complete the fourth year of the proficiency level training program (Proficiency Level 4); Complete PO403 (Leadership); and; Be recommended by the appropriate flight commander (officer)	In order to be promoted to warrant officer second class, a cadet must: Complete at least six months service at the substantive rank of flight sergeant; Attain a minimum of "completed without difficulty" in PO503 (Leadership); Be identified as a successful candidate through the merit review board process; and; Be recommended by the appropriate flight commander (officer)	In order to be promoted to warrant officer first class, a cadet must: Complete at least six months service at the substantive rank of warrant officer 2nd class; Be identified as a successful candidate through the merit review board process; Hold a leadership position within the squadron; Be recommended by the appropriate flight commander (officer); Upon being promoted, a Warrant Officer 1st Class is appointed as the Squadron Chief Warrant Officer of their respective Squadron, should they not already hold that position. Promotion to warrant officer 1st class may be considered the pinnacle of an Air Cadet's service. Prior to 1976, the size of the squadron dictated the top rank available, and many squadrons were ineligible to carry a WO1 on their establishment effectively capping promotion at WO2 for the squadron's ranking cadet. Squadrons are limited to one warrant officer first class. The warrant officer first class position must be vacant for a cadet to be promoted. An existing warrant officer first class (or equivalent) may keep their rank if they transfer to another corps or squadron.

== Cadet Appointments ==
As Cadets rise though the ranks, once they reach the rank of Sergeant, they are required to take a leadership appointment. The squadron's officers create list of the eligibility of cadets to be promoted. Once a role is open, they review this list, formally inform the Cadet of the appointment and give them any direction or training they need to be successful. More senior cadets in the unit will give advice on the appointment. This appointments can range from Training Support to Command Positions.

Support
Department	Rank	Title	Abbrev.
Administration	Sgt	Administration Sergeant	Admin Sgt
Administration	FSgt	Administration Flight Sergeant	Admin FSgt
Administration	WO2	Administration Warrant Officer Second Class	Admin WO2
Supply	Sgt	Supply Sergeant	Sup Sgt
Supply	Sgt	Cadet Canteen Assistant	Cdt Canteen A
Supply	FSgt	Supply Flight Sergeant	Sup FSgt
Supply	WO2	Supply Warrant Officer Second Class	Sup WO2
Public Affairs	Sgt	Cadet Correspondent Assistant	C Corr A
Public Affairs	FSgt	Cadet Correspondent	C Corr

Training
Department	Rank	Title	Abbrev.
Band	Sgt	Band Sergeant	Band Sgt
Band	FSgt	Music Instructor	Mus Instr
Band	WO2	Band Warrant Officer Second Class	Band WO2
Standards	Sgt	Drill and Ceremonial Assistant	D&C A
Standards	FSgt	Standards Flight Sergeant	Stds FSgt
Standards	WO2	Standards Warrant Officer Second Class	Stds WO2
Instruction	Sgt	Instructor	Instr
Instruction	Sgt	Cadet Marksmanship Coach	Cdt Marks C
Instruction	Sgt	Cadet Biathlon Coach	Cdt Biathlon C
Instruction	FSgt	Survival Instructor	SI
Instruction	FSgt	Fitness and Sports Instructor	FSI
Instruction	FSgt	Drill and Ceremonial Instructor	DCI
Training	Sgt	Cadet Training Assistant	Cdt Trg A
Training	WO2	Training Warrant Officer Second Class	Trg WO2

Organizational
Rank	Title	Abbrev.
Sgt	Section Commander	Sect Comm
Sgt	Flight Second in Command	Flt 2iC
Sgt	Flag Party Second in Command	FP 2iC
FSgt	Flight Sergeant	Flt Sgt
WO2	Squadron Warrant Officer	SWO
WO1	Squadron Chief Warrant Officer	Sqn CWO

=== Music appointments ===
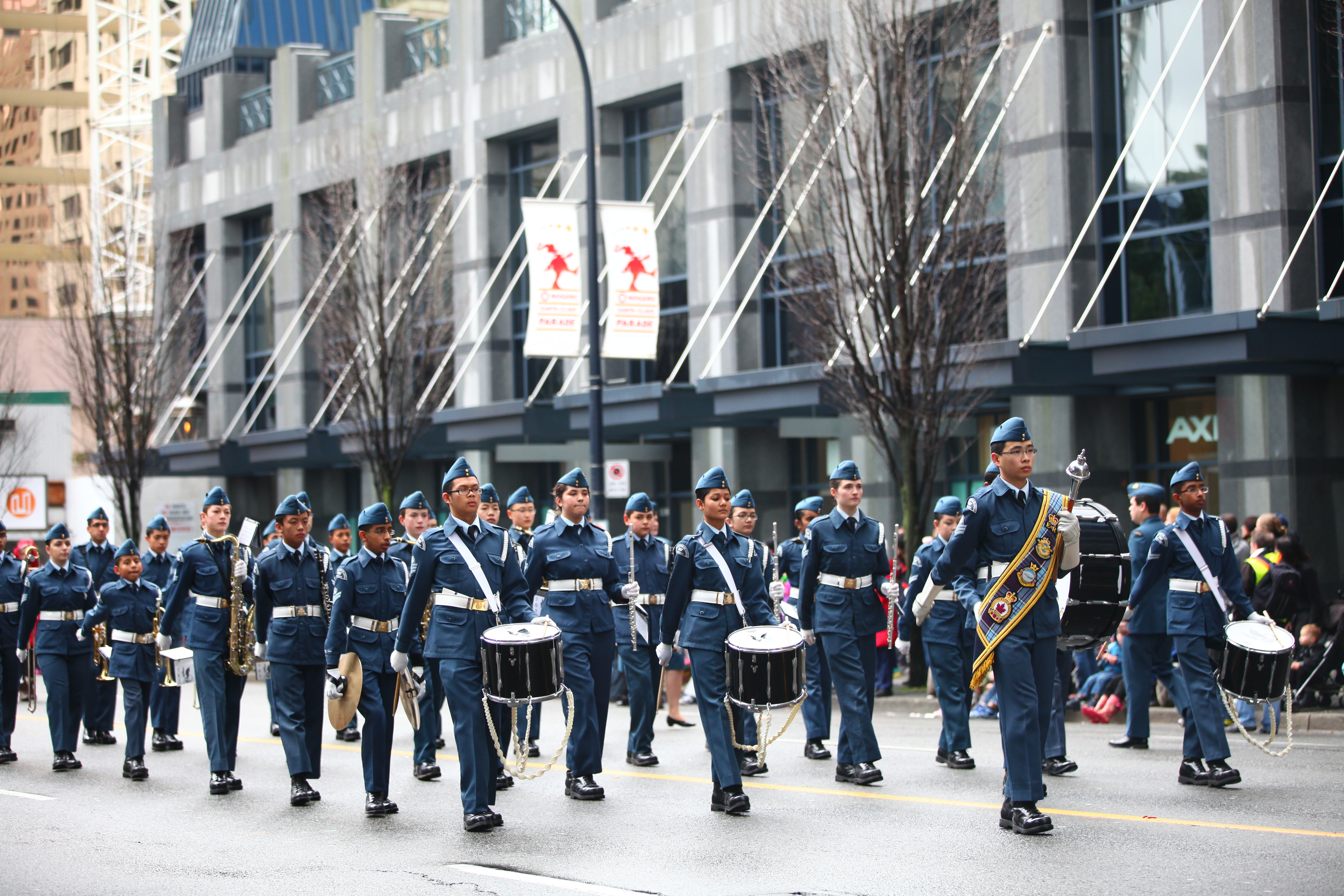
767 Dearman Royal Canadian Air Cadet Squadron band during a Santa Claus Parade in 2012

When a squadron wishes to create a cadet band, the decision to do so must be made in consultation with the sponsoring committee responsible for the provision and maintenance of musical instruments. The cadet music program recognizes two types of bands: military bands and pipe bands. Military bands' instrumentation includes woodwinds, brass, and/or percussion, while pipe bands' instrumentation includes pipes and drums. The Regional Support Cadet Unit should provide instruments on loan to their squadrons to maximize the use of the instruments held by the region and CTCs and to better support squadron training. The music proficiency levels are recognized on the cadet uniform using a system of badges based on the music training programs; the military band badge represents a lyre, while the pipe band badge represents either a pipe or a drum, depending on the instrument played.

The appointment of a Drum Major or Pipe Major is at the discretion of the corps/squadron CO. Requirements considered include: demonstration of skills and knowledge in band drill, commands and formations, qualification of Music Proficiency Level 2, and holds the minimum rank of Flight Corporal. Only one cadet may be appointed as the squadron Drum Major or Pipe Major at any time.

Music Appointments
Drum Major	Pipe Major
Appointed at the discretion of the Squadron Commanding Officer; Demonstrates skills and knowledge in band drill, commands and formations; Qualified Music Proficiency Level 1; Holds the minimum rank of Flight Corporal; Badge is removed when cadet no longer fills the appointment; Worn on lower sleeve. (Between elbow and wrist). Can also be worn higher if the appointed cadet holds the rank of WO2 or higher.; Only one cadet in a squadron can be appointed Drum Major	Appointed at the discretion of the Squadron Commanding Officer; Demonstrates skills and knowledge in band drill, commands and formations; Qualified Music Proficiency Level 1; Holds the minimum rank of Flight Corporal; Badge is removed when cadet no longer fills the appointment; Worn on lower sleeve (between elbow and wrist). Can also be worn higher if the appointed cadet holds the rank of WO2 or higher.; Only one cadet in a squadron can be appointed Pipe Major

== Honours and awards ==
The Canadian Cadet Movement maintains its own Honours and Awards system. Cadets may be awarded these based on criteria including bravery, citizenship, service, outstanding performance on a summer training course, and more. In addition, cadets may also wear, on their uniform, any orders, decorations, and medals of Canada they have been awarded.

Within the system, there are several honours and awards common to all three cadet elements and some that are unique to each. A cadet who transfers from one element to another may continue to wear any medals awarded from their previous service, but in general, air cadets may be eligible for the following nine honours and awards (shown in the order of precedence):

Medal	Image	Description
Cadet Medal for Bravery		Awarded for acts of bravery in hazardous circumstances. It is also given in recognition of outstanding deed of valour, involving risk of his or her life, in attempting to save the life or property of another person.
Lord Strathcona Medal	Lord Strathcona Medal	Awarded for recognition of exemplary performance in physical and military training.
Royal Canadian Legion Cadet Medal of Excellence		Recognizes individual endeavours of a citizenship nature which meet or enhance the aims and objectives of the cadet organizations.
Colonel Robert Perron Award	N/A	Presented annually to the Cadet who attains the highest physical fitness test score. This award is paused for one calendar year as of June 28, 2023.
Air Force Association of Canada Medal		Awarded for excellence demonstrated on the Glider Pilot Training Course (GPTC) and the Power Pilot Training Course (PPTC). One medal shall be awarded to the top cadet, male or female, on both the GPTC and the PPTC at each of the five Cadet Flying Training Centres.
Army, Navy and Air Force Veterans in Canada Cadet Medal of Merit		Awarded at each CTC to the top cadet, male or female, for each of the following summer courses: Advanced Aviation Course; Drill and Ceremonial Instructor Course; Fitness and Sports Instructor Course; Survival Instructor Course; Air Rifle Marksmanship Instructor Course; Military Band - Intermediate Musician Course; Military Band - Advanced Musician Course; Pipe Band - Intermediate Musician Course; Pipe Band - Advanced Musician Course
Order of St. George Medal		Awarded to the top Staff Cadet(s) at each CTC.
Air Cadet Service Medal	Air Cadet Service Medal	Recognizes all air cadets who have completed four years of honourable service with no serious infractions. Single bars are awarded for each additional year to a maximum of two bars should a cadet have enrolled on their 12th birthday.
Cadet Certificate of Commendation		Awarded for outstanding deeds in attempting to save the life or property of another person. This award is not part of the order of precedence.

== Symbols ==
=== Flags ===
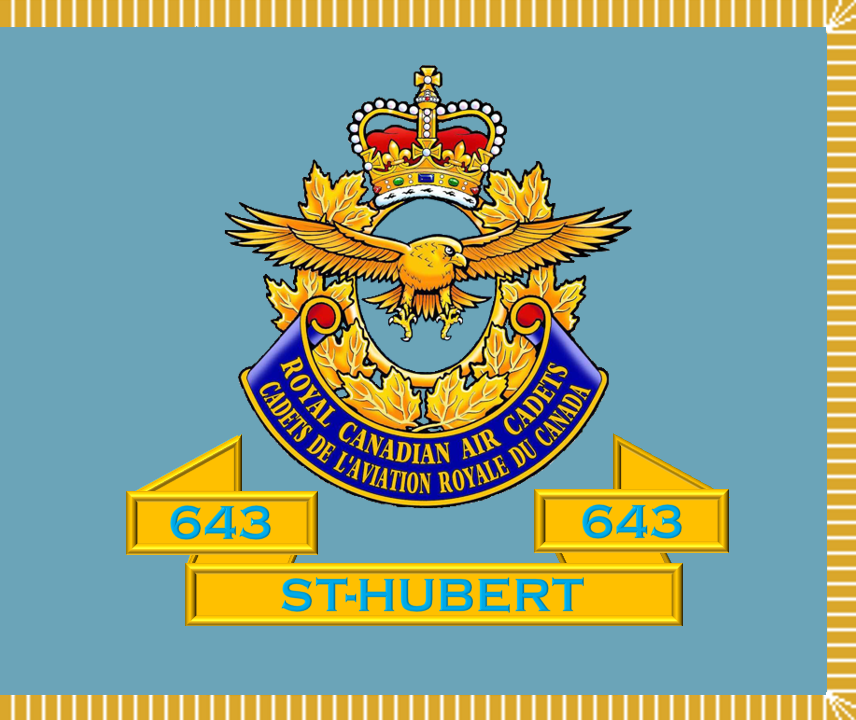
An example of a Royal Canadian Air Cadet Squadron Banner

In some squadrons, the ensign and squadron banner are carried by a flag party with the Flag of Canada (see image in the Local training section above), despite CAF custom being for one- or two-flag parties only. Subject to regional regulations, flag party escorts may carry deactivated drill-purpose rifles.

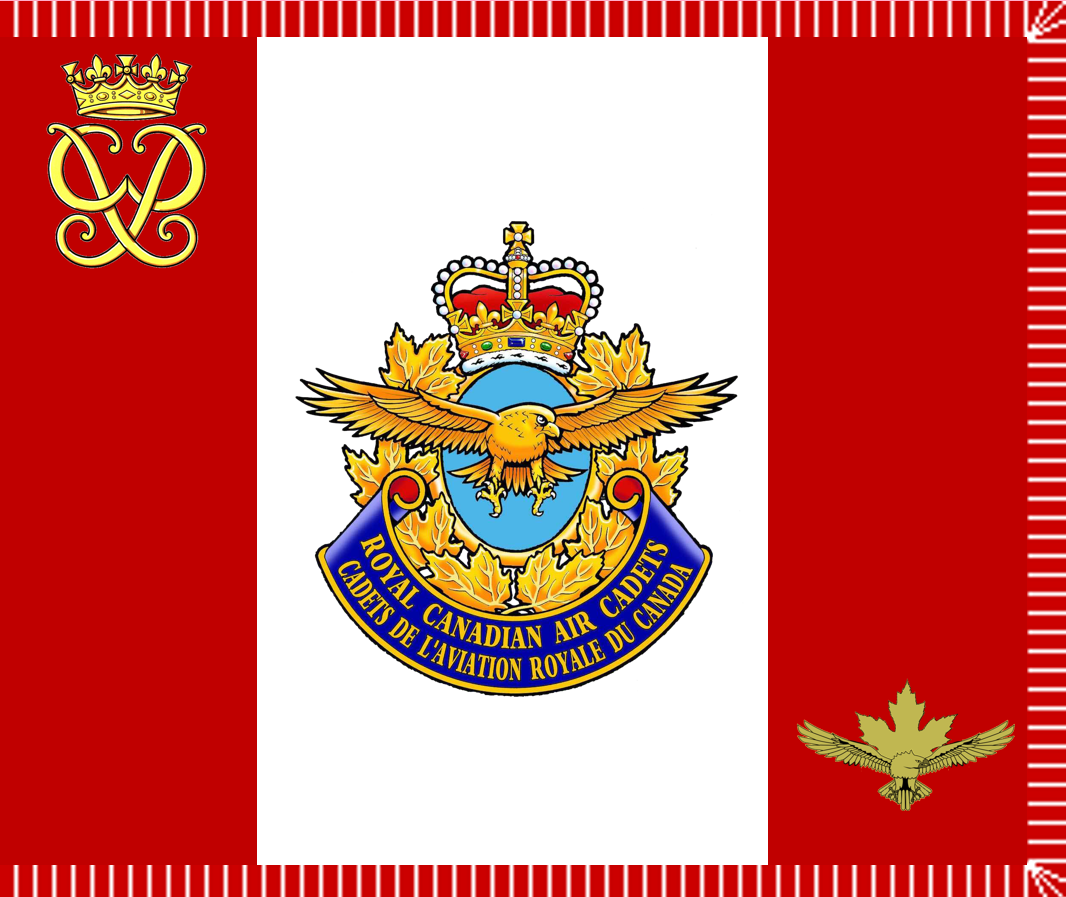
The Banner of the Royal Canadian Air Cadets

The Royal Canadian Air Cadets Banner is flown only on important ceremonial occasions to indicate the presence of a formed body of cadets, and, at the end of useful life, is deposited, after the manner of colors, in some suitable location. The banner was presented in 1991 at the Senior Leaders Course at CFB Cold Lake, and was paraded at the Senior Leaders Course graduation parades each summer until the course was replaced with the Leadership and Ceremonial Instructor Course. Though not consecrated, the flag parallels Air Force Command Colours and is carried in the same manner. Cadets pay compliments to the banner in a similar manner to a consecrated colour. Members of the CAF are not required to pay compliments to the banner but may do so as a courtesy. This banner was carried on parade at subsequent graduation parades until the discontinuing of the Senior Leaders Course in 2010. The Banner was then carried annually at CFB Trenton in a "Trooping the Banner" event held every year until its cessation in 2022.

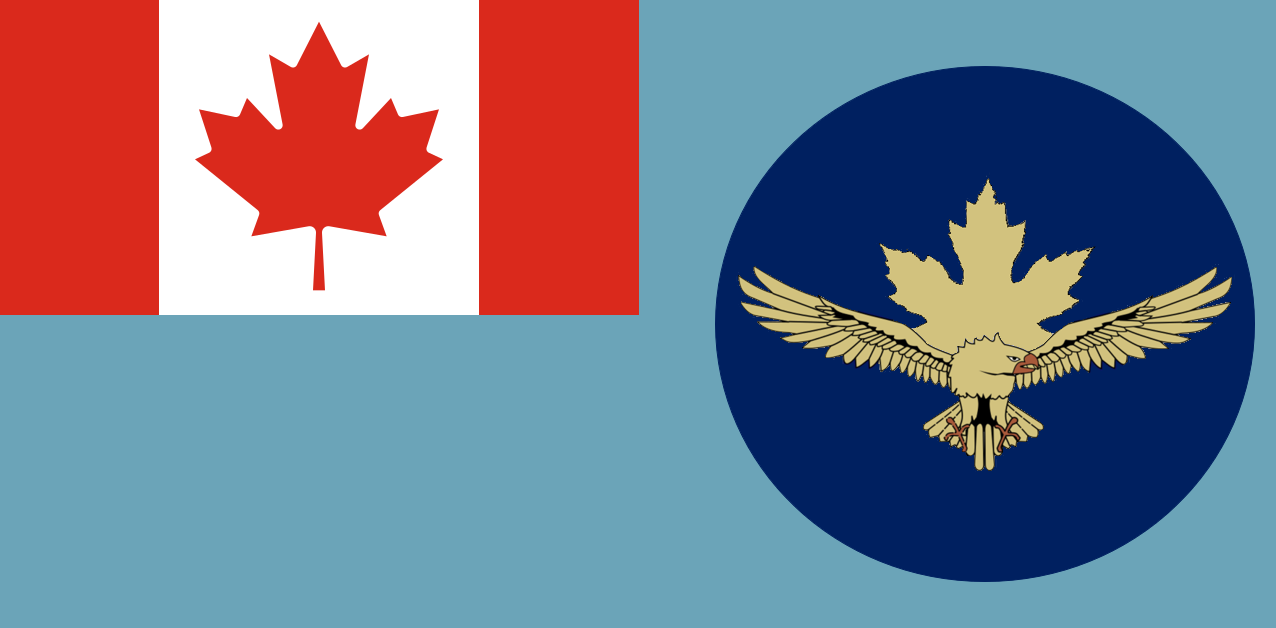
The Royal Canadian Air Cadets Ensign

Originally approved in 1941, the Royal Canadian Air Cadets Ensign was modified in 1971 to incorporate the National Flag in the canton. The flag parallels a Canadian Armed Forces command flag (as distinct from a Command Colour). The ensign is normally flown at the squadron and often carried as part of a flag party. It is always flown from a mast or pole at air cadet summer training centres.

The squadron banner parallels an Air Force Squadron Standard and is carried by squadrons as their specific unit identifier. Unlike a squadron standard, however, an air cadet squadron banner may not be consecrated nor can they emblazoned with battle honours. Though squadron banners may not be consecrated, they may be dedicated and may be laid up in a manner paralleling similar ceremonies for squadron standards. Compliments are paid to the squadron banner in the same manner as the Air Cadet Banner. The squadron's name and number are embroidered on the banner. The Air Cadet League did for a brief period allow the acquisition of squadron banners featuring the individual squadron's badge in place of standard design. It is unclear, should any of these banners require replacement, if anything other than the standard design will be authorized.

=== Badge ===
Badge

The badge of the Royal Canadian Air Cadets consists of a circlet surrounded by a wreath of maple leaves, superimposed with a flying falcon, the head to the sinister (left). The whole is crowned by the Royal crown — fashioned as a St Edward's Crown — to symbolize the monarchy of Canada as the Cadets' source of authority. This all rests on a scroll displaying the words "Royal Canadian Air Cadets/Cadets de l'aviation royale du Canada".

This badge is worn as an embroidered badge on the left side of the wedge cap and other formal headdress, and as an embroidered patch on the all-weather jacket. The badge is also embroidered on the air cadet beret. The original hat badge featured an eagle surmounted by a single maple leaf, with two underlying scrolls reading "Air Cadets Canada".

== Cadet Fitness Assessment and Incentive Program ==
The Cadet Fitness Assessment and Incentive Program replaced the old fitness testing program in the 2010-2011 training year. It is based on the FITNESSGRAM testing protocol produced by the Cooper Institute. The standards are currently being redeveloped to better align with policies on gender inclusion.

=== Fitness assessment ===
Component assessed	Testing exercise	Notes
Cardiovascular Endurance	20-m Shuttle Run Test/PACER	Takes approximately 15 minutes to conduct including explanation and running. Requires PACER CD track and 20m of space to run.
Muscular Strength	Push-ups	Done to a cadence of 20 reps/min. Requires CD track or other 20 reps/min cadence.
Muscular Strength	Curl-ups	Done to a cadence of 20 reps/min. Requires CD track or other 20 reps/min cadence. May also require mats.
Muscular Flexibility	Back Saver Sit and Reach	Requires a sturdy box and a ruler.
Muscular Flexibility	Shoulder Stretch	Does not require any equipment.

=== Incentive program ===
As of June 28, 2023, the incentive program has been paused for at least one calendar year to allow for redevelopment.

There are four incentive levels cadets can achieve based on their results in the fitness assessment: bronze, silver, gold, and excellence. How cadets score each event is based on their age and gender.

	Scoring criteria
20m Shuttle Run Test	Number of laps completed in time with the tones heard by cadets.
Push-ups	Number of push-ups completed in time with the cadence (20 reps/min).
Curl-ups	Number of curl-ups completed in time with the cadence (20 reps/min).
Back Saver Sit and Reach	Distance reached in centimetres.
Shoulder Stretch	Able to complete or not. If the cadet can touch on both sides, the achievement level is Excellent. Otherwise, the achievement level is Nil.

Once all events have been scored, after discarding their lowest score, cadets receive an overall incentive level in line with their lowest score. The results from the 20m shuttle run are never discarded. Cadets receive a badge worn on their DEU tunic that corresponds with their overall incentive level.

== Notable former air cadets ==
Name	Notability
Nazanin Afshin-Jam	Miss World Runner-Up 2003, human rights activist, married to former minister of justice Peter MacKay
Barbara Bonfiglio	Electronica disc jockey also known as Misstress Barbara
George Canyon	Country music singer
Maryse Carmichael	first female Snowbird and commanding officer of the Snowbirds
Joe Clark	Prime minister 1979–80
Earl Dawson	Manitoba politician and president of the Canadian Amateur Hockey Association
Mike de Jong	British Columbia politician
Gwynne Dyer	author, journalist, military historian
Garde Gardom	Lieutenant governor of British Columbia 1995–2001
Chris Hadfield	Fighter Pilot of the RCAF, Astronaut
Jeremy Hansen	Artemis II astronaut
Ray Hnatyshyn	Governor general 1990–95
Pierre Jalbert	actor
Kevin Moon	Member of South Korean boy band The Boyz.
Walter Natynczyk	Chief of the Defence Staff 2008–12 and past Canadian Space Agency President
Fred Penner	Musician and children's entertainer
Steven Point	Lieutenant governor of British Columbia 2007–12
Al Simmons (musician)	Musician and children's entertainer
Brian Tobin	Premier of Newfoundland and Labrador 1996–2000
Julielynn Wong	Physician, scientist and pilot

== See also ==
- History of the Cadet Instructors Cadre
- Canadian Forces
- Air Training Corps (UK)
- Australian Air Force Cadets
- New Zealand Air Training Corps
- Civil Air Patrol
