= RCSCC Calgary =

Royal Canadian Sea Cadet Corps Calgary
- Active: 1991 - Present
- Country: Canada
- Type: Youth Organization
- Part of: Canadian Cadet Organization
- Headquarters: Heritage Christian Academy, Calgary, Canada
- Motto(s): "Onward"
- Anniversaries: 22 May
- Website: rcscccalgary.ca

RCSCC Calgary is a Royal Canadian Sea Cadet Corps located in Calgary, Alberta, Canada that has trained youth aged 12–18 in the Royal Canadian Sea Cadets program since 1991.

== Background ==
The corps was formed in 1991 by Lieutenant(N) Bill Saddington and Lt(N) Robert Newton. The corps name was chosen to commemorate the first HMCS Calgary, a Flower-class corvette commissioned 16 December 1941, and paid off 15 June 1945. The corps is affiliated with the current HMCS Calgary (FFH 335) (II), a Halifax-class frigate commissioned into the Canadian Forces on 12 May 1995.

== Training program ==
Cadets in RCSCC Calgary are enrolled in the Royal Canadian Sea Cadets and complete a four-year training program in seamanship, marksmanship, sailing, drill, leadership and instructional technique. The program is supervised by Canadian Armed Forces officers of the Cadet Instructors Cadre. Many cadets have the opportunity to participate in summer training camps, exchanges and cruises aboard Royal Canadian Navy and Canadian Coast Guard vessels.

== Notable events ==
The corps' official birthday is 22 May 1991. This is the date a warrant was granted to operate the corps by the Navy League of Canada.

In 1995, RCSCC Calgary travelled to CFB Esquimalt where they were the first Royal Canadian Sea Cadet Corps to hold an annual inspection on board a Halifax-class frigate. The corps has subsequently maintained a close relationship with HMCS Calgary (FFH 335), visiting again in 2002, 2005 for the tenth anniversary of the ship's commissioning, and in 2012.

in June 2016, RCSCC Calgary recognized its 25th anniversary providing the Royal Canadian Sea Cadet program to the youth of Calgary at an event held at The Military Museums. The guest of honour for the 25th anniversary was former Prime Minister Stephen Harper. As an anniversary project, cadets researched the museum and archive holdings on HMCS Calgary (K231).

== Sponsor ==
RCSCC Calgary is sponsored by the Bow Valley Branch of the Navy League of Canada. The Navy League is responsible for recruiting cadets and CIC officers, supporting the implementation of the corps training program, supporting optional training activities, providing training facilities, providing insurance, and managing funds for the corps.

== Badge ==
The badge of RCSCC Calgary is similar to the badge used by the Canadian Patrol Frigate, with the name plate and maple leaf changed to reflect its use by a Royal Canadian Sea Cadet Corps. Designed by Surgeon Commander W. McLean RCNR, the badge's heraldic description is: Or, a bend wavy azure charged with a like bendlet argent. In front across the centre of a bow stringed fess-wise, and arrow point upwards in pale, both sable. The gold background of the badge indicates the wheat of the Prairies. The blue and white bend and the bow together symbolize the Bow River that flows through Calgary, while the bow and arrow also represent the First Nations of the area.

== Motto ==
RCSCC Calgary shares the motto Onward with its affiliated unit, HMCS Calgary. The motto was adopted from its use by The City of Calgary

== Number ==
RCSCC Calgary was originally formed with corps number 315. In 1995, Commanding Officer Lt(N) Robert Newton petitioned the Navy League and the Canadian Forces to change the corps number to 335, to reflect the hull number of the new Halifax-class frigate HMCS Calgary.

== Vessels ==
RCSCC Calgary operates a Sirius 21 class sailing yacht, SV Arrow. Donated in 2003, the vessel was manufactured by Vandestadt and McGruer Ltd. in Ontario, Canada. SV Arrow operates primarily on the Glenmore Reservoir in Calgary. While sailing as crew of the 21-foot vessel, cadets learn to maneuver under sail, conduct man overboard rescue drills, and anchor the vessel.

== Commanding officers ==
- Lieutenant(N) Bill Saddington CD 1991-1994
- Lieutenant(N) Robert Newton CD 1994-1997
- A/Lieutenant Commander Douglas Bourne 1997-2000
- A/Lieutenant-Commander Gregg Hatton-Fernley CD 2000-2002
- Lieutenant(N) Geoffrey Kneller 2002-2005
- Lieutenant(N) Robert Newton CD 2005-2007
- Lieutenant(N) Sylvain Bouliane CD 2007-2011
- Lieutenant(N) Dan Barnfield 2011-2014
- Lieutenant(N) Geoffrey Kneller CD 2014–2018
- Lieutenant(N) Jodi Hunter CD 2018-2022
- Captain Kirk Campbell CD 2022–2025
- Lieutenant(N) Robert Newton CD AdeC 2025-present
