= Royal Canadian Sea Cadets =

Military-run national youth program

- Cadets de la Marine royale du Canada (French)
- Badge of the RCSC
- Active: 1905-present
- Country: Canada
- Type: Youth Organization
- Part of: Canadian Cadet Organizations
- Headquarters: Ottawa, Ontario, Canada
- March: Quick: "Heart of Oak"

Commanders
- Current commander: Brigadier-General Jason Langelier

Insignia
- Flag

The Royal Canadian Sea Cadets (RCSC; French: Cadets de la Marine royale du Canada) is a Canadian national youth program sponsored by the Canadian Armed Forces and the civilian Navy League of Canada. Administered by the Canadian Forces, the program is funded through the Department of National Defence, with the civilian partner providing support in the local community. Cadets are not members of the Canadian Armed Forces.

== Overview ==
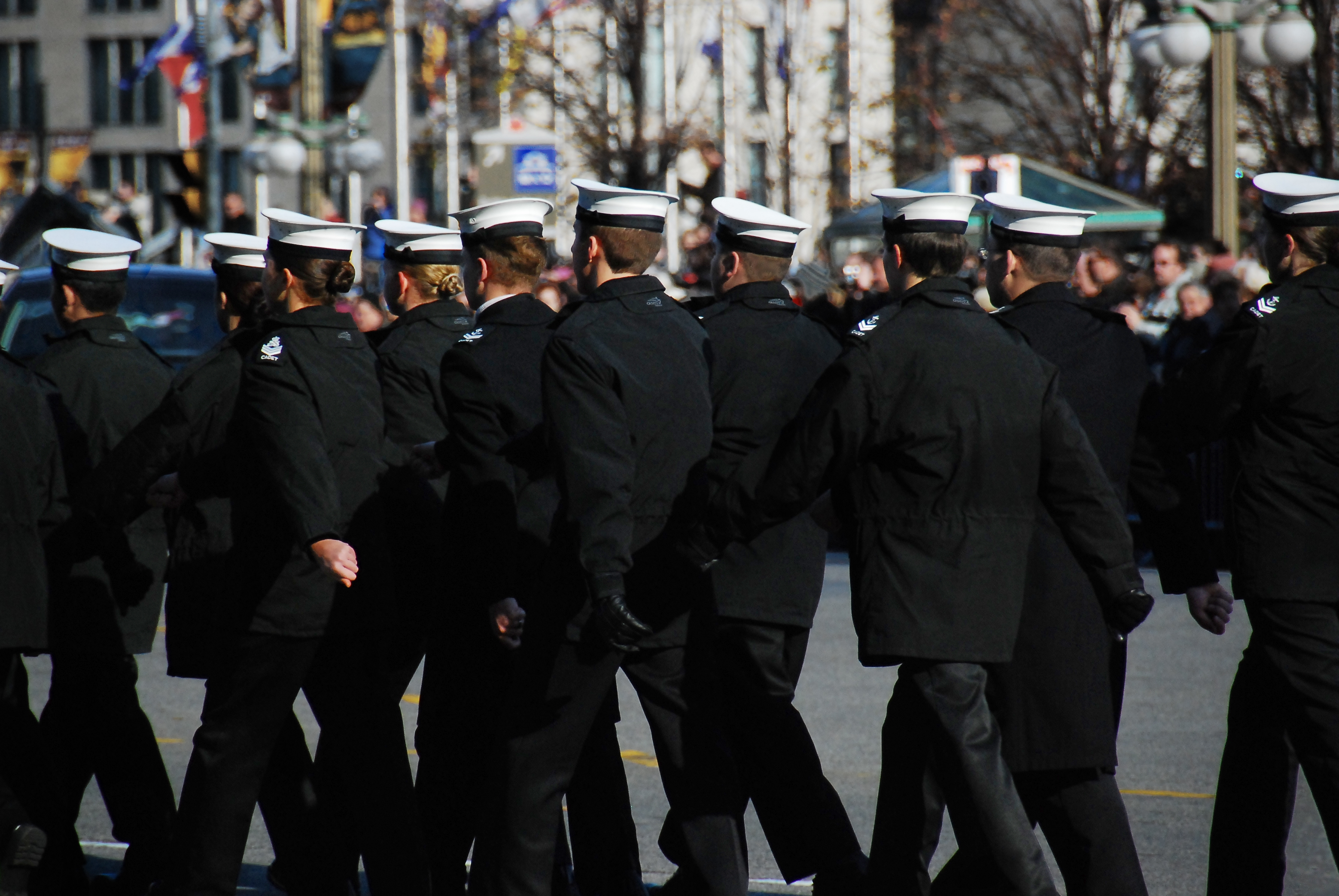
Royal Canadian Sea Cadets attend Remembrance Day Ceremonies

Along with the Royal Canadian Army Cadets and Royal Canadian Air Cadets, the Royal Canadian Sea Cadets form part of the Canadian Cadet Organizations. Although the RCSCC and the other cadet programs are sponsored by the Canadian Forces and the civilian Leagues, cadets are not members of the Forces and are not expected to join. In keeping with Commonwealth custom, the Royal Canadian Sea Cadets stand first in the order of precedence, before the Army Cadets and Air Cadets. This is in keeping with the Royal Navy's status as the Senior Service, a tradition common to most Commonwealth navies.

An inclusive program, youth aged 12 to 18 may join the RCSCC. There is no enrollment fee, and uniforms are loaned at no charge. The organization and rank system is similar to that of the Royal Canadian Navy. Adult leadership is provided by members of the Canadian Forces Reserve Subcomponent Cadet Organization Administration and Training Service, composed mostly of officers of the Cadet Instructor Cadre (CIC) Branch, supplemented, if necessary, by contracted Civilian Instructors, authorized adult volunteers, and, on occasion, officers and non-commissioned members of other CF branches. The CIC Branch is specifically trained to serve the Royal Canadian Sea, Army, and Air Cadet training programs, and like all reservists, they come from all walks of life and all parts of the community. Some are former cadets, and many have former regular or reserve force service.

=== Aim ===
The aim of the Royal Canadian Sea Cadets is to develop in youth the attributes of good citizenship and leadership; promote physical fitness, and stimulate the interest of youth in the sea, land and air activities of the Canadian Forces. The RCSC shares this aim with the Army and Air Cadets; however, each discipline focuses on its own parent element.

== History ==
=== Early days ===
In 1895, due to concern over the Royal Navy's ability to provide adequate naval defence, concerned citizens formed the Navy League, to promote interest in the problems of maritime trade and defence.

The League formed local branches throughout the United Kingdom and in other countries of the British Empire. The earliest Canadian branch was formed in Toronto. Its warrant (Warrant No. 5) is dated December 10, 1895, and currently hangs in the Navy League of Canada's National Office.

At that time, Canadian branches supported a cadet program called the Boys’ Naval Brigades, aimed at encouraging young men to consider a seafaring career and provide basic training in citizenship and seamanship.

=== Evolution ===
With the formation of the Canadian Naval Service in May 1910, the organisation was renamed from "Boys’ Naval Brigade" to "Navy League Sea Cadets," to permit closer liaison with the Navy. In 1942, King George VI graciously consented to be Admiral of the Navy League's Sea Cadets, and granted the "Royal" prefix, causing another name change, to the current "Royal Canadian Sea Cadets." Queen Elizabeth continued this Royal patronage and named His Royal Highness the Duke of Edinburgh as the Admiral of the RCSC. Finally, in 1941, the RCN became a joint partner with the Navy League in support of the RCSC.

=== Girls ===
In 1950, the Navy League of Canada established the Wrenette program for girls aged 13 to 18 years, though at least one corps (in Victoria, British Columbia) unofficially existed before that date. Starting in 1975, girls were permitted to become sea cadets (as well as army and air cadets), making the Wrenette Corps largely redundant. As a result, the Wrenette program steadily declined until it was finally disbanded in 1997.

=== Memorial ===
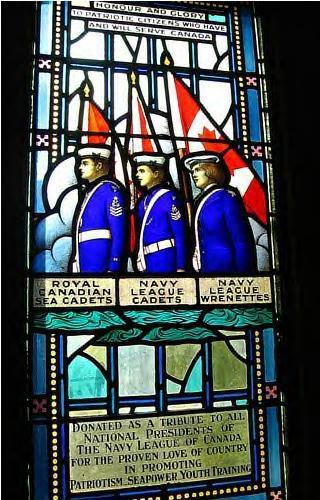
Navy League Wrennette Corp Navy League Cadet Corps (Canada) Royal Canadian Sea Cadets Memorial Stained Glass Window, Currie Hall, Currie Building, Royal Military College of Canada

At the Royal Military College of Canada, outside Currie Hall in Kingston, Ontario, stained glass windows relate to the history of the Royal Canadian Sea Cadets.

- Donated as a tribute to all national presidents of the Navy League of Canada for the proven love of country in promoting patriotism... seapower ... youth training, the window bestows 'Honour and Glory to patriotic citizens who have and will serve Canada.' The window features images of the Royal Canadian Sea Cadets, Navy League Cadets and Navy League Wrenettes.
- In memory of David H. Gibson, C.B.E. national president, Navy League of Canada, 1938–1952 a stained glass window features images of a young sailor and God behind the ships' wheel. The window is dedicated to Canadians who in defence of the country went down to the sea in ships. The window includes a poem by H.R. Gillarm: "Proudly in ships they sailed to sea. Ahead their goal, perhaps eternity. But with God as their pilot they had no fear facing all danger as their course was clear. Their cargo? The record of their life. Some good, some bad, some peace, some strife."

=== Navy League today ===
In 1995, the Navy League of Canada celebrated its 100th anniversary. The League promotes the same subjects today, as at its founding: knowledge of, and support for, maritime interests. On a national level, the League supports the International Exchange Program, certain scholarships, and the National Sea Cadet Regatta, while local branches provide vital logistical support to individual RCSC Corps.

== Corps ==
Individual cadets belong to units called Royal Canadian Sea Cadet Corps (RCSCC), or Corps de cadet de la Marine royale canadienne (CCMRC), which are the basic operating units of the program. Each corps consists of officers from the Cadet Instructors Cadre (CIC) Branch of the Canadian Armed Forces, Civilian Instructors (CI), Civilian Volunteers (CV), volunteer Regular/ Primary Reserve Force members, and cadets.

The entirety of a given corps organizes itself as a ship's company, employing the naval divisional system. Under this system, cadets become members of a division under a cadet petty officer (Divisional Petty Officer or DPO) and a CIC officer (Divisional Officer or DivO), although the officer position is sometimes filled by a Civilian instructor or Volunteer. Cadets parade by divisions, and are expected to route grievances and requests through the chain of command, running either directly from the DPO to DivO to the executive officer (XO) to the commanding officer (CO) or from the DPO to the cadet Regulating Petty Officer (RPO, the second senior cadet in the unit), to the cadet coxswain (cox'n, the senior cadet in a unit). The chain stops at the level able to deal with a concern – for example, a cadet's request for a new item of uniform might result in the DivO giving approval, and directing the cadet to visit Stores.

Sea Cadet Units also house key departments such as Training, Administration, and Supply. These departments are normally operated under the direction of a CIC officer but can also be operated by a Civilian Instructor, possibly with an assistant adult staff member, and a senior cadet. Units may also house teams such as Range (Marksmanship/Biathlon), Band, and Drill. Larger units may have dedicated staff for each of the teams.

Units generally adhere to the school schedule, meeting weekly for mandatory training, and carrying out additional training on weekends and other weeknights. The primary meeting is referred to as a parade/training night while training/activities conducted on weekends or on other weeknights are referred to by the activity/training occurring.

=== Key departments ===
- The Training Department comprises the Training Officer (TrgO), Training Chief or Petty Officer (Trg CPO/PO), and a staff of senior cadets and adult staff, often with other duties within the unit, serving as instructors. The Trg CPO/PO is often responsible for maintaining each cadets' training record, as well as handling resources and rating instructors.
- The Administration Department comprises the Administration Officer (AdmO) and Administration Chief or Petty Officer (Adm CPO/PO), who wears the quill-pen and scroll badge of a Ship's Writer, and may be referred to as such. Administration handles all incoming and outgoing mail, as well as maintaining corps records other than those specifically handled by Training or Supply.
- The Supply (or Stores) Department is composed of a Supply (or Stores) Officer, sometimes assisted by a senior cadet, who is entitled to wear the crossed-keys badge of a Storekeeper. The Supply Department is responsible for all equipment belonging to the corps; however, Supply tends to be primarily concerned with issuing cadets uniforms and related gear – bands often deal with their own gear, as do competitive teams.

=== Sponsoring group ===
- Along with the Army Cadets and Air Cadets, the Sea Cadets make up a program sponsored by the Canadian Forces funded primarily through the Department of National Defence. The Canadian Forces provides training, pay and allowances for reserve force cadet instructors; uniforms for instructors and cadets; transportation, facilities and staff for summer training; the training program and training aids; and policy and regulation regarding the operation of the cadet organization.
- The primary local community sponsor for Sea Cadets is a local branch of the Navy League of Canada that is often a committee of parents supported by groups such as Royal Canadian Legion branch, or some similar service club; i.e. Lions, Rotary, etc. The civilian Navy League provides local support by way of accommodation, utilities, liability insurance, transportation and training aids not provided by the CF. Navy League branches rely on community support, in the form of direct donations of money and goods, trusts, and various forms of fund-raising efforts. These last include sale of various items, much like bake and chocolate bar sales, street-corner pin and tag sales by cadets, and funds raised through the attached cadet unit's own canteen.
  - Canteen: Operated by the local sponsoring group with proceeds for corps activities, the canteen typically sells pop, chips, and the like at breaks in training. Some also offer cadets various necessities such as thread, boot polish, and starch. More ambitious corps canteens offer unit clothing, typically sweatshirts, T-shirts, belt buckles, etc., suitably emblazoned with unit insignia, mottos, and the like.

== Training and ranks ==
=== Ranks ===
In accordance with QR and O Cadets 4.11 the following are the rank badges of the Royal Canadian Sea Cadets:

In addition to the rank-specific criteria given below, all appointments are subject to the approval of the cadet's commanding officer, who generally promotes based on the advice of Divisional Officers and unit training staff.

As a note, the official phrasing for the Petty Officer and Chief Petty Officer ranks is "Petty Officer Cadet First (or Second) Class," and "Chief Petty Officer Cadet First (or Second) Class." However, outside of Cadet Administrative and Training Orders (CATO), and Queen's Regulations and Orders (Cadets) (QR&O(Cdt)), custom omits "Cadet" in casual reference. Thus, Petty Officer First Class is the customary rendering. Generally, where there is a need to distinguish between cadets and Canadian Forces members, the NCO ranks will be written or spoken as Cadet Petty Officer First Class, abbreviated as C/PO1.

Additionally, while it is customary within the organisation to refer to a cadet receiving a rank as being "promoted," the official documentation refers to such an act as an "appointment."

Ranks of the Royal Canadian Sea Cadets—Junior Cadet Ranks (OC-MC)
CDT 1	CDT 2	CDT 3
Ordinary Cadet—matelot de 3^{e} classe	Able Cadet—matelot de 2^{e} classe	Leading Cadet—matelot de 1^{re} classe
Rank of OC (Mat 3) granted upon enrollment, although customs dictate referring to cadets not yet sworn in as new entries; No prerequisites for this rank, except a minimum age of 12 years and a maximum age of 18 years; A new cadet may be sworn into the organization, making a promise of loyalty to the Crown and obedience to orders in front of the ship's company; also, Ordinary Cadets wear no rank insignia.	In order to earn a promotion to AC (mat 2) a cadet must: hold the rank of OC; maintain a satisfactory level of dress and deportment; and; be recommended by his/her divisional officer.; Hold a minimum of 6 months in previous rank.	In order to earn a promotion to LC (mat 1) a cadet must: hold the rank of AC; successfully complete Phase I training from the LHQ program; maintain a satisfactory level of dress and deportment; and; be recommended by his/her divisional officer.

Ranks of the Royal Canadian Sea Cadets—Petty Officers (PO2-PO1)
CDT 4	CDT 5	CDT 6
Master Cadet—matelot-chef	Petty Officer Cadet Second Class—maître de 2^{e} classe	Petty Officer Cadet First Class—maître de 1^{re} Classe
In order to earn a promotion to MC (matc), a cadet must: hold the rank of LC; successfully complete Phase II from the LHQ program; maintain a satisfactory level of dress and deportment; and; be recommended by his/her Divisional Officer.	In order to earn a promotion to PO2 (m 2), a cadet must: hold the rank of MC; successfully complete Phase III from the LHQ program; maintain a satisfactory level of dress and deportment; and; be recommended by his/her divisional officer.	In order to earn a promotion to PO1 (m 1), a cadet must: hold the rank of PO2; successfully complete phase IV from the LHQ program; maintain a satisfactory level of dress and deportment; and; be recommended by his/her divisional officer.

Ranks of the Royal Canadian Sea Cadets—Chief Petty Officers (CPO2-CPO1)
CDT 7	CDT 8
Chief Petty Officer Cadet Second Class—premier maître de 2^{e} classe	Chief Petty Officer Cadet First Class—premier maître de 1^{re} classe
In order to earn a promotion to CPO2 (pm 2), a cadet must: hold the rank of PO1 for at least 6 months; maintain a satisfactory level of dress and deportment; and; be recommended by the Merit Review Board.; Note: CPO2s are usually also given senior appointments such as Boatswain and sometimes Coxswain of their corps.	In order to earn a promotion to CPO1 (pm 1), a cadet must: hold the rank of CPO2 for at least 6 months; maintain a satisfactory level of dress and deportment; be recommended by the Merit Review Board; and; be a member of a corps large enough to be allotted its one CPO1 position and in which that position is vacant, except in the case of a transfer or transfers from another corps or squadron).; The cadet, upon being promoted to CPO1, is henceforth known as the "Coxswain" of their corps (should they not already hold that position).; Promotion to CPO1 may be considered the pinnacle of a sea cadet's service.

==== Forms of address ====
- Junior cadets are typically addressed by their last name by all ranks; however, a superior might address them as simply "cadet," especially in situations where names are not known, such as at multi-unit events.
- Petty officers are typically addressed by their juniors as "Petty Officer So-and-So," or, conversationally, as "P.O." Superiors and equals will often use last name only, sometimes prefacing it with "Mr." or "Miss."
- Chief petty officers are typically addressed by all personnel as "Chief So-and-So," or, conversationally, as "chief." Superiors and equals will rarely use last name only, though superiors might replace "chief" with "Mr." or "Miss."
- Additionally, cadets often hold an appointment in addition to their rank, and many of these are used as an alternate form of address, especially the following: coxswain (cox'n); corps gunner, chief gunner, or gunner's mate ("gunner"), drum major ("drum major" or "drummie"); bugler; messenger; and boatswain, boatswain's mate, chief boatswain's mate, and chief boatswain ("bosun" or "buffer").
- In formal situations (for example, being called up for an award or promotion), a cadet's full rank and last name is used "Cadet (rank) name."

=== Training ===
==== Additional training ====
Along with their mandatory weekly training, sea cadets may also participate in one or more of the activities below:

- Range Team: Most units will have at least one trained Range Safety Officer (RSO) and conduct, as part of the mandatory training program, training in safe and effective marksmanship using the Daisy Air Rifle. A number of corps field range teams, competing in cadet tri-service matches at the area, regional, and national level, while others simply offer a well-supervised recreational shooting program.
  - Firearm safety is given the highest priority throughout this training.
- Biathlon: An increasing number of RCSC Corps have formed biathlon teams, adding a new aspect to the long-standing marksmanship programs, and encouraging a high degree of athleticism and physical fitness. Ideally, cadets train and compete with Anschutz .22 target rifles; however, some corps train with air rifles in accordance with Olympic marksmanship standards.
  - Firearm safety is given the highest priority throughout this training as well.
- Sailing: The RCSC sailing program uses Sail Canada CANsail levels and material for all training. The sailing program uses small dinghies, typically Echo or 420 class vessels, although other comparable designs are used, including Lasers. Sail instructors are typically CIC Officers or Civilian Instructors who are members of the Area Sail Center. The Area Sail Center consists of a Coordinating Officer, several Sail Canada certified instructors and volunteer staff cadet instructors. Advanced training focus on competitive sailing and race organization and is normally done at a CTC during the summer.
- Band: Most units will try to support some sort of musical ensemble, whether drum and bugle, drum and bell (glockenspiel), a military band, or just a drum line. A few corps have a piper or two, while an even smaller group maintain pipe bands.
- Guard/ Honour Guard: Many units have a division called "Guard". The Guard is a division where anyone from the rank of AB and up can join. Most units carry the Lee-Enfield No. 4 Mk. 1 Long-Branch Rifle and wear webbing. The Guard Commander usually carries a cutlass in lieu of a rifle. The Guard normally parades after the Flag Party in ceremonies.

==== Summer training ====
Cadet Training Centres (CTC), provide additional training intended to support or complement that offered at the home unit from September to June. Across the board, cadets applying for summer training must have 75% attendance over the training year, as well as meeting certain course prerequisites.

Cadet Training Centers are staffed by members of the Canadian Forces, primarily members of the CIC, but also including other branches of the CF, as well as Civilian Instructors and senior cadets selected for employment as staff cadets. Sea Cadet STCs are commanded by a CIC officer of the rank of commander. Staff cadets are employed at the ranks of Petty Officer Second Class through Chief Petty Officer First Class, with a CPO1 being appointed as Cadet Coxswain. Staff cadets are paid at a daily fixed rate for the duration of their time as a Staff Cadet.

Sea Cadet CTCs are commissioned as "stone frigates," which is to say, naval shore establishments granted much the same standing as a seagoing unit.

===== Current Sea Cadet Training Centres (CTC) =====
- CTC HMCS Quadra, located in Comox, British Columbia, has operated as a Sea Cadet training facility since 1953. It was commissioned in 1956 and is the second largest summer training facility. It employs over 100 officers and 150 staff cadets each year. The centre occupies Goose Spit opposite Comox, and makes use of Highland Secondary School as an auxiliary training facility for classroom work, first aid, and music training. Quadra is the only Sea Cadet Training Centre in Canada to include all four trades plus two of the three specialty trades (Marine Engineering, and Shipwright). Cadets undergoing training as boatswains and marine engineers also undergo training in damage control at CFB Esquimalt. Quadra plays host to a number of international exchange cadets. In recent years, these have included contingents from South Korea, Japan, the United States, United Kingdom, Germany, Sweden, Australia, New Zealand, Bermuda, and the Netherlands. Since 2022, this has been the only training centre still with the HMCS prefix.
- CTC Trenton (HMCS Ontario) is a detachment located in Kingston, Ontario HMCS Ontario Sea Cadet Summer Training Centre began life as Cadets Camp Frontenac (sailing camp) on 4 July 1977, and was officially redesignated as HMCS Ontario Cadet summer Training Establishment on 13 July 1981 thus allowing Ontario to expand and to offer a wider range of training opportunities to sea cadets from across Ontario and Canada previously disciplines such as music, drill and ceremonial and the two-week general training course, and now only sail and seamanship. In the summer months Ontario's small cadre of full-time staff are supplemented by 110 officers, non-commissioned members and civilian instructors of the COATS and sea cadets who are offered summer employment as staff cadets. HMCS Ontario is also a year-round operation, responsible for sail training and the operational standards of nine sail centres and a staff of 80 part-time officers and civilian instructors who staff the sail centres located across the province of Ontario in the spring and autumn months. From 1982 to 2019 HMCS Ontario's main headquarters has been located at CFB Kingston with the main summer training centre located on the grounds of the Royal Military College. From 2022 onwards, its headquarters has been combined under CTC Trenton, and is now a detachment used for the Sail course.

Additionally, cadets may apply for a number of tri-service courses hosted by other training centres.

===== Former SCSTC =====
- HMCS Haida, the historic destroyer that fought in World War II and now a National Historic site, was home to a unique six-week-long boatswain trade training course during the summer months in the 1970s. At that time Haida was a museum ship located in Toronto, Ontario. Approximately 30 Sea Cadets would live aboard, sleep in hammocks like the original crew, and follow a realistic ship's routine for six weeks while training. They would also double as museum guides for periods during the day. On at least one occasion, select cadets were offered the opportunity to use their new skills after graduating from the course. In 1975 four cadets were selected to serve a three-week stint aboard Canadian Coast Guard vessels at sea, sailing from Halifax, Nova Scotia.
- SCSTC HMCS Avalon, located in St. John's, Newfoundland, was, at its closing, the smallest SCSTC in Canada. It offered training in either basic sail or beginner band.
- SCSTC HMCS Qu'Appelle was located at the Echo Valley Conference Centre, formerly the Fort San sanatorium, near Fort Qu'Appelle, Saskatchewan, an hour north east of Regina, Saskatchewan. HMCS Qu'Appelle offered the introductory Two-Week General Training course, and Trade Groups One through Three of the Music and Sail courses. HMCS Qu'Appelle last offered courses in 2004.
- SCSTC HMCS Gimli, HMCS Qu'Appelle's predecessor, was located in Hnausa, Manitoba.
- SCSTC HMCS Québec, located in Sainte-Angèle-de-Laval, Quebec, was the only SCSTC that was entirely delivered in French. It trained cadets in all four trades as well as the Shipwright specialty course. Québec occupied a school during the summer season. The training centre opened its doors in 1975, and offered its last summer courses in 2012.
- Camp Tillicum, located outside of North Bay, Ontario on Callander Bay was a detachment of HMCS Ontario offering Two-Week General Training and Basic Leadership courses. The camp closed in 1986.
- SCSTC HMCS Micmac located in the Windsor Park region of Halifax, Nova Scotia. It trained cadets in Boatswain and Submariner. The camp closed in late 1988. Boatswain cadets were then transferred to HMCS Acadia.
- CTC HMCS Acadia, located in Cornwallis, Nova Scotia, was the largest summer training facility. During the course of the summer, Acadia was home to roughly 1,200 cadets who were undergoing training. Acadia provided training in Music, Sail, Drill and Ceremonial, and Seamanship training. In 2006, Acadia celebrated 50 years as a Sea Cadet Summer Training Centre. Acadia closed to cadets in 2020, and was not reopened once summer training resumed in 2022.

== Honours and awards ==
The Canadian Cadet Movement maintains its own Honours and Awards system. Cadets may be awarded these based on many criteria including bravery, citizenship, service, outstanding performance on a summer training course, and are worn on the right side of the cadet uniform, under their name tag. In addition, cadets may also wear any orders, decorations, and medals of Canada they have been awarded on the left side of their uniform.

Within the system, there are several honours and awards common to all three cadet elements and some that are unique to each. A cadet who transfers from one element to another may continue to wear any medals awarded from their previous service, but in general, sea cadets may be eligible for the following nine honours and awards, and are in the order of precedence:

Medal	Image	Description
Cadet Award for Bravery		The Cadet Award of Bravery may be awarded to a cadet who performs an outstanding deed of valour involving risk of life in attempting to save the life or property of others.
Lord Strathcona Trust Fund Medal		The Lord Strathcona Trust Fund Medal, most commonly referred to as the Lord Strathcona Medal, is the highest award which can be bestowed upon a cadet in recognition of exemplary performance in physical and military training.
Royal Canadian Legion Cadet Medal of Excellence		The Royal Canadian Legion (RCL) Cadet Medal of Excellence is awarded in recognition for individual endeavours in citizenship that meet or enhance the aims and objectives of the cadet movement.
Navy League of Canada Medal of Excellence		Awarded annually to the most proficient cadet(s) within each Division of each corps.
Army, Navy and Air Force Veterans in Canada Cadet Medal of Merit		The Army, Navy and Air Force Veterans in Canada (ANAVETS), as a legacy to its desire to promote excellence and awareness of the CCO, has established the Army, Navy and Air Force Veterans in Canada Cadet Medal of Merit. One medal shall be awarded at each CTC to the top cadet, male or female, for each Instructor level course.
Order of St. George Medal		Awarded to the top Staff Cadet(s) at each CSTC.
Sea Cadet Service Medal		This medal is presented to a Sea Cadet that has successfully completed four years of honourable service within the RCSC program. Single bars are awarded for each additional year of service.
Cadet Certificate of Commendation		Awarded for outstanding deeds in attempting to save the life or property of another person. This award is not part of the order of precedence.

== Vessels ==
Vessels	Type	Details	Origins
420	Sailing dinghy	Double or single hand, monohull	
Echo	Sailing dinghy	Double or single hand, monohull	
Laser	Sailing dinghy	Single hand, monohull	
Orca class	Patrol craft training	Royal Canadian Navy training and patrol tender	
Cape Islander	Sea Cadet training vessel	Leased vessels used at HMCS Acadia	

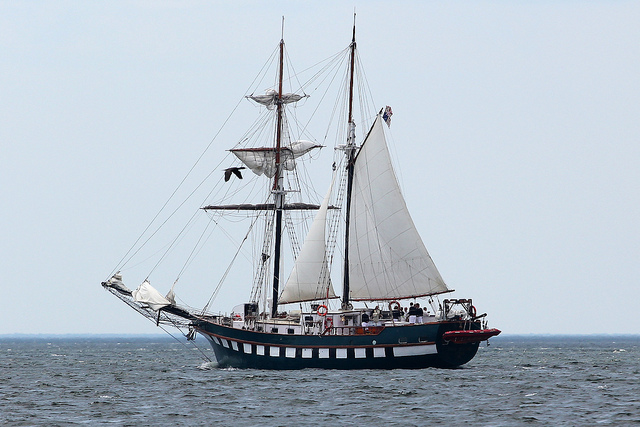
Fair Jeanne

Fair Jeanne, built by Captain (N) Thomas G. Fuller, does fall and spring youth sail training group trips on the Great Lakes and St. Lawrence Seaway for organizations such as the Royal Canadian Sea Cadets, Girl Guides of Canada, corporate groups and for people who are working towards The Duke of Edinburgh's Awards.

== Symbols ==
=== Flags ===
The Sea Cadets have used a variety of flags during their history: some corps flew the White Ensign until 1929; they then used the Canadian Blue Ensign and the flag of the Navy League of Canada until 1953. In that year, the Chief of Naval Service approved a design for the Royal Canadian Sea Cadet Flag: a white flag with the Union Flag in the canton, and, on the fly, the badge of the Cadets, a gold anchor on a blue roundel surrounded by red maple leaves and surmounted by a Naval Crown. In 1976, the Sovereign approved a new design, which replaced the Union Flag in the canton with the Maple Leaf Flag.

Royal and Commonwealth Navy's White Ensign, from formation until 1965

Canadian Blue Ensign, the Royal Canadian Navy's jack, 1910–1922

Canadian Blue Ensign, the Royal Canadian Navy's jack, 1929–1953

Flag of the Navy League of Canada, 1929–1953

Flag of the Royal Canadian Sea Cadets (approved by the Chief of Naval Service in 1953), 1953–1976

Current flag of the Royal Canadian Sea Cadets, 1976–present

=== Badge ===
The badge is the service emblem of the RCSC, and it is worn on cadet-issued parkas. It is also depicted on the flag of the Royal Canadian Sea Cadets. It is used as a cap badge on the beret worn with Order of Dress C4C.

=== Uniform ===
These are the uniforms of the Royal Canadian Sea Cadets. The uniforms are classified by a number system that lays them out as uniforms C1, C2, C5, etc. Uniforms C1A, C3A, C3B, C5, and C5A are issued upon joining, along with Winter Accoutrements.

Order of Dress C1A (Ceremonial Dress):

- White-top
- Corps title cap tally
- Short sleeve white dress shirt
- Black tie
- Rank slip-ons
- Trousers
- Trousers belt
- Tunic
- Tunic belt
- Lanyard
- Wool socks
- Parade boots
- Medals and pins, if the cadet has earned them

Order of Dress C2 (Mess Dress): C1A, a white shirt and bowtie is worn by male cadets and a white shirt with crossover tie is worn by female cadets. However, this order of dress is optional and the white shirt and tie are not purchased at public expense. When the tie is worn, the lanyard is not worn. This is very rarely worn.

Order of Dress C3A (Service Dress): C1A, but ribbons replace medals.

Order of Dress C3B (Service Dress): C3A, minus the tunic

Order of Dress C3E (Service Dress): C3A, but black undershirt replace the short sleeve shirt.

Order of Dress C5 (Sea Training Uniform or STU):

- Black ball cap with Corps title
- Black undershirt
- 'Postman's blue' shirt
- Trousers
- Trousers belt
- Wool socks
- Parade boots

Order of Dress C5A (STU): C5, minus the Postman's blue shirt.

Order of Dress C5E (Sports Dress) (May be issued kit or personal):

- Sports shorts
- T-shirt
- Running shoes
- Tilley hat

Order of Dress C5B (Field Training Dress or Combats)

- Black beret with RCSC cap badge OR tan tilley hat OR black ball cap
- Olive drab field jacket
- Olive drab field pants
- Field belt
- Wool socks
- Combat boots

Order of Dress C5C (Field Training Dress or Combats): C5B minus the field jacket

Winter Accoutrements (for wear with any order of dress in cold weather):

- Cadet Parka with outer shell and removable liner
- Black gloves
- Black toque with white anchor insignia and the word CADET

==== Special Orders of Dress ====
These orders of dress are only used on particular occasions, or by cadets in a Highland pipes and drums band.

Order of Dress C1 (Traditional Dress):

- RCN Uniform (prior to unification)
- RCSC Shoulder flashes, traditional or current
- Seaman's cap with appropriate cap tally
- Chains may replace the lanyard if applicable

Order of Dress C1H (Highland Dress):

- Glengarry Headdress with Sea Cadet metal headdress insignia
- White Dress-Shirt
- Black Tie
- Lanyard
- Tunic (cut-away to accommodate the sporran)
- Kilt Maple leaf tartan
- Boots
- Hosetops
- Flashes, garter
- Spats
- White belt
- Sgian Dubh
- Sporran, hair
- Kilt Pin
- Medals
- Pins

Order of Dress C1H (same code): As above, without tunic.

== Key personages ==
=== Admiral of the Royal Canadian Sea Cadets ===
The first Admiral of the Royal Canadian Sea Cadets was George VI, King of Canada, assuming the role in 1942, when the Navy League Sea Cadets became the Royal Canadian Sea Cadets.

Prince Philip, Duke of Edinburgh, as a member of the Canadian Royal Family, was appointed Admiral of the Royal Canadian Sea Cadets in 1953.

== Honorary Members ==
- Captain (N) Dr. Marc Garneau was appointed as Honorary Captain of the Royal Canadian Sea Cadets; the appointment was not renewed.

== See also ==
- Cadets (youth program)
- Cadets Canada - corporate identity
- Canadian Cadet Movement
- History of the Cadet Instructors Cadre
- RCSCC Calgary
