= Lord Strathcona Medal =

Medal awarded to Canadian cadets

- Obverse and reverse of the Lord Strathcona Medal
- Type: Cadet service medal
- Country: Canada
- Presented by: Corps Commanding officer
- Eligibility: See text
- Ribbon: Azure, or, argent, vert, argent, or, azure
- Undress ribbon

The Lord Strathcona Medal is one of the highest awards that can be bestowed upon a Canadian cadet. It is awarded in recognition of exemplary performance in physical and military training.

The medal is administered by the Lord Strathcona's Trust. An Organisation founded by Donald Alexander Smith, 1st Baron Strathcona in 1909. Smith endowed the trust with a $500 000 donation (roughly $14,000,000 in 2026 adjusted for inflation) to improve the physical and intellectual capabilities of youth in Canada, by encouraging habits of self-discipline, good citizenship and patriotism. The first Medals were struck and awarded in 1923.

== Description ==
This decoration consists of a circular copper medallion with ribbon. On the obverse, in relief, is the effigy of Lord Strathcona, below the motto Agmina Ducens ("Leading the ranks"). On the reverse, the inscription "Strathcona Trust – Cadets of Canada" along the edge and "Honneur au mérite" at the centre. The ribbon, 1.25 inches (3.2 cm) wide, has three vertical burgundy stripes separated by two vertical green stripes. This medal is presented with an undress ribbon.

== Criteria to receive the medal ==
The criteria for the Lord Strathcona Medal are found in CATO 13-16. The criteria are the following:

- have a high level of physical fitness;
- have a high level of community service;
- have qualified to a training level of at least:
  - Phase III in the Royal Canadian Sea Cadets;
  - Silver Star in the Royal Canadian Army Cadets;
  - Level 3 in the Royal Canadian Air Cadets;
- have met all requirements of their corps’ mandatory training program;
- have met all requirements of their corps’ extracurricular support training program;
- have completed three years as a cadet; and
- be regarded by peers and supervisors as exemplifying the model cadet.
