= HMCS Quadra =

Cadets Canada training centre at Comox, British Columbia

- Type: Military institute Naval training institute
- Established: 1952
- Undergraduates: 900
- Location: Comox, British Columbia, Canada

HMCS Quadra is a Cadet Training Centre (CTC) located at Goose Spit in Comox, British Columbia, Canada. It primarily serves Royal Canadian Sea Cadets, though Air Cadets and Army Cadets attend as well.

== History ==
HMCS Quadra was first used by cadets in 1943 under the name HMCS Naden (III). The camp was then named Cadet Camp Comox, and renamed HMCS Quadra in 1956. The name comes from the Spanish explorer from the west coast, Bodega y Quadra. In 1952, the center hosted its first group of over 700 boys from the Royal Canadian Sea Cadets. Female cadets have been enrolled since 1975.

== Courses ==
HMCS Quadra hosts Cadets for 10 summer courses;

- Sail 1
- Sail 2
- Seamanship
- Ship’s Boat Operator
- Aviation Technology and Aerospace
- Advanced Aviation
- Introduction to Military Band
- Military Band Musician
- Advanced Aviation
- Power Pilot, though training occurs off-base.

Hosting approximately 900-course cadets annually, it primarily serves Sea Cadets, though Army and Air Cadets participate in courses that are not Sea Cadet-exclusive. The Training Centre employs over 300 staff including COATS personnel, regular force personnel, reserve force personnel, civilian instructors, Department of National Defence (DND) public servants, and Staff Cadets. Cadets come from across Canada as well as select international cadets. Quadra has hosted cadets from Australia, Bermuda, Hong Kong, Japan, South Korea, Netherlands, Sweden, the United Kingdom, and the United States of America in past years. When not in use for summer training, the centre is used for weekend exercises and cadet events.

== Sources ==
- Anderson, Suzanne (1997). Good Morning, Quadra!: The History of HMCS Quadra. Half Acre. ISBN 978-0-921271-11-6. OCLC 37651834.
