= Royal Canadian Legion Cadet Medal of Excellence =

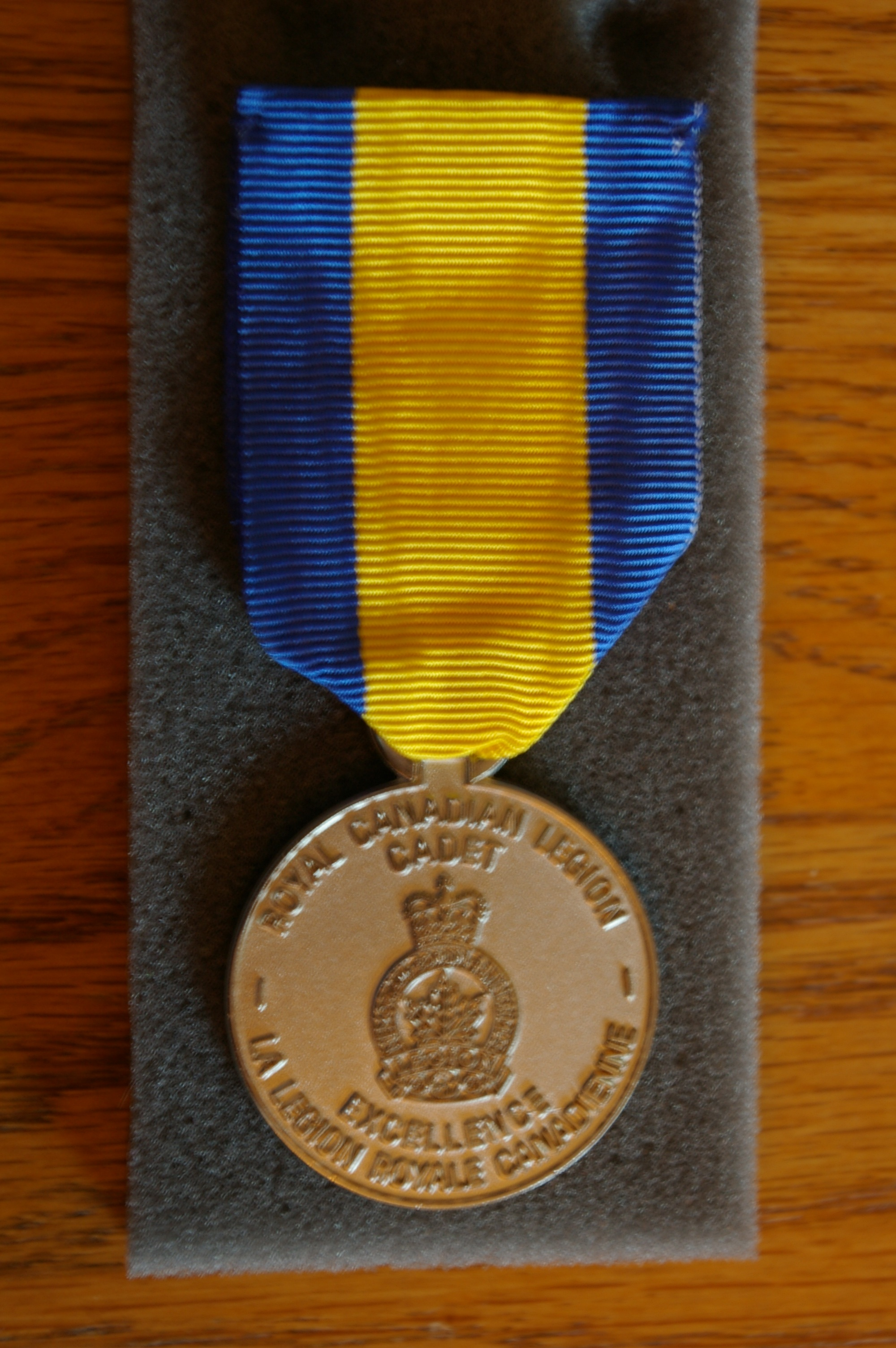
Medal of the Royal Canadian Legion Medal of Excellence

Ribbon bar of the Royal Canadian Legion Medal of Excellence

The Royal Canadian Legion Cadet Medal of Excellence is a Canadian Cadet medal, which is available to members of the Royal Canadian Sea Cadets, Royal Canadian Army Cadets, and the Royal Canadian Air Cadets. The Legion Medal of Excellence is awarded by the Royal Canadian Legion to Cadets who have displayed excellence in citizenship outside of the Cadet program. The medal is awarded to one Cadet per corps/squadron annually. The Legion Medal of Excellence is worn centred on the right breast pocket, touching the top of the pocket. This medal is not part of the Canadian Honours System and should only be worn on cadet and legion uniforms.

== Application ==
Applying for the medal is a task performed at a Cadet's local headquarters (LHQ). Different LHQs have different methods with which a Cadet may apply for the medal, but all applications must be approved by the commanding officer and the local Legion branch. The medal is always presented to the candidate by a member of the local Legion branch, and usually during a ceremony.

The Cadet Medal of Excellence is awarded to a Cadet who:

- Meets all requirements of the corps/sqn annual mandatory and optional training programs.
- Participated in a minimum of three community service events, in addition to those supported by the cadet corps/sqn.
- Is regarded by peers and superiors as exemplifying the model cadet.
- Enhanced the cadet corps/sqn.

== Description ==
The medal is circular and silver-coloured, with the Royal Canadian Legion insignia inscribed on the obverse. Above the insignia are the words "ROYAL CANADIAN LEGION CADET", and below it is written "EXCELLENCE", as well as the French translation of the above words.

The award consists of three things:

1. The award of the Medal of Excellence and the criteria for selection, is based on recognized national standards, thus ensuring the prestige and significance of the medal are maintained and identified throughout Canada.

2. Each unit in the Canadian Cadet organization is eligible to award one medal per training year, with the award being made only once to an individual cadet.

3. The Commanding Officers of cadet corps are encouraged to seek the participation of The Royal Canadian Legion in the selection process, where possible, in order to emphasize the citizenship aspect of the award. The Commanding Officer of the cadet corps, in consultation with the corps officers and sponsor committee, is the approving authority for the award of the medal
