= Alfred Williams Carter =

Canadian First World War flying ace

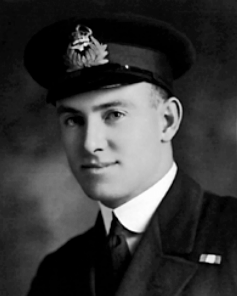
- Born: 29 April 1894; Fish Creek, Alberta
- Died: 17 December 1986 (aged 92); Vancouver, British Columbia
- Military career
- Allegiance: United Kingdom
- Branch: Royal Naval Air Service; Royal Air Force
- Rank: Squadron Leader
- Units: No. 3 Squadron RNAS, No. 10 Squadron RNAS/No. 210 Squadron RAF
- Awards: Distinguished Service Cross Canada Gazette 01/07/1946 OBE(civil) Officer of the Order of the British Empire (civil) for Civil Aviation in Canada London Gazette 03/06/1919 MBE (military) Member of the Order of the British Empire Captain, RAF

Squadron Leader Alfred Williams "Nick" Carter OBE MBE DSC (29 April 1894 – 17 December 1986) was a Canadian First World War flying ace, officially credited with 17 victories.

== Biography ==
The son of David and Martha Carter, Alfred Carter was born near Calgary and enlisted in December 1915 in Ontario, where he had been a university student. In 1916 he joined the Royal Naval Air Service and attended flight school in Florida.

Serving with 3 Wing, in June 1917 he was posted to No. 3 Naval Squadron and claimed five victories flying the Sopwith Pup. In July 1917 he was transferred to No. 10 Naval Squadron as a flight commander and he scored four more victories, now flying the Sopwith Triplane.

For his victories in July, he was awarded the Distinguished Service Cross with the medal citation:

This officer has at all times led his patrols with great courage, skill and pertinacity, often engaging superior numbers of hostile aircraft [...].

— Supplement to the London Gazette (29 August 1917)

By November 1918, he had scored another eight victories with the Sopwith Camel. His war time tally included one balloon, one aircraft captured, four (and one shared) destroyed, nine (and one shared) 'out of control'.

After the war he worked for the Air Board until April 1922 and in 1923 he owned and operated an automobile dealership in Victoria, British Columbia.

In 1939 he, along with Alan Duncan Bell-Irving, formed the first Air Cadet Squadron in Canada which at the time was known as the 1601 Air Force Cadet Wing and is now 111 Pegasus Squadron in Vancouver. That first Squadron was run entirely by the DND in conjunction with the 111 RCAF Squadron which was also based in Vancouver at the time. He was the commander of 1601 Wing until he left to assist with the formation of the Air Cadet League of Canada and eventually served as the first National President of the League.

He won the OBE and MBE. He died on 17 December 1986.
