= Avesnes-lès-Bapaume =

- Commune
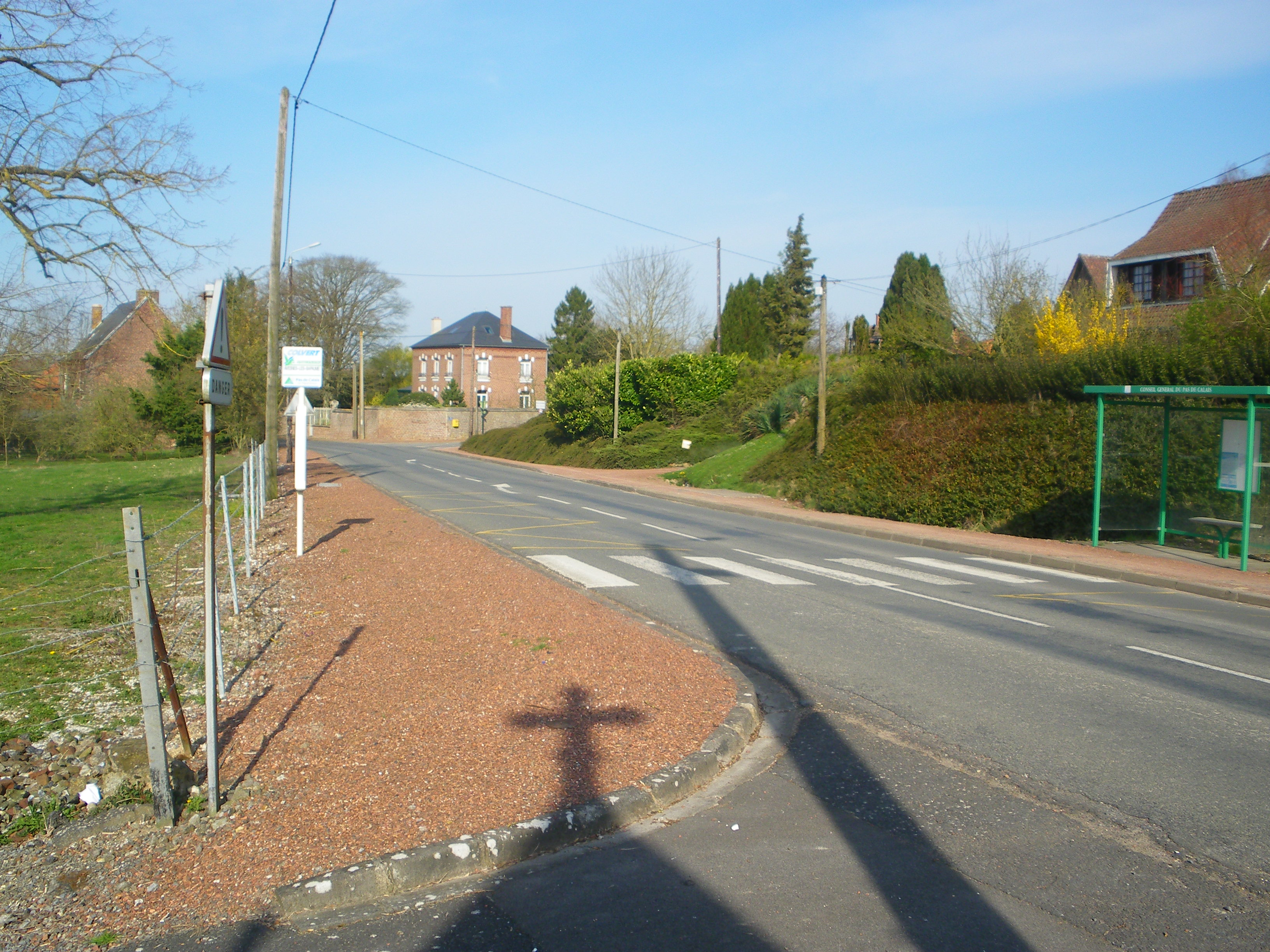
- A general view of Avesnes-lès-Bapaume

- Coat of arms
- Location of Avesnes-lès-Bapaume
- Location within France Location within Hauts-de-France
- Coordinates: 50°06′19″N 2°50′29″E
- Country: France
- Region: Hauts-de-France
- Department: Pas-de-Calais
- Arrondissement: Arras
- Canton: Bapaume
- Intercommunality: CC du Sud-Artois

Government
  - Mayor (2020–2026): Bernard Dobœuf
- Area^{1}: 3.09 km^{2} (1.19 sq mi)
- Elevation: 114 m (374 ft)
- Highest elevation: 132 m (433 ft)
- Lowest elevation: 102 m (335 ft)
- Population (2023): 174
  - Density: 56.3/km^{2} (146/sq mi)
- Time zone: UTC+01:00 (CET)
  - Summer (DST): UTC+02:00 (CEST)
- INSEE/Postal code: 62064 /62450
- ^{1} French Land Register data, which excludes lakes, ponds, glaciers > 1 km^{2} (0.386 sq mi or 247 acres) and river estuaries.

Avesnes-lès-Bapaume (French pronunciation: [avɛn lɛ bapom], literally Avesnes near Bapaume) is a commune in the Pas-de-Calais department in northern France.

== Geography ==
A small farming village, adjacent to the west of Bapaume, on the roads from Bapaume to Albert and Achiet-le-Grand.

== Population ==
Historical population
Year	Pop.	±% p.a.
1968	170	—
1975	179	+0.74%
1982	193	+1.08%
1990	163	−2.09%
1999	164	+0.07%
2007	142	−1.78%
2012	146	+0.56%
2017	162	+2.10%
2023	174	+1.20%
Source: INSEE

== See also ==
- Communes of the Pas-de-Calais department
