= HMCS Calgary =

Several Canadian naval units have been named HMCS Calgary.

- HMCS Calgary (K231) (I), a Flower-class corvette that served in the Royal Canadian Navy during the Battle of the Atlantic.
- HMCS Calgary (FFH 335) (II), a Halifax-class frigate commissioned into the Canadian Forces on 12 May 1995.

== Battle honours ==
- Atlantic, 1942–45
- Biscay, 1943
- Normandy, 1944
- English Channel, 1944–45
- North Sea, 1945
- Arabian Sea
