= Roderick Ogle Bell-Irving =

Canadian Army officer

Roderick Ogle Bell-Irving DSO, MC, (15 January 1891 – 1 October 1918) was a Canadian army officer from Vancouver.

Bell-Irving had a distinguished military career during WWI. He was part of the Canadian Expeditionary Force that was assembled at Valcartier, Quebec, at the outbreak of the war. He shipped to France in 1915 as a lieutenant in the 16th Infantry Battalion (the Canadian Scottish). He was in action throughout the war and achieved the rank of acting lieutenant-colonel before his death in battle on 1 October 1918.

Roderick Ogle Bell-Irving was posthumously awarded the Distinguished Service Order in 1919. He had also been much decorated and recognized for his valour during the war. Five brothers, who also served in the war, survived the conflict.
