= Army, Navy and Air Force Veterans in Canada =

ANAVETS
- Active: 1840-Present
- Country: Canadian
- Type: non-profit (veterans organization)
- Role: service organization
- Patron: Charles III

The Army, Navy & Air Force Veterans in Canada, also known as ANAVETS and ANAF for short, is a non-profit Canadian ex-service organization (veterans' organization) founded in 1840, with more than 18,000 members throughout Canada. Membership includes people who have served as military, Royal Canadian Mounted Police, provincial and municipal police, direct relatives of members and also affiliated members. The ANAVETS club also accepts membership from any person who is interested.

== History ==
With the formation date being lost to time, the organization quotes 1840 as an approximate date of foundation. It is known that in 1840 Queen Victoria gave a charter to create an ANAVETS unit in Montreal. But units may have dated to as early as the Conquest of New France in the 1700s.

The name of the organization was derived from the remnants of British and French regiments who stayed behind when they were recalled at the end of their tours of duty to protect the colonies. To exchange information on service benefits and to fraternize, the men organized. They called themselves "the Army Veterans in Canada" to distinguish themselves from other colonies. This reference to Canada became integral as incorporated by the Government of Canada in 1917

After the War of 1812, sailors from the Royal Navy who remained in Canada joined with the Army Veterans and the name was changed to the Army and Navy Veterans in Canada.

During the Second World War, the organization welcomed members of the newly formed air force. The name was again changed by an amendment to the Act of Incorporation, by Parliament in 1946 to the Army, Navy & Air Force Veterans in Canada. ANAVETS has become an acceptable short form to identify the organization.

== Purpose ==
1. To unite fraternally, persons who have served in Her Majesty's armed forces or any auxiliary force thereof or in the armed forces or any auxiliary force of any nation allied to the British Commonwealth of Nations engaged in an active combat zone and persons who support the purposes and objects of the Association, which Association shall be a non-partisan and non sectarian body for the purpose of good fellowship, mutual improvement and assistance, and patriotic endeavour and service to Canada and the British Commonwealth of Nations;
2. To increase the public influence of veterans by organization, by parades and by giving as an entity expressions of opinion upon public questions affecting the rights of veterans or concerning the welfare of the whole or any part of the British Commonwealth of Nations;
3. To stimulate the spirit of patriotism in Canada and promote closer unity and co-ordination within the British Commonwealth of Nations;
4. To assist the British Commonwealth of Nations when occasion requires in enlisting recruits for Her Majesty's forces;
5. To acquire, maintain and operate clubs, homes and meeting places for the benefit of veterans, and to furnish, stock and equip the same with such furniture, furnishings, plants, animals, implements, equipment, appliances, libraries, and means of entertainment and amusement, as may be considered desirable by the Association;
6. To acquire and maintain museums in connection with any premises of the Association for the interest, education, or benefit of its members;
7. To levy upon its members, or upon bodies to whom it has granted charters as authorized herein, fees or assessments from time to time as may be required for the support of the Association and the carrying out of its objects; and to raise funds for the purpose of the Association by such means, with others, as providing entertainment, operating canteens and places of refreshment and amusement; and
8. To assist any of Her Majesty's naval, military naval air forces on active service, by establishments for the rest and comfort of, and as meeting places for those composing such forces.

== Organization ==
ANAVETS has a three-tier system that follows the political system of Canada. At the federal level, Dominion Command is located in Ottawa. This is the Headquarters of the organization and it oversees all units. At the provincial level British Columbia, Alberta, Saskatchewan, Manitoba, Ontario, Quebec, and Nova Scotia have respective Provincial Commands which preside over the provincial activities of their units. Also on the unit level, each unit is run by an elected Executive Council.

== See also ==
- List of Canadian organizations with royal patronage
- Veterans of Foreign Wars
- Returned & Services League of Australia
- Royal New Zealand Returned and Services' Association
- Remembrance Day
- ANAVET Cup
