= Cadets Canada elemental ranks =

Canadian Cadet rank structure

The rank structures of the three elements of the Canadian Cadet Organizations are as follows, comparatively:

CCO	Royal Canadian Air Cadets	Royal Canadian Army Cadets*	Royal Canadian Sea Cadets	Insignia Description
Senior Ranks
CDT 8	Warrant Officer First Class / Adjudant(e) 1^{re} classe (WO1 / adj 1)	Chief Warrant Officer / adjudant(e)-chef (CWO / adjuc)	Chief Petty Officer First Class / premier maître de 1^{re}classe (CPO1 / pm1)	A simplified version of the 1957 Coat of arms of Canada. (Normally worn only by the Squadron Chief Warrant Officer (Air), Coxswain (Sea), or Regimental Sergeant Major (Army) of a corps/squadron, as selected through the merit review board process, though multiple cadets may hold this rank in the event of a transfer or transfers from other corps or squadrons).
CDT 7	Warrant Officer Second Class / Adjudant(e) 2^{e} classe (WO2 / adj 2)	Master Warrant Officer / adjudant(e)-maître (MWO / adjum)	Chief Petty Officer Second Class / premier maître de 2^{e} classe (CPO2 / pm2)	Air: A St Edward's Crown within a wreath of maple leaves. Army, Sea: A St Edward's Crown within a laurel wreath. (Worn only by cadets selected through the merit review board process).
CDT 6	Flight Sergeant / sergent de section (FSgt / sgts)	Warrant Officer / adjudante (WO / adj)	Petty Officer First Class / maître de 1^{re} classe (PO1 / m1)	Air: A three-bar chevron surmounted by a St Edward's Crown. Army and Sea: A St Edward's Crown.
CDT 5	Sergeant / sergeant (Sgt / sgt)	Sergeant / sergent (Sgt / sgt)	Petty Officer Second Class / maître de 2^{e} classe (PO2 / m2)	Air: A three-bar chevron Army: A three-bar chevron surmounted by a maple leaf. Sea: A three-bar chevron surmounted by two crossed anchors.
Junior Ranks
CDT 4	Flight Corporal / caporal de section (FCpl / cpls)	Master Corporal / caporal-chef (MCpl / cplc)	Master Cadet / matelot-chef (MC / matc)	Air: A two-bar chevron surmounted by a St Edward's Crown. Army: A two-bar chevron surmounted by a maple leaf. Sea: A two-bar chevron surmounted by an anchor.
CDT 3	Corporal / caporal (Cpl / cpl)	Corporal / caporal (Cpl / cpl)	Leading Cadet / matelot de 1^{re} classe (LC / mat1)	A two-bar chevron.
CDT 2	Leading Air Cadet / Cadet de l'air de 1^{er} Classe (LAC / ca 1)	Lance Corporal / lance caporal (LCpl / lcpl)	Able Cadet / matelot de 2^{e} classe (AC / mat2)	Air: One propeller. Army and Sea : A one-bar chevron.
CDT 1	Air Cadet / cadet de l'air (AC / ca)	Cadet / cadet (Cdt / cdt)	Ordinary Cadet / matelot de 3^{e} classe (OC / mat 3)	No insignia.

Per the Queen's Regulations and Orders for Canadian Cadet Organizations, all cadet ranks include the word "Cadet", whether at the front, or if the rank already includes it. In practice, the word is omitted unless to prevent confusion between actual service members. An example being at Cadet Training Centres, or COATS non-commissioned members.

*If an Army Cadet Corps has an affiliation with a unit of the Canadian Army that traditionally has different titles for the Ranks of "Private", "Corporal", and "Master Corporal", then they are then entitled to make use of those alternative titles for the ranks of "Lance Corporal", "Corporal", and "Master Corporal" in their units as well. Additionally, the second Army Cadet rank of "Lance Corporal", formerly "Private", was changed in January 2010, due to the French translation "Soldat" also translating to the word "Soldier" in English.

Branch	Master Corporal	Corporal	Lance Corporal
Royal Canadian Armoured Corps	Master Corporal / caporal-chef (MCpl / cplc)	Corporal / caporal (Cpl / cpl)	Trooper / cavalier (Tpr / cav)
Royal Regiment of Canadian Artillery	Master Bombardier / bombardier-chef (MBdr / bdrc)	Bombardier / bombardier (Bdr / bdr)	Gunner / artilleur (Gnr / artr)
Corps of Royal Canadian Engineers	Master Corporal / caporal-chef (MCpl / cplc)	Corporal / caporal (Cpl / cpl)	Sapper / sapeur (Spr / spr)
Royal Canadian Corps of Signals	Master Corporal / caporal-chef (MCpl / cplc)	Corporal / caporal (Cpl / cpl)	Signalman / signaleur (Sgmn /[sig)
Corps of Royal Canadian Electrical and Mechanical Engineers	Master Corporal / caporal-chef (MCpl / cplc)	Corporal / caporal (Cpl / cpl)	Craftsman / artisan (Cfm / artn)
Royal Canadian Infantry Corps (RCIC) members of guards regiments	Master Corporal / caporal-chef (MCpl / cplc)	Corporal / caporal (Cpl / cpl)	Guardsman / garde (Gdm / gde)
RCIC members of rifle regiments	Master Corporal / caporal-chef (MCpl / cplc)	Corporal / caporal (Cpl / cpl)	Rifleman / carabinier (Rfm / car)
RCIC members of fusilier regiments	Master Corporal / caporal-chef (MCpl / cplc)	Corporal / caporal (Cpl / cpl)	Fusilier / fusilier (Fus / fus)
Highland (Scottish) Regiment	Master Corporal / caporal-chef (MCpl / cplc)	Corporal / caporal (Cpl / cpl)	Highlander / montagnarde (Hldr / mon)
RCIC members of voltigeur regiment	Master Corporal / caporal-chef (MCpl / cplc)	Corporal / caporal (Cpl / cpl)	Voltigeur / voltigeur (Vol / vol)

In the guard regiments, Warrant Officers are known as "Colour Sergeants".

== Former Sea Cadet Ranks ==
Rank	Insignia	Insignia Description	Former Location in Rank Structure	Notes
Sea Cadet Summer Training Centre Chief Petty Officer / Capitaine d'armes de CIECM (SCSTC CPO / cddc)		Simplified version of the 1957 Arms of Canada over two crossed sabres.	Above CPO1, at CDT-9 (Special) Grade	Formerly worn by a Sea Cadet appointed as Coxswain of a Sea Cadet Summer Training Centre (SCSTC). This rank was quietly retired in September of 2022, with each SCSTC's ranking Cadet now wearing normal CPO1 slip-ons, in line the practices already in place at Air and Army Cadet training centres.
Qualified Petty Officer First Class / maître de 1^{re} classe (admissible) (QPO1 / cm 1 [A])		A three-bar chevron surmounted by two crossed anchors and a St Edward's Crown.	Between Petty Officers Second and First Class	Used from 1953-2008, when Corps were only allowed to promote a limited number of Petty Officers First and Second Class. When these limits were reached, cadets qualifying for promotion to the aforementioned ranks would be appointed as QPO1/2s temporarily and fully promoted when slots opened up. Some corps also referred to these ranks as Acting Petty Officer First/Second Class.
Qualified Petty Officer Second Class / maître de 2^{e} classe (admissible) (QPO2 / cm 2 [A])		A three-bar chevron surmounted by an anchor.	Between Master Cadet and Petty Officer Second Class	Used from 1953-2008, when Corps were only allowed to promote a limited number of Petty Officers First and Second Class. When these limits were reached, cadets qualifying for promotion to the aforementioned ranks would be appointed as QPO1/2s temporarily and fully promoted when slots opened up. Some corps also referred to these ranks as Acting Petty Officer First/Second Class.

== See also ==
- Royal Canadian Air Cadets
- Royal Canadian Army Cadets
- Royal Canadian Sea Cadets
- Navy League Cadet Corps (Canada)
- Ranks of the cadet forces of the United Kingdom
- New Zealand Cadet Forces ranks
- Australian Defence Force Cadets ranks
- Ranks of the Junior Reserve Officers' Training Corps
- Cadet grades and insignia of the Civil Air Patrol
