= Ranks of the Junior Reserve Officers' Training Corps =

Members of the Junior Reserve Officer Training Corps are assigned various ranks, the titles and insignia of which are based on those used by the United States Armed Forces (and its various ROTCs), specifically the United States Army, U.S. Marine Corps, U.S. Navy, U.S. Air Force, U.S Space Force, and the U.S. Coast Guard. Rank requirements vary with schools. Some specialties require cadets to pass promotion tests while others only require recommendations by superiors and the needs of the unit.

== Cadet Officer Ranks ==
Grade*	C/O-6**	C/O-5	C/O-4	C/O-3	C/O-2	C/O-1
Army JROTC & MCJROTC
Army JROTC & MCJROTC	Cadet Colonel (Army JROTC: C/COL) (MCJROTC: C/Col)	Cadet Lieutenant Colonel (Army JROTC: C/LTC) (MCJROTC: C/LtCol)	Cadet Major (Army JROTC: C/MAJ) (MCJROTC: C/Maj)	Cadet Captain (Army JROTC: C/CPT) (MCJROTC: C/Capt)	Cadet First Lieutenant (Army JROTC: C/1LT) (MCJROTC: C/1stLt)	Cadet Second Lieutenant (Army JROTC: C/2LT) (MCJROTC: C/2ndLt)
NJROTC & CGJROTC
NJROTC & CGJROTC	Cadet Captain*** (C/CAPT)	Cadet Commander (C/CDR)	Cadet Lieutenant Commander (C/LCDR)	Cadet Lieutenant (C/LT)	Cadet Lieutenant Junior Grade (C/LTJG)	Cadet Ensign (C/ENS)
AFJROTC & SFJROTC
AFJROTC & SFJROTC	Cadet Colonel (C/Col)	Cadet Lieutenant Colonel (C/Lt Col)	Cadet Major (C/Maj)	Cadet Captain (C/Capt)	Cadet First Lieutenant (C/1st Lt)	Cadet Second Lieutenant (C/2d Lt)
Grade*	C/O-6**	C/O-5	C/O-4	C/O-3	C/O-2	C/O-1
* Although the positions and titles of rank match those of the Armed Forces' pay grades, JROTC cadets are not serving members of the military, and receive no pay, and only receive benefits or privileges based upon the situation of the time (staying in military quarters, and using base exchanges, commissaries, dining facilities, and MWR facilities while on training trips, etc.) This is in direct contrast to Cadets/Midshipmen of the Senior (University Level) ROTC programs, in which those students can receive pay/stipends, benefits, and privileges, depending upon their contract status.
** Each service's JROTC structure allows for cadet officer grades no higher than C/O-6. The only instances of JROTC cadets having a higher cadet officer grade than C/O-6 are within Chicago Public Schools' districtwide, joint-services JROTC structure called the City Corps Staff, which is separate from any one school’s unit chain of command.
*** Cadet Captain is the rank that the leader of a NJROTC unit holds if the unit has reached the cadet enrollment requirements to be rated as a regiment. It is a relatively rare rank. As of June 2013, there are only 5 regimental-sized units out of the 584 NJROTC units worldwide.

== Cadet Enlisted Ranks ==
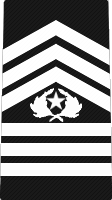
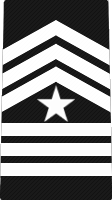
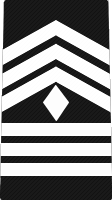
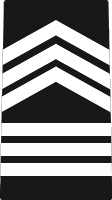
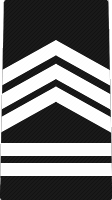
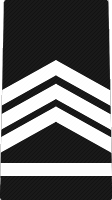
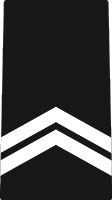
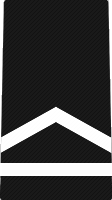
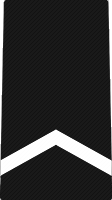
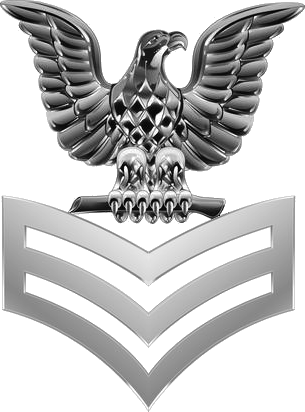
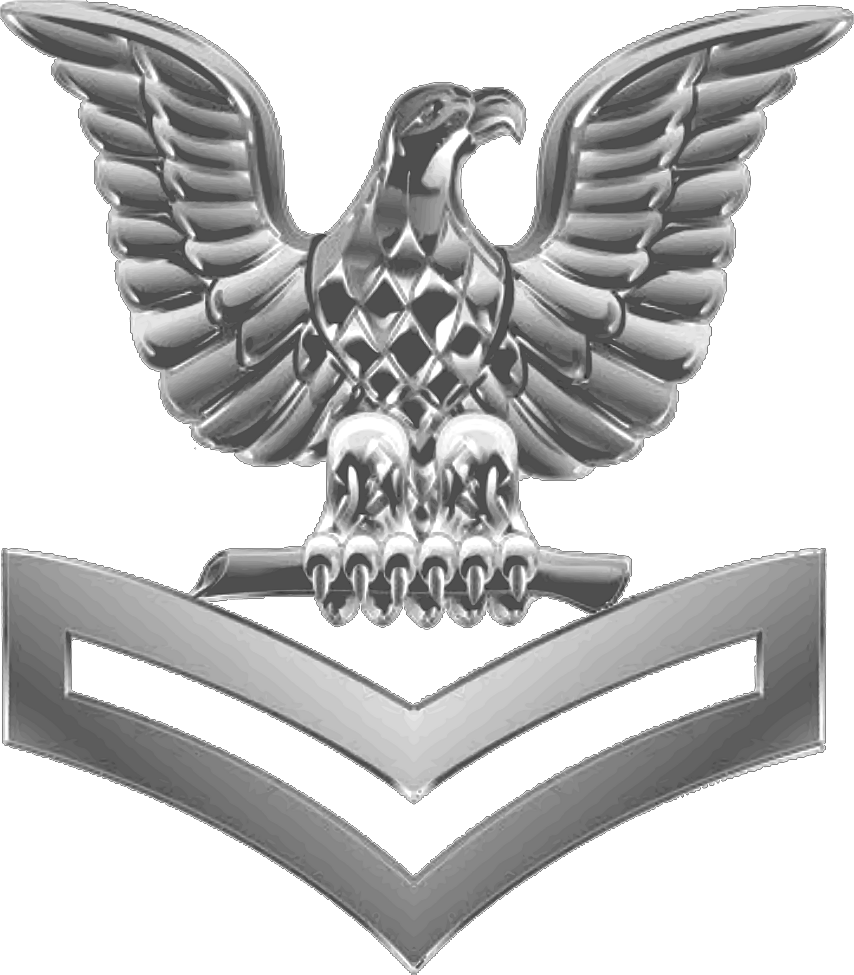
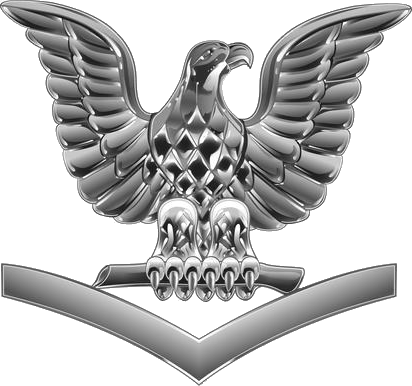
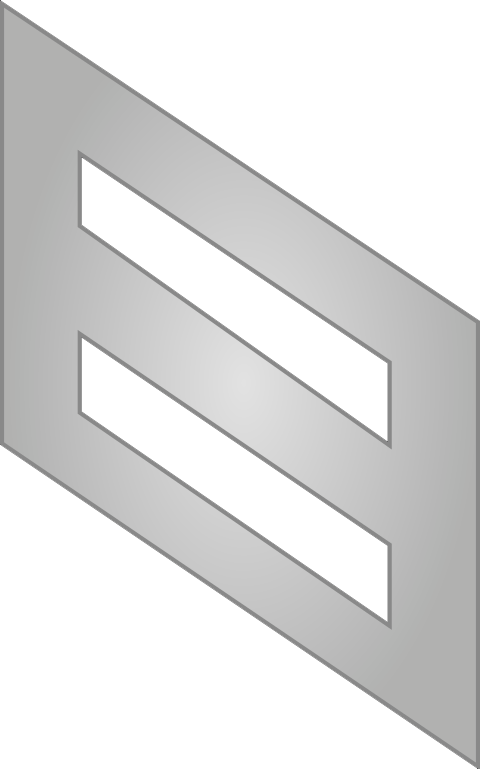
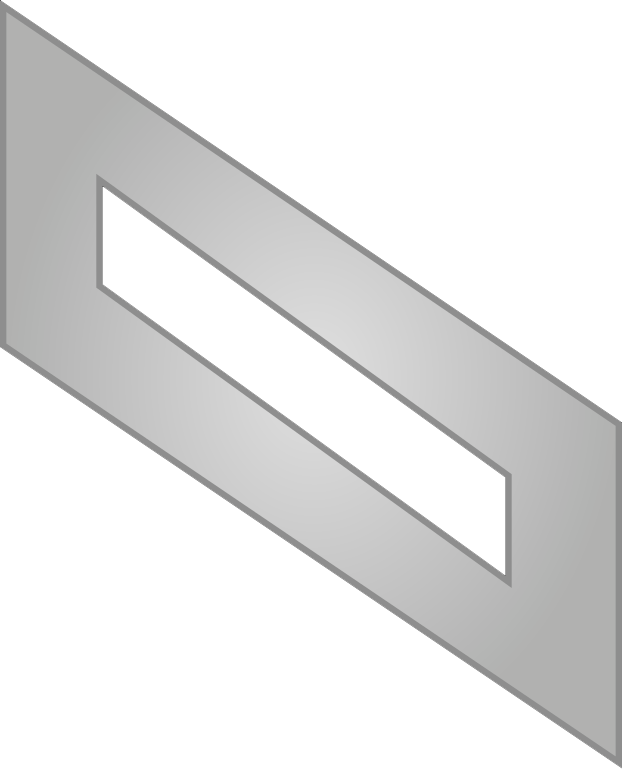
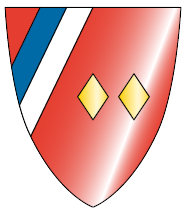
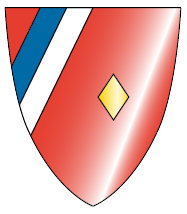
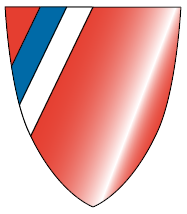
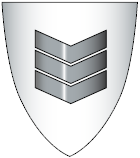
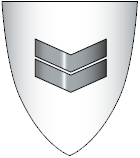
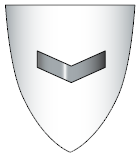
Grade	C/E-9		C/E-8		C/E-7	C/E-6	C/E-5	C/E-4	C/E-3	C/E-2	C/E-1
Army JROTC											No Insignia
Army JROTC	Cadet Command Sergeant Major (C/CSM)	Cadet Sergeant Major (C/SGM)	Cadet First Sergeant (C/1SG)	Cadet Master Sergeant (C/MSG)	Cadet Sergeant First Class (C/SFC)	Cadet Staff Sergeant (C/SSG)	Cadet Sergeant (C/SGT)	Cadet Corporal (C/CPL)	Cadet Private First Class (C/PFC)	Cadet Private (C/PVT)	Cadet Private (C/PVT)
NJROTC & CGJROTC											No insignia
NJROTC & CGJROTC	Cadet Master Chief Petty Officer (C/MCPO)		Cadet Senior Chief Petty Officer (C/SCPO)		Cadet Chief Petty Officer (C/CPO)	Cadet Petty Officer First Class (C/PO1)	Cadet Petty Officer Second Class (C/PO2)	Cadet Petty Officer Third Class (C/PO3)	Cadet Seaman (C/SN)	Cadet Seaman Apprentice (C/SA)	Cadet Seaman Recruit (C/SR)
MCJROTC											No insignia
MCJROTC	Cadet Sergeant Major (C/SgtMaj)		Cadet First Sergeant (C/1stSgt)		Cadet Gunnery Sergeant (C/GySgt)	Cadet Staff Sergeant (C/SSgt)	Cadet Sergeant (C/Sgt)	Cadet Corporal (C/Cpl)	Cadet Lance Corporal (C/LCpl)	Cadet Private First Class (C/PFC)	Cadet Private (C/Pvt)
AFJROTC & SFJROTC											No insignia
AFJROTC & SFJROTC	Cadet Chief Master Sergeant (C/CMSgt)		Cadet Senior Master Sergeant (C/SMSgt)		Cadet Master Sergeant (C/MSgt)	Cadet Technical Sergeant (C/TSgt)	Cadet Staff Sergeant (C/SSgt)	Cadet Senior Airman (C/SrA)	Cadet Airman First Class (C/A1C)	Cadet Airman (C/Amn)	Cadet Airman Basic (C/AB)
AFJROTC & SFJROTC	Cadet Chief Master Sergeant (C/CMSgt)		Cadet Senior Master Sergeant (C/SMSgt)		Cadet Master Sergeant (C/MSgt)	Cadet Technical Sergeant (C/TSgt)	Cadet Sergeant (C/Sgt)	Cadet Specialist 4 (C/Spc4)	Cadet Specialist 3 (C/Spc3)	Cadet Specialist 2 (C/Spc2)	Cadet Specialist 1 (C/Spc1)
Grade	C/E-9		C/E-8		C/E-7	C/E-6	C/E-5	C/E-4	C/E-3	C/E-2	C/E-1

== See also ==
- Ranks of the Civil Air Patrol
- Ranks of the cadet forces of the United Kingdom
- Cadets Canada Elemental Ranks
- New Zealand Cadet Forces ranks
- Australian Defense Force Cadets ranks
