= Ranks of the cadet forces of the United Kingdom =

The following table displays the ranks of the Community Cadet Forces (Army Cadet Force, the Sea Cadet Corps, and the Air Training Corps), the Combined Cadet Force, the Volunteer Cadet Corps (RMVCC and RNVCC). This table is based on equivalent rank structures within the cadet forces as detailed in regulations of the SCC, RMC, and the Air Cadets.

== Cadet ranks ==
Cadet NCOs wear the issued cadet rank slides. The titles of some ranks in the ACF and CCF Army may vary as cadet detachments are affiliated to British Army regiments and adopt their terminology. More senior cadet ranks may be restricted to a set number per area.

Although promotion is based on merit rather than progression through the training syllabuses, certain criteria must be met before a cadet is eligible for promotion:

Whilst the CCF regulations provide an equivalency table purely for the CCF, there is no official equivalency between the other cadet forces.

Cadet service	Cadet under officers	Cadet senior NCOs					Cadet junior NCOs				Cadets	Recruits
CCF Navy Cadets												
CCF Navy Cadets	Cadet under officer	Warrant officer cadet			Chief petty officer cadet	Petty officer cadet	Leading cadet	Able 3* cadet	Able 2* cadet	Able 1* cadet	Naval cadet	New naval entry
CCF Navy Cadets	UO	WOCDT			CPOCDT	POCDT	LCDT	A3*CDT	A2*CDT	A1*CDT	NCDT	NNE
CCF Royal Marines Cadets (Part of the CCF RN)												No insignia
CCF Royal Marines Cadets (Part of the CCF RN)	Cadet under officer	Cadet warrant officer first class	Cadet warrant officer second class		Cadet colour sergeant	Cadet sergeant	Cadet corporal		Cadet lance corporal		Cadet	Recruit
CCF Royal Marines Cadets (Part of the CCF RN)	CDTUO	CDTWO1	CDTWO2		CDTCSGT	CDTSGT	CDTCPL		CDTLCPL		CDT	RCT
Sea Cadets Corps												No insignia
Sea Cadets Corps		Petty officer cadet			Leading cadet			Able cadet	Ordinary cadet	Cadet 1st class	Cadet	New entry
Sea Cadets Corps		POC			LC			AC	OC	CFC	CDT	NE
Royal Marines Cadets (Part of the SCC)											No insignia	No insignia
Royal Marines Cadets (Part of the SCC)		Cadet sergeant		Cadet corporal			Cadet lance corporal				Marine cadet	Marine cadet recruit
Royal Marines Cadets (Part of the SCC)		CDT SGT		CDT CPL			CDT LCPL				MC	MCR
Royal Navy Volunteer Cadet Corps												No insignia
Royal Navy Volunteer Cadet Corps		Warrant officer cadet			Chief petty officer cadet	Petty officer cadet	Leading cadet		Able cadet		Naval cadet	New naval entry
Royal Navy Volunteer Cadet Corps		WOCDT			CPOCDT	POCDT	LCDT		ACDT		NCDT	NNE
Royal Marine Volunteer Cadet Corps											No insignia	No insignia
Royal Marine Volunteer Cadet Corps		Cadet warrant officer first class	Cadet warrant officer second class		Cadet colour sergeant	Cadet sergeant	Cadet corporal		Cadet lance corporal		Cadet	Recruit
Royal Marine Volunteer Cadet Corps		CDTWO1	CDTWO2		CDTCSGT	CDTSGT	CDTCPL		CDTLCPL		CDT	RCT
CCF Army Cadets												No insignia
CCF Army Cadets	Cadet under officer	Cadet regimental sergeant major	Cadet regimental quartermaster sergeant	Cadet company sergeant major	Cadet staff/colour sergeant	Cadet sergeant	Cadet corporal		Cadet lance corporal		Cadet	Recruit
CCF Army Cadets	Cdt UO	Cdt RSM	Cdt RQMS	Cdt CSM	Cdt SSgt/Cdt CSgt	Cdt Sgt	Cdt Cpl		Cdt LCpl		Cdt	Rct
Army Cadet Force												
Army Cadet Force	Cadet under officer	Cadet regimental sergeant major	Cadet company sergeant major		Cadet staff sergeant	Cadet sergeant	Cadet corporal		Cadet lance corporal		Cadet	Recruit
Army Cadet Force	Cdt UO	Cdt RSM	Cdt CSM		Cdt SSgt	Cdt Sgt	Cdt Cpl		Cdt LCpl		Cdt	Rct
Cayman Islands Cadet Corps												No insignia
Cayman Islands Cadet Corps	Cadet under officer		Cadet company sergeant major		Cadet staff sergeant	Cadet sergeant	Cadet corporal		Cadet lance corporal		Cadet	Recruit
Cayman Islands Cadet Corps	CDTUO		CDTCSM		CDTSSGT	CDTSGT	CDTCPL		CDTLCPL		CDT	RCT
CCF RAF Cadets											No insignia	
CCF RAF Cadets	Cadet under officer (former rank, no longer in use)	Cadet warrant officer			Cadet flight sergeant	Cadet sergeant	Cadet corporal		Cadet lance corporal		Cadet	
CCF RAF Cadets	CUO	CWO			Cdt FS	Cdt Sgt	Cdt Cpl		Cdt LCpl		Cdt	
Air Training Corps											No insignia	
Air Training Corps		Cadet warrant officer			Cadet flight sergeant	Cadet sergeant	Cadet corporal				Cadet	
Air Training Corps		CWO			Cdt FS	Cdt Sgt	Cdt Cpl				Cdt	

=== Junior cadets ===
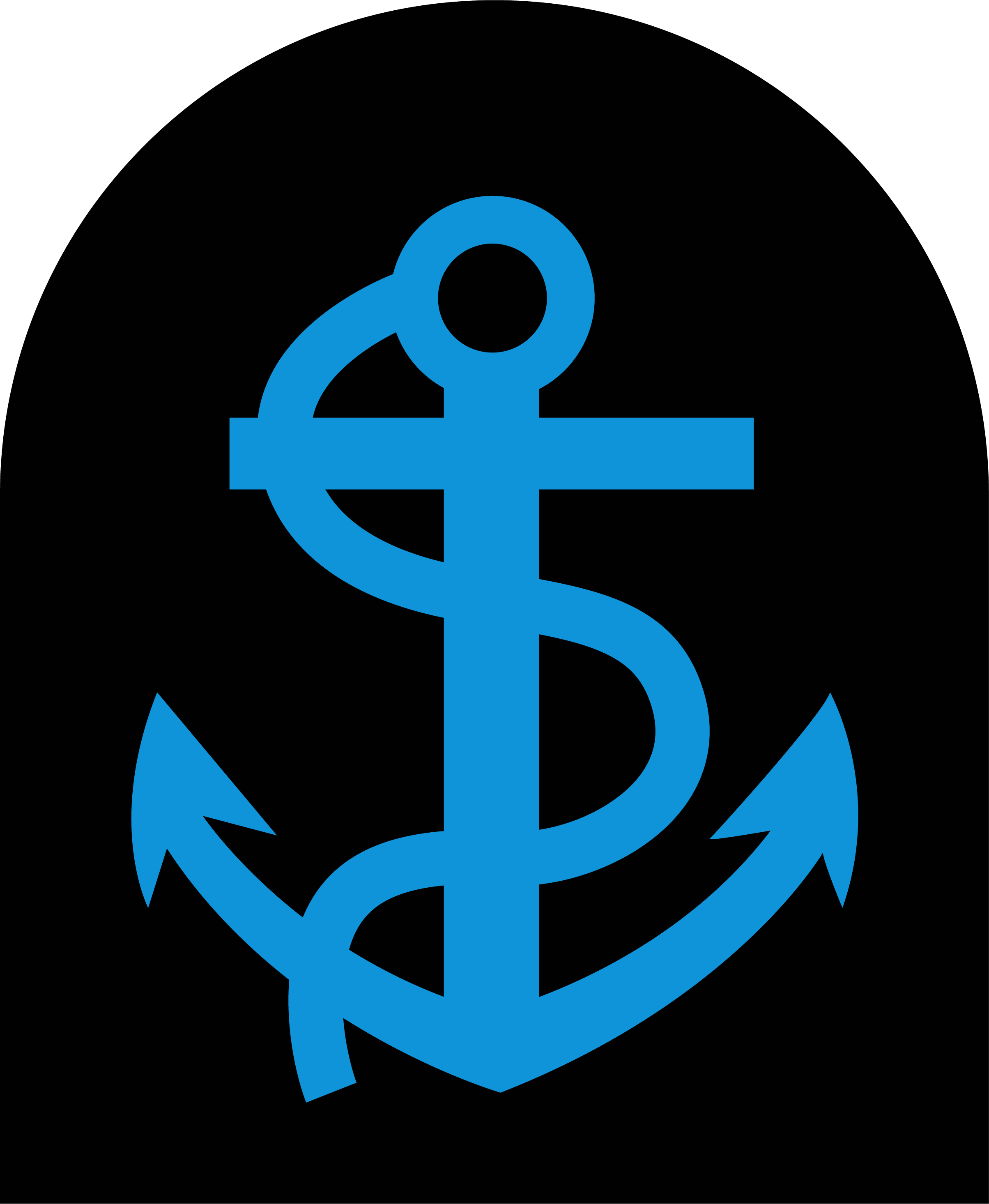
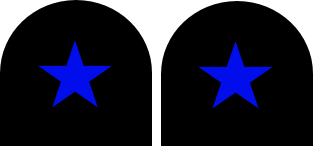
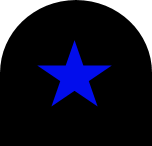
Junior Sea Cadets Corps
Junior Sea Cadets Corps	Leading junior cadet	Able junior cadet	Junior cadet first class	Junior cadet
Junior Sea Cadets Corps	LJC	AJC	JCFC	JC

== Cadet force adult volunteer ranks ==
=== NCOs / senior ratings ===
From 2009 to 2019, if a person joined as a civilian instructor in the Sea Cadets or Royal Marine Cadets and wanted to be a uniformed member of staff, they would become an acting petty officer or sergeant, following a six-month probationary period.

In 2018 the role of sergeant instructor (SI) was introduced for CCF(Army) sections, this is the first occasion that adults other than SSIs have been appointed as an NCO rather than a commissioned rank in the CCF.

Army	ACF								
Army	CCF								
Army	Title	Warrant officer class 1	Regimental quartermaster sergeant instructor	Warrant officer class 2	Staff/colour sergeant	Sergeant	Probationary sergeant	Probationary instructor	Civilian assistant
Army	Abbr.	WO1 (ACF/CCF)	WO2 (CCF)	WO2 (ACF/CCF)	SSgt/CSgt (ACF)	Sgt (ACF/CCF)	PSgt (ACF)	PI (ACF/CCF)	CA
ATC/CCF (RAF)	Groundcrew							No insignia	
ATC/CCF (RAF)	Aircrew							No insignia	
ATC/CCF (RAF)	Title	Warrant officer/master aircrew			Flight sergeant	Sergeant	Acting sergeant	Civilian instructor/ civilian gliding instructor	
ATC/CCF (RAF)	Abbr.	WO RAFAC/MAcr RAFAC			FS RAFAC	Sgt RAFAC	A/Sgt RAFAC	CI/CGI	
SCC									
SCC	Title	Warrant officer class 1 RNR (Note: One per Sea Cadet Corps Area.)		Warrant officer class 2	Chief petty officer	Petty officer	Probationary petty officer	Civilian instructor	Unit assistant
SCC	Abbr.	WO1 (SCC) RNR		WO2 (SCC) RNR	CPO (SCC)	PO (SCC)	P/PO (SCC)	CI	UA
RMC/CCF (RM)								No insignia	
RMC/CCF (RM)	Title	Warrant officer class 1 RMR (Note: Promoted to this rank upon taking up the role as regimental sergeant major (one in the Sea Cadets).)		Warrant officer class 2 RMR	Colour sergeant	Sergeant	Probationary sergeant	Civilian instructor	
RMC/CCF (RM)	Abbr.	WO1 (SCC) RMR		WO2 (SCC) RMR	CSgt (SCC)	Sgt (SCC)	P/Sgt (SCC)	CI	
CCF (RN)									
CCF (RN)	Title				Chief petty officer (school staff instructor)				
CCF (RN)	Abbr.				CPO (SSI)				
GVCAC								No insignia	
GVCAC	Title							Civilian instructor	
GVCAC	Abbr.							CI	

=== Officers ===
Formerly, officers in MOD-recognised cadet organisations (SCC, CCF, ACF, VCC) held a highest substantive rank of lieutenant, with more senior ranks being acting ranks.

Since 2017, all cadet officers are now commissioned under a bespoke cadet forces commission (CFC), with all appointments now being substantive. All previous Royal Air Force Volunteer Reserve (Training Branch) (RAFVR(T)) officers of the ATC and CCF RAF had their commissions transferred to the new CFC in 2017.

Army	ACF							
Army	CCF							
Army	Title	Colonel	Lieutenant colonel	Major	Captain	Lieutenant	2nd lieutenant	Adult under officer
Army	Abbr.	Col	Lt Col	Maj	Capt	Lt	2Lt	AUO
ATC/CCF (RAF)								
ATC/CCF (RAF)	Title	Group Captain (Note: Group captain is usually held by FTRS officers in regional commandant or HQAC posts. There is currently only one CFAV in the rank, the senior volunteer advisor at HQ Air Cadets.)	Wing commander	Squadron leader	Flight lieutenant	Flying officer	Pilot officer	Acting pilot officer
ATC/CCF (RAF)	Abbr.	Gp Capt	Wg Cdr	Sqn Ldr	Flt Lt	Fg Off	Plt Off	APO
CCF (RN) and SCC								
CCF (RN) and SCC	SCC title	Captain (SCC) RNR (Note: Volunteer rank does not exist with the Sea Cadet Corps.)	Commander (SCC) RNR	Lieutenant commander (SCC) RNR	Lieutenant (SCC) RNR	Sub lieutenant (SCC) RNR	Midshipman (SCC) RNR	
CCF (RN) and SCC	CCF title		Commander (CCF) RNR	Lieutenant commander (CCF) RNR	Lieutenant (CCF) RNR	Sub lieutenant (CCF) RNR		
CCF (RN) and SCC	Abbr.	Capt	Cdr	Lt Cdr	Lt	SLt	Mid	
RMC/CCF (RM)								
RMC/CCF (RM)	RMC title		Lieutenant colonel (CCF) RMR	Major (CCF) RMR	Captain (CCF) RMR	Lieutenant (CCF) RMR	2nd lieutenant (CCF) RMR	
RMC/CCF (RM)	Abbr.		Lt Col	Maj	Capt	Lt	2Lt	

== Former cadet organisations ==
Cadet ranks and insignia of former cadet organisations
Air Defence Cadet Corps		1939-1941 1941							
Air Defence Cadet Corps		Cadet warrant officer	Cadet flight sergeant	Cadet sergeant	Cadet corporal	Cadet lance corporal		Cadet	
Air Defence Cadet Corps		CDTWO	CDTFSGT	CDTSGT	CDTCPL	CDTLCPL		CDT	
Women's Junior Air Corps									
Women's Junior Air Corps			Cadet unit sergeant	Cadet sergeant	Cadet corporal	Cadet lance corporal		Cadet	
Women's Junior Air Corps			CDTUSGT	CDTSGT	CDTCPL	CDTLCPL		CDT	
Girls Venture Corps Air Cadets									
Girls Venture Corps Air Cadets	Officer cadet		Cadet unit sergeant	Cadet sergeant	Cadet corporal	Cadet lance corporal	Leading cadet	Cadet	Recruit
Girls Venture Corps Air Cadets	OFFCDT		CDTUSGT	CDTSGT	CDTCPL	CDTLC	LCDT	CDT	RCT

=== Welbeck DSFC ===
Epaulettes were worn by students whilst in the college kit, G-Kit, MTP and service uniform. It denoted their academic year and the seniority/position of authority that they held within the college. The college closed in July 2021.

Ranks and insignia of Welbeck DSFC

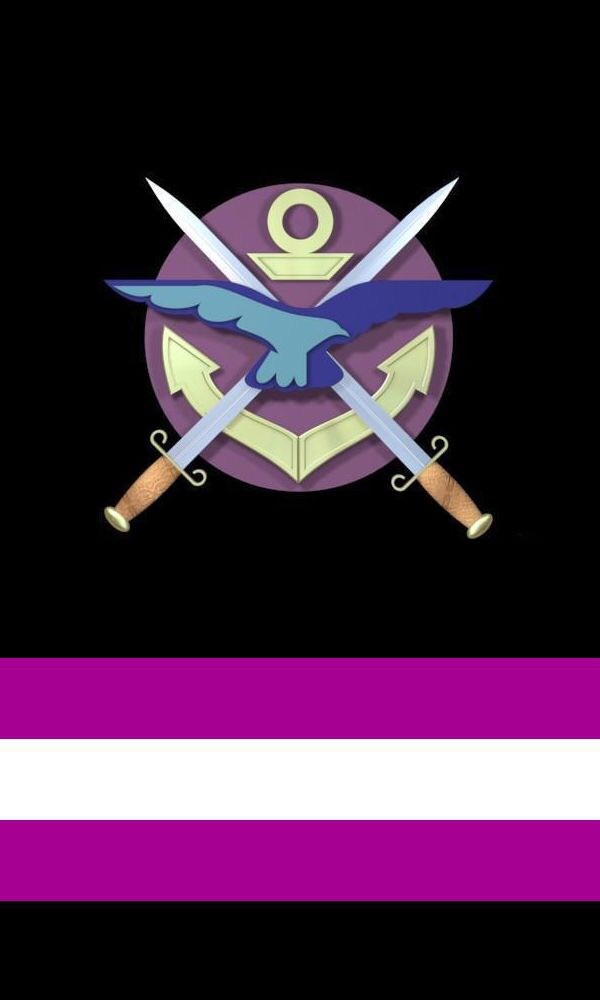
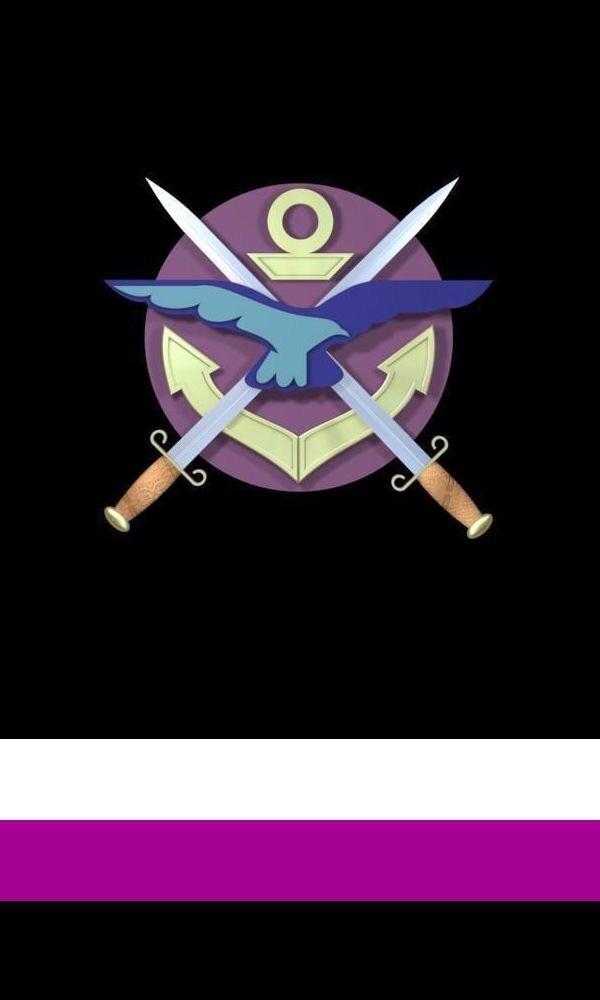
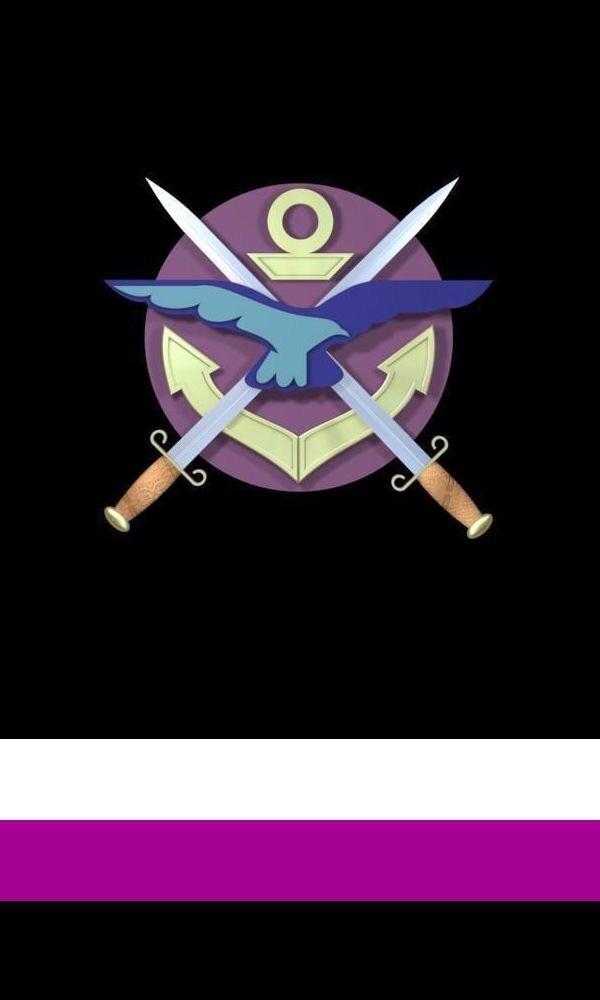
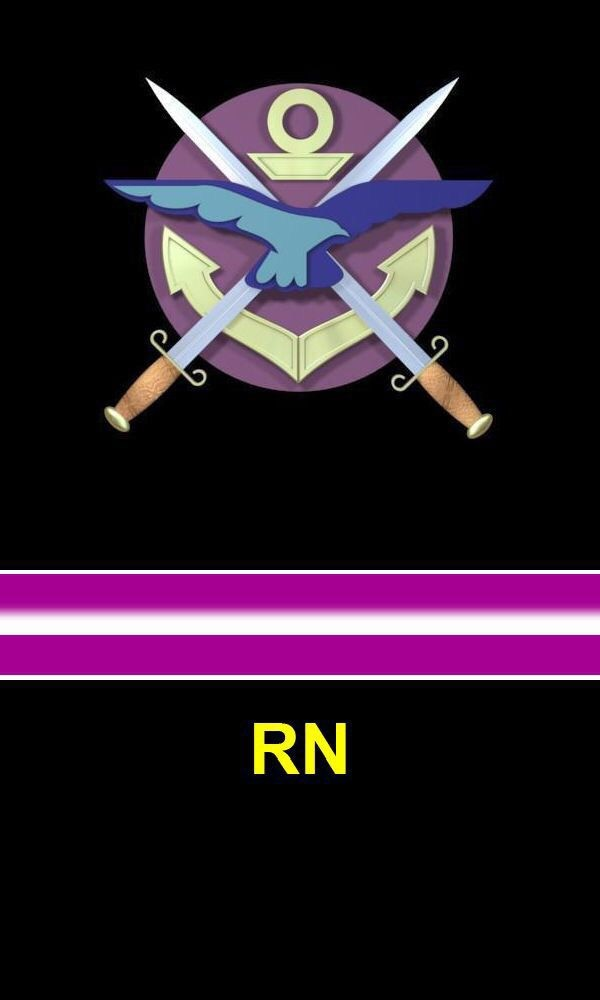
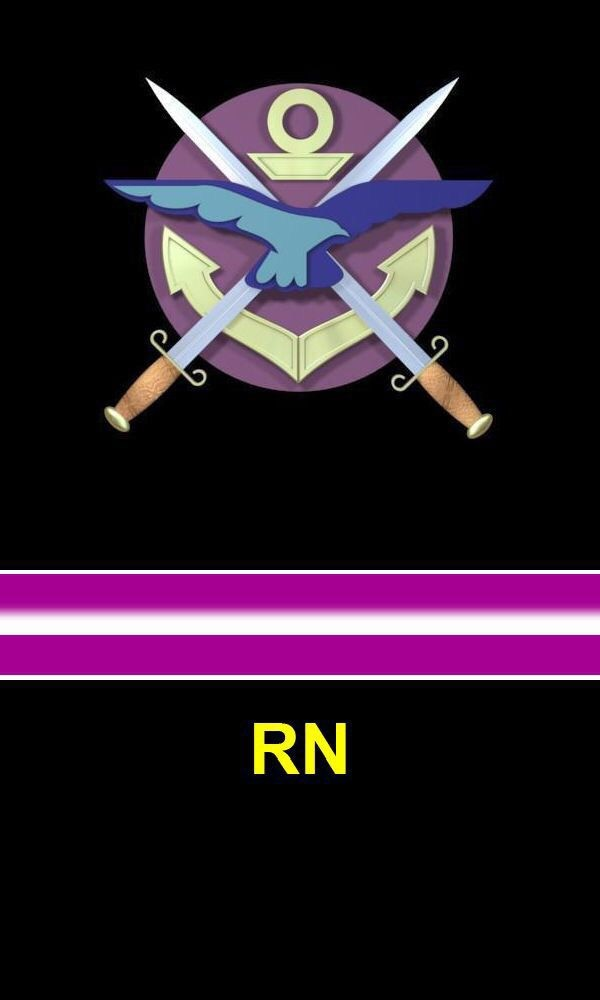
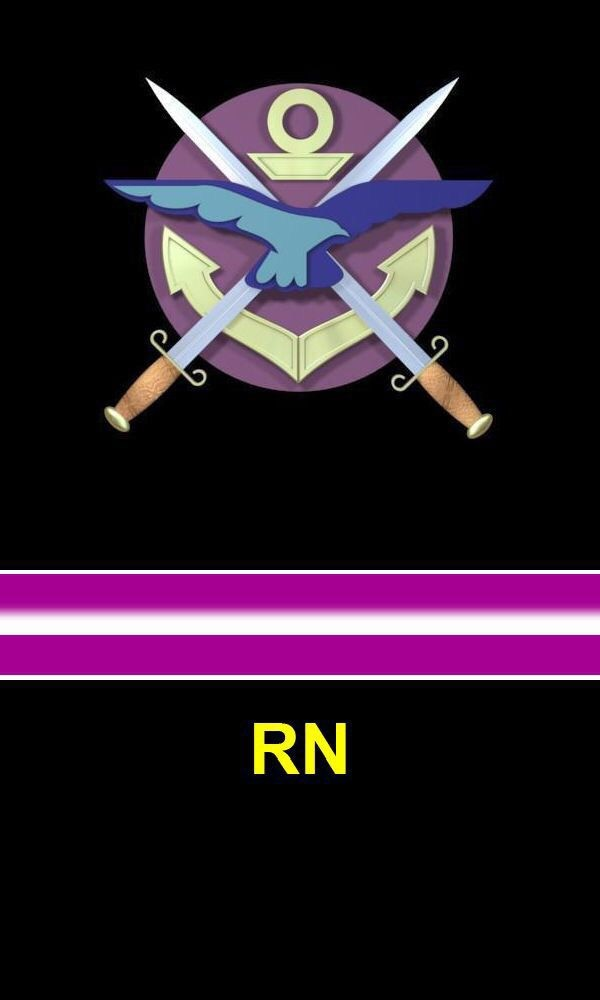
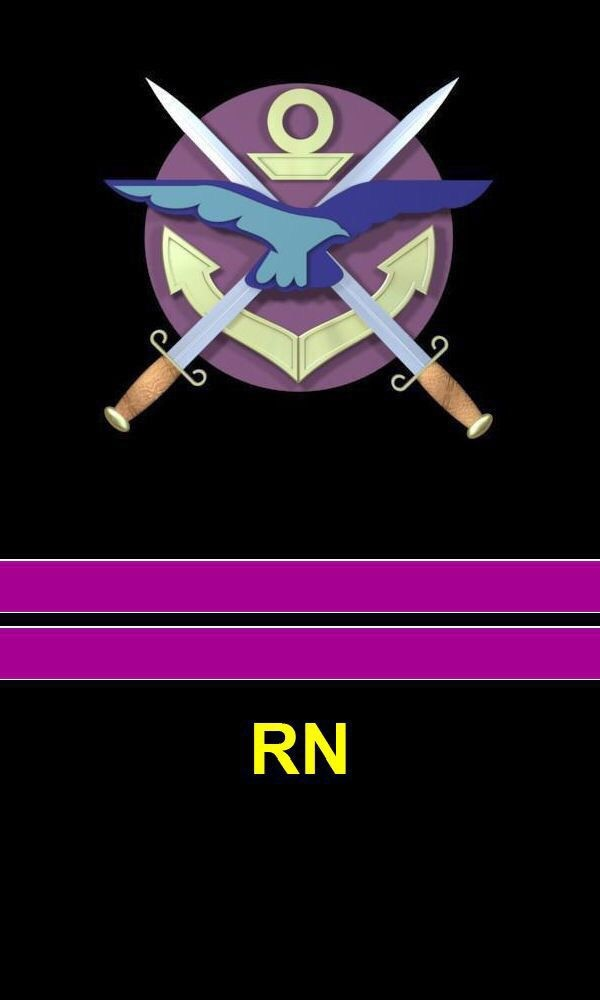
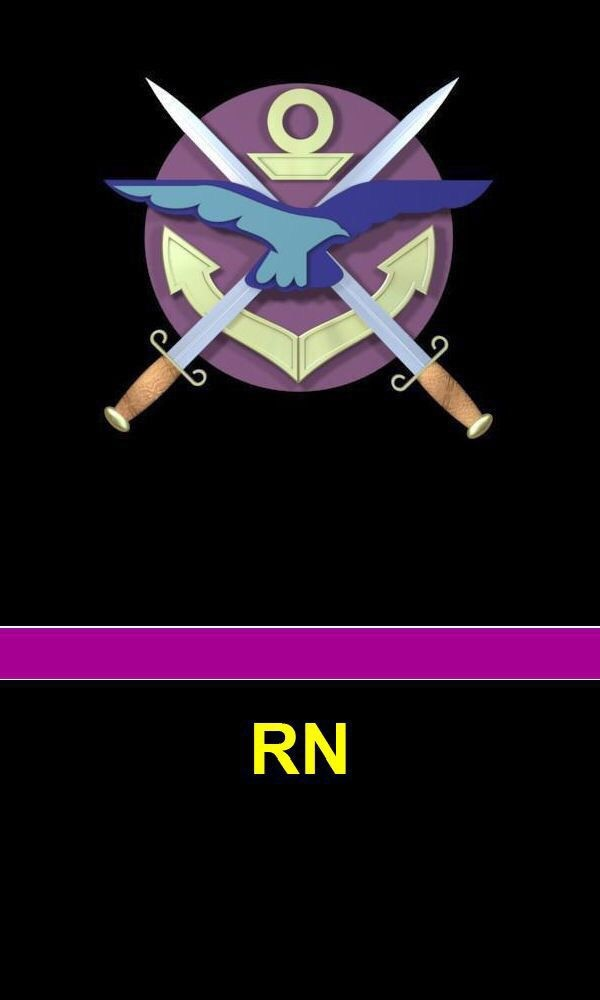
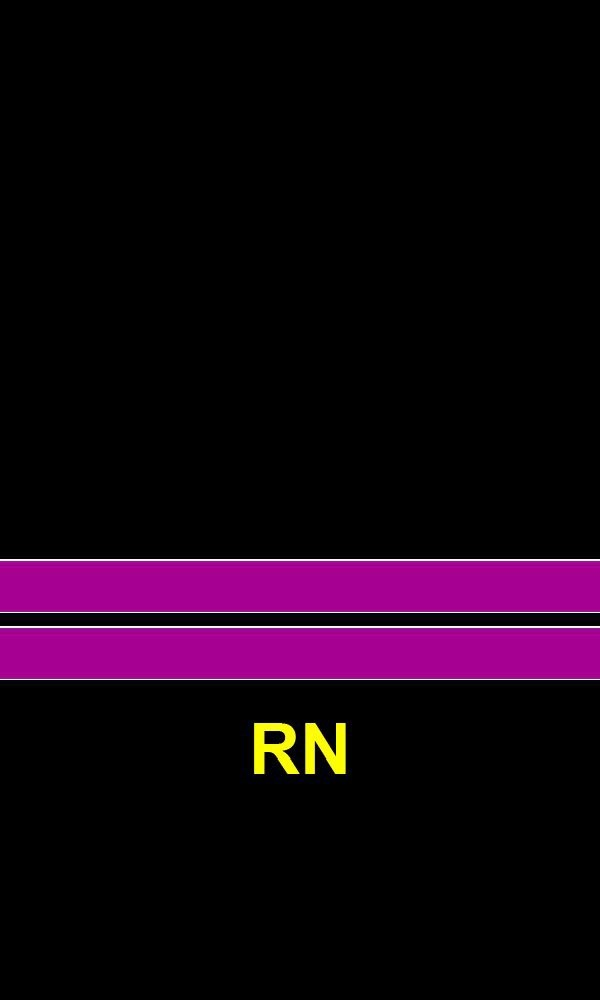
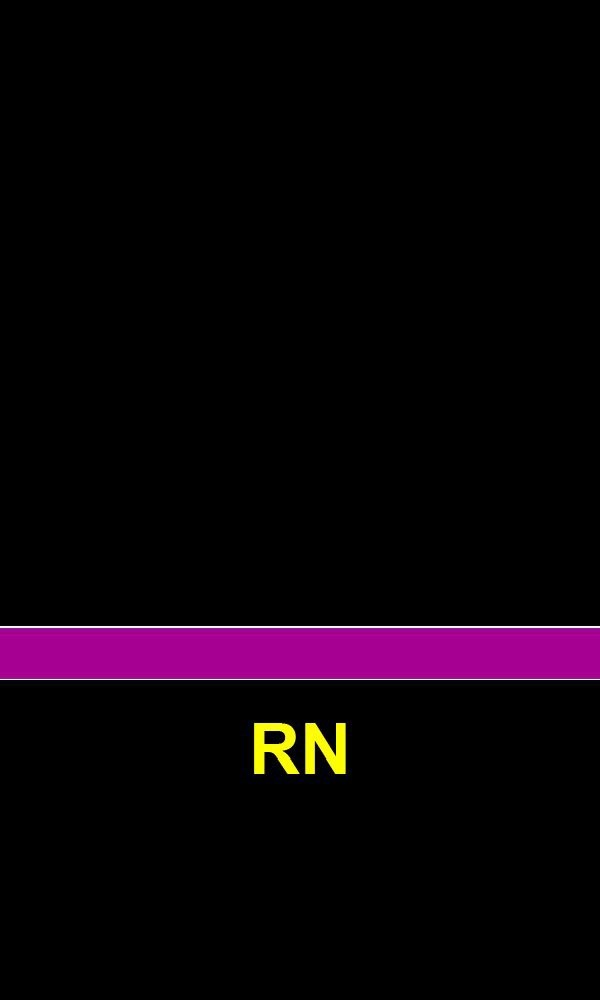
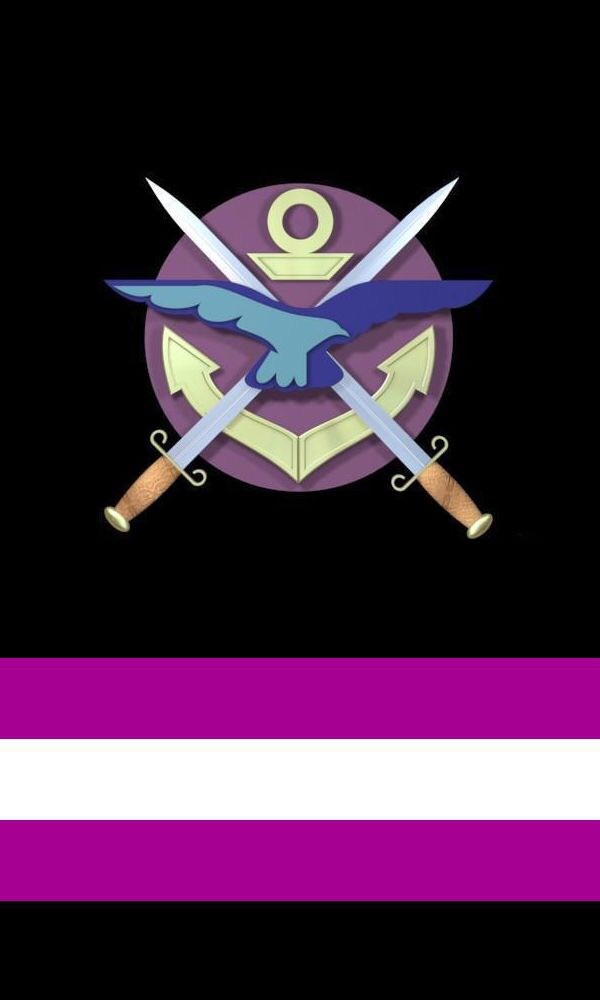
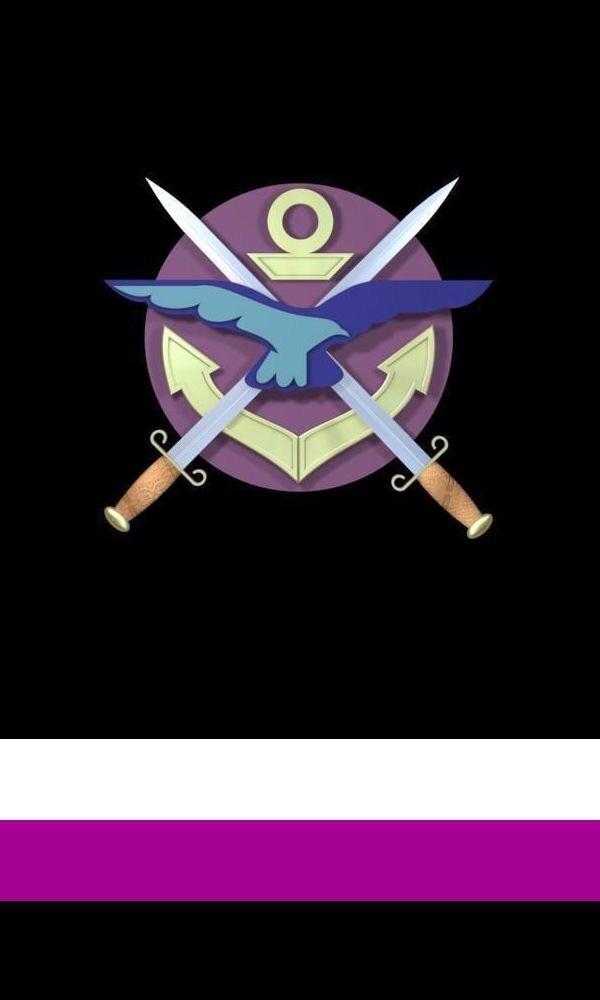
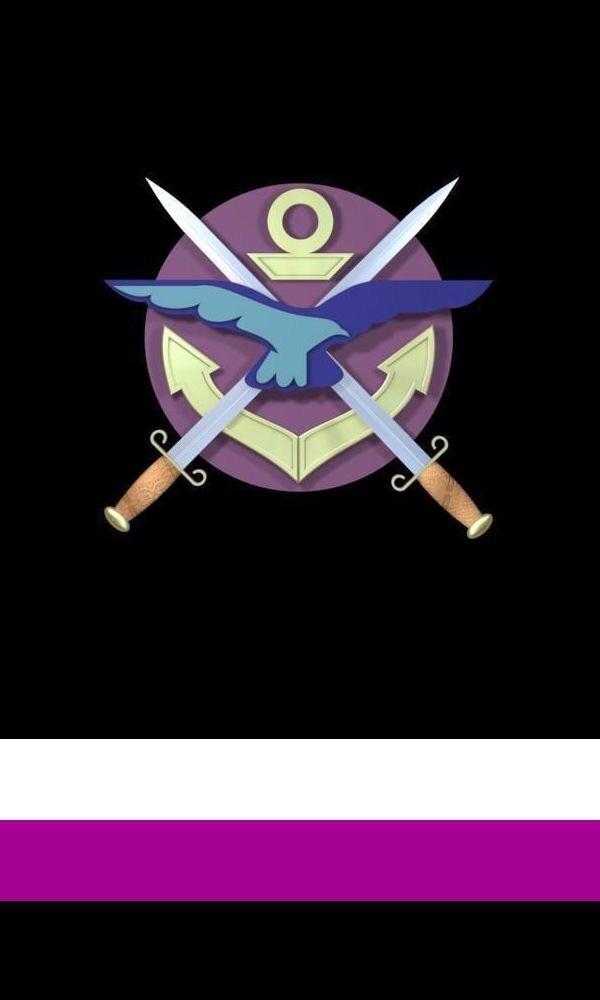
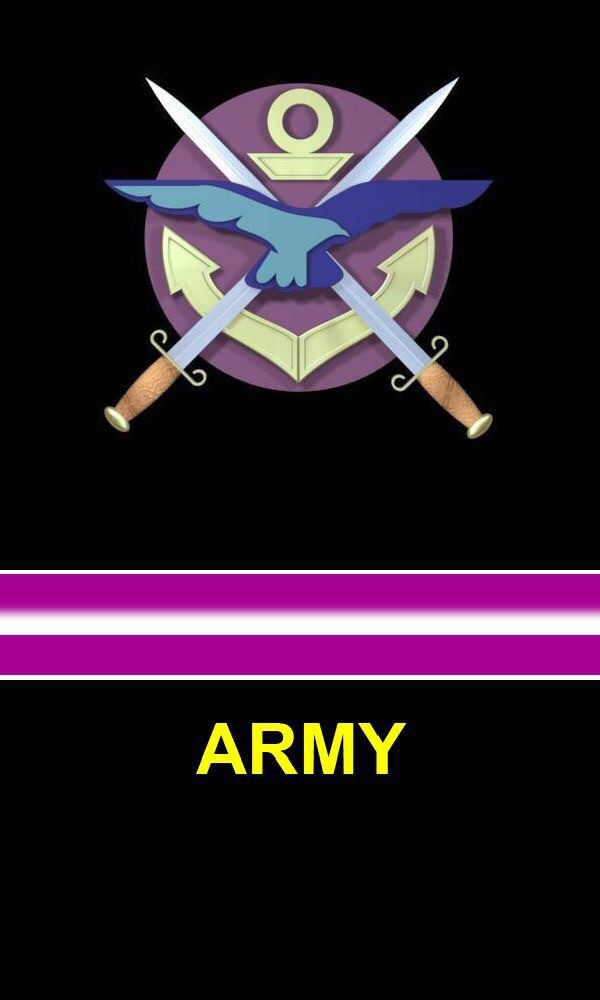
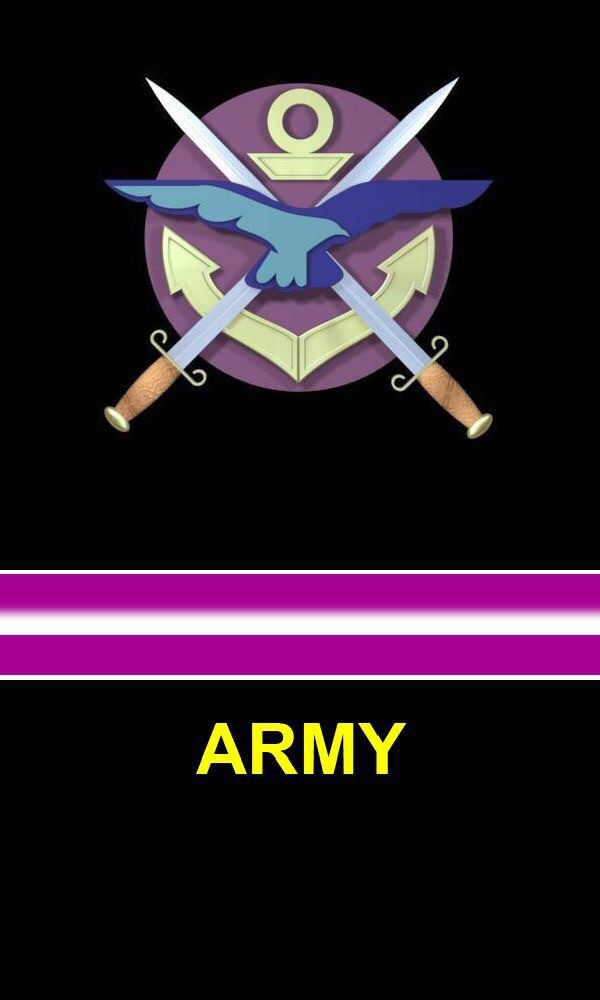
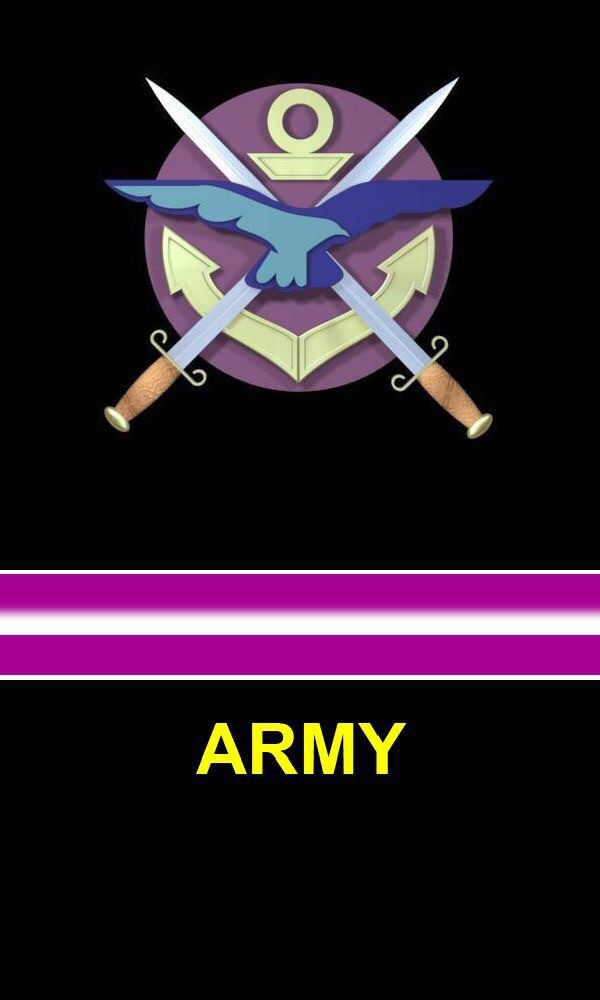
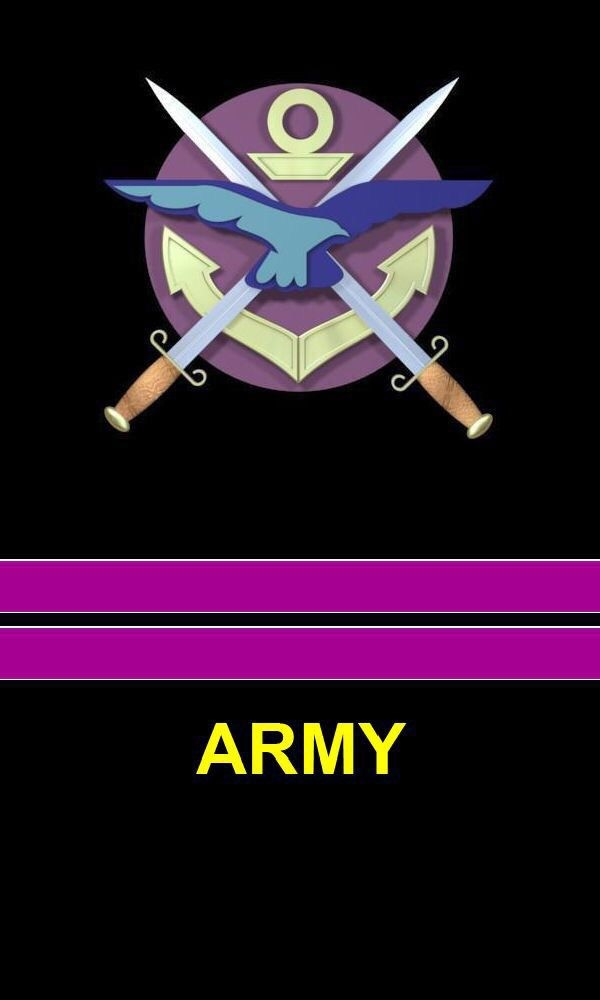
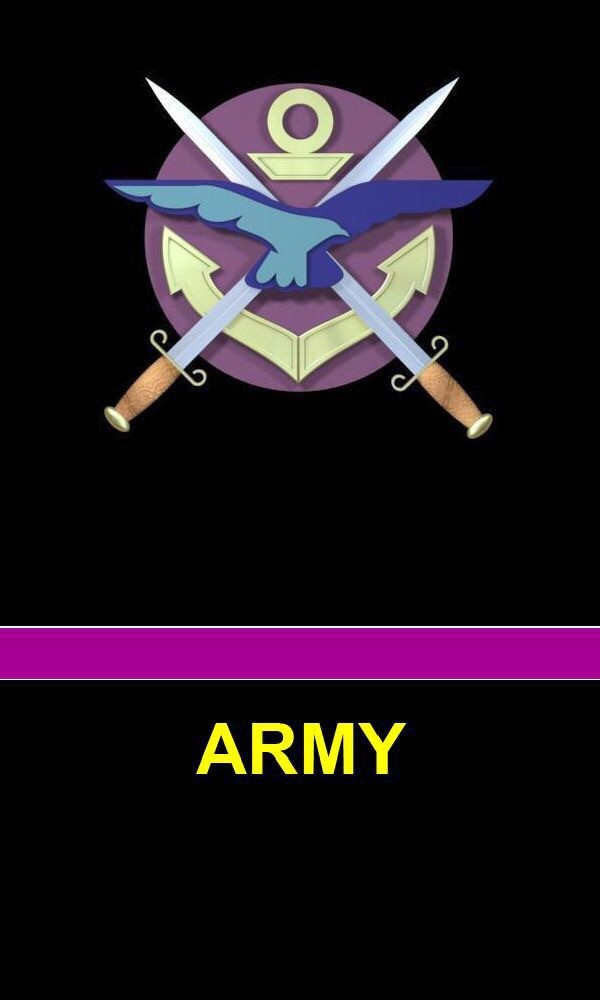
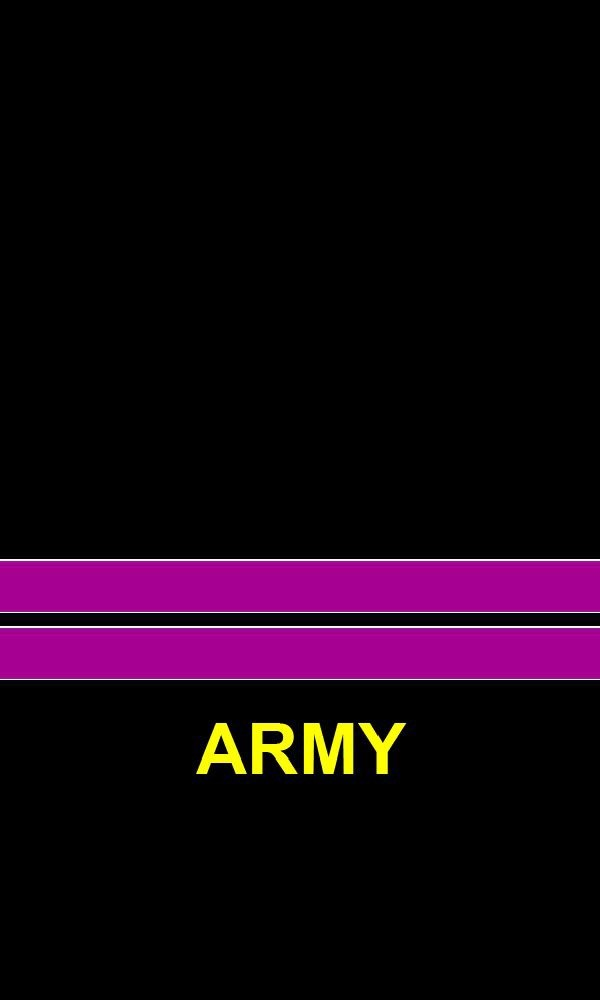
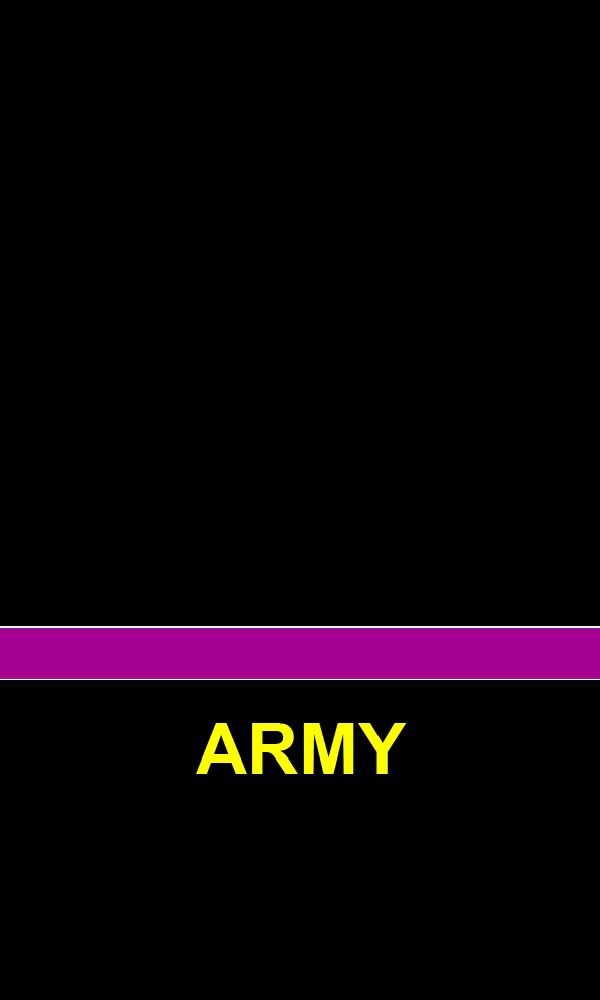
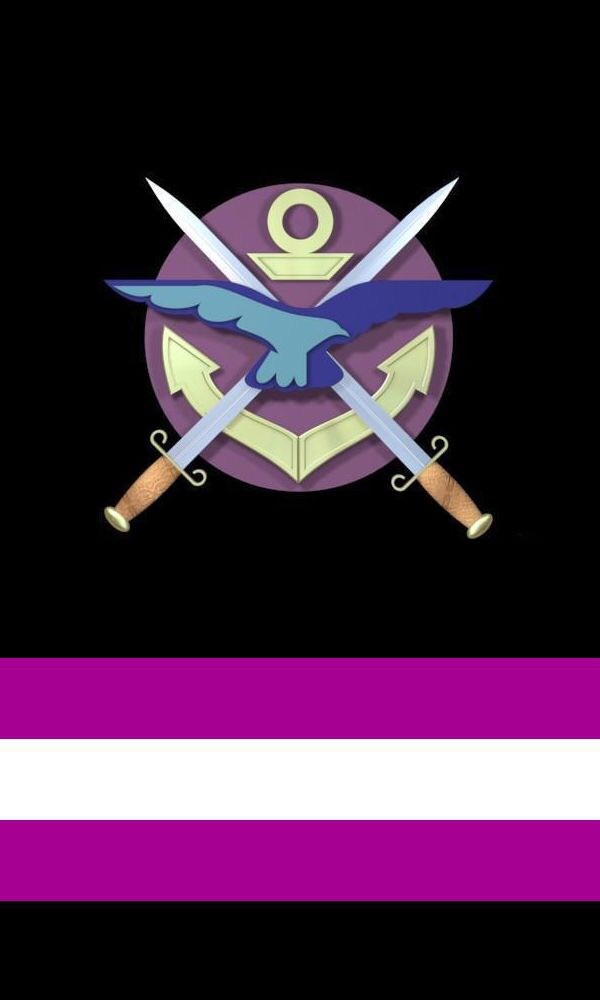
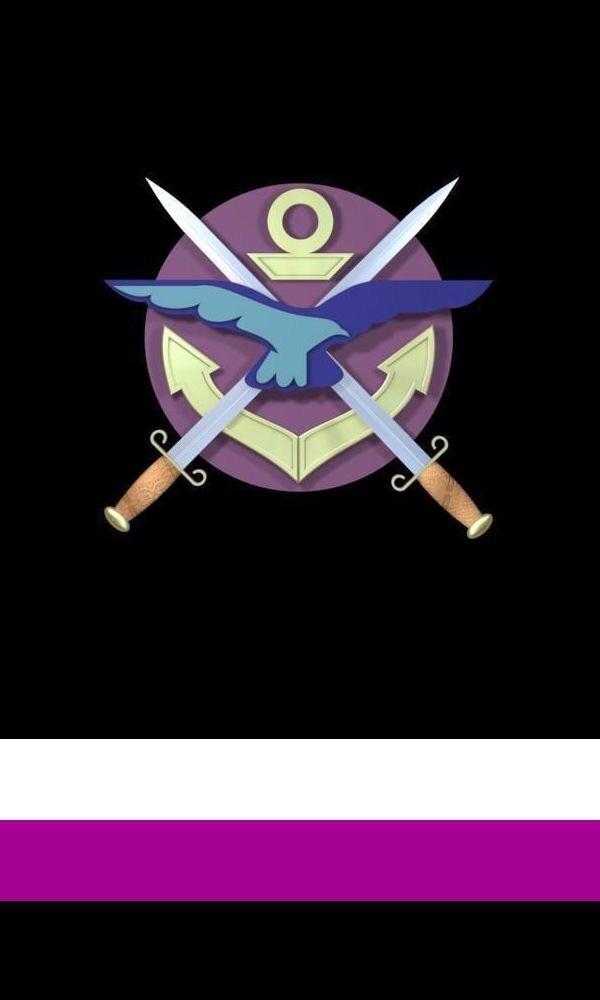
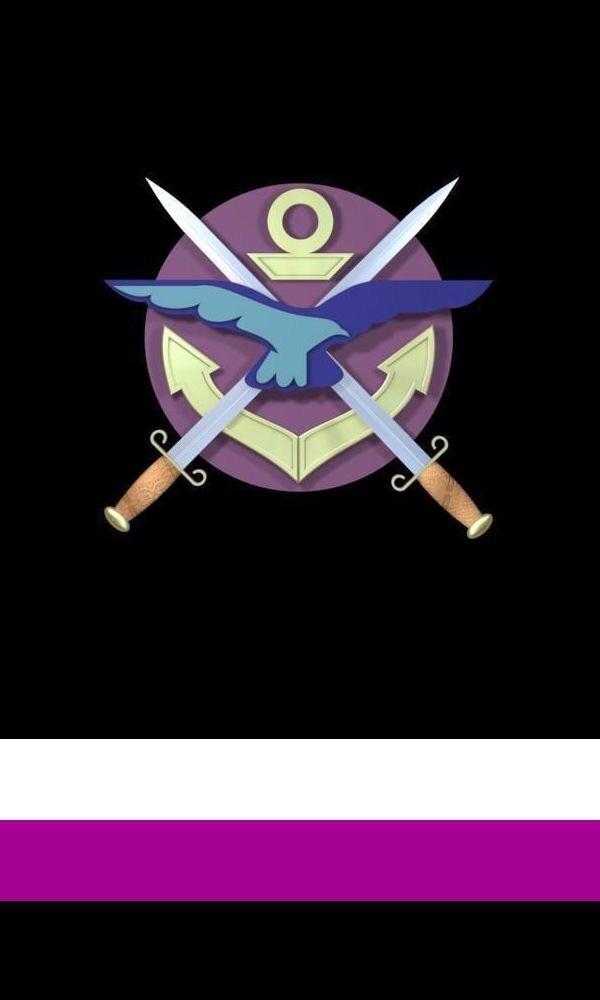
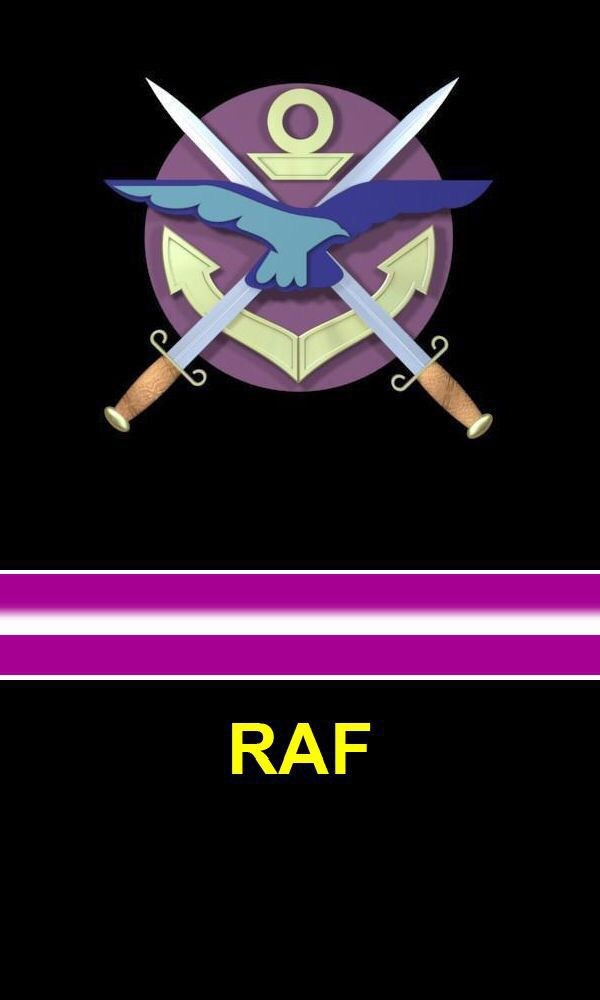
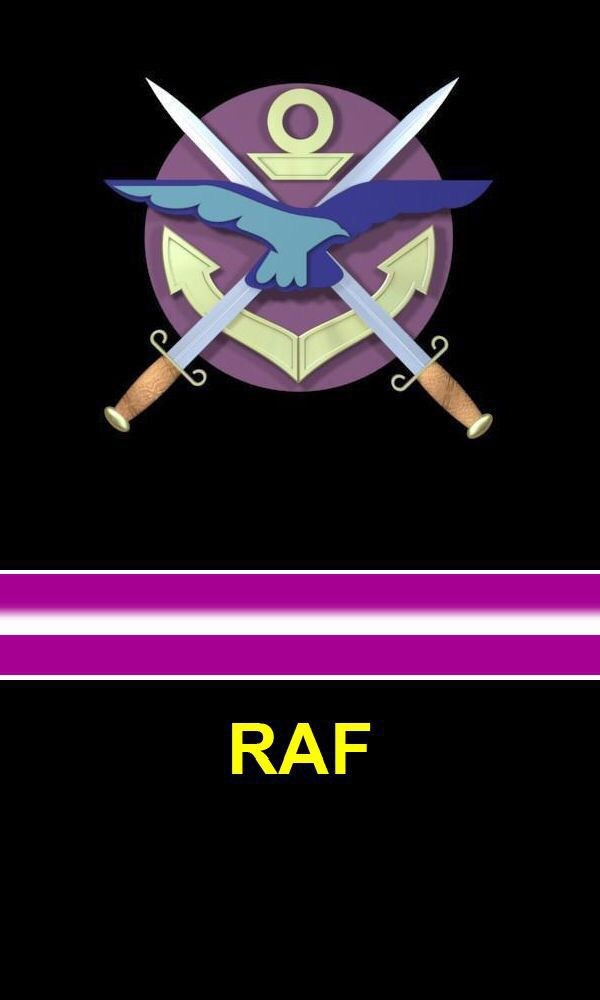
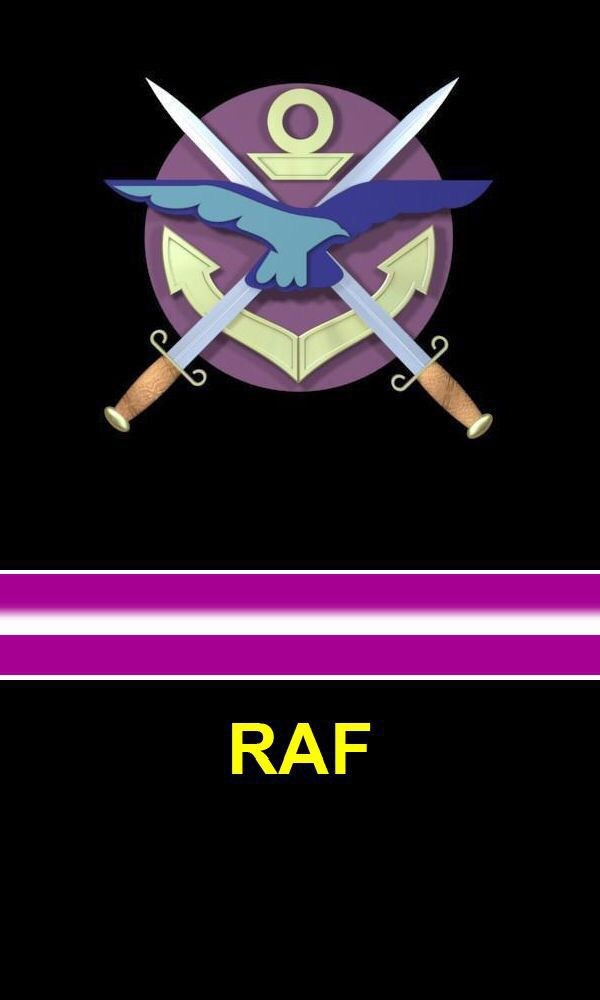
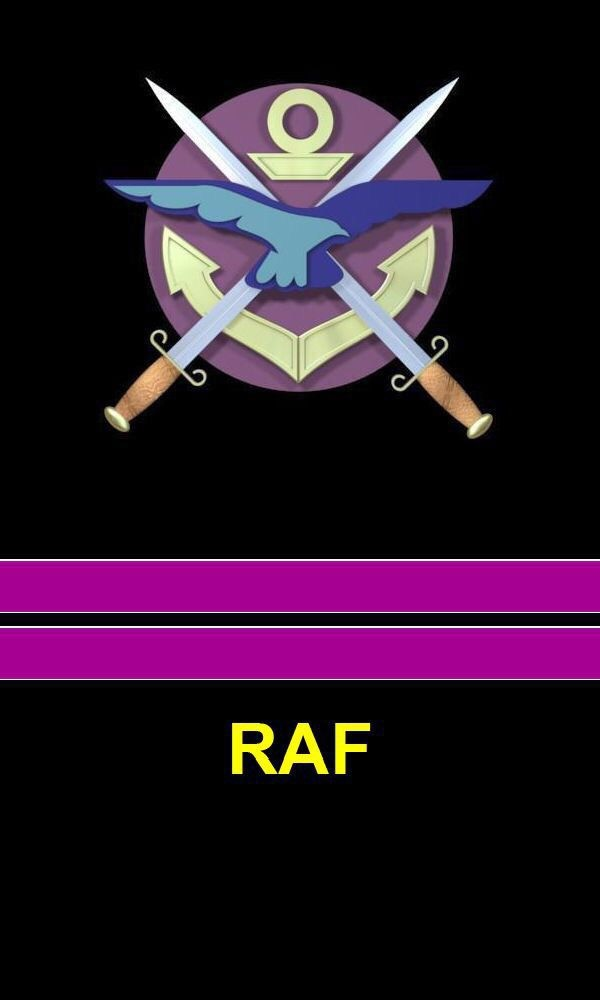
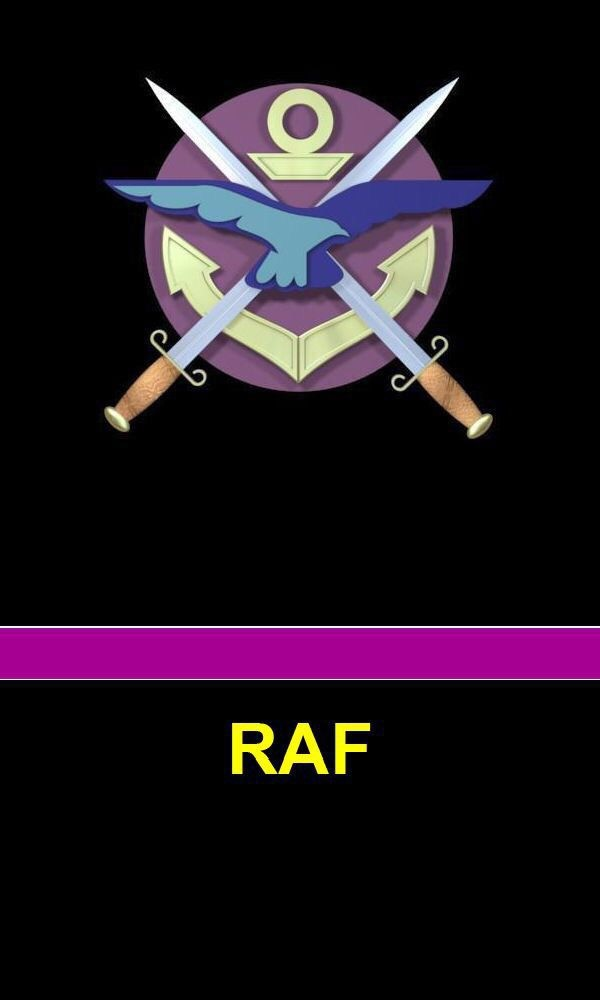
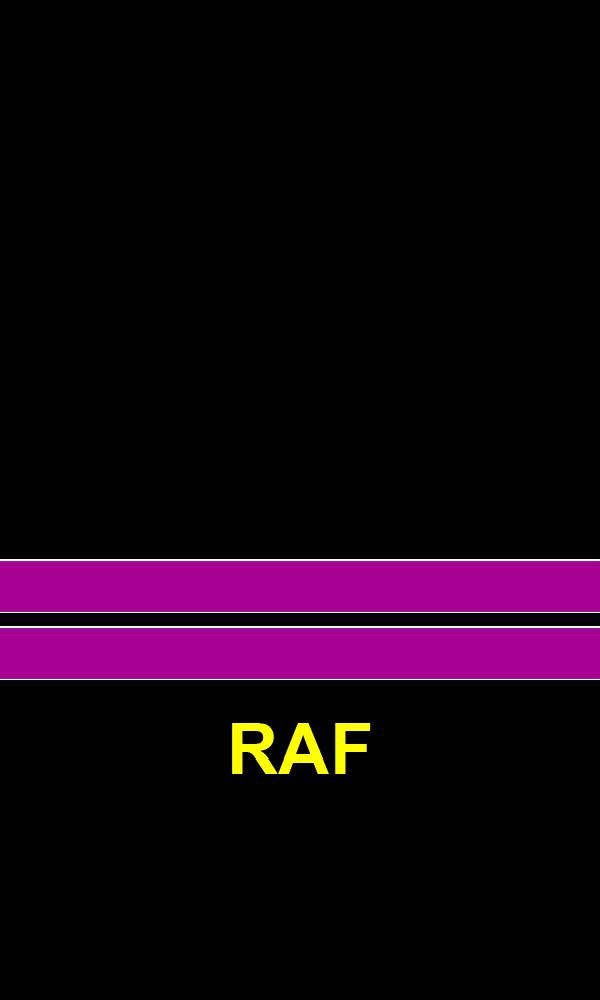
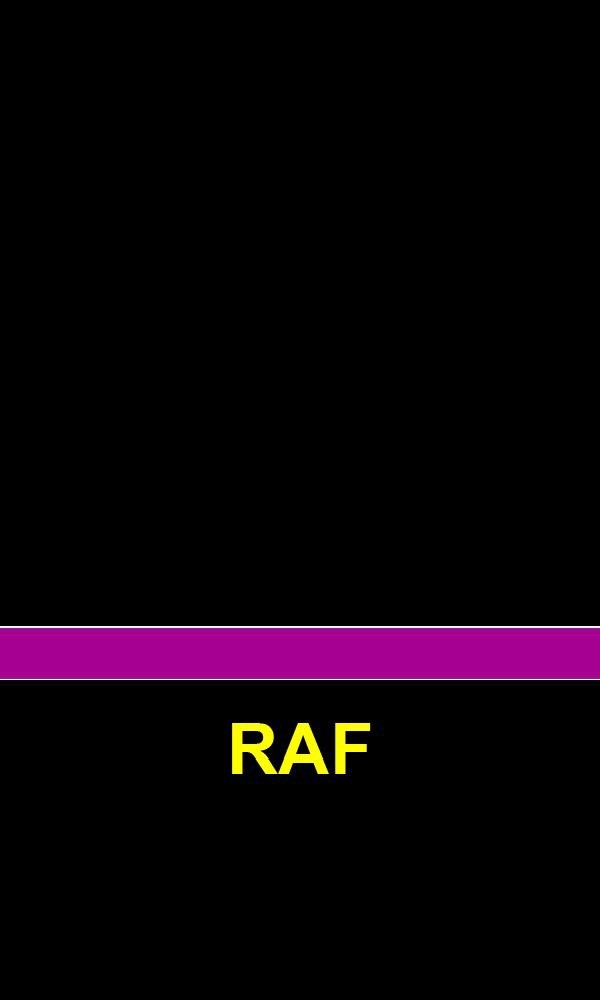
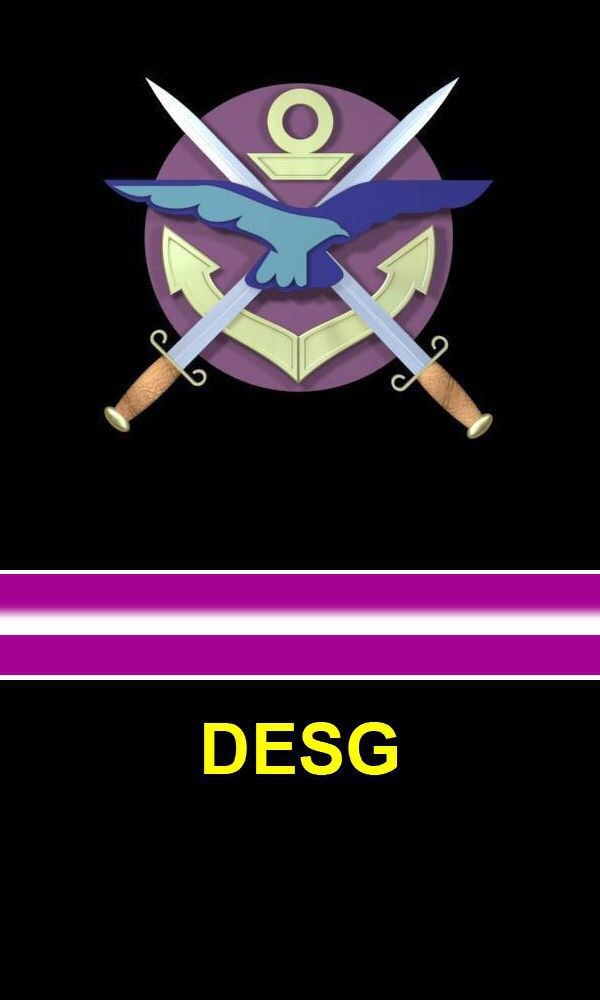
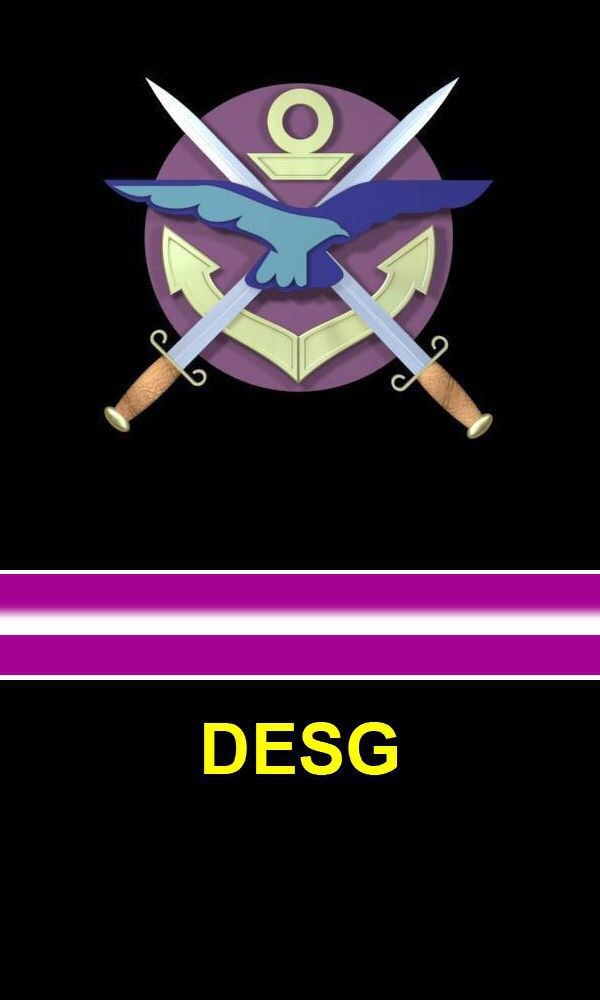
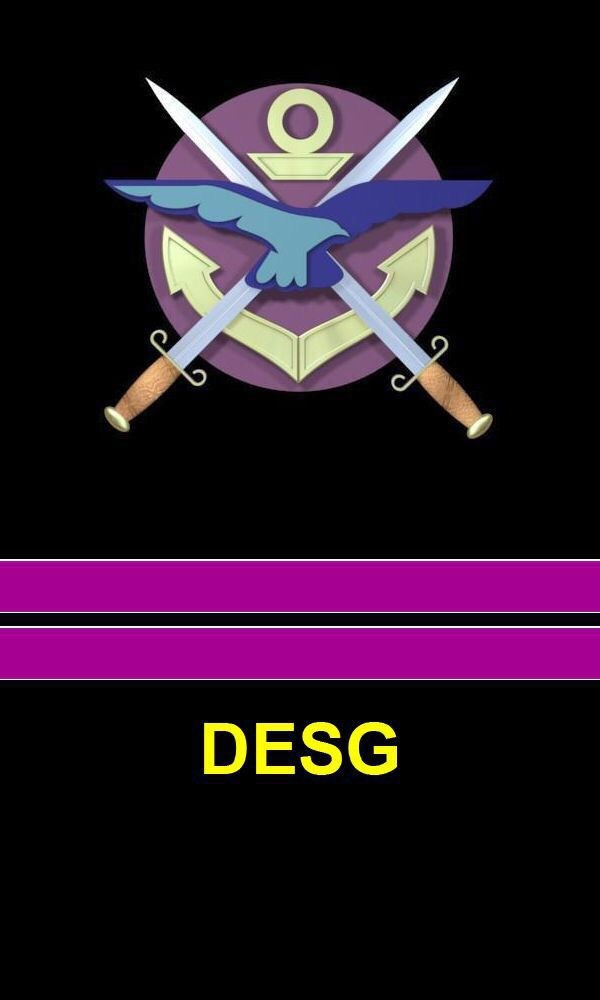
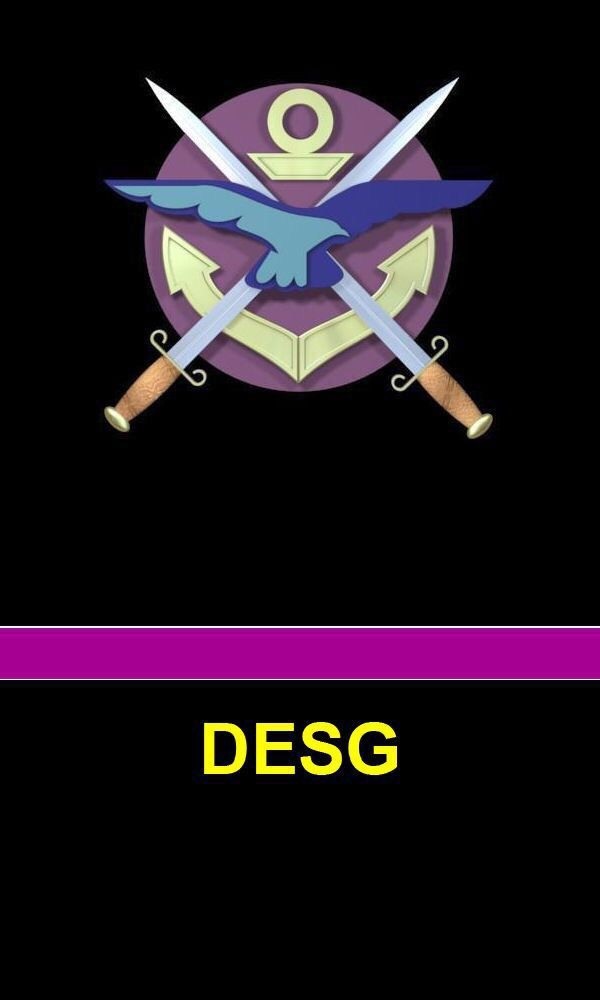
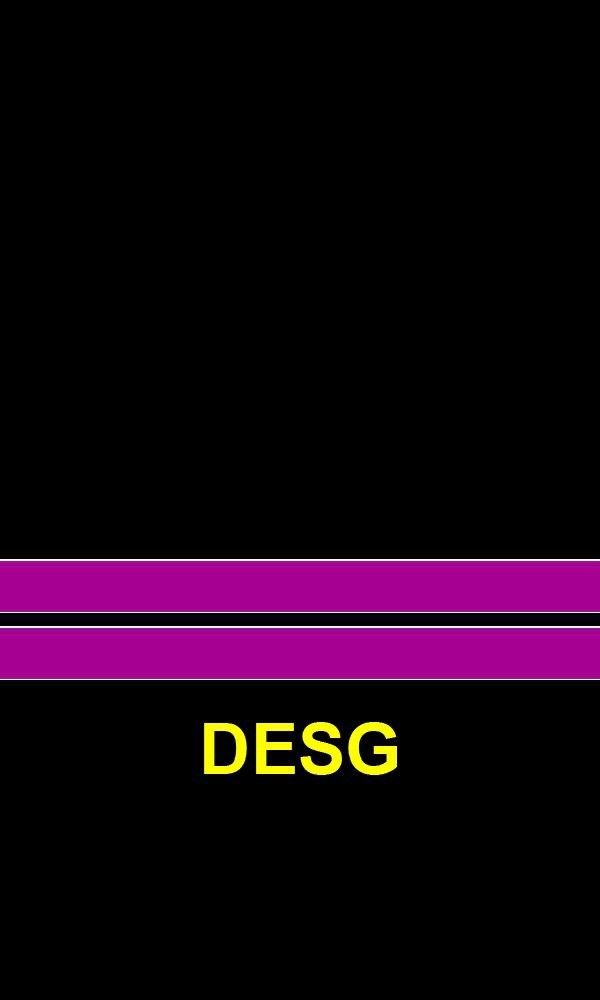
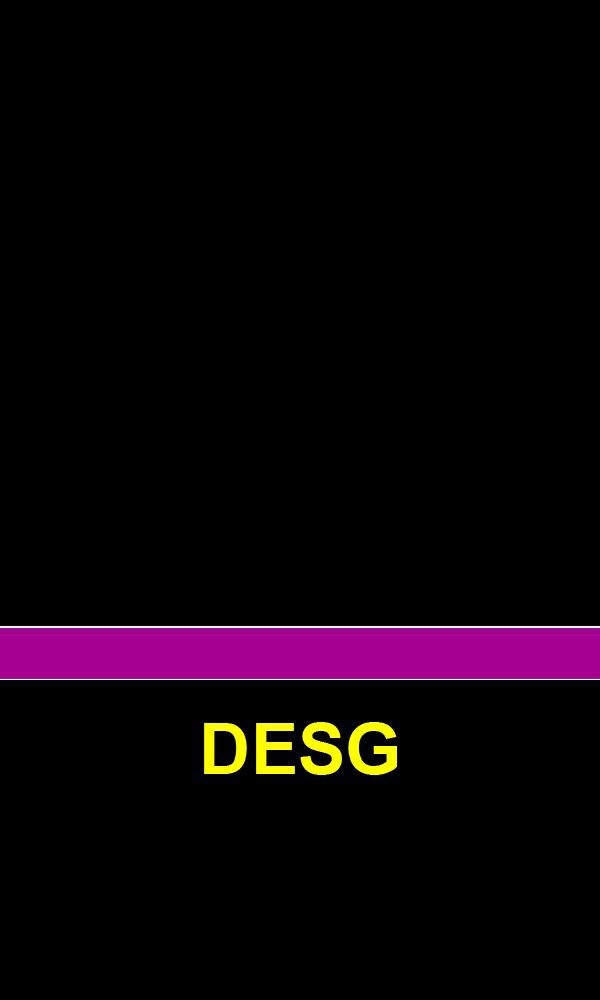
Welbeck DSFC CCF	Senior college prefect			College prefect	House prefect		Student
Royal Navy students
British Army students
Royal Air Force students
Title	Officer cadet	Officer cadet	Officer cadet	Officer cadet	Officer cadet	Officer cadet	Officer cadet	Officer cadet	Officer cadet	Officer cadet
Title	Head of college	Vice head of college	Deputy heads of college	Head of house	Deputy head of house	House prefect	Upper sixth student (with college award)	Lower sixth student (with college award)	Upper sixth student	Lower sixth student
Title	OCdt HoC	OCdt VHoC	OCdt DHoC	OCdt HoH	OCdt DHoH	OCdt HP	OCdt U6CA	OCdt L6CA	OCdt U6	OCdt L6
Defence Engineering and Science Group students	no equivalent
Defence Engineering and Science Group students	no equivalent				Officer cadet	Officer cadet	Officer cadet	Officer cadet	Officer cadet	Officer cadet
Defence Engineering and Science Group students	no equivalent				Deputy head of house	House prefect	Upper sixth student (with college award)	Lower sixth student (with college award)	Upper sixth student	Lower sixth student
Defence Engineering and Science Group students	no equivalent				OCdt DHoH	OCdt HP	OCdt U6CA	OCdt L6CA	OCdt U6	OCdt L6
Welbeck DSFC CCF	Senior college prefect			College prefect	House prefect		Student

== See also ==
=== Cadet forces ===
- Combined Cadet Force
- Community Cadet Forces
  - Air Training Corps
  - Army Cadet Force
  - Sea Cadet Corps
  - Royal Marines Cadets
- Volunteer Cadet Corps
  - Royal Marines Volunteer Cadet Corps

=== International cadet ranks ===
- Ranks of the Junior Reserve Officers' Training Corps
- Cadet grades and insignia of the Civil Air Patrol
- Cadets Canada Elemental Ranks
- New Zealand Cadet Forces ranks
- Australian Defence Force Cadets ranks
- Royal Belgian Sea Cadet Corps ranks

=== Ranks of the British Armed Forces ===
- Royal Navy ratings rank insignia
- Royal Navy officer rank insignia
- British Army other ranks rank insignia
- British Army officer rank insignia
- RAF other ranks
- RAF officer ranks

== Sources ==
- Army Cadet Force Regulations (PDF). November 2022. Archived from the original (PDF) on 18 July 2024.
