= Australian Defence Force Cadets =

- The Badge of the ADFC
- Active: 1976 – present
- Role: Youth development organisation
- Headquarters: Russell Offices

Commanders
- Head Cadet, Reserve and Employer Support Divisions: Rear Admiral Brett Wolski, AM, RAN
- Australian Defence Force Cadets Patron: General Sir Peter Cosgrove, AK, CVO, MC

The Australian Defence Force Cadets (ADFC) (also known as the Australian Service Cadet Scheme until 2001) consists of three Australian Defence Force affiliated, community-based, youth development organisations of approximately 30,000 cadets and 4,405 staff members in 579 units across Australia. Coordination of the Australian Defence Force Cadets is via the ADF HQ unit called Reserve and Youth Division, with Commander ADF Cadets - directly accountable to VCDF. The ADFC is funded by the Australian Government through the Department of Defence, in partnership with the community.

The Australian Defence Force Cadets have been a large part of the Australian community since the 19th century. After the cadets were re-raised in 1976 the three cadet services were grouped together as the Australian Services Cadet Scheme, beforehand the three organisations were run under the directions of single service policy, in 2001 the name was changed to the Australian Defence Force Cadets as recommended by a review. While the Australian Defence Force Cadets is sponsored by ADF (Australian Defence Force) and runs under a similar rank structure, uniform and training activities, the ADFC is not an official branch of the Defence Force and runs in accordance with the Optional Protocol on the Involvement of Children in Armed Conflict which Australia has signed.

The ADFC encompasses three organizations:

- Australian Navy Cadets (ANC)
- Australian Army Cadets (AAC)
- Australian Air Force Cadets (AAFC)

Cadet units are referred to differently depending on the parent service. Air Force Cadet units are referred to as Squadrons, Navy Cadet units are referred to as Training Ships and Army Cadet units are referred to as Army Cadet Units.

== ADFC Ranks ==
=== Officer of Cadets (OOC) ranks ===
Australian Navy Cadets (ANC)
Insignia						
Rank	Captain; ANC	Commander; ANC	Lieutenant; Commander ANC	Lieutenant; ANC	Sub Lieutenant; ANC	Midshipman ANC
Abbreviation	CAPT, ANC	CMDR, ANC	LCDR, ANC	LEUT, ANC	SBLT, ANC	MIDN, ANC
Australian Army Cadets (AAC)
Insignia						
Rank	Colonel; AAC	Lieutenant Colonel; AAC	Major; AAC	Captain; AAC	Lieutenant; AAC	Second Lieutenant; AAC
Abbreviation	COL (AAC)	LTCOL (AAC)	MAJ (AAC)	CAPT (AAC)	LT (AAC)	2LT (AAC)
Australian Air Force Cadets (AAFC)
Insignia						
Rank	Group Captain (AAFC)	Wing Commander (AAFC)	Squadron Leader (AAFC)	Flight Lieutenant (AAFC)	Flying Officer (AAFC)	Pilot Officer (AAFC)
Abbreviation	GPCAPT(AAFC)	WGCDR(AAFC)	SQNLDR(AAFC)	FLTLT(AAFC)	FLGOFF(AAFC)	PLTOFF(AAFC)

=== Instructor of Cadets (IOC) ranks ===
Australian Navy Cadets (ANC)
Insignia								
Rank	Warrant Officer ANC (Inactive rank)	Chief Petty Officer ANC (Inactive rank)		Petty Officer ANC (Inactive rank)	Leading Seaman ANC (Inactive rank)		Able Seaman ANC (Inactive rank)	Provisional Instructor ANC (Inactive rank)
Abbreviation	WOANC	CPOANC		POANC	LSANC		ABANC	PIANC
Australian Army Cadets (AAC)
Insignia								
Rank	Warrant Officer Class One AAC (No longer in use as of 2020)	Warrant Officer Class Two AAC (No longer in use as of 2020)	Staff Sergeant AAC (Phased out as of 2019)	Sergeant AAC (No longer in use as of 2020)	Corporal AAC (No longer in use as of 2020)	Lance Corporal AAC (No longer in use as of 2020)		Trainee Officer of Cadets (As of 2022, only used by some battalions)
Abbreviation	WO1 (AAC)	WO2 (AAC)	SSGT (AAC)	SGT (AAC)	CPL (AAC)	LCPL (AAC)		TOOC
Australian Air Force Cadets (AAFC)
Insignia								
Rank	Warrant Officer (AAFC)	Flight Sergeant (AAFC)		Sergeant (AAFC)	Corporal (AAFC)		Leading Aircraftman/Leading Aircraftwoman (AAFC)	Aircraftman/Aircraftwoman (AAFC)
Abbreviation	WOFF(AAFC)	FSGT(AAFC)		SGT(AAFC)	CPL(AAFC)		LAC/W(AAFC)	AC/W(AAFC)

=== Cadets ranks ===
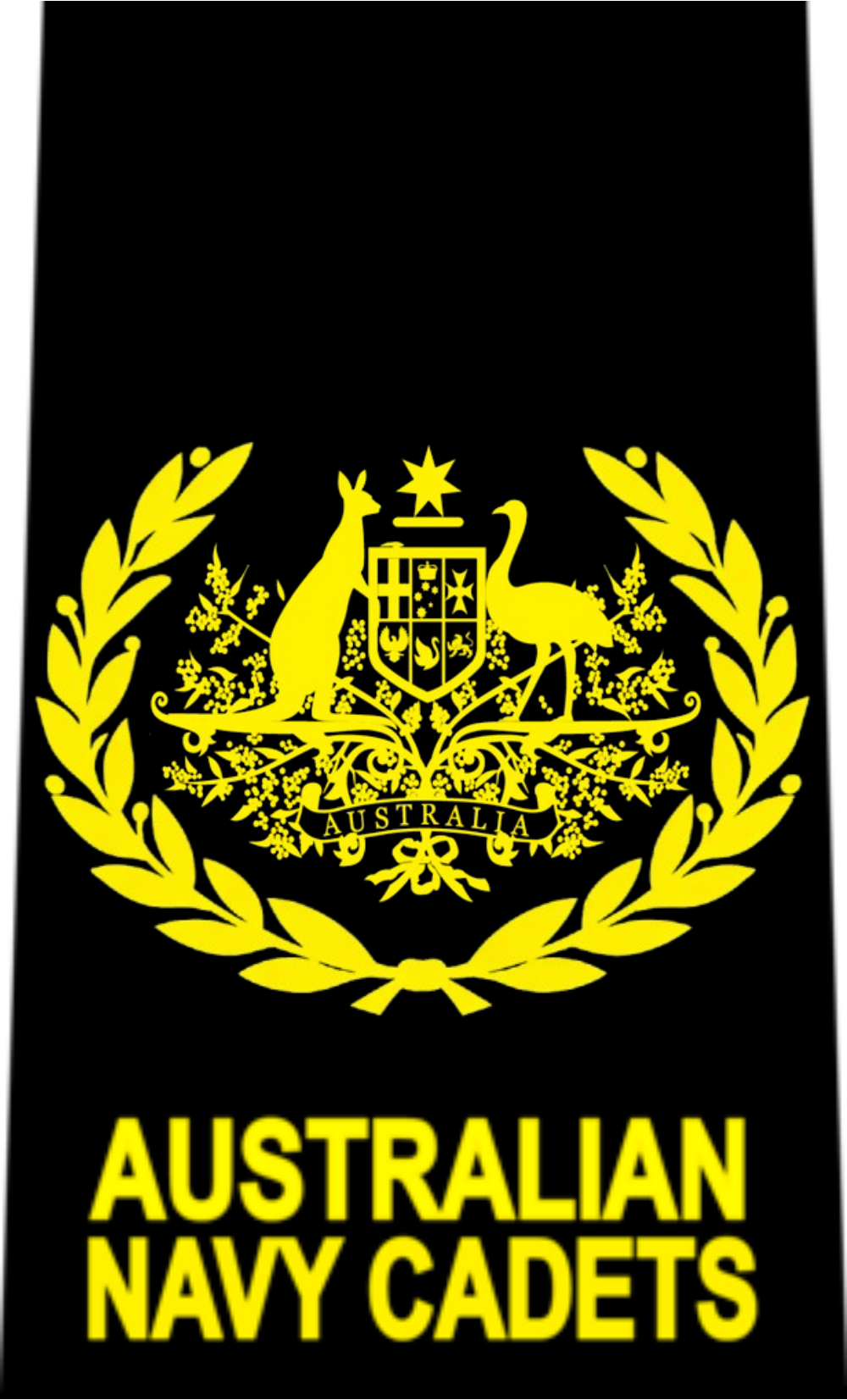
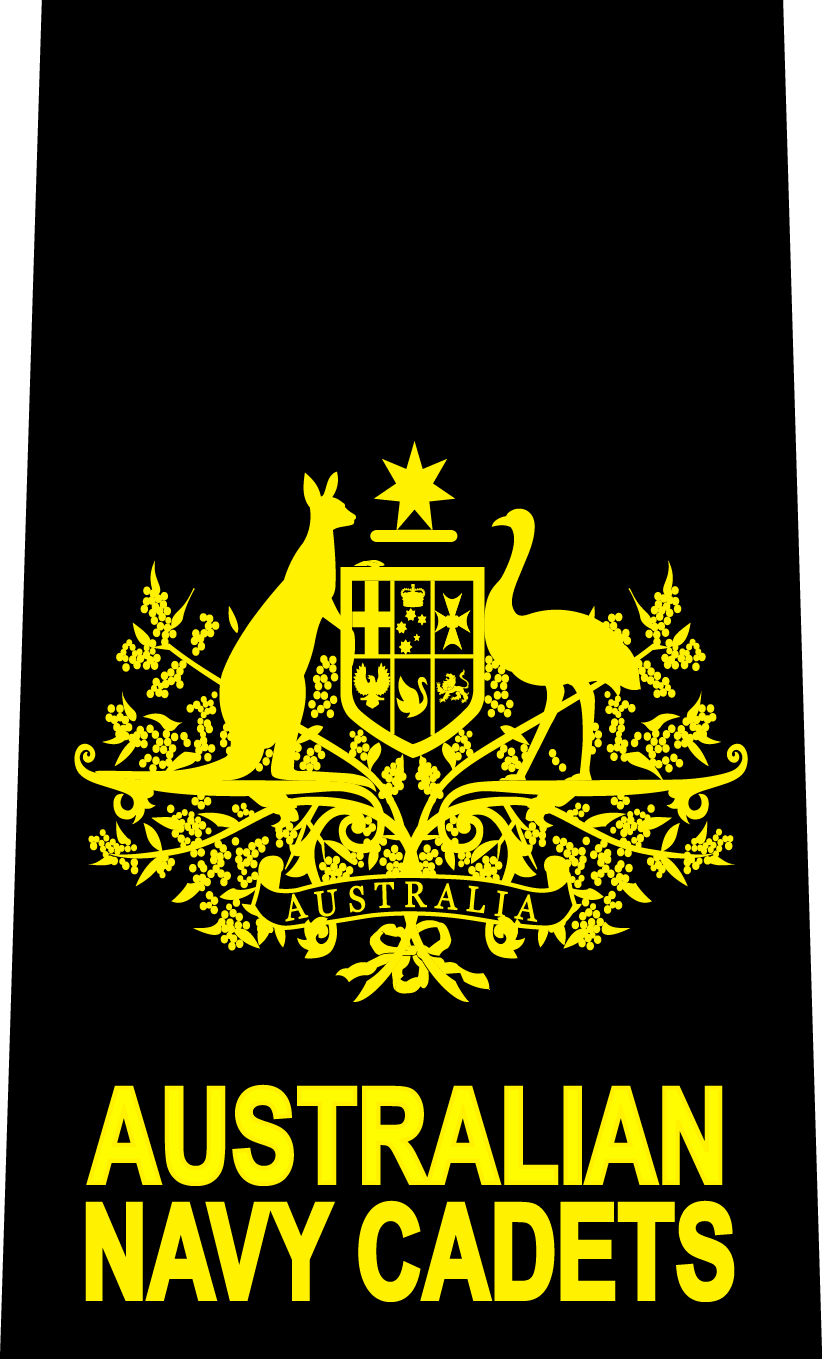
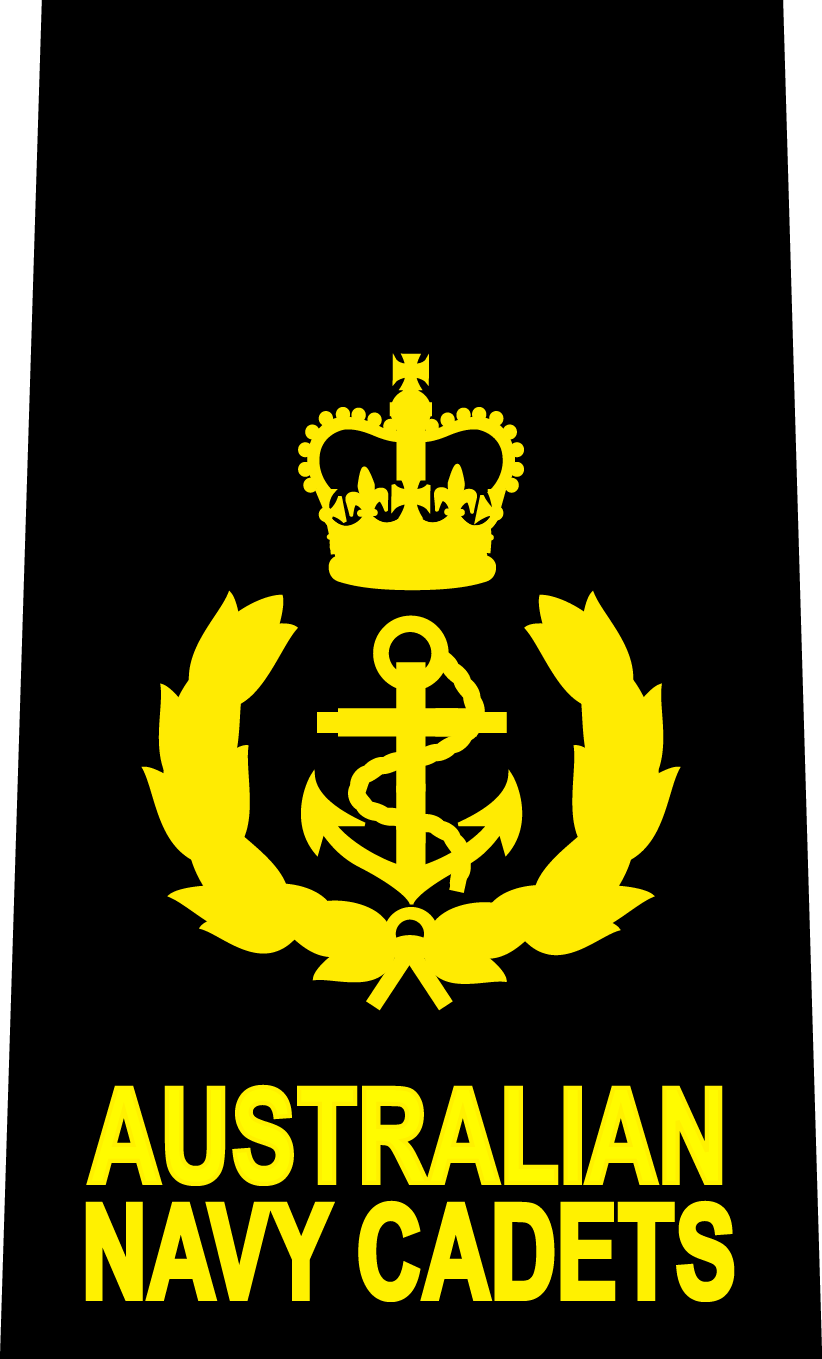
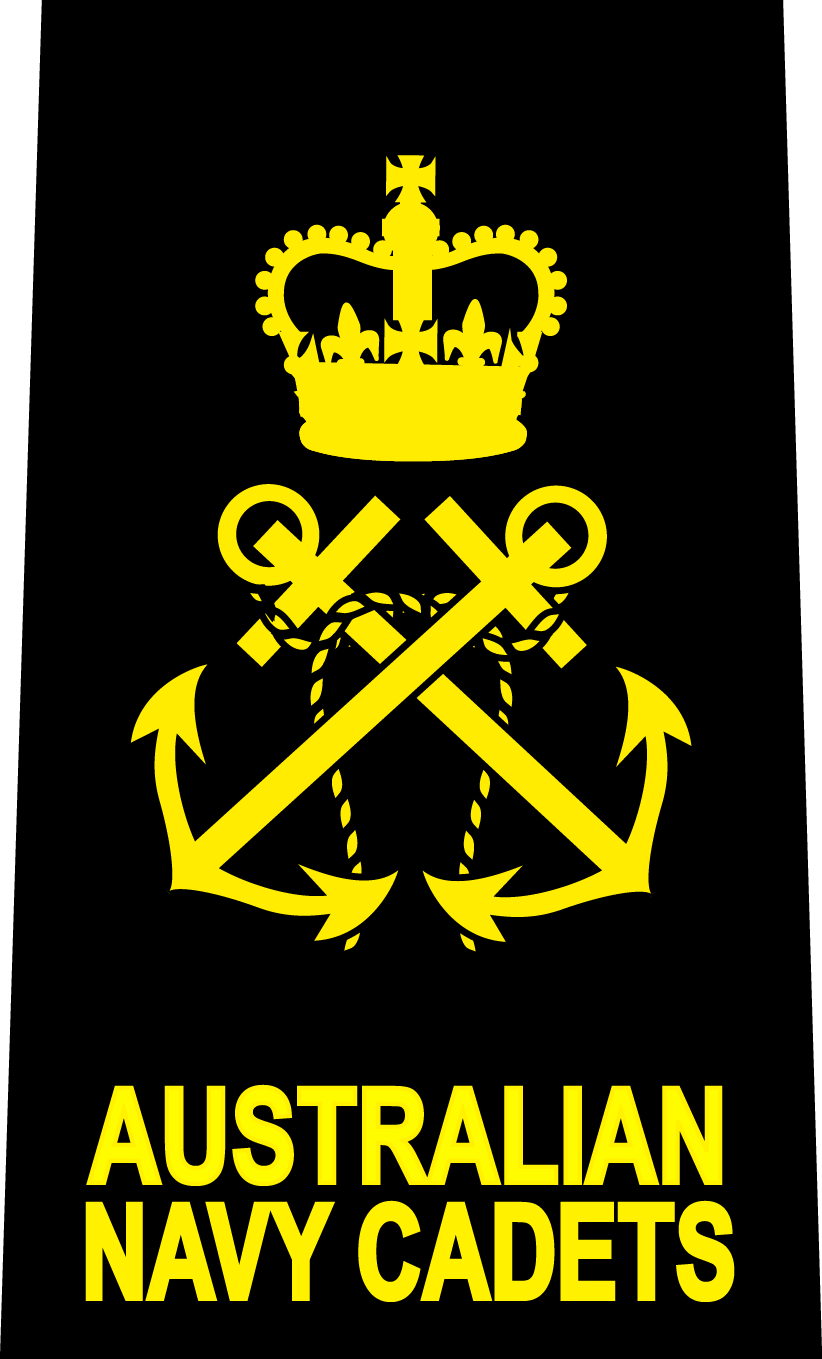
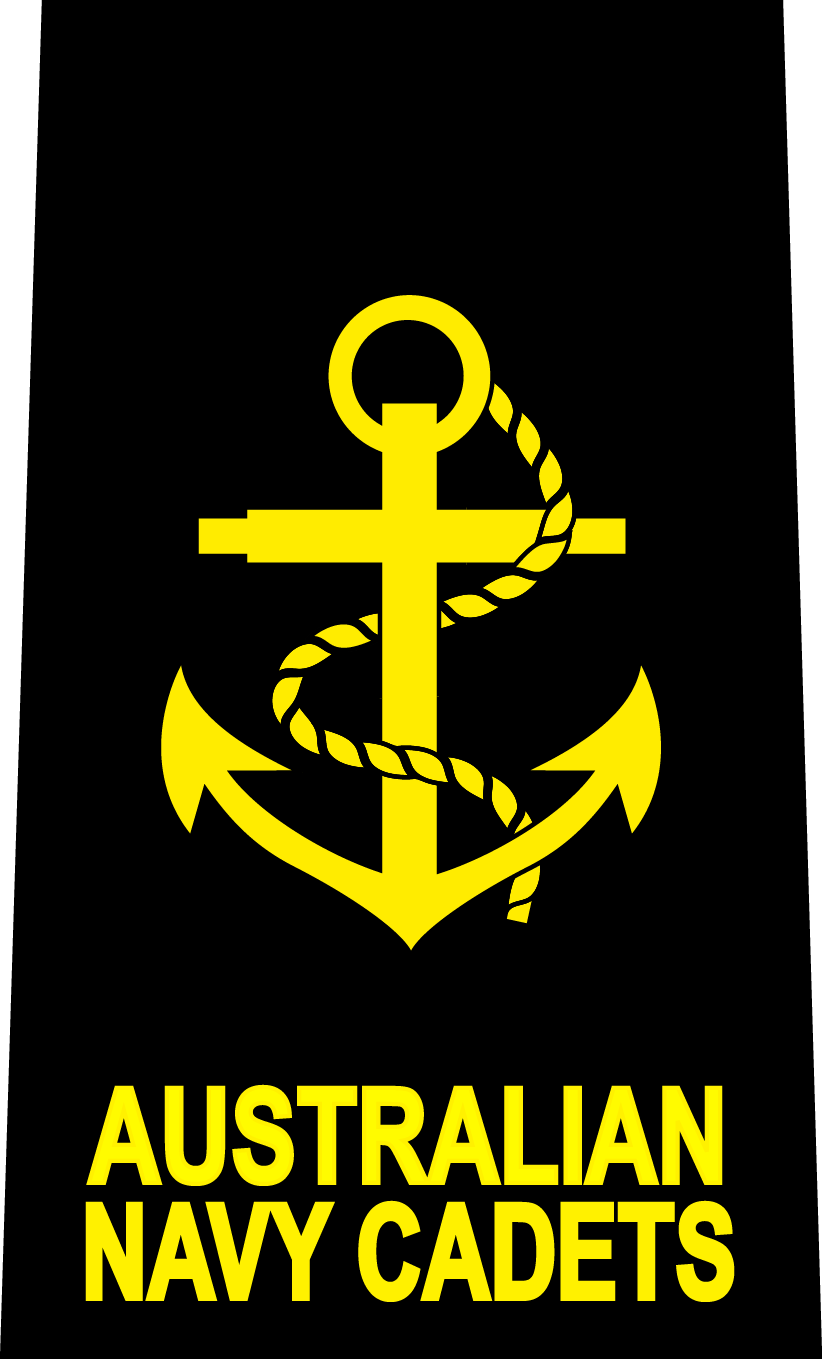
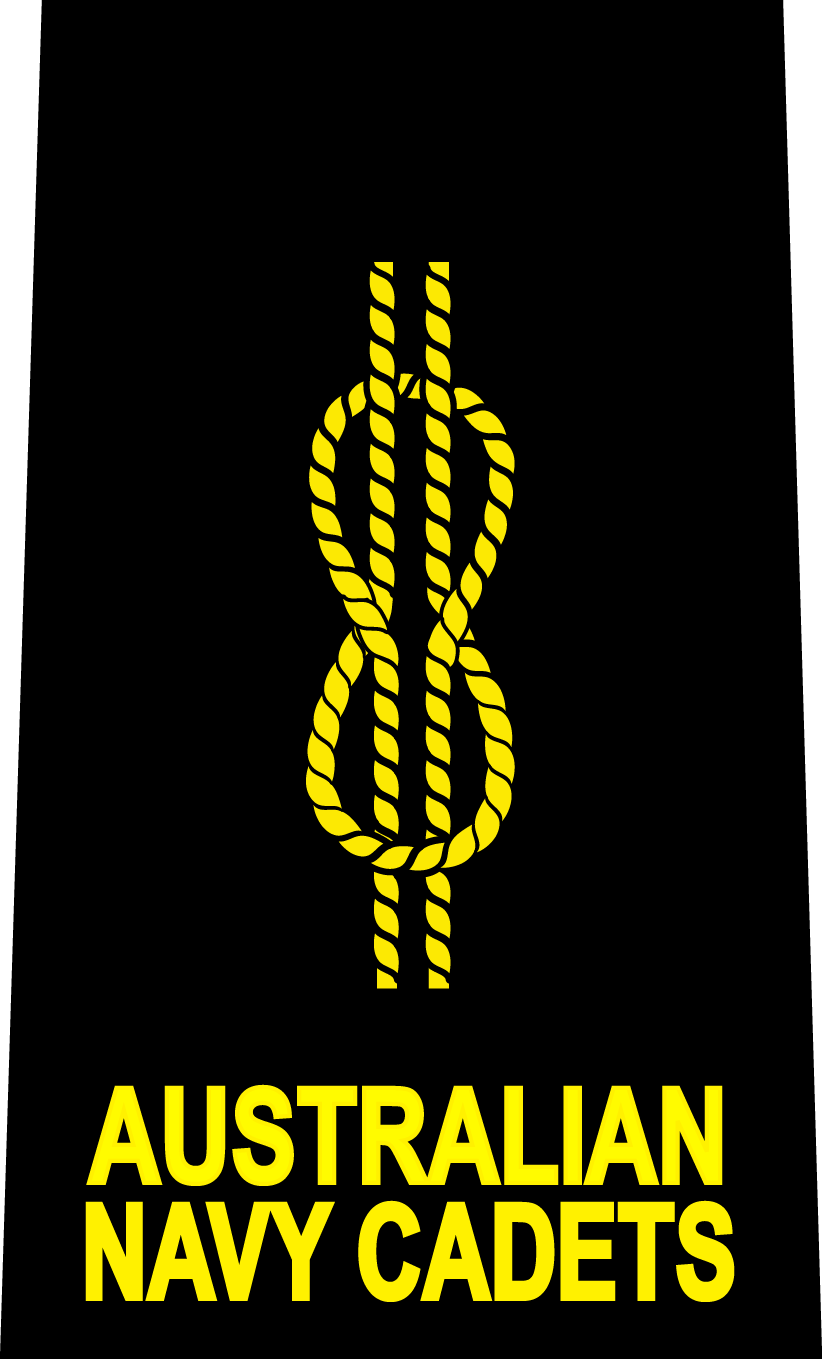
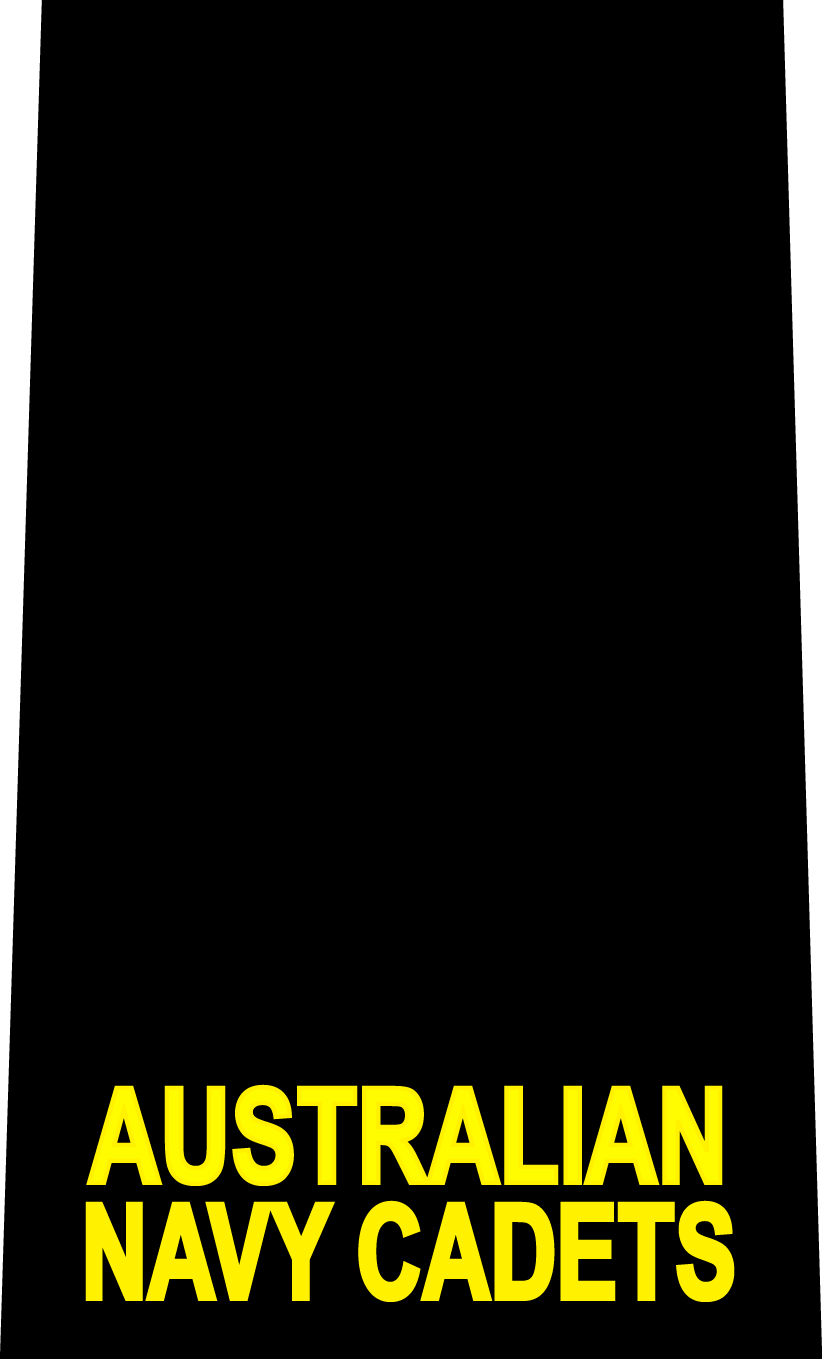
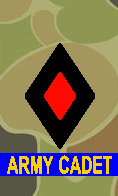
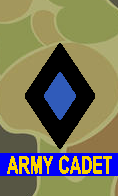
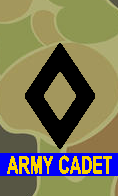
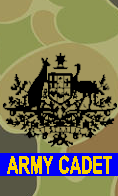
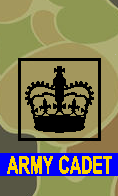
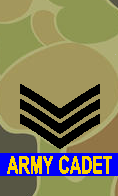
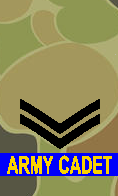
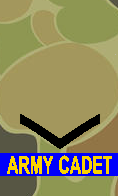
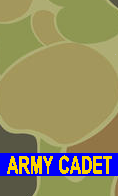
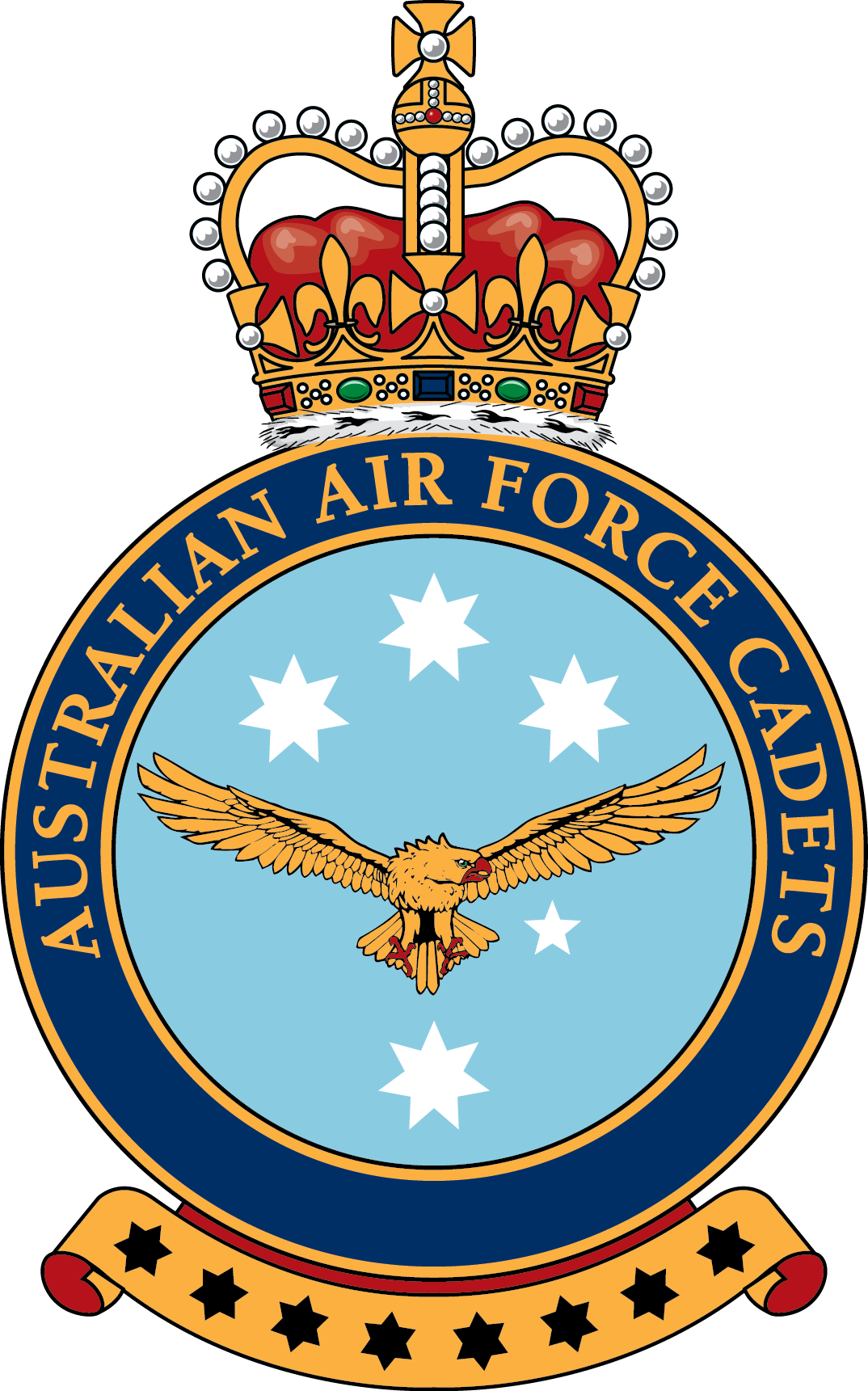
ADFC Cadets	CDT 9 (Special Grade)			CDT 8	CDT 7	CDT 6	CDT 5	CDT 4	CDT 3	CDT 2	CDT 1	CDT (R)
Australian Navy Cadets				No equivalent					No equivalent			No Insignia
Australian Navy Cadets	Cadet Warrant Officer of the ANC			No equivalent	Cadet Warrant Officer	Cadet Chief Petty Officer	Cadet Petty Officer	Cadet Leading Seaman	No equivalent	Cadet Able Seaman	Cadet Seaman	Cadet Recruit
Australian Navy Cadets	CWO-ANC			No equivalent	CDTWO	CDTCPO	CDTPO	CDTLS	No equivalent	CDTAB	CDTSMN	CDTRCT
ADFC Cadets	CDT 9 (Special Grade)			CDT 8	CDT 7	CDT 6	CDT 5	CDT 4	CDT 3	CDT 2	CDT 1	CDT (R)
Australian Army Cadets										No equivalent
Australian Army Cadets	National Cadet Under Officer	National Cadet Regimental Sergeant Major	Regional Cadet Under Officer	Cadet Under Officer	Cadet Warrant Officer Class One	Cadet Warrant Officer Class Two	Cadet Sergeant	Cadet Corporal	Cadet Lance Corporal	No equivalent	Cadet	Cadet Recruit
	NCUO	NRSM	RCUO	CUO	CDTWO1	CDTWO2	CDTSGT	CDTCPL	CDTLCPL	No equivalent	CDT	CDTREC
ADFC Cadets	CDT 9 (Special Grade)			CDT 8	CDT 7	CDT 6	CDT 5	CDT 4	CDT 3	CDT 2	CDT 1	CDT (R)
Australian Air Force Cadets	No equivalent								No equivalent			No insignia
Australian Air Force Cadets	No equivalent			Cadet Under Officer	Cadet Warrant Officer	Cadet Flight Sergeant	Cadet Sergeant	Cadet Corporal	No equivalent	Leading Cadet	Cadet	Cadet Recruit
Australian Air Force Cadets	No equivalent			CUO	CWOFF	CFSGT	CSGT	CCPL	No equivalent	LCDT	CDT	CDTRCT

== See also ==
- Cadets (youth program)
- National Cadet Advisory Council
- Ranks of the Junior Reserve Officers' Training Corps
- Cadet grades and insignia of the Civil Air Patrol
- Ranks of the cadet forces of the United Kingdom
- Cadets Canada elemental ranks
- New Zealand Cadet Forces ranks
