= Military reserve force =

Military organisation composed of ex-service civilians

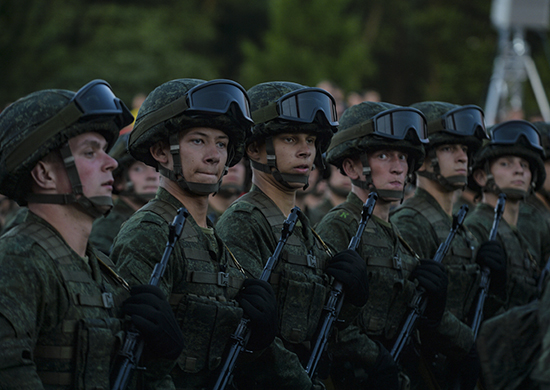
Reservists of the Territorial Defense Troops of Belarus, 2015

A military reserve force is a military organization whose members (reservists) have military and civilian occupations. They are not normally kept under arms, and their main role is to be available when their military requires additional manpower. Reserve forces are generally considered part of a permanent standing body of armed forces, and allow a nation to reduce its peacetime military expenditures and maintain a force prepared for war. During peacetime, reservists typically serve part-time alongside a civilian job, although most reserve forces have a significant permanent full-time component as well. Reservists may be deployed for weeks or months-long missions during peacetime to support specific operations. During wartime, reservists may be kept in service for months or years at a time, although typically not for as long as active duty soldiers.

In countries with a volunteer military, reserve forces maintain military skills by training periodically (typically one weekend per month). They may do so as individuals or as members of standing reserve regiments—for example, the UK's Army Reserve. A militia, home guard, state guard or state military may constitute part of a military reserve force, such as the United States National Guard and the Norwegian, Swedish and Danish Home Guard. In some countries (including Colombia, Israel, Norway, Singapore, South Korea, Sweden, and Taiwan), reserve service is compulsory for a number of years after completing national service. In countries with conscription, such as Switzerland and Finland, reserve forces are citizens who have completed active duty military service but have not reached the upper age limit established by law. These citizens are subject to mandatory mobilization in wartime and short-term military training in peacetime.

In countries which combine conscription and a volunteer military, such as Russia, "military reserve force" has two meanings. In a broad sense, a military reserve force is a group of citizens who can be mobilized as part of the armed forces. In a narrow sense, a military reserve force is a group of citizens who have signed contracts to perform military service as reservists, who were appointed to positions in particular military units, and who are involved in all operational, mobilization, and combat activities of these units (active reserve). Other citizens who do not sign a contract (the inactive reserve) can be mobilized and deployed on an involuntary basis.

== History ==
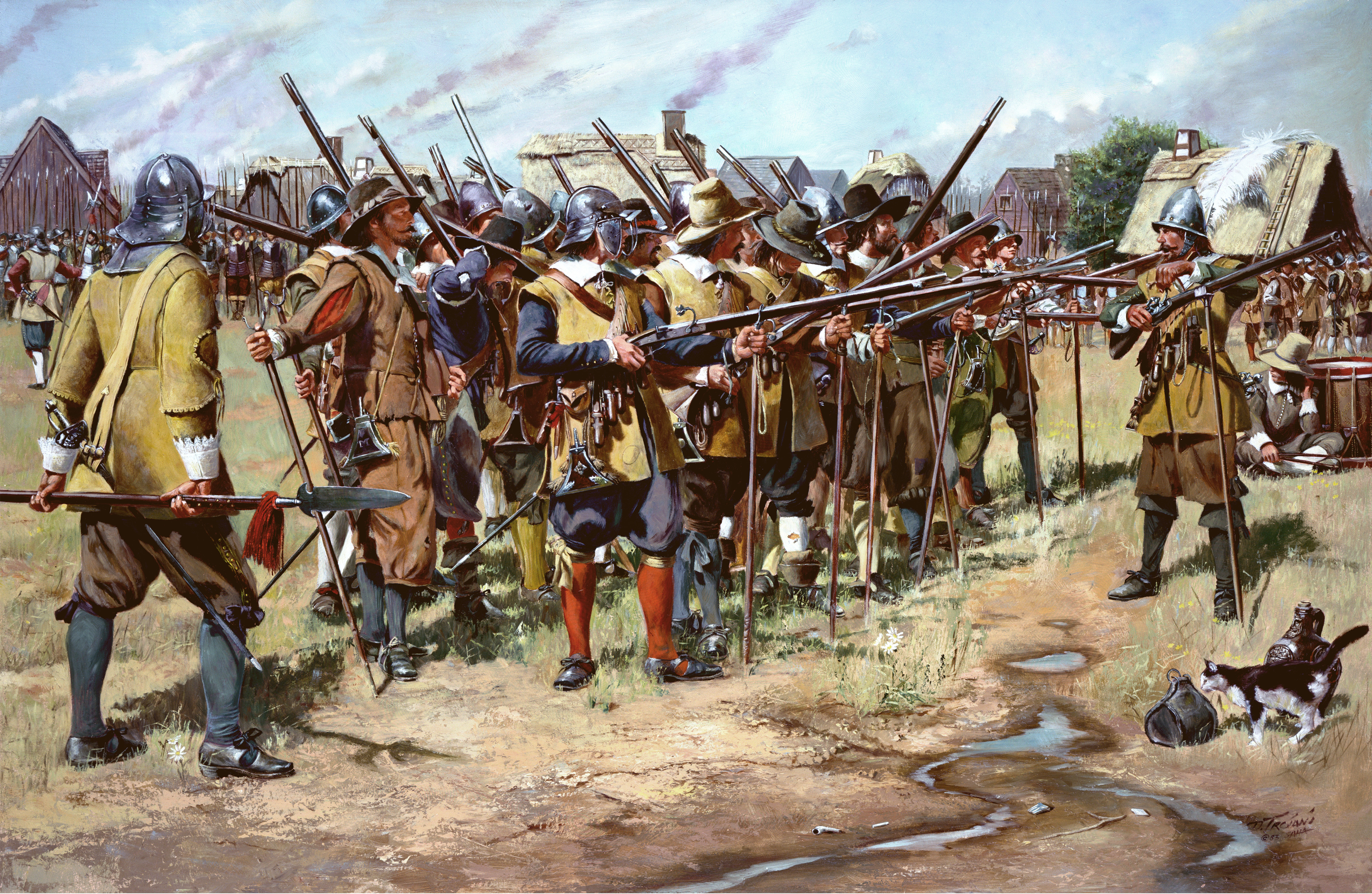
The Massachusetts Militia's first muster in 1637

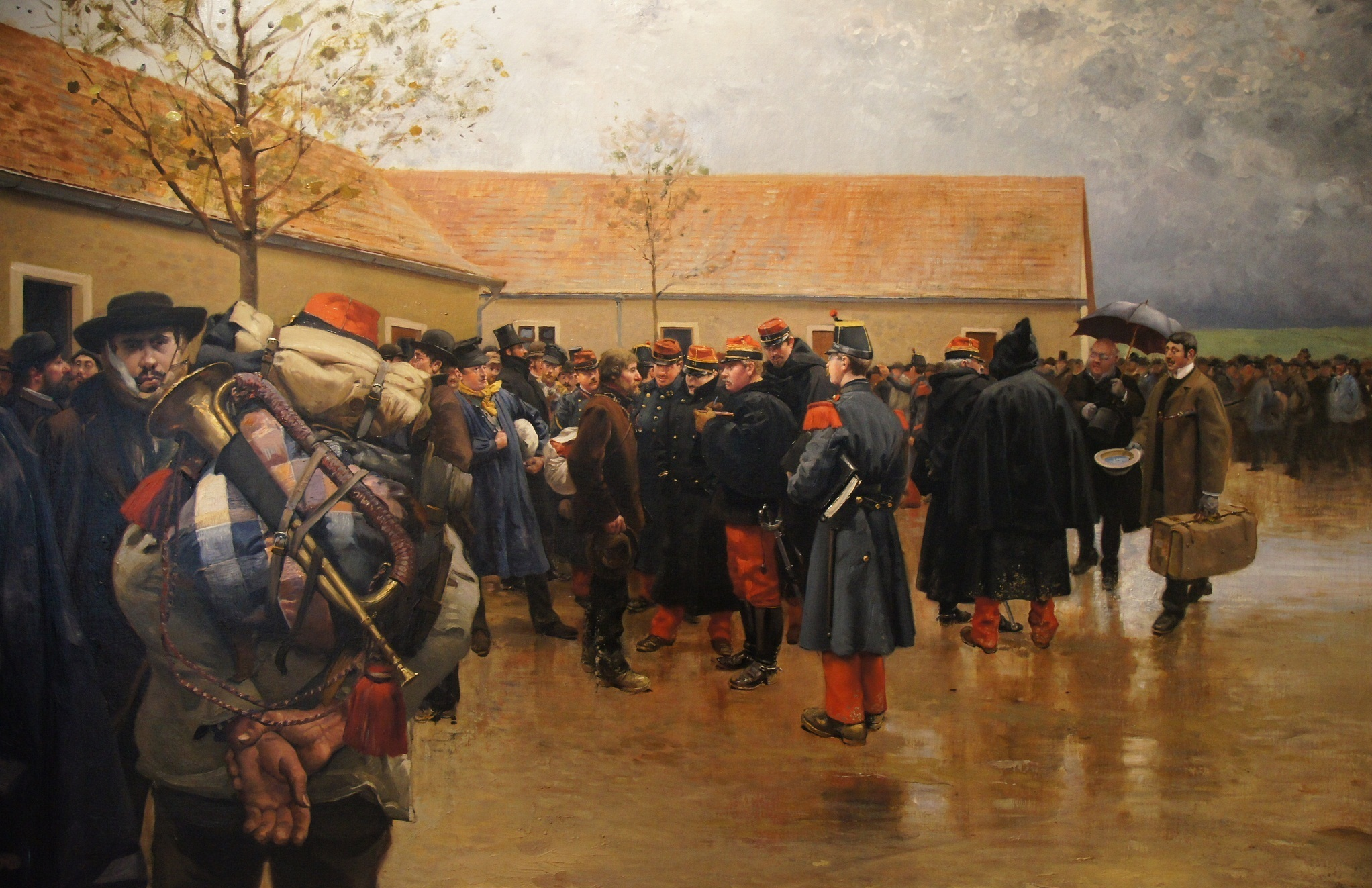
French reservists being mustered in 1870 following the outbreak of the Franco-Prussian War

Some countries' 18th-century military systems included practices and institutions which functioned as a reserve force, even if they were not designated as such. For example, the half-pay system in the British Army provided the country with trained, experienced officers not on active duty during peacetime but available during wartime. The Militia Act 1757 gave Britain an institutional structure for a reserve force. Although contemporaries debated the effectiveness of the British militia, its mobilization in several conflicts increased Britain's strategic options by freeing regular forces for overseas theaters.

Reservists first played a significant role in Europe after the Prussian defeat in the Battle of Jena–Auerstedt. On 9 July 1807, in the Treaties of Tilsit, Napoleon forced Prussia to drastically reduce its military strength and cede large amounts of territory. The Prussian army was limited to a maximum of 42,000 men.

The Krumpersystem, introduced to the Prussian Army by military reformer Gerhard von Scharnhorst, gave recruits a brief period of training which could be expanded during wartime. Prussia could draw upon a large number of trained soldiers in subsequent wars, and the system was retained by the Imperial German Army into the First World War. By the time of the German Empire, reservists were given "war arrangements" after completion of their military service with instructions for the conduct of reservists in wartime.

== Sources of reserve personnel ==
In countries such as the United States, reservists are often former military members who reached the end of their enlistment or service obligation. Service in the reserve for a number of years after leaving active service is required in the enlistment contracts and commissioning orders of many nations.

Reservists can also be civilians who undertake basic and specialized training in parallel with regular forces while retaining their civilian roles. They can be deployed independently, or their personnel may make up shortages in regular units. Ireland's Army Reserve is an example of such a reserve.

With universal conscription, most of the male population may be reservists. All men in Finland belong to the reserve until 60 years of age, and 65 percent of each age cohort of men are drafted and receive at least six months of military training. Ten percent of conscripts are trained as reserve officers. Reservists and reserve officers are occasionally called up for refresher exercises, but receive no monthly salary or position. South Korean males who finish their national service in the armed forces or in the national police are automatically placed on the reserve roster, and are obligated to take several days of annual military training for seven years.

== Uses ==
In wartime, reserve personnel may provide replacements for combat losses or be used to form new units. Reservists can provide garrison duty, manning air defense, internal security and guarding of important points such as supply depots, prisoner of war camps, communications nodes, air and sea bases and other vital areas, freeing regular troops for service on the front.

In peacetime, reservists can be used for internal-security duties and disaster relief, sparing the regular military forces. In many countries where military roles outside warfare are restricted, reservists are exempted from these restrictions.

== Personnel ==
=== Enlisted personnel ===
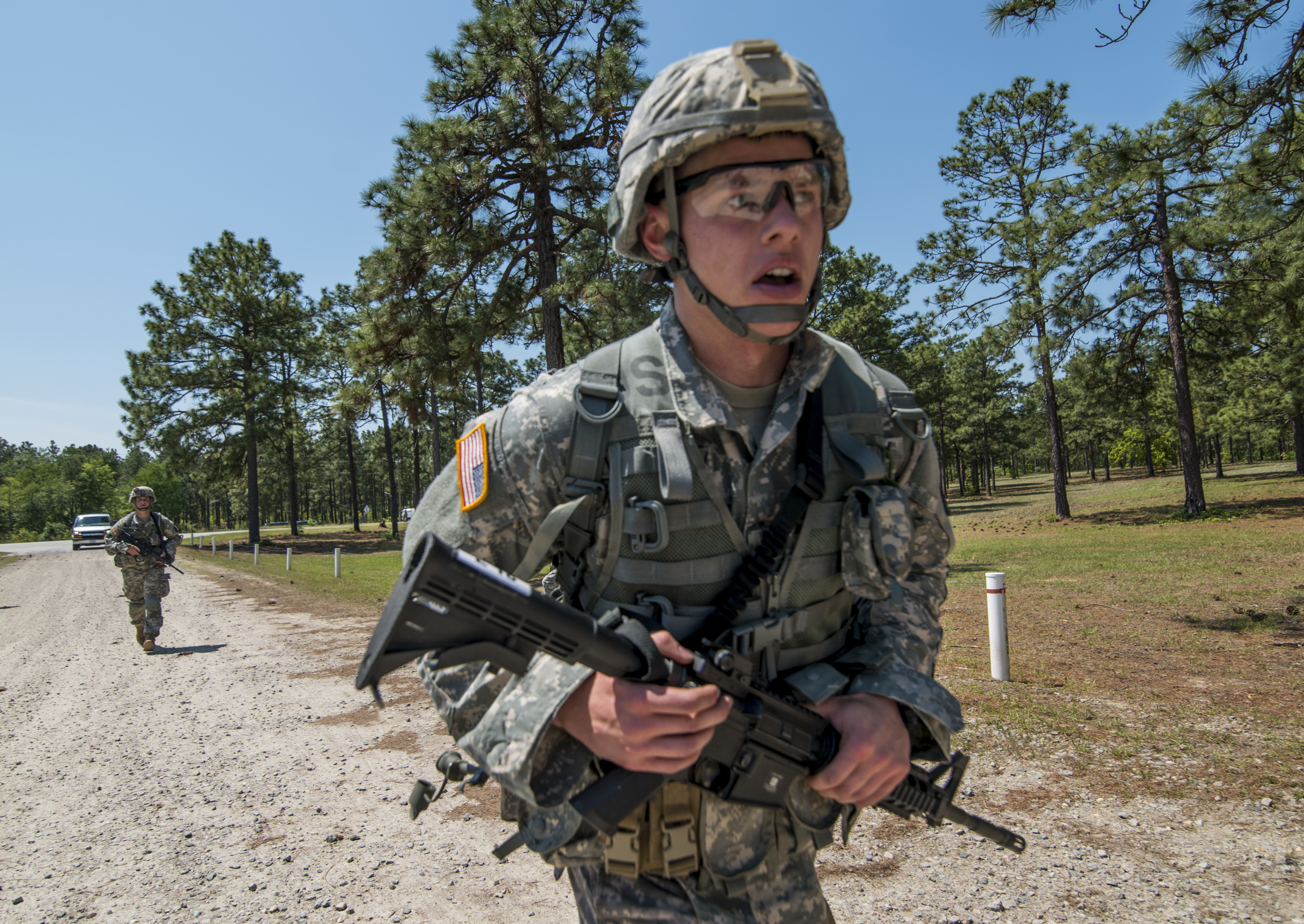
U.S. Army Reserve private first class during the 2015 Army Reserve Best Warrior Competition at Fort Bragg

In countries with a volunteer army, reserve enlisted personnel are soldiers, sailors, and airmen who have signed contracts to perform military service on a part-time basis. They have civilian status, except for the days when they are carrying out their military duties (usually two or three days each month and attendance at a two-to-four-week military training camp once per year). Most reserve enlisted personnel are former active duty soldiers, sailors, and airmen, but some join the reserve without an active-duty background. When their contract expires, a reserve soldier, sailor or airman becomes a retired soldier, sailor or airman.

In countries with conscription, reserve enlisted personnel are soldiers, sailors, and airmen who are not on active duty and have not reached the upper age limit established by law. In addition to the upper age limit, intermediate age limits determine the priority of wartime mobilization (younger ages are more subject to mobilization). These limits divide the reserve into categories, such as the Swiss Auszug, Landwehr, and Landsturm. Reserve soldiers, sailors, and airmen are subject to mandatory short-term military training in peacetime, as regulated by law. Reserve soldiers, sailors, and airmen have civilian status, except for military training in peacetime and wartime mobilization. A reserve soldier, sailor or airman becomes a retired soldier, sailor or airman at the upper age limit.

In countries which combine conscription and a volunteer military, reserve soldiers, sailors, and airmen are divided into two categories: reservists and reserve enlisted personnel. Reservists sign a contract to perform military service on a part-time basis. Reserve enlisted personnel are not on active duty, have not signed a contract to perform military service as reservists, and have not reached the upper age limit. Reservists have civilian status, except when they are performing military duties. Reserve enlisted personnel have civilian status, except for military training in peacetime and wartime mobilization. Reservists are first subject to mobilization in wartime. Reserve enlisted soldiers, sailors, and airmen are divided into categories which determine the priority of wartime mobilization (younger personnel are mobilized first), such as Первый разряд (first category), Второй разряд (second category) and Третий разряд (third category) in Russia. A reservist becomes a reserve soldier, sailor or airman when their contract expires, and retires at the upper age limit.

=== Non-commissioned officers ===
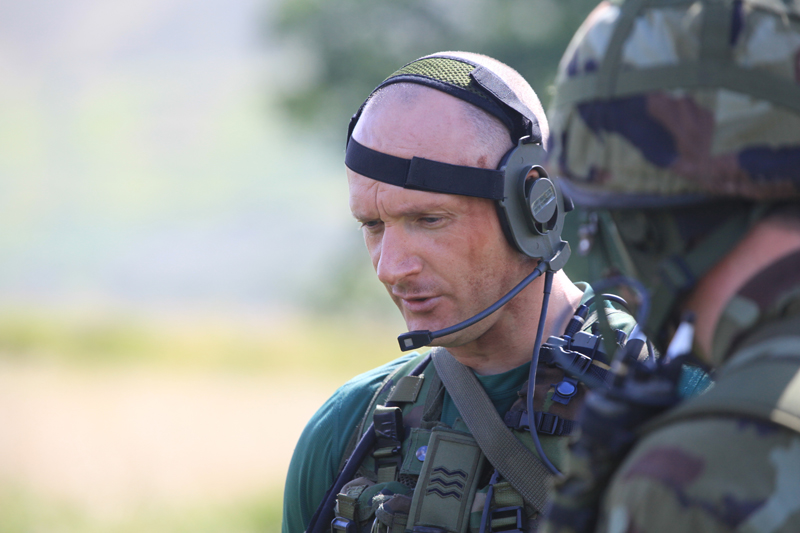
Irish Army Reserve non-commissioned officer leading a tactical exercise

In countries with a volunteer military, reserve non-commissioned officers are military personnel with relevant rank who have contracted to perform military service on a part-time basis. They have civilian status, except for military duty. Most reserve non-commissioned officers are former active-duty NCOs, but some become reserve NCOs without an active-duty background. When the contract expires, a reserve NCO becomes a retired NCO. The main sources of reserve NCOs are:

- Movement from active-duty to reserve service, preserving NCO rank
- Military schools, which prepare career NCOs who join the reserve after their active-duty service
- Promotion from enlisted rank during reserve service
- Reserve NCO courses

In countries with conscription, reserve NCOs are military personnel with relevant rank who are not on active duty and have not reached the upper age limit. In addition to the upper age limit, intermediate age limits determine the priority of wartime mobilization (younger ages are subject to mobilization first). Reserve NCOs are subject to mandatory short-term military training in peacetime. They have civilian status, except for military training in peacetime and wartime mobilization. A reserve NCO becomes a retired NCO at the upper age limit. Their main sources of NCOs are:

- Promotion from enlisted rank during active-duty service, following demobilization
- Promotion from enlisted rank during short-term military training in peacetime
- Military schools
- Reserve NCO courses

In countries which combine conscription and a volunteer military, reserve NCOs are divided into two categories: non-commissioned officers-reservists and reserve non-commissioned officers. Non-commissioned officers-reservists have signed a contract to perform military service on a part-time basis. Reserve non-commissioned officers are not on active duty, have not signed a contract to perform military service as reservists, and have not reached the upper age limit. Non-commissioned officers-reservists have civilian status, except for the days when they are carrying out their military duties. Reserve non-commissioned officers have civilian status, except for military training in peacetime and wartime mobilization. Non-commissioned officers-reservists are subject to mobilization in wartime first. Reserve non-commissioned officers (non-reservists) are divided into categories which determine the priority of wartime mobilization (younger ages are subject to mobilization first) – Первый разряд, Второй разряд, and Третий разряд in Russia. Upon expiration of the contract, a non-commissioned officer-reservist becomes a reserve non-commissioned officer. A reserve NCO becomes a retired NCO at the upper age limit. The main sources of reserve NCOs are:

- Promotion from enlisted rank during active duty service, following demobilization
- Promotion from enlisted rank during short-term military training in peacetime
- Military schools
- Promotion from enlisted rank during reserve service
- Reserve NCO courses

=== Warrant officers ===
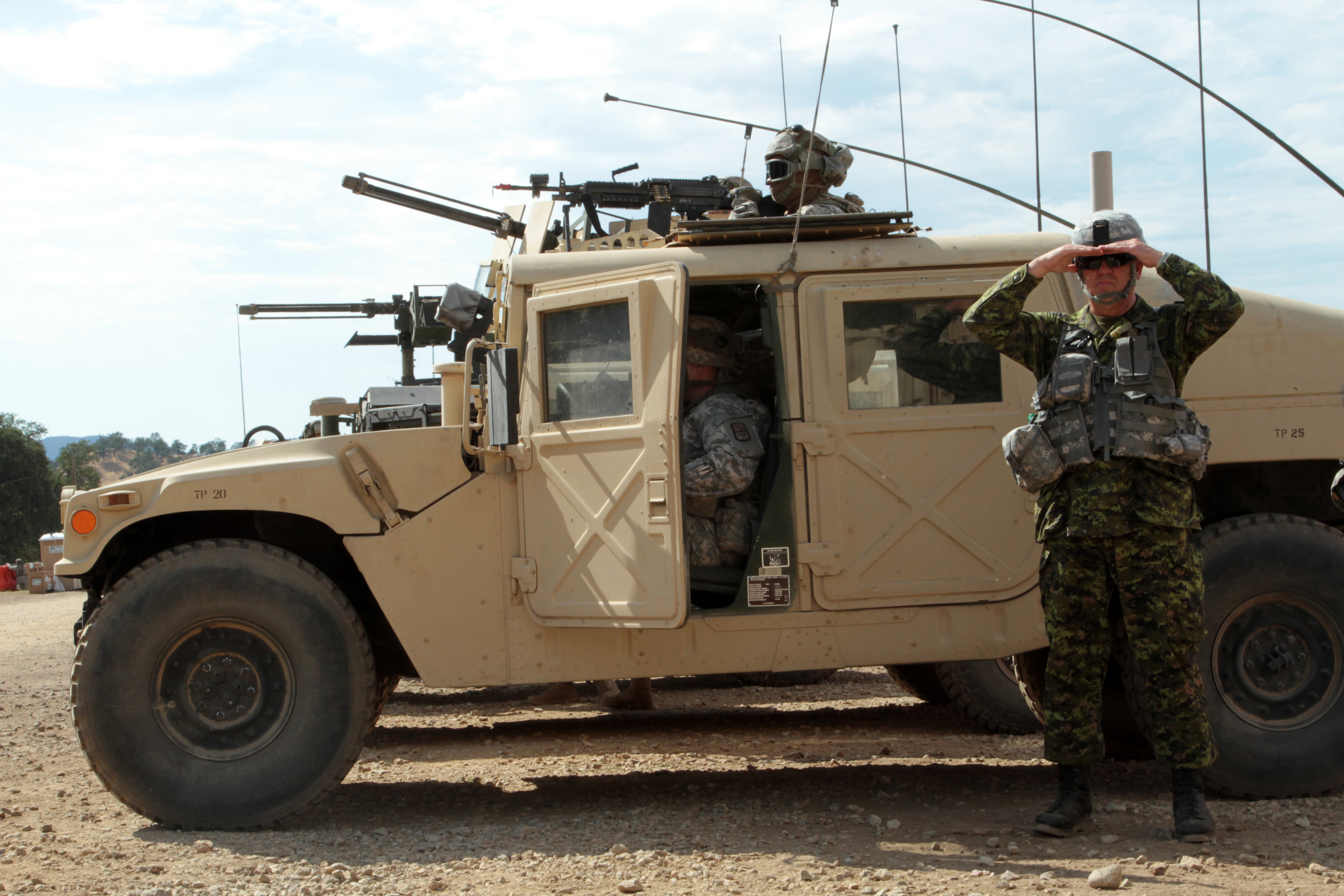
A Canadian Army Reserve warrant officer during Warrior Exercise (WAREX) in 2014

In countries with a volunteer military, reserve warrant officers are military personnel with relevant rank who have signed a contract to perform military service on a part-time basis. They have civilian status, except for the days when they are carrying out their military duties. Most reserve warrant officers are former active duty warrant officers. The main sources of reserve warrant officers are military schools and reserve warrant-officers courses.

In countries with conscription, reserve warrant officers are military personnel with the relevant rank who are not on active duty and have not reached the upper age limit. In addition to the upper-age limit, intermediate age limits determine wartime mobilization priority; younger officers are mobilized first. The main sources of reserve warrant officers are promotion during active-duty service or short-term peacetime training, assessment after demobilization, military schools, and reserve warrant-officer courses.

=== Commissioned officers ===
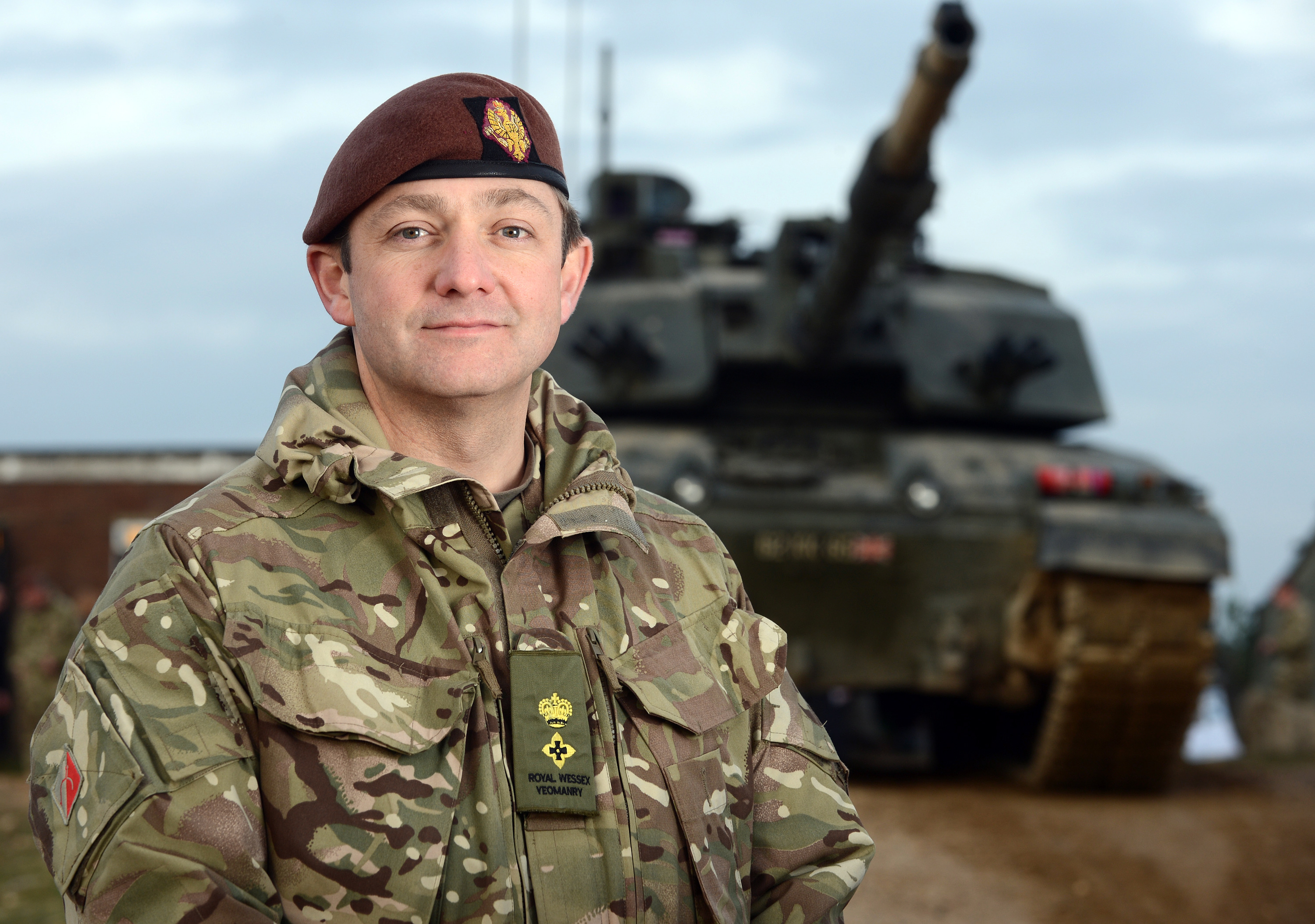
A British Army Reserve lieutenant colonel during a training exercise at Lulworth Cove in Dorset

In countries with a volunteer military, reserve officers are personnel with an officer's commission who have signed a contract to perform part-time military service. They have civilian status, except when carrying out their military duties. Most reserve officers are former active-duty officers, but some become reserve officers after promotion. The main sources of reserve officers are:

- Military schools, colleges and academies, which prepare career officers (who join the reserve after concluding active duty)
- Military educational units in civilian higher-education institutions of higher education, such as the US' Reserve Officers' Training Corps
- Reserve officer's courses
- Direct commission

In countries with conscription, reserve officers are officers who are not on active duty and have not reached the upper age limit. The main sources of reserve officers are:

- Training and assessment at the end of conscript service. About eight percent of Finnish conscripts become reserve officers after one year of service.
- Military educational units in civilian higher-education institutions, such as military departments (Ukrainian: військова кафедра) in Ukraine and military faculties (Belarusian: ваенны факультэт) in Belarus
- Military schools, colleges and academies, which prepare career officers (who join the reserve after concluding active duty)
- Reserve-officer courses

In countries with conscription and volunteers, the main sources of reserve officers are:

- Military educational units in civilian higher-education institutions such as Russia's military training centers (Russian: военный учебный центр), which prepare officers (who join the reserve after graduation or after concluding active duty)
- Military schools, colleges and academies, which prepare career officers (who join the reserve after concluding active duty)
- Reserve-officer courses
- Training and assessment at the conclusion of conscript service

== Advantages ==
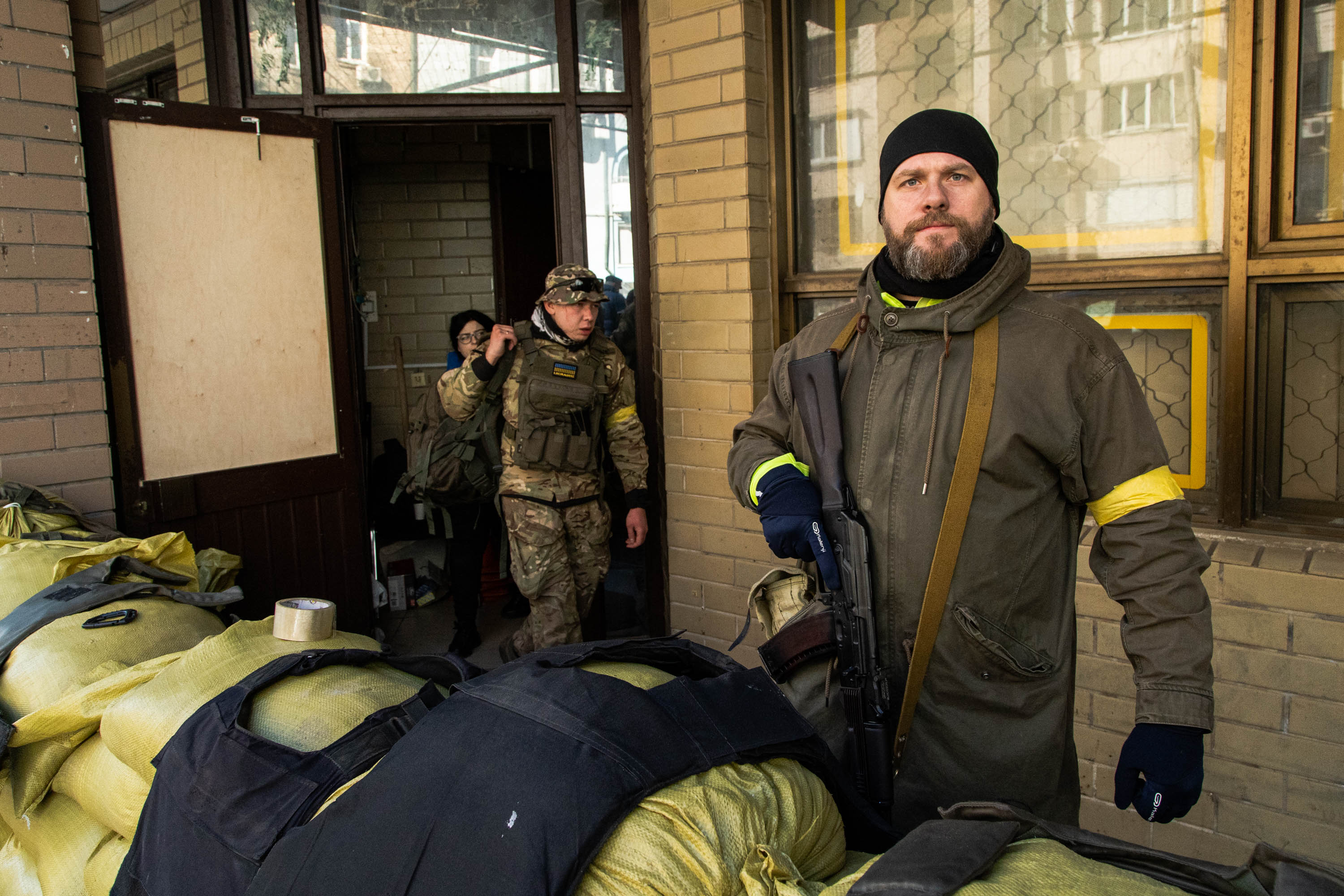
Ukrainian Territorial Defense Forces soldiers during the 2022 Russian invasion of Ukraine

Military reserve personnel quickly increase available manpower substantially with trained personnel. Reservists may contain experienced combat veterans who can increase the quantity and quality of a force. Reservists also tend to have training in professions outside the military, and skills attained in a number of professions are useful in the military. In many countries, reserve forces have capable people who would not otherwise consider a career in the military.

A large reserve pool can allow a government to avoid the costs, political and financial, of new recruits or conscripts. Reservists are usually more economically effective than regular troops, since they are called up as needed, rather than being always on duty. Preparations to institute a call-up (obvious to adversaries) can display determination, boost morale, and deter aggression.

Many reservists see voluntary training as merely for supplemental income or a hobby, and so reservists are inexpensive to maintain, their cost being limited to training and occasional deployments. The skills of reservists have been valuable in peacekeeping because they can be employed for the reconstruction of infrastructure, and tend to have better relations with the civilian population than career soldiers.

== Disadvantages ==
Reservists are usually provided with second-line equipment which is no longer used by the regular army, or is an older version of that in current service. Reservists also have little experience with newer weapons systems. Reservists who are retired service personnel are sometimes considered less motivated than regular troops. Reservists who combine a military and civilian career, such as members of the United Kingdom's Army Reserve, experience time demands not experienced by regular troops which affect their availability and length of service.

== Forces by country ==
=== Australia ===
- Royal Australian Naval Reserve
- Australian Army Reserve
- Royal Australian Air Force Reserve

=== Austria ===
- Austrian Armed Forces Militia

=== Brazil ===
- Brazilian Military Police
- Military Firefighters Corps

=== Canada ===
- Primary Reserve
  - Canadian Forces Naval Reserve (NAVRES)
  - Canadian Army Reserve
  - Canadian Forces Air Reserve
  - Canadian Forces Health Services Reserve
- Canadian Forces Supplementary Reserve
- Canadian Rangers
- Cadet Organizations Administration and Training Service
- Canadian Cadet Organizations and Junior Canadian Rangers

=== People's Republic of China ===
- Chinese Paramilitary Forces

=== Colombia ===
- Army Reserve Professional Corps
- Navy Reserve Professional Corps
- Air Force Reserve Professional Corps

=== Czech Republic ===
- Active Reserve

=== Denmark ===
- Royal Danish Air force Reserve
- Army Reserve
- Navy Reserve
- Defence Health Reserve
- Home Guard

=== Estonia ===
- Estonian Defence League

=== Finland ===
- Territorial Forces

=== France ===
- Military reserve forces of France
- National Guard (France)

=== Greece ===
- Voluntary Reservist

=== Indonesia ===
- Indonesian National Armed Forces Reserve Component

=== India ===
- Territorial Army

=== Ireland ===
- Reserve Defence Forces
  - Army Reserve
  - Naval Service Reserve

=== Israel ===
- Israel Defense Forces Reserve Service

=== Italy ===
- Riserva Selezionata (Italian Army, Italian Navy, Italian Air Force and Carabinieri)
- Corpo Militare Volontario della Croce Rossa Italiana

=== Japan ===
- Self-Defense Forces Ready Reserve
- Self-Defense Forces Reserve
- Self-Defense Forces Reserve Candidate

=== Latvia ===
- Latvian National Guard

=== Lithuania ===
- National Defence Volunteer Forces

=== Malaysia ===
- Malaysian Armed Forces Reserve
  - Territorial Army of Malaysia
  - Royal Malaysian Naval Volunteer Reserve
  - Royal Malaysian Air Force Volunteer Reserve

=== Netherlands ===
- National Reserve Corps
- Netherlands Air Force Reserve
- Netherlands Navy Reserve
- Netherlands Marechaussee Reserve

=== New Zealand ===
- Royal New Zealand Naval Volunteer Reserve
- New Zealand Army Reserve

=== Norway ===
- Norwegian Home Guard

=== Pakistan ===
- Civil Armed Forces (nine forces)
- National Guard (two forces)

=== Philippines ===
- Armed Forces of the Philippines Reserve Command
- Army Reserve Command, PA
- Air Reserve Command, PAF
- Naval Reserve Command, PN
- Philippine Coast Guard Auxiliary

=== Poland ===
- Territorial Defence Force

=== Russia ===
- Mobilization Human Reserve

=== Singapore ===
- National Servicemen
- SAF Volunteer Corps

=== South Africa ===
- South African National Defence Force Reserve Force Component
- South African Army Reserve
- South African Air Force Reserve
- South African Navy Reserve
- South African Military Health Service Reserve

=== South Korea ===
- Republic of Korea Reserve Forces

=== Former Soviet Union ===
- Reserve Front
- Reserve of the Supreme High Command
- Reserve armies

=== Spain ===
- Voluntary Reservist

=== Sri Lanka ===
- Sri Lanka Army Volunteer Force
  - Sri Lanka National Guard
- Sri Lanka Volunteer Naval Force
- Sri Lanka Volunteer Air Force

=== Sweden ===
- Swedish Home Guard

=== Switzerland ===
- Swiss Reserve

=== Taiwan ===
- Republic of China Armed Forces Reserve

=== Thailand ===
- Student Army Reserve Force

=== United Kingdom ===
- Volunteer Reserve:
  - Royal Naval Reserve (including the University Royal Naval Unit)
  - Royal Marines Reserve
  - Army Reserve (including the Officers' Training Corps)
  - Royal Auxiliary Air Force
  - Royal Air Force Volunteer Reserve (incl. University Air Squadron)
- Regular Reserve:
  - Royal Fleet Reserve
  - Army Reserve (Regular)
  - Air Force Reserve
- Sponsored Reserves:
  - Royal Fleet Auxiliary
  - Mobile Meteorological Unit

=== Ukraine ===
- Territorial Defense Forces

=== United States ===
- United States Army Reserve
- United States Air Force Reserve
- United States Marine Corps Reserve
- United States Navy Reserve
- United States Coast Guard Reserve
- National Guard of the United States
  - Army National Guard of the United States
  - Air National Guard of the United States

=== Vietnam ===
- Vietnam Militia and Self-Defence Force

=== Yugoslavia ===
- Territorial Defense (TO)

== See also ==
- Military reserve
- National Guard
- State defense force
- Militia
- Maritime militia
