= Royal Canadian Army Cadets =

- Cadets de l'Armée Royale du Canada (French)
- Badge of the RCAC
- Active: 1861 – 1879 (as Drill Associations); July 25, 1879 – present
- Country: Canada
- Type: Youth cadets organization
- Size: 400 Corps (over 20,000 cadets as of 2025)
- Part of: Canadian Cadet Organizations Department of National Defence (Canada)
- Headquarters: Ottawa, Canada
- Patron: Army Cadet League of Canada
- Mottos: Acer Acerpori (As the Maple, so the Sapling)
- March: "Cadet"
- Website: https://www.cadets.ca

Commanders
- Commander: Brigadier-General Jason Langelier
- Formation Chief Warrant Officer: Chief Warrant Officer Alex Arndt

Insignia
- Ensign

The Royal Canadian Army Cadets (RCAC; French: Cadets royaux de l'Armée canadienne) is a national Canadian youth program sponsored by the Canadian Armed Forces and the civilian Army Cadet League of Canada. Under the authority of the National Defence Act, the program is administered by the Canadian Armed Forces and funded through the Department of National Defence. Additionally, the civilian partner of the Royal Canadian Army Cadets, the Army Cadet League of Canada, also ensures financial, accommodations and transportation support for RCAC programs and services at a community level.

Many Royal Canadian Army Cadet corps receive logistical assistance and administrative support from their affiliated Regular Force or Reserve Force unit.

While cadets may wear the badges and accoutrements of their affiliated unit, cadets are not members of the Canadian Armed Forces.

With roots in the early drill associations authorized in 1861, Royal Canadian Army Cadets is Canada's oldest youth program.

As of 2026, there are approximately 22,000 army cadets in about 429 corps which are spread across the country.

Together with the Royal Canadian Sea Cadets and Royal Canadian Air Cadets, it forms the largest federally funded youth program which are known as the Canadian Cadet Organizations.

Members of the Royal Canadian Army Cadets are encouraged to become active and responsible members of their communities.

The Royal Canadian Army Cadets are the rough equivalent to the Junior Reserve Officers' Training Corps in the United States, the Army Cadet Force in the United Kingdom and the Australian Army Cadets in Australia.

== Overview ==
Along with the Royal Canadian Sea Cadets and Royal Canadian Air Cadets, the Royal Canadian Army Cadets are a part of the Canadian Cadet Organizations.

The Royal Canadian Army Cadets and other cadet branches are generally administered by the Reserve Force of the Canadian Armed Forces and are federally funded through the Department of National Defence. Additionally, the program is run in partnership with the civilian Army Cadet League of Canada, which provides supervision of the local corps and squadron sponsors which support the program at the community level. The Army Cadet League of Canada ensures financial, accommodations and transportation support for programs and services not provided by the Department of National Defence.

Cadets are not members of the Canadian Armed Forces, and there is no expectation to join the military at a later date. However, former Cadets who do decide to go on to join the military may find that there are certain benefits to be found within the military in certain areas such as basic training (BMQ, BMQ-L and occupation specific training). The service records for members of the Royal Canadian Army Cadets, which are usually digitally created but sometimes physically made, are not destroyed until the age of twenty five. These service records may be very helpful as a reference for future military service.

In keeping with Commonwealth custom, the Royal Canadian Army Cadets stand second in the order of precedence, after the Royal Canadian Sea Cadets and before the Royal Canadian Air Cadets.

Youths of any country of origin, nationality and citizenship can join the Royal Canadian Army Cadets, provided that they are 12 to 18 years of age. There is no enrolment fee to join a Royal Canadian Army Cadet Corps. Some local sponsors request a voluntary registration fee to assist with expenses not covered by the Canadian Forces such as hall rental. Uniforms, training manuals, and instruction are provided. If a cadet remains in a corps until the day prior to their 19th birthday, then they may be "aged out" following a special ceremony which happens during their final parade night. For example a Cadet Regimental Sergeant Major who is departing a corps will relinquish the senior position by passing on the drill cane or the corps flag to their successor. Upon departing the Royal Canadian Army Cadets, most of the items (specifically personal kit) issued to them during their time in the program must be returned.

The organization and rank system of the Canadian Army is used. Cadets are appointed to non-commissioned member ranks and take seniority amongst themselves. A few large school-sponsored cadet corps use Canadian Army commissioned officer designations from Lieutenant to Lieutenant Colonel, a practice that is not officially recognized.

Adult leadership is provided by members of the Canadian Forces Reserve sub-component which is known as the Cadet Organization Administration and Training Service, which is composed mostly of officers of the Cadet Instructor Cadre (CIC) branch. The leadership of each individual corps is supplemented, if necessary, by contracted Civilian Instructors (CIs), authorized adult volunteers, and, on occasion, officers and non-commissioned members of other Canadian Armed Forces branches. The CIC branch is specifically trained to administer and support the Royal Canadian Sea, Army, and Air Cadet training program. Like all other Reserve Force members, they come from all walks of life and all parts of local communities. Some commissioned CIC officers are former cadets themselves, while others may have former Regular Force or Reserve Force service.

=== Aim ===
The aim of the Royal Canadian Army Cadets is "to develop in youth the attributes of good citizenship and leadership; promote physical fitness; and stimulate the interest of youth in the sea, land, and air activities of the Canadian Forces." The Royal Canadian Army Cadets shares this aim with the Sea and Air Cadets; however, each focuses on its own element.

=== RCAC Badge ===
The badge of the Royal Canadian Army Cadets is the official emblem of the Royal Canadian Army Cadets. It is worn on the upper sleeve of the cadet uniform and on the breast of the issue parkas. It is also worn as a brass or cloth cap badge in place of an affiliated unit badge or for non-affiliated corps. The motto of Acer Acerpori is Latin for "as the maple, so the sapling".

== History ==
=== Early history ===
The Royal Canadian Army Cadets (RCAC) can trace its history to the creation of drill associations or militia companies in 1861, predating Canadian Confederation by six years. These early militia companies and drill associations were not cadet corps but were militia sub-units formed in educational and other public institutions. Enrolment was limited to men between the ages of 13 and 60. The drill was not only a parade square and discipline exercise, but a skill that was necessary for the defence of the Colony. The American Civil War and the threat of the Fenian Raids motivated their creation in Canada East and Canada West.

In 1866, when the Fenians threatened Ontario, the Upper Canada College Rifle Company was called to active service, along with its parent regiment. While the regiment marched to Ridgeway to confront the Fenian invaders, the UCC Rifle Company guarded the port, armouries and government buildings of Toronto. For this deed, the student company proudly carried the battle honour "FENIAN RAID 1865-66" on its drums and colours from that day forward. Students in the battalion who stood guard also were entitled to receive the Canadian General Service Medal, with their names inscribed on the medal's edge and the "Fenian Raid 1866" bar on its red and white striped ribbon.

Trinity College Volunteer Rifle Company was formed on June 1, 1861 in Port Hope, Ontario. Bishop's College Drill Association was formed in Lennoxville, Quebec, on December 6, 1861. Another 14 of the early "Drill Associations" or "Rifle Companies" stood up in Ontario and Quebec. Canada's oldest continuously-active cadet corps is No. 2 Bishop's College School Cadet Corps in Lennoxville, Quebec (Nov. 1879), and No. 7 Royal Canadian Army Cadets in St. Thomas, Ontario (Feb. 1880), both having roots firmly in the previous drill associations.

In 1904, the allocation of numbers to cadet corps was instituted and the Quarterly Militia List, correct to April 1, 1904, lists Cadet Organizations from 1 to 104. The earliest date of organization shown is November 28, 1879, four months after Militia General Order 18 of July 25, 1879 allowed the formations of 74 "Associations for Drill in Educational Institutions" for young men. These cadets were taught drill and marksmanship, but were not required to be employed in active service. The 74 associations included 34 in Ontario, 24 in Québec, 13 in the Maritimes, two in Manitoba, and one in British Columbia.

The origin of the term "cadet corps" is debatable, as some believe it was first used in 1898, in Ontario, bundled in a provision that the corps' instructors would be members of the local school teaching staff, and not from the local militia unit.

=== Public support ===
Increased support, motivated in part by the Northwest Campaign during the Riel Rebellion of 1885, allowed improved issue of uniforms, weapons and other equipment to schools providing military training.

=== Cadet Instructor Cadre ===
The first authority for cadet instructors to hold rank in the Militia was established by Special General Order Oct. 21, 1903. The appointment was 2nd Lieutenant and the officer was permitted to retain the rank only as long as he remained an instructor and the cadet corps remained efficient. This followed the High School Cadet Instructor's Certificate, established in 1898 through the Canadian Militia.

On May 1, 1909 a cadre of commissioned officers, as a Corps of School Cadet Instructors was established. It was composed of qualified male school teachers. On May 1, 1921 the Corps was reorganized on Jan 1, 1924 and designated the Cadet Services of Canada. It was a component of the Canadian Army Non-Permanent Active Militia and the forerunner of the current Cadet Instructor Cadre.

With the integration of the Canadian Armed Forces in 1968, the officer cadre was designated as the Cadet Instructors List, a sub-component of the Reserve Force of the Canadian Armed Forces.

In July 1994, it was re-named to the Cadet Instructor Cadre.

In 2009, the Reserve Force sub-component was re-named to the Cadet Organization Administration and Training Service and includes the CIC Branch and former members of the Primary Reserve and Regular Force who retain their previous branch affiliation while serving the Cadet Organization.

==== Strathcona Trust ====
In 1910, Sir Donald Alexander Smith, Lord Strathcona, the Canadian High Commissioner to Britain, created a trust with the Dominion Government with a sum of $500,000, with the aim of inspiring citizenship and patriotism. through physical training, rifle shooting, and military drill. He is remembered today with the Lord Strathcona Medal, which is awarded to a cadet in each corps and squadron who best exemplifies the qualities of being a cadet.

=== World Wars ===
Approximately 40,000 former cadets served in His Majesty's forces during the First World War. By the end of the war, there were approximately 64,000 boys enrolled in army cadet corps across Canada.

During the twenty years following the First World War, cadet training came to a standstill. Many corps survived these hard times, but the Great Depression and the lack of public interest caused the cancellation of the uniform grant for army cadets in 1931. The instructional grant for 12 and 13 year olds was additionally cancelled in 1934. In Alberta, only a couple of corps functioned beyond 1934.

The beginning of the Second World War brought a renewed public interest in cadet training. Many cadet corps were raised in high schools across the country.

=== Post-war years ===
In 1942, in recognition of the significant contribution of former cadets to the ongoing war effort, His Majesty King George VI granted the "Royal" prefix to the Canadian Army Cadets, giving it the title of the Royal Canadian Army Cadets. The Royal prefix was also afforded Sea at the same time. Air cadets were given the Royal prefix in 1953 by Her Majesty Queen Elizabeth II.

It is estimated that nearly 230,000 former army cadets served in His Majesty's forces during the Second World War.

After 1945, quotas were imposed, which ended up reducing Canada's total cadet membership to approximately 75,000 members. Many of the closed corps, those with membership restricted to boys in one particular school, were disbanded; some of them became open corps, training in Militia armouries or in Legion halls; others acquired their own buildings.

The Korean War stimulated growth among open corps in the early 1950s. Many school corps moved to armouries and drill halls. Regular Force members, many who had served in Korea staffed the Area Cadet Offices that managed the corps and the summer camps.

=== Unification of the Canadian Forces ===
Following the unification of the Canadian Forces in 1968, a number of changes occurred in the Army Cadet world:

- QR&O (Cadets) brought Sea and Air Cadet commissioned officers under the single service control of the Canadian Forces and standardized the three Cadet Organizations.
- A directorate of cadets was established in Ottawa, at the Department of National Defence headquarters, to set policy and co-ordinate the activities of the Sea, Army and Air Cadet Organizations.
- The Army Cadet League of Canada was formed in 1971 to provide the Royal Canadian Army Cadets with the same civilian and Canadian Armed Forces partnership structure that was enjoyed by Sea Cadets and Air Cadets through the long established Navy League and the Air Cadet League.
- Officers of the Cadet Services of Canada, The Royal Canadian Sea Cadets and former Royal Canadian Air Force Reserve Cadet Instructors were consolidated in the Cadet Instructor List, which was redesignated the Cadet Instructor Cadre in July 1994.
- The Army Cadet League's Arms, Supporters, Flag and Badge were registered with the Canadian Heraldic Authority on March 31. 1995

=== Females in the cadet program ===
Females were unofficial participants in cadet training almost from the very beginning of cadets.

Shortly after the Highland Cadet Corps was formed at the Guelph Grammar School at Guelph in 1882, an all-female cadet company called the Daughters of the Regiment were started. The Canadian Army provided no support for training or uniforms for the all-female cadet company. In addition, females were prohibited from attending summer training at camps.

On July 30, 1975, the Parliament of Canada amended the relevant legislation by changing the word "boys" to "persons", therefore permitting females to become members of the Royal Canadian Army Cadets. Therefore, females became full participants in the cadet branch. The biggest change was during the summer training program: what had been for many decades an exclusively male environment changed dramatically at local corps and at Army Cadet Summer Training Centres. Today, males and females are given equality of opportunity as it relates to participating in any and all Royal Canadian Army Cadet corps-level functions.

=== 2004 – 125th anniversary ===
2004 marked the 125th anniversary of the Royal Canadian Army Cadets. The Army Cadet League of Canada issued a 125th Anniversary pin to be worn by all 25,000+ army cadets across the country at the time. Canada Post honoured the cadets with a stamp which was unveiled in Ottawa in March 2004. Many parades honouring the century-and-a-quarter of cadets occurred across Canada: there were Freedom of the City parades in Vernon, Oromocto and Calgary as well as other major cities and towns across the country. The original Royal Banner was laid up in Vernon during the final battalion parade on August 19 at the Army Cadet Summer Training Centre, and the new Royal Banner was paraded in front of 1,500 cadets and 2,000 members of the audience.

== RCAC Training ==
=== Optional Training ===
In the cadet program there are several optional training programs which consist of:

- Military Band and Pipes Band
- Marksmanship
- Biathlon
- First Aid Program
- Drill Team
- Orienteering
- Rappelling
- Parachuting

This optional training is an extension of the mandatory training that cadets receive within their individual corps.

=== Star Level Program ===
The Star Level Program is the main training program carried out by all Royal Canadian Army Cadet corps within Canada. This program is mandated by the Department of National Defence and specifically through the Directorate of Cadets & Junior Rangers.

The Star Level Program is composed of five levels:

- Green Star (Level 1)
- Red Star (Level 2)
- Silver Star (Level 3)
- Gold Star (Level 4)
- Master Cadet (Level 5) - Removed in September 2024 and replaced by the Advanced Leadership Program (ALP)

Starting in the 2012-13 training year, the National Star of Excellence or NSE replaced the National Star Certification Examination or NSCE as a ranking tool for Senior Cadets. Year 5 of LHQ training was also introduced as "Master Cadet" consisting of a great deal of On the Job Training (OJT) and self-led professional development opportunities. As of August 4, 2023, the National Star of Excellence program has been phased out.

Cadets are taught a variety of subjects, known as Performance Objectives (PO) that include: citizenship, physical fitness, healthy living, drill, marksmanship, map and compass, outdoor survival, eco-friendly camping and military history and traditions. While most POs are identical with only details varying between star levels, many POs are exclusive to each star levels.

Comparison of Performance Objectives (POs) by star level
Level	Leadership	Drill	Outdoor Skills	Instruction	Biathlon	Special Features
Green Star	PO 103	PO 108	PO 121, PO 122, PO 123	None	PO 111	PSRY focus
Red Star	PO 203	PO 208	PO 221, PO 222, PO 223, PO 224	None	PO 211	Trekking; actions when lost
Silver Star	PO 303	PO 308	PO 321, PO 322, PO 324, PO 325, PO 326	PO 309	PO 311 (Optional)	Instruction begins; outdoor leadership; expedition
Gold Star	PO 403	PO 408	PO 421, PO 422, PO 424, PO 425, PO 426	PO 409	PO 411	Senior expedition skills; PSRY revisited
Master Cadet	PO 503	None	PO 521, PO 522, PO 525	PO 509, PO 513, PO 514	None (Biathlon still available but not a PO)	Global citizenship; advanced mapping; Army career prep

=== Summer Training ===
Cadet Summer Training is a core program of the Royal Canadian Army Cadets that provides cadets with intensive summer courses at Cadet Training Centres across Canada. Training is divided into areas such as drill and ceremonial, expedition and outdoor skills, marksmanship, fitness and sports, and musicianship. Cadets progress through courses based on their Star level, with Red Star cadets eligible for introductory summer courses, and Silver, Gold, and Master Cadets taking advanced courses such as instructional programs, leadership expeditions, and staff cadet employment. Green Star cadets are not eligible for summer training and have to wait until the summer of their Red Star year.

==== Summer Training Courses ====
Summer Training Courses are as follows:

Course Category	Red Star	Silver Star	Gold Star	Master Cadet
Drill and Ceremonial	Introduction to Drill and Ceremonial	Drill and Ceremonial Instructor Course		
Expedition	Expedition Team Member Course		Expedition Team Leader Course	
Expedition	Expedition Team Member Course		Mountain Bike Instructor Course	
Fitness and Sports	Introduction to Fitness and Sports	Fitness and Sports Instructor Course		
Musicianship	Introduction to Military Band	Military Band Musician Course		
Musicianship	Introduction to Pipe Band	Pipe Band Musician Course		
Marksmanship	Introduction to Marksmanship	Air Rifle Marksmanship Instructor Course		
Staff Cadet	N/A	Staff Cadet Employment		
National Opportunities	N/A	National Cadet Advisory Council (NCAC)		
National Opportunities	N/A		Canadian Forces Basic Parachutist Course (Note: There is a fitness prerequisite for the Basic Parachutist Course. Cadets must be cleared by a CF medical officer and be able to do 31 sit-ups, 7 chin-ups, and run 1.6 km in less than 7 minutes and 30 seconds.)	

==== Cadet Training Centres ====
During the cadets' summer off-season, some members of the RCAC attend various Cadet Summer Training Centres, for which they are selected several months in advance. As of 2027, the active CTCs include:

- Argonaut Cadet Training Centre, located at CFB Gagetown, NB
- Atlantic Cadet Training Centre, location TBD
- Bagotville Cadet Training Centre, located at CFB Bagotville, QC
- Blackdown Cadet Training Centre, located at CFB Borden, ON
- Cold Lake Cadet Training Centre, located at CFB Cold Lake, AB
- Gimli Cadet Training Centre, located at RCAF Station Gimli, MB
- Greenwood Cadet Training Centre, located at CFB Greenwood, NS
- HMCS Ontario CTC, located at Kingston, ON
- HMCS Quadra CTC, located in Comox, BC
- Rocky Mountain Cadet Training Centre, located near Cochrane, AB
- STEM Cadet Training Centre, location TBD
- St-Jean Cadet Training Centre, located in Saint-Jean-sur-Richelieu, QC
- Trenton Cadet Training Centre, located at CFB Trenton, ON
- Valcartier Cadet Training Centre, located at CFB Valcartier, QC
- Vernon Cadet Training Centre, located in Vernon, BC
- Whitehorse Cadet Training Centre, located in Whitehorse, YT

== Uniform ==
All cadets are issued uniform items for ceremonial and routine training occurrences. Uniforms are provided at no cost to the cadet. Cadets are responsible for care, cleaning and custody of the issued kit and must return it once they are no longer a cadet.

=== Distinctive Elemental Uniform (DEU) ===
Used on ceremonial and formal occasions. All army cadets are issued a Beret of the colour of their branch (Majority being dark green), dark green jacket (tunic) with a belt, short-sleeved light green collared shirt, black necktie, green trousers, black web belt with a gold-brass buckle, grey wool socks, and polishable black leather boots. Cadets are also issued a plastic name tag with their last name on it, slip-on ranks, and stand-alone rank insignia which are sewn onto the tunic.

There are a number of authorized accoutrements with the DEU, including white cotton gloves, a white lanyard, and a white nylon belt. These are issued to those cadets in notable positions during parade nights (called "parade positions"). The white lanyard is worn around the left shoulder, and the white nylon belt is worn in place of the standard-issue fabric tunic belt. The white nylon belt comes with a gold-brass buckle stamped with the insignia of the Canadian Armed Forces. Cadets who have been given medals or other awards through the cadet program wear these decorations with the DEU.

Cadets with religious beliefs that require modifications to the uniform, such as those of the Sikh faith, may wear a turban in place of the standard-issue wedge cap.

==== Highland Dress ====
Highland dress is a special order of dress reserved exclusively for those cadets who are pipe band musicians at their corps. Pipe band musicians are issued a Glengarry headdress, a kilt woven with the army cadet tartan, two sporrans (one hair, one leather), hosetops, and white spats. Various accoutrements to the highland dress include a drum major's sash, a leopard skin worn on the front of the uniform like an apron, and a sgian-dubh. Only bass and tenor drummers are authorized to wear the leopard skin, and only Pipe Majors are authorized to carry the sgian-dubh.

=== Field Training Uniform (FTU) ===
For their day-to-day training dress (Field Training Uniform (FTU), cadets are issued a rifle green/dark green/maroon (depending on the branch) beret and a cap badge of the branch fitted in, green elemental tee shirt, olive green tunic, olive green pants, and black multi-purpose boots (Canadian MKIII combat boots or Swat boots). The black web belt from the DEU is worn with the FTU pants. Cadets may also be issued an olive green name tape with their last name in dark green lettering, similar in style to those of the Canadian Armed Forces, which is sewn on the FTU tunic.

=== Cold weather uniform items ===
Cadets will be issued a number of uniform items to be worn in instances of cold weather, including an all-season coat, black winter gloves, and a blue toque. Cadets may wear these items "when weather conditions dictate". The all-season coat comes with a liner and an exterior coat.

=== Numbered orders of dress ===
All cadet uniform items are worn in accordance with the numbered orders of dress. All orders of dress may be worn with cold weather uniform items.

Army Cadet Numbered Orders of Dress
Name	Number	Description
Ceremonial Dress	C1	Cadets wear all items of the Distinctive Elemental Uniform. This uniform is worn on formal occasions, such as Commanding Officer (CO)'s parades, the Annual Ceremonial Review (ACR), parading guards of honour, and church services. All decorations a cadet has been awarded are worn with this uniform,
Ceremonial Dress	C1H	Same as C1, but with highland dress.
Mess Dress	C2	Cadets wear all items of the Distinctive Elemental Uniform, with no headdress, ribbons replacing medals, and a black bowtie replacing the necktie. This order of dress is optional, worn during mess dinners or other occasions as ordered.
Mess Dress	C2H	Same as C2, but with the highland dress.
Service Dress	C3	Cadets wear all items of the Distinctive Elemental Uniform with or without the tunic (as weather conditions dictate). This uniform is occasionally worn for day-to-day training.
Service Dress	C3A	Same as C3, but the top button of the shirt is undone and the necktie removed.
Service Dress	C3B	Same as C3A, but in place of the shirt, cadets wear a long sleeve elemental shirt. This is worn at the discretion of the corp CO.
Service Dress	C3C	Cadets wear all items of the Distinctive Elemental Uniform, with the green elemental t-shirt in place of the collared light green shirt. Decorations and name tags are not worn on the elemental t-shirt. This is worn when cadets are travelling to/from Cadet Training Centres, but may be worn at the discretion of the corps CO.
Training Dress	C5	Cadets wear all items of the Field Training Uniform. This uniform is worn for routine corp training.
Training Dress	C5A	Same a C5, worn without the tunic.
Training Dress	C5C	Cadets wear their Elemental Uniform, with their issued PT (Physical Training) shorts and their issued Tilley.

== Ranks ==
Note: Cadet insignia are distinguished from their Canadian Armed Forces counterparts through the inclusion of "CADET" written at the bottom of the slip-on (not shown below).

Senior Cadet Ranks (Sgt-CWO)			Prerequisites*
CDT 8	Cadet Chief Warrant Officer (CWO) adjudant-chef (adjuc)	A simplified version of the 1957 Coat of Arms of Canada.	In order to earn a promotion to Chief Warrant Officer (CWO), a cadet must: Complete at least six months of service at the rank of Master Warrant Officer; Complete Master Cadet training; Hold a leadership position within the corps; Be recommended by the appropriate Platoon Officer; Be recommended by a Merit Review Board; and; Be a member of a corps large enough to be allotted its one CWO position and in which that position is vacant, except in the case of a transfer or transfers from other squadrons.; Upon promotion to CWO, the cadet is henceforth known as the "Regimental Sergeant Major" (RSM) of their corps. Promotion to CWO may be considered the pinnacle of an Army Cadet's service.
CDT 7	Cadet Master Warrant Officer (MWO) adjudant-maître (adjum)	St. Edward's Crown within a laurel wreath.	In order to earn a promotion to Master Warrant Officer (MWO), a cadet must: Complete at least six months of service at the rank of Warrant Officer; Achieve a minimum of “completed without difficulty” in PO 503 (Leadership); Hold a leadership position within the corps; Be recommended by a Merit Review Board; and; Be recommended by the appropriate Platoon Officer.
CDT 6	Cadet Warrant Officer (WO) adjudant (adj)	St Edward's Crown	In order to earn a promotion to Warrant Officer (WO), a cadet must: Complete at least six months of service at the rank of Sergeant; Successfully complete Gold Star training; Hold a leadership position within the corps; and; Be recommended by the appropriate Platoon Officer.
CDT 5	Cadet Sargeant (Sgt) sergent (sgt)	Three chevrons surmounted by a maple leaf	In order to earn a promotion to Sargeant (Sgt), a Cadet must: Completed at least six months of service at the rank of Master Corporal; Successfully completed Silver Star training; and; Be recommended by the appropriate Platoon Officer.
Junior Cadet Ranks (Cdt-MCpl)			Prerequisites*
CDT 4	Cadet Master Corporal (MCpl) caporal-chef (cplc)	Two chevrons surmounted by a maple leaf.	In order to earn a promotion to Master Corporal (MCpl) a cadet must: Complete at least six months of service at the rank of Corporal; Successfully complete Red Star training; and; Be recommended by the appropriate Platoon Officer.
CDT 3	Cadet Corporal (Cpl) caporal (cpl)	Two chevrons.	In order to earn a promotion to Corporal (Cpl), a cadet must: Hold the rank of Lance-Corporal; Successfully complete Green Star training; and; Be recommended by the appropriate Platoon Officer.
CDT 2	Cadet Lance-Corporal^ (LCpl) Lance-Caporal (LCpl)	One chevron.	In order to earn a promotion to Lance-Corporal, a cadet must: Participate in the Green Star training program for a minimum period of five months; and; Be recommended by the appropriate Platoon Officer.
CDT 1	Cadet (Cdt) cadet (cdt)	No insignia.	Granted upon enrollment.; No prerequisites for this rank, except a minimum age of 12 years and a maximum age of 18 years.

*Individual corps may have their own local requirements for promotions, in addition to the national standards (shown above).

^"CJCR Gp Dress instructions, Annex B Rank Insignia". www.canada.ca. 2023-05-23.

If an Army Cadet Corps has an affiliation with a unit of the Canadian Army that traditionally has different titles for the Ranks of "Lance-Corporal", "Corporal", and "Master Corporal", then they are then entitled to make use of those alternative titles for the ranks of "Lance-Corporal", "Corporal, and "Master Corporal" in their units as well.

Branch	Master Corporal	Corporal	Lance-Corporal
Royal Canadian Armoured Corps	Master Corporal / caporal-chef (MCpl / cplc)	Corporal / caporal (Cpl / cpl)	Trooper / cavalier (Tpr / cav)
Royal Regiment of Canadian Artillery	Master Bombardier / bombardier-chef (MBdr / bdrc)	Bombardier / bombardier (Bdr / bdr)	Gunner / artilleur (Gnr / artr)
Corps of Royal Canadian Engineers	Master Corporal / caporal-chef (MCpl / cplc)	Corporal / caporal (Cpl / cpl)	Sapper / sapeur (Spr / spr)
Royal Canadian Corps of Signals	Master Corporal / caporal-chef (MCpl / cplc)	Corporal / caporal (Cpl / cpl)	Signalman / signaleur (Sgmn /[sig)
Corps of Royal Canadian Electrical and Mechanical Engineers	Master Corporal / caporal-chef (MCpl / cplc)	Corporal / caporal (Cpl / cpl)	Craftsman / artisan (Cfm / artn)
Royal Canadian Infantry Corps (RCIC) members of guards regiments	Master Corporal / caporal-chef (MCpl / cplc)	Corporal / caporal (Cpl / cpl)	Guardsman / garde (Gdm / gde)
RCIC members of rifle regiments	Master Corporal / caporal-chef (MCpl / cplc)	Corporal / caporal (Cpl / cpl)	Rifleman / carabinier (Rfm / car)
RCIC members of fusilier regiments	Master Corporal / caporal-chef (MCpl / cplc)	Corporal / caporal (Cpl / cpl)	Fusilier / fusilier (Fus / fus)
Highland (Scottish) Regiment	Master Corporal / caporal-chef (MCpl / cplc)	Corporal / caporal (Cpl / cpl)	Highlander / montagnarde (Hldr / mon)
RCIC members of voltigeur regiment	Master Corporal / caporal-chef (MCpl / cplc)	Corporal / caporal (Cpl / cpl)	Voltigeur / voltigeur (Vol / vol)

In the guard regiments, Cadet Warrant Officers are known as "Colour Sergeants"

== Music appointments ==
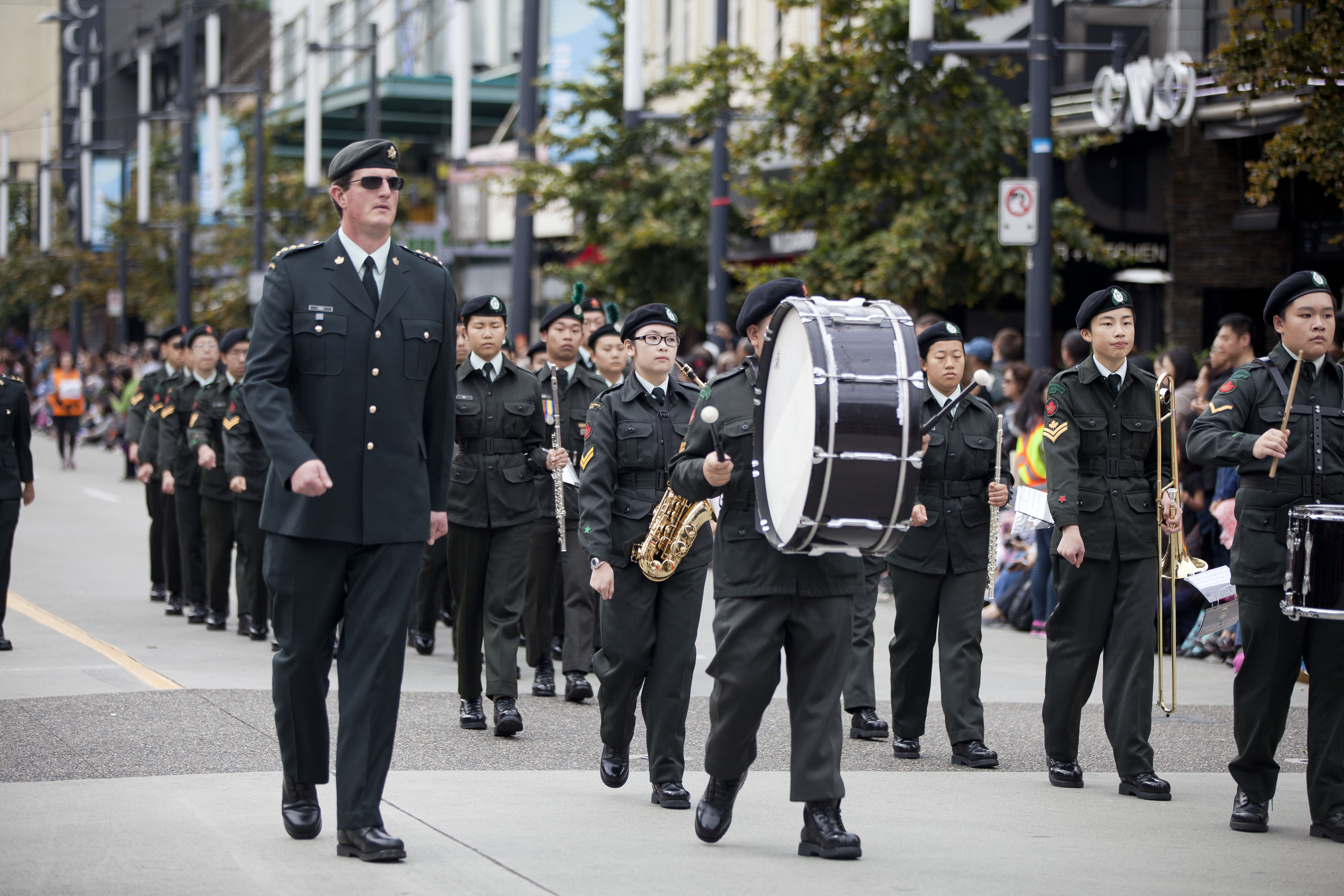
2472 RCACC band at the 2014 Vancouver Halloween Parade & Expo

When a corps wishes to create a cadet band, the decision to do so must be made in consultation with the sponsoring committee responsible for provision and maintenance of musical instruments. The cadet music program recognizes two types of bands: military bands and pipe bands. Military bands' instrumentation includes woodwinds, brass, and/or percussion, while pipe bands' instrumentation includes pipes and drums. The Regional Support Cadet Unit should provide instruments on loan to their corps to maximize the use of the instruments held by the region and CSTCs and to better support corps training. The music proficiency levels are recognized on the cadet uniform using a system of badges based on the music training programs; the military band badge represents a lyre, while the pipe band badge represents either a pipe or a drum, depending on the instrument played.

The appointment of a Drum Major or Pipe Major is at the discretion of the corps' CO. Requirements considered include: demonstration of skills and knowledge in band drill, commands and formations, qualification of Music Proficiency Level 2, and holds the minimum rank of Master Corporal. Only one cadet may be appointed as the corps' Drum Major or Pipe Major at any time.

Music Appointments
Drum Major	Pipe Major
Appointed at the discretion of the Corps Commanding Officer; Demonstrates skills and knowledge in band drill, commands and formations; Qualified Music Proficiency Level 2; Holds the minimum rank of Master Corporal; Badge is removed when cadet no longer fills the appointment; Worn on lower sleeve. (Between elbow and wrist).; Only one cadet in a corps can be appointed Drum Major	Appointed at the discretion of the Corps Commanding Officer; Demonstrates skills and knowledge in band drill, commands and formations; Qualified Music Proficiency Level 2; Holds the minimum rank of Master Corporal; Badge is removed when cadet no longer fills the appointment; Worn on lower sleeve (between elbow and wrist).; Only one cadet in a corps can be appointed Pipe Major

== Honours and awards ==
The Canadian Cadet Movement maintains its own Honours and Awards system. Cadets may be awarded these based on criteria including bravery, citizenship, service, outstanding performance on a summer training course, and more. In addition, cadets may also wear, on their uniform, any orders, decorations, and medals of Canada they have been awarded.

Within the system, there are several honours and awards common to all three cadet elements and some that are unique to each. A cadet who transfers from one element to another may continue to wear any medals awarded from their previous service, but in general, army cadets may be eligible for the following eight honours and awards, and are in the order of precedence:

Medal	Description
Cadet Medal of Bravery	The Cadet Medal of Bravery may be awarded to a cadet who performs an outstanding deed of valour involving risk of life in attempting to save the life or property of others. One Gold Star is issued with this medal as a form of posthumous recognition, to Cadets who lose their lives during their deed of valour.
Lord Strathcona Trust Fund Medal	The Lord Strathcona Trust Fund Medal, most commonly referred to as the Lord Strathcona Medal is the highest award, which can be bestowed upon a cadet in recognition of exemplary performance in physical and military training. This award is given out to one Cadet, in every cadet corps across Canada per year.
Royal Canadian Legion Cadet Medal of Excellence	The Royal Canadian Legion (RCL) Cadet Medal of Excellence is awarded in recognition for individual endeavours in citizenship that meet or enhance the aims and objectives of the cadet movement. This award is given out to one Cadet, in every cadet corps across Canada per year.
Army Cadet Medal of Merit	The Army Cadet Medal of Merit is awarded once to a cadet and includes one of four corresponding award bars: Rodger Bar — Outstanding Silver Star cadets; Howard Bar — Outstanding Gold Star cadets; President’s Bar — Outstanding Advanced Leadership Program cadets selected by Branch; Walsh Bar — Canada’s Outstanding Army Cadet.
Army, Navy and Air Force Veterans in Canada Cadet Medal of Merit	The Army, Navy and Air Force Veterans in Canada (ANAVETS), as a legacy to its desire to promote excellence and awareness of the CCO, has established the Army, Navy and Air Force Veterans in Canada Cadet Medal of Merit. One medal shall be awarded at each CTC to the top cadet, male or female, for each Instructor level course.
Order of St. George Medal	Awarded to the top Staff Cadet(s) at each CSTC.
Army Cadet Service Medal	This medal is presented to an Army Cadet that has successfully completed four years of honourable service within the Canadian cadet program. Single bars are awarded for each additional year for a maximum of two bars should a cadet have joined on their 12th birthday.
Colonel Robert Perron Award	The Colonel Robert Perron Award for Excellence in Physical Fitness is a national award that is presented annually to the top male and female cadets who demonstrate the best physical fitness.
Cadet Certificate of Commendation	Awarded for outstanding deeds in attempting to save the life or property of another person. This award is not part of the order of precedence.

== See also ==
- Cadets (youth program)
- Canadian Cadet Organizations
- Royal Canadian Air Cadets
- Royal Canadian Sea Cadets
- Canadian Armed Forces
- Cadets Canada elemental ranks
