= ACLC =

ACLC may refer to:

- Alachua County Labor Coalition
- Alameda Community Learning Center, Alameda, California
- AMA Computer Learning Center (now ACLC College), part of AMA University, Philippines
- American Clergy Leadership Conference
- Army Cadet League of Canada
- Association Canadienne des Libertés Civiles, the Québécois name of the Canadian Civil Liberties Association
- Association of Confessional Lutheran Churches, based in the U.S.
