= Supplementary Reserve =

Supplementary Reserve may refer to:

- The Canadian Forces Supplementary Reserve
- A historical subdivision of the Militia of the United Kingdom
- The Supplementary Order of Battle in Canada
