= Canadian Cadet Organizations =

Canadian youth program

- Organisations de cadets du Canada
- Active: 1879–present
- Country: Canada
- Type: Youth Organization
- Size: 1040 corps/squadrons (52000 cadets officially as of November 21st, 2024)
- Part of: Royal Canadian Sea Cadets; Royal Canadian Army Cadets; Royal Canadian Air Cadets
- Website: www.canada.ca/cadets

Commanders
- Commander: Brigadier-General Jason Langelier
- Formation Chief Warrant Officer: Chief Warrant Officer W.A. Arndt

The Canadian Cadet Organizations, marketed under the name of Cadets Canada, is a youth program known as the Royal Canadian Sea Cadets, Royal Canadian Army Cadets, and Royal Canadian Air Cadets. The program is sponsored by and funded by a partnership between the Department of National Defence and the civilian Navy League, the Army Cadet League and the Air Cadet League, as well as local community sponsors that include service organizations and parent sponsoring groups supervised by the Leagues.

== Overview ==
Cadet corps and squadrons exist in communities large and small from coast to coast to coast. Cadets are not members of the Canadian Armed Forces, nor is the program a prerequisite for military service. Adult leadership is provided primarily by the Cadet Organization Administration and Training Service, most of whom are members of the Cadet Instructors Cadre Branch. Members of the Regular Force and Primary Reserve can volunteer to instruct, while there are also civilian instructors and volunteers who have gone through a thorough screening process.

The aim of the program is to "Develop in youth the attributes of good citizenship and leadership; promote physical fitness; and stimulate the interest of youth in the sea, land, and air activities of the Canadian Forces."

All elements of the CCO are under the command of the Commander of the National Cadets and Junior Canadian Rangers Support Group (Ntl CJCR Sp Gp or CJCR).

== History ==
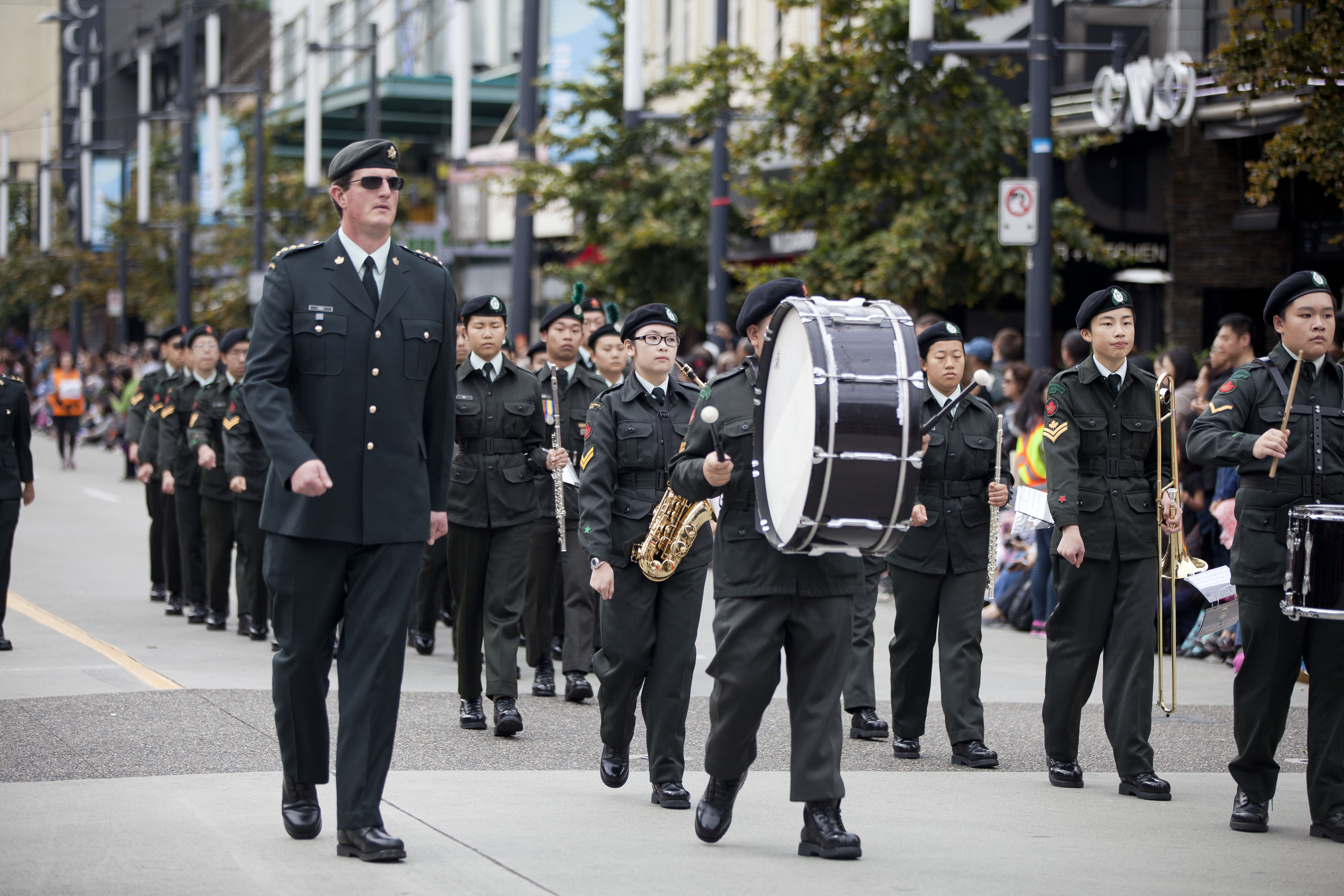
An Army Cadet band during a parade in Vancouver in 2014.

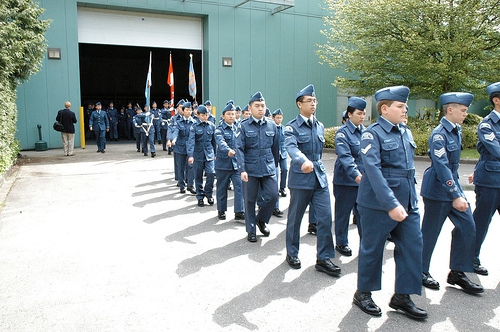
Cadets from 655 Richmond Royal Canadian Air Cadet Squadron marching during their ACR.

In 1862, five years before Confederation, "drill associations" were set up in Canada as a response to the American Civil War. These early drill associations served to train militia and were open to people over the age of 13.

In 1879, the government authorized the creation of 74 "Association[s] for Drill in Educational Institutions", drill associations that were open to male youth over the age of 14 and which did not entail active service in the military. The Riel Rebellion of 1885 motivated increased support to these youth drill associations. By 1887, they were called the cadet corps and were open to boys over the age of 12.

It was not until July 30, 1970 (the result of a change in legislation) that girls were officially permitted to join government-supported cadet corps and squadrons. Until then, girls paraded as "Wrennettes" supported by the Navy League and Air "Cadettes" supported by the Air Cadet League. On rare occasions, girls paraded unofficially with army cadets.

== Musical groups ==
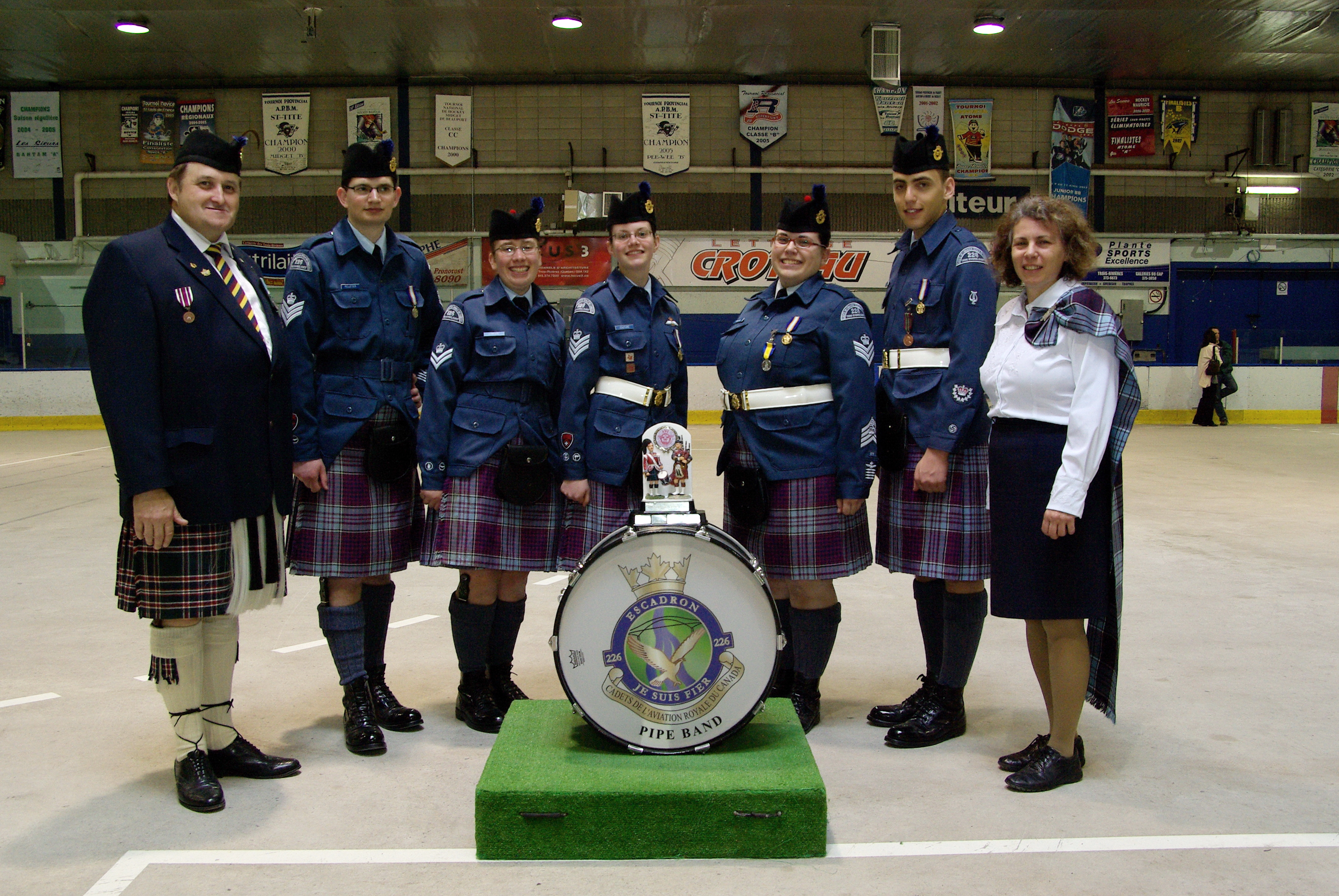
226 Air Cadet Pipeband at their annual review at the Colisée de Trois-Rivières, May 2008.

The three Cadet organizations maintain a number of volunteer bands, typically assisted by members of Canadian military bands in the Regular Force and Primary Reserve.

The bands are primarily staffed by cadets from their respective organizations. The music program of Cadets Canada supports three types of bands: military bands, bugle bands, and pipe bands.

Bands are commanded by a Drum Major, with them acting as the conductor, or having a separate cadet be a conductor.

== See also ==
- Cadets (youth program)
- Royal Canadian Sea Cadets
- Royal Canadian Army Cadets
- Royal Canadian Air Cadets
- Junior Canadian Rangers
- History of the Cadet Instructors Cadre
- JROTC
