= Primary Reserve =

Military reserve of the Canadian Armed Forces

Canadian Forces Primary Reserve
- Première réserve des Forces canadiennes (French)
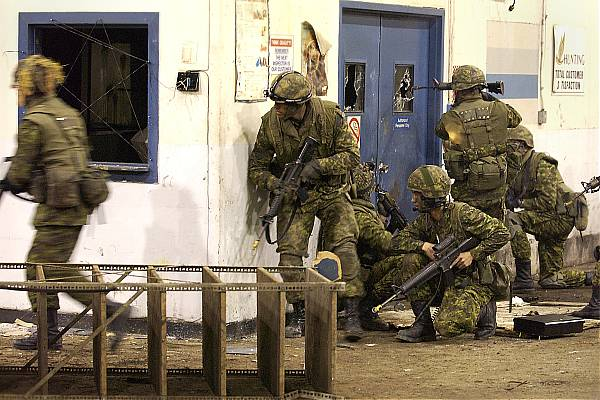
- Reserve infantrymen train in urban operations (c. 2004)
- Active: 19th century – present
- Country: Canada
- Branch: Royal Canadian Navy; Canadian Army; Royal Canadian Air Force
- Type: Reserve forces
- Size: 30,000 authorized
- Part of: Canadian Armed Forces

Commanders
- Chief of Reserves and Employer Support: Major-General R.R.E. (Rob Roy) Mackenzie

The Primary Reserve of the Canadian Armed Forces (French: Première réserve des Forces canadiennes) is the first and largest of the four sub-components of the Canadian Armed Forces reserves, followed by the Supplementary Reserve, the Cadet Organizations Administration and Training Service (formerly the Cadet Instructors Cadre) and the Canadian Rangers.

The reserve force is represented, though not commanded, at the national level by the chief of reserves and employer support. This is usually a major-general or rear-admiral.

The Primary Reserve consists of sailors, soldiers, and aviators who may augment or operate alongside their Regular Force counterparts. Each reserve force is operationally and administratively responsible to its corresponding environmental command; those being the Royal Canadian Navy, the Canadian Army and the Royal Canadian Air Force.

Primary reservists number approximately 27,000 (all ranks, all services). The reserves are important to sustaining CF operations, particularly following the defence budget cuts of the 90s.

== Components ==
=== Naval Reserve ===
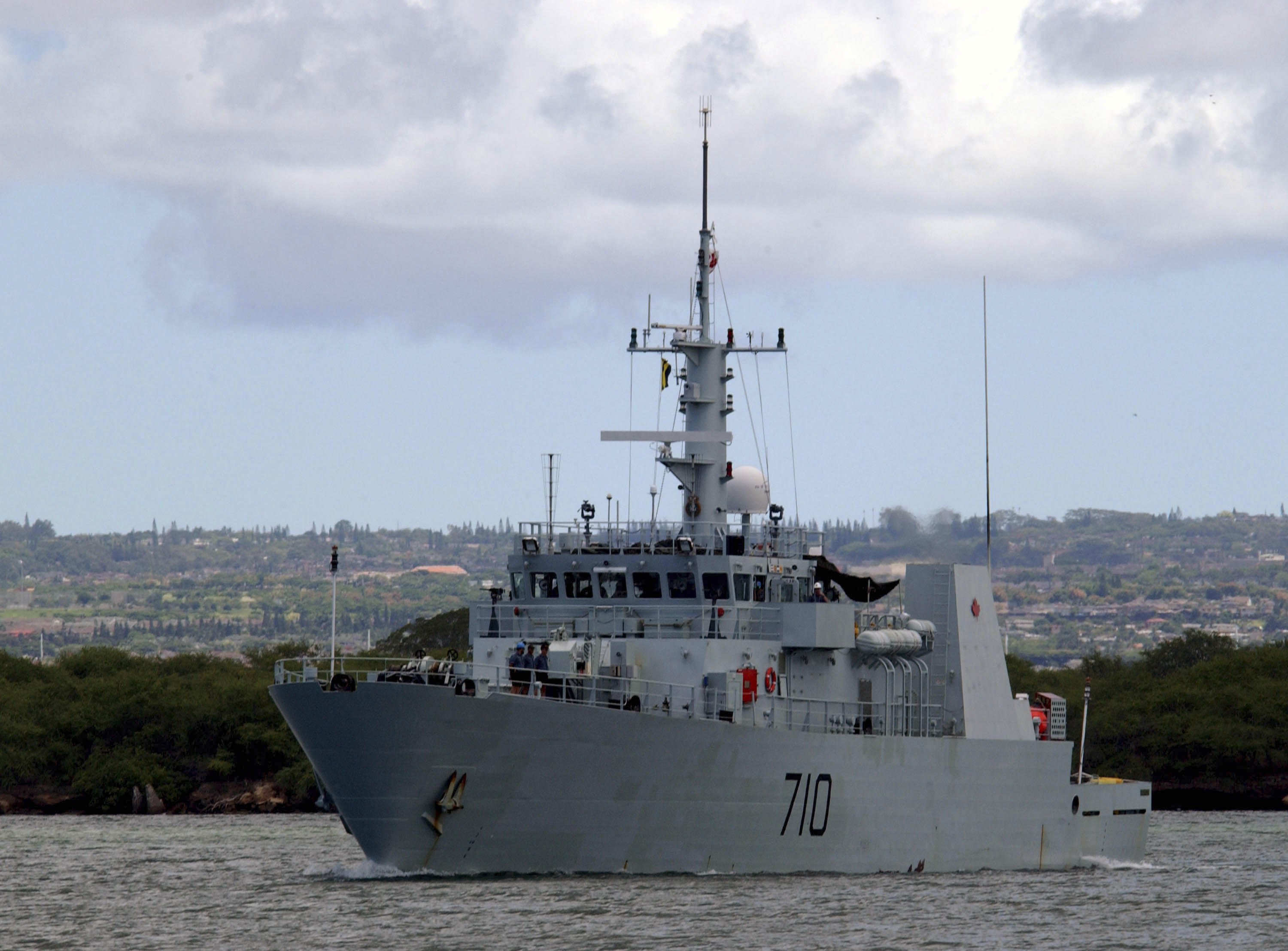
HMCS Brandon

The Naval Reserve (NAVRES) is the reserve formation of the Royal Canadian Navy (RCN). It is organized into 24 Naval Reserve Divisions (NRDs), shore-based training facilities in communities across the country. Each NRD has a small cadre of full-time reservists and regular force members to coordinate training and administration, but is for the most part directed by the division's part-time leadership. Training is conducted year round with regular force counterparts at the three Canadian Forces Fleet Schools and reservists frequently deploy on regular force ships to augment ships' companies. Traditionally, the Naval Reserve supplied all personnel (except two regular forces electricians and one marine engineer) for the 12 Kingston-class Maritime Coastal Defence Vessels (MCDVs), which are used for patrol, minesweeping and bottom-inspection operations. However in 2017, MCDVs were shifted to a blended crew model, skewing more heavily to being primarily crewed by Regular Force (RegF) members. This change was due to the loss of seagoing billets on larger ships typically crewed primarily by RegF members. As of 2012, the Naval Reserve had a funded staffing level of approximately 4,000 members. It has since grown, in accordance with the Justin Trudeau Liberal government's 'Strong, Secure, Engaged' defence policy unveiled in 2017.

=== Army Reserve (the Militia) ===
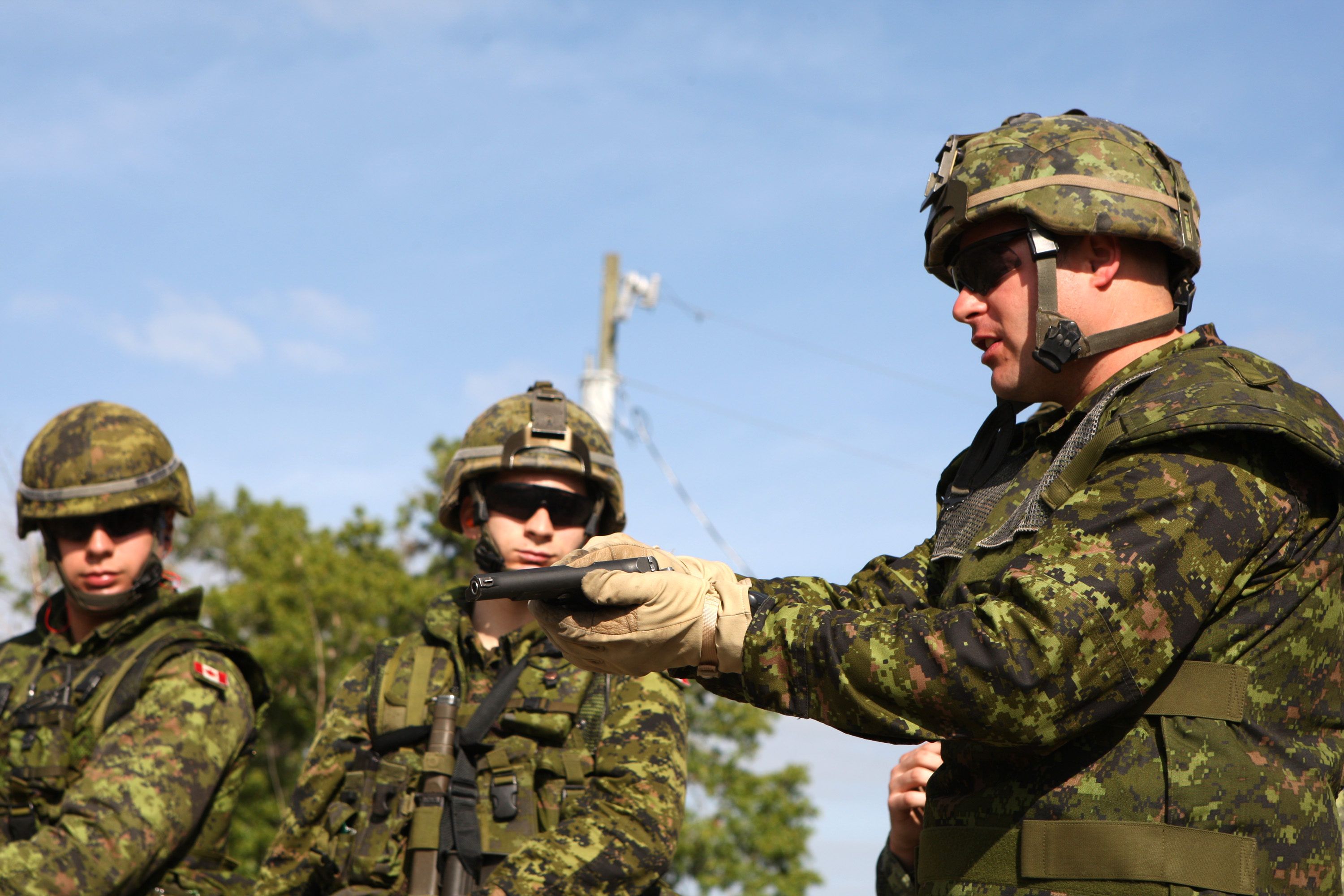
Canadian soldiers inspect Browning Hi-Power

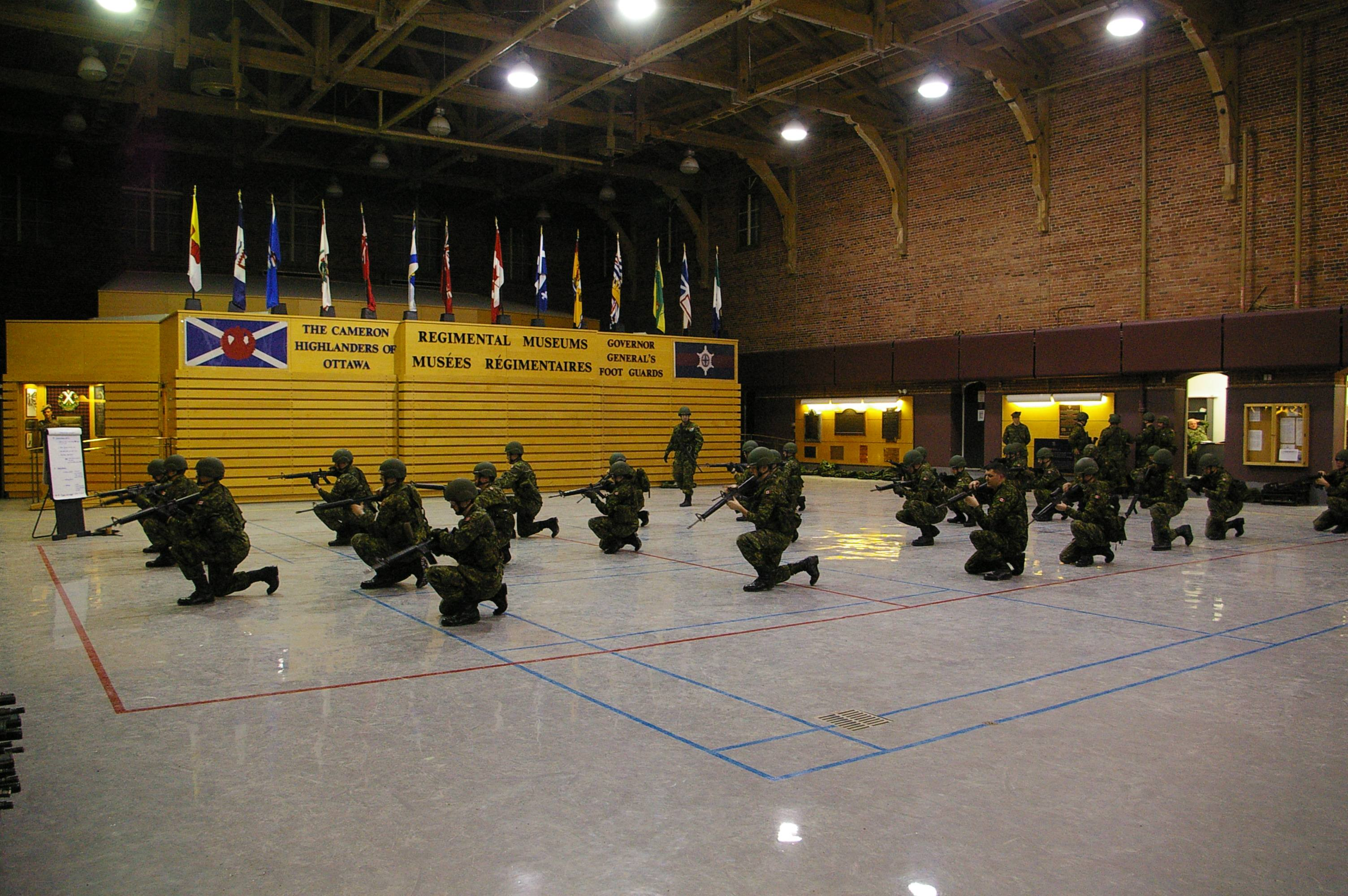
Army reservists conduct weapons training in Cartier Square Drill Hall

The Army Reserve of the Canadian Army is the largest part of the Primary Reserve, with an authorized strength of over 18,000 troops. It is sometimes referred to by its original and historical name, the "Militia". During operations the Army Reserve is tasked to provide fully trained and equipped troops to augment the regular army. It is the time-tested backbone of the Canadian Army and perpetuates the historical force-generation mission. In times of national emergency, it is tasked with providing subordinate units (like platoons and companies) and complete units (battalions). It forms the framework needed to raise a national army during wartime or insurrection.

This fighting mission has not changed much since the Second World War, when the majority of combat units overseas were mobilized battalions detached from their home Militia regiments. In keeping with this mission, regiments of the Army Reserve exist at cadre strength and have a theoretical administrative capacity to support a full battalion upon mobilization, although they maintain a standing force that can typically deploy the manpower of a reduced company. This perpetuates the regimental system in the reserve army so that it is available as such for the timely absorption of recruits in case of war or in aid of the civil power. Such as when the need may one day arise, to call out more than 27,000 supplementary reservists and cadet instructors (who are also subjected to provide general service), to reinforce the order of battle, bringing it up to war establishment. However, in practice the regimental system exists as an important military institution for Canada. In addition to the tactical contribution provided for today's Total Force they also provide a deep-rooted community tie and focus on Canada's military traditions.

The true strength of the Army Reserve is the connection that the extended regimental family fosters with the community. From coast to coast, regimental depots support regimental bands, sponsor army cadet corps, and participate in ceremonial duties and parades, with some even operating old-comrade associations from non-public funds. Many of these activities are overseen by the regimental honorary colonel and honorary lieutenant-colonel. Although the Canadian geography and demographic factors impact unit composition, they mostly function in much the same way. During peacetime, the regimental establishment is typically equivalent of a much reduced battalion consisting of a couple hundred troops and even fewer in some cases.

Normally regiments are commanded by a lieutenant-colonel and consist of a headquarters staff and headquarters company with an administrative and logistical element directed by a small Regular Force support staff. The regiment's subordinate units consist of one training company that may include a platoon devoted to inducting recruits and another platoon conducting recruit training. The Training Company provides candidates for basic courses run at the brigade's battle school and combat arms training conducted at the divisional training centre. Once the soldiers are trade-qualified, they return to their units to serve in the line company (or operational sub-unit) that is ready and equipped to deploy. Each unit will usually deploy a reduced company of two platoons, one of these usually consisting of younger soldiers who have just passed through qualification training. The line company may be rounded out with a third platoon that is involved with retention duties such as refresher training of mature soldiers (this was once known as warrior training) and holding the non-effective strength, with the goal of returning troops back into the line.

Traditionally the militia has been subdivided into district garrisons, and this system is still used as units are grouped along geographic lines into brigades for the purposes of administration, training and operations. The deployable sub unit from each regiment are often operationally tasked and grouped together by the brigade to form a composite all-arms battle group of battalion strength known as territorial battalion groups for combined arms training or defence of Canada tasks in the brigade area of operations.

The battle group is usually commanded by a lieutenant-colonel selected on a rotational basis from one of the brigade units. The order of battle varies depending on the task and the available manpower but generally includes an artillery battery with C3 105 mm howitzers, several companies of truck-mounted light infantry with support weapons, an armoured reconnaissance squadron with G-Wagons equipped with general-purpose machine guns or light anti-tank weapons, and a combat engineer troop. These combat arms troops are supported by signals, service, medical and military police combat support sub-units. The brigades are commanded by a colonel and provide a garrison for the reserve units; however, they are usually ready to contribute a battle group to the division's task force and battle school candidates to the division's training centre.

The Army Reserve is able to significantly increase the effectiveness of the army, due to always actively preparing for battle, as well as training for war. It trains continuously, particularly during the summer months, when combined arms field exercises up to the brigade group level are conducted, and during winter, when the troops must qualify in winter indoctrination and winter warfare exercise. High intensity winter training is necessary as the Army Reserve provides arctic response companies for northern service.

They have participated heavily in all deployments of the Canadian Army over the last decades. In some cases the Army Reserve has contributed as much as 40 percent of the personnel in each deployment in the form of individual augmentation and occasionally formed sub-units (companies). At the peak of the fighting during the War in Afghanistan, almost a quarter of the troops came from the Army Reserve, thus earning new battle honours for Reserve units.

While not the official name, the Army Reserves are often referred to as the Militia based on their historical name.

==== Brigades ====
All Primary Reserve brigades are under command of 2nd Canadian Division.

- 31 Canadian Brigade Group (31 CBG)
- 32 Canadian Brigade Group (32 CBG)
- 33 Canadian Brigade Group (33 CBG)
- 34 Canadian Brigade Group (34 CBG)
- 35 Canadian Brigade Group (35 CBG)
- 36 Canadian Brigade Group (36 CBG)
- 37 Canadian Brigade Group (37 CBG)
- 38 Canadian Brigade Group (38 CBG)
- 39 Canadian Brigade Group (39 CBG)
- 41 Canadian Brigade Group (41 CBG)

=== Air Reserve ===
The Air Reserve is the reserve element of the Royal Canadian Air Force (RCAF). 2,600 air reservists are organized into flights and squadrons that are attached to Regular Force RCAF wings at various bases. Air Reserve personnel conduct training to support wing operations. Air Reserve units are specialized in various areas of surveillance, engineering, and airfield construction. Personnel also conduct further training at Canadian Forces bases and can deploy with Regular Force RCAF crews around the world in support of RCAF missions. Unlike the Naval Reserve and Army Reserve, the Air Reserve is composed principally of former members of the Regular Force and members with civilian qualifications that equate to Air Reserve occupation qualifications.

==== Air Reserve Units ====
- 1 Wing Kingston
  - 400 Tactical Helicopter Squadron
  - 438 Tactical Helicopter Squadron
- 3 Wing Bagotville
  - 3 Wing Air Reserve Flight
- 4 Wing Cold Lake
  - 4 Wing Air Reserve Flight
- 5 Wing Goose Bay
  - 5 Wing Air Reserve Flight
- 8 Wing Trenton
  - 8 Wing Air Reserve Flight
- 9 Wing Gander
  - 9 Wing Air Reserve Flight
    - Air Reserve Flight Detachment Torbay
- 12 Wing Shearwater
  - 12 Wing Air Reserve Flight
- 14 Wing Greenwood
  - 14 Wing Air Reserve Flight
  - 91 Construction Engineering Flight
  - 143 Construction Engineering Flight
  - 144 Construction Engineering Flight
- 16 Wing Borden
  - 16 Wing Air Reserve Flight
- 17 Wing Winnipeg
  - 402 Squadron
  - 17 Wing Air Reserve Flight
- 19 Wing Comox
  - 19 Wing Air Reserve Flight
  - 91 Construction Engineering Flight
- 22 Wing North Bay
  - 22 Wing Air Reserve Flight

=== Health Services Reserve ===
The Health Services Reserve, with approximately 1,700 members, is organized into two functional groups: Primary Reserve units known as field ambulances, and the 1 Canadian Field Hospital Detachment Ottawa. Core tasks assigned to the field ambulances include force-generating trained personnel to support, augment and sustain Canadian Forces Health Services Group's domestic and expeditionary commitments, to provide health services support to their affiliated Canadian brigade groups and to conduct community outreach activities. The members of the 1 Canadian Field Hospital Detachment Ottawa include specialist clinicians and provide depth and breadth to the Health Services Group on international operations and in military clinics within Canada.

== Training and employment ==
The level of activity associated with being a reservist varies from formation to formation. There are three classes of service available to Reservists:

Class A

The most common form of employment for reservists; members are employed on a part-time basis within their unit. This form of employment is entirely voluntary, provides no job security and fewer benefits (e.g., medical and dental) than the other classes of service. The Class A contract covers training or employment up to 12 consecutive days. Class A reservists are generally limited to a certain number of paid days per year.

Most units provide employment for training in the form of one evening per week or two full days a month during the training year (September – April). Units also normally provide one additional evening a week for administration purposes.

Reservists are obliged to accumulate a minimum of 14 full days of service per year and may not exceed 30 days of unauthorized absence during which no fewer than 3 duty periods were conducted by the reservist's unit. Those failing to adhere to these requirements can be deemed to be Non-Effective Strength and can be subject to administrative action.

Class B

This class of service is for Reservists employed full-time in a non-operational capacity. The length of service is dependent on the reservist's availability and the needs of the Canadian Forces. Reservists on Class B service receive many of the same benefits as members of the Regular Force, and for members on terms of service longer than six months duration, almost exactly the same benefits aside from pay. Members on Class A and B service are paid 92.8% of their counterparts on Class C service and in the Regular force.

Class C

This is the operational level of service. Reservists on Class C service receive an increase in pay to the level that a Regular Force member in the same position would be expected to receive (Reservists employed in either of the other classes of service earn 92.8% of the amount their Regular Force counterparts receive). There is no maximum length of a Class C term of service and it is normally in excess of one year. Typically, a reservist in a Class C term of service fills the role of a Regular Force member and is accordingly paid from the Regular Force budget.

== Domestic operations ==
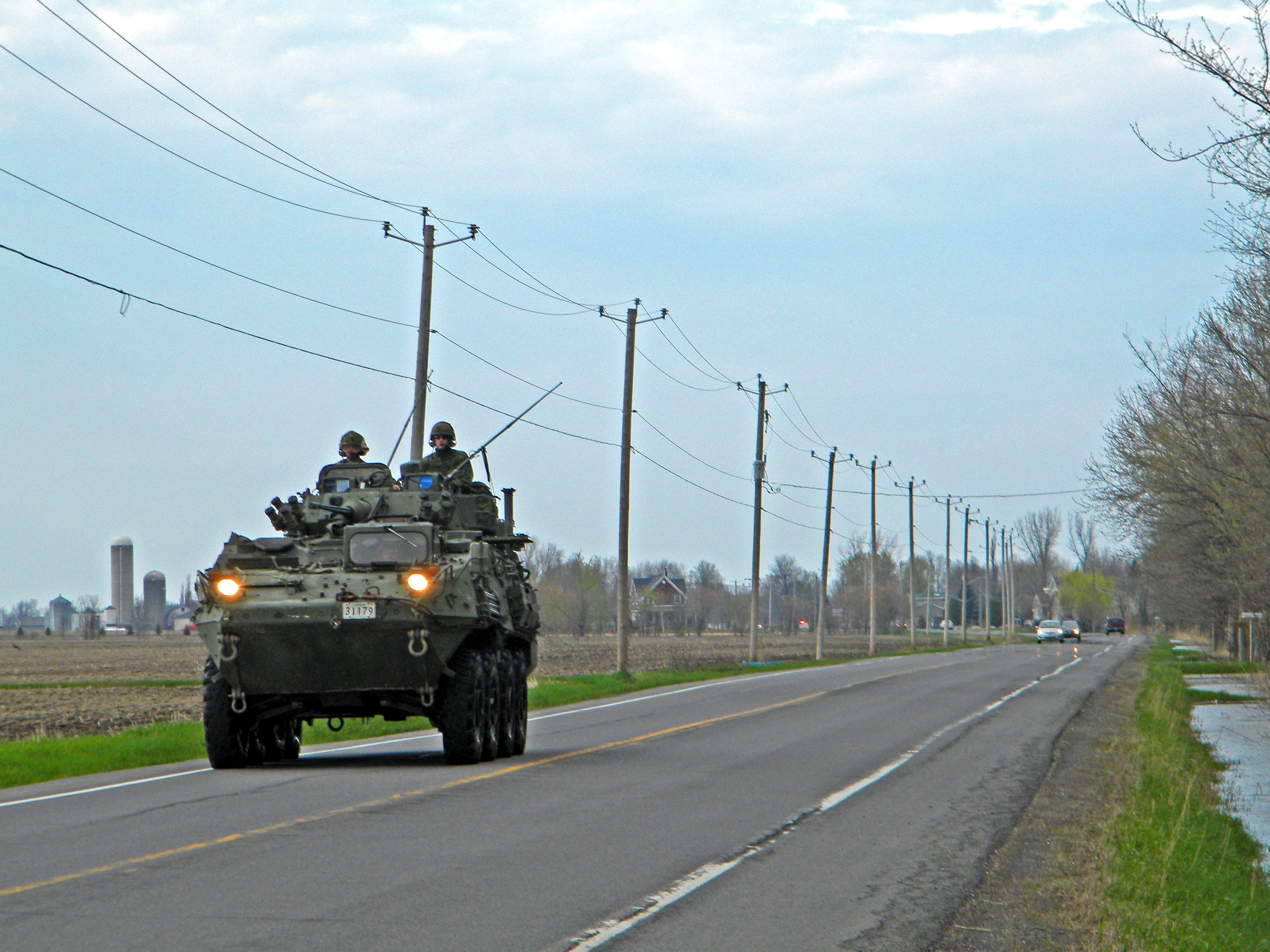
A LAV III during Operation Lotus.

Members of the Primary Reserve may serve in routine domestic operations, or be called up in cases of national emergency as an aid to civil power. This may include rescue operations, disaster management, additional security operations or a threat to national security.

Examples include:

- Operation Cadence: security support during the 2010 Muskoka G8 and Toronto G20 Summits.
- Operation Lama: the joint humanitarian relief mission in Newfoundland after Hurricane Igor.
- Operation Lotus: a military operation to assist flooding victims in the Montérégie area
- Operation Lyre: assistance to flooded communities in southern Manitoba.
- Operations Nanook, Nunalivut and Nunakput: the annual sovereignty operations in Canada's North.
- Operation Palaci: which supports Parks Canada's annual avalanche control program in British Columbia's Rogers Pass.
- Operation Podium: support to security operations for the Vancouver 2010 Olympic and Paralympic Winter Games in February 2010
- Operation Lentus: response to forest fires, floods and natural disasters in Canada. Operated as the first entirely reservist task force, TF Silvertip.
- Operation Laser: assistance to long-term care facilities in Ontario and Quebec, and remote northern communities during the COVID-19 pandemic

== Foreign operations ==
Overseas deployment on operations is voluntary. Members of the Primary Reserve are required to be selected after volunteering and must undergo workup training before being deployed overseas on operations.

In case of a severe national emergency, an Order in Council may be signed by the Governor General of Canada acting under the advice of the federal cabinet to call reserve members of the Canadian Forces into active service. Members of the reserve have not been called to involuntary active service in foreign operations since the Second World War.

== Equipment ==
| Model | Type | Number | Dates | Builder | Details |
|---|---|---|---|---|---|
| MSVS – MilCOTS | Medium Support Vehicle System – Militarized Commercial Off the Shelf | 1300 | 2009– | Navistar International, United States | Replaced the MLVW |
| MSVS – SMP | Medium Support Vehicle System – Standard Military Pattern | 1500 | 2017– | Mack Trucks, United States, Renault Trucks, France | Replaced the MLVW |
| G-Wagen 4 × 4 | Light Utility Vehicle Wheeled | 1,159 | 2004– | Mercedes-Benz, Germany | Replaced the Iltis light trucks in Afghanistan |
| LUVW – MilCOTS – 2003 Silverado Basic model 861 (GM K25943HD) | Light Utility Vehicle Wheeled – Militarized Commercial Off the Shelf | 1,061 | 2003– | Chevrolet, United States | Replacing the Bombardier Iltis jeeps in North American operations only |
| Cougar AVGP | Fire Support Vehicle | 195 | 1976–2005 | General Dynamics, Canada | Replaced by G-Wagen in the interim until the Textron Tactical Armoured Patrol Vehicle comes into service |
| Textron Tactical Armoured Patrol Vehicle | Armoured Car | 500 | 2016- | Textron Marine & Land Systems |
| C3 Close Support Gun | Howitzer | 98 | 1955- | Sorel industries |
| Kingston-class coastal defence vessel | Coastal Defence/Mine Clearance Vessel | 12 | 1996– | Halifax Shipyards | An operational asset of Royal Canadian Navy crewed by reservists |
| 24' RHIB (ZH-733 CDO) | Rigid Hull Inflatable Boat | 24 | 1993– | Zodiac Milpro Canada | Inshore patrol and operations vessel |
| Defender-class boat | Rigid deep-V aluminum hull | ≈5 | 2018- | Metal Shark Boats | A standard boat introduced by the United States Coast Guard in 2002. |

== Aircraft ==
The 400, 402 and 438 squadrons are the only air reserve units that operate aircraft. The 400 and 438 squadrons both operate 5 Bell CH-146 Griffon helicopters, while the 402 squadron operates 4 CT-142 Dash 8 trainers.

== See also ==
- Canadian Militia
- National Band of the Naval Reserve
- Non-Permanent Active Militia
- Permanent Active Militia
