= Cadet Organizations Administration and Training Service =

Component of the Canadian Forces Reserve Force

The Cadet Organizations Administration and Training Service (COATS) is a sub-component of the Canadian Forces Reserve Force whose members have undertaken as their primary duty the supervision, administration and training of the members of the Canadian Cadet Organizations and Junior Canadian Rangers.

Officers of the Cadet Instructors Cadre comprise the largest portion of the 7,500 personnel. The Cadet Instructors Cadre is the largest officer branch in the Canadian Forces. The remainder are former members of the Regular Force and Primary Reserve. Members of the Reserve Force Sub-Component COATS who are not employed part-time (Class A) or full-time (Class B) may be held on the COATS Cadet Instructors Supplementary Staff (CISS) list in anticipation of employment.

== See also ==
- Cadet Instructors Cadre
