= Alachua County Labor Coalition =

Non-profit organisation in Alachua County, Florida, USA

The Alachua County Labor Coalition (ACLC) is a nonprofit organization in Alachua County, Florida, that advocates for working people. The organization was formerly known as the Alachua County Labor Party and traces its roots to the national Labor Party's call in 1996 for a new political party as a reaction to the conservative, neoliberal New Democrat movement.

The ACLC has played a significant role in political campaigns in North Florida. As of September 2022, the co-chairs of the ACLC Executive Committee are Melissa Hawthorne and Jenn Powell.

== Living wage campaign ==
Since 2015, the ACLC has campaigned for the largest North Florida employers to pay living wages. Florida state law bars municipalities from enforcing local minimum wage laws but, using neo-Alinsky tactics and capitalizing on the national Fight for $15 movement, the ACLC pressured Alachua County and the City of Gainesville to adopt ordinances requiring their employees and contractors to be paid a living wage. When the county ordinance was adopted in 2015, organized labor called it the "strongest and most comprehensive living wage ordinance of its kind in the state. By 2018, the University of Florida, the Alachua County School Board, and Santa Fe College—each among the largest employers in the region—increased their employees' wages toward the living wage.

== Campaign for temp workers at the University of Florida ==
In 2017, the ACLC began a campaign to pressure the University of Florida to decrease its reliance on "Other Personnel Services" (OPS) positions---a job classification that is not provided any traditional fringe benefits like paid leave, health insurance, or retirement benefits. The OPS classification was created for temporary part-time workers, but the ACLC found that the university was often using the OPS classification for full-time employees and that some employees were kept in OPS status for years. In 2018, the university announced that it would stop using the OPS classification for non-temporary jobs.

== Renters rights campaign ==
Between 2018 and 2021, the ACLC led a renters rights campaign in Alachua County that led to the adoption of an ordinance that outlawed various forms of rental discrimination, mandated safety standards, and made new energy efficacy requirements for most rental units in the City of Gainesville. During the COVID-19 pandemic, the ACLC began supporting tenants facing eviction.
