= Junior Canadian Rangers =

- Rangers juniors canadiens
- Active: c. 1994 — present
- Country: Canada
- Type: Youth cadets organization
- Size: 135 patrols (more than 4,200 Junior Rangers)
- Part of: Canadian Cadet Organizations
- Headquarters: Ottawa, Ontario, Canada
- Website: http://www.jcr-rjc.ca/

Commanders
- Current commander: Brigadier-General Dominique Brais
- Formation Chief Warrant Officer: Chief Warrant Officer Alex Ardnt

Insignia
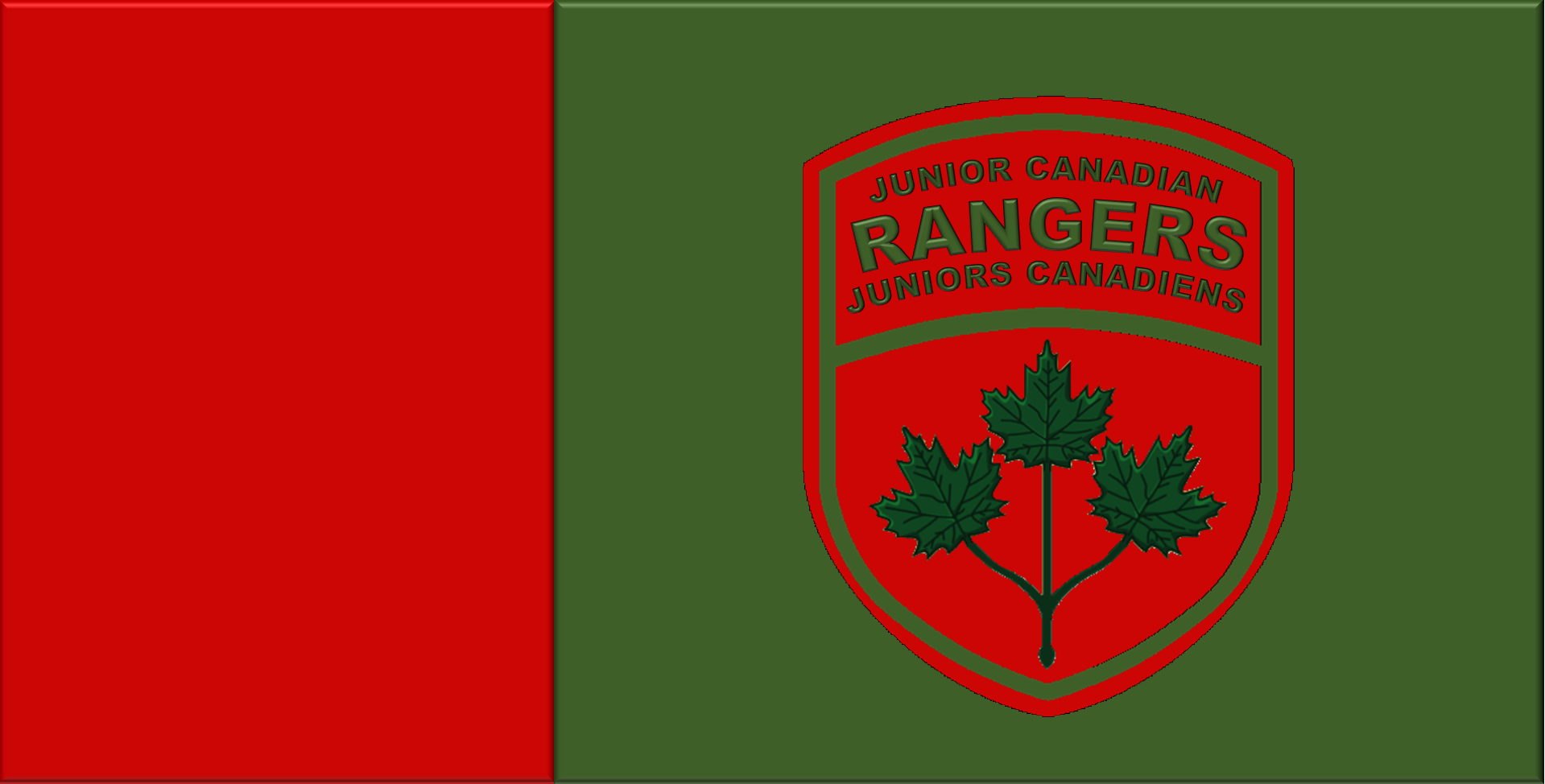
- Flag

The Junior Canadian Rangers (French: Rangers juniors canadiens) is a Canadian national youth program, part of the Canadian Cadet Organizations and linked to the Canadian Rangers. The program aims to offer young Canadians, aged 12 to 18 inclusively, in remote and isolated communities across Canada an opportunity to participate in a range of developmental activities in a formal setting. It also aims to engage them with their local communities.

== Overview ==
The program was created between 1994 and 1998, and there are currently more than 4,200 Junior Canadian Rangers in 135 JCR Patrols in remote and isolated communities across Canada, many of which are in the territory of Nunavut, and with Ontario having almost 1,000 Junior Rangers across 20 First Nations in 2017. Only the provinces of Prince Edward Island, New Brunswick, and Nova Scotia do not have JCRs. Junior Canadian Rangers are easily recognized by their green sweatshirts and ball caps.

Training is delivered to JCRs by Canadian Rangers, civilian Adult Committee member, or community volunteers and is categorized under one of three "circles of learning". These are: Community Traditional skills, Canadian Ranger skills, and Life Skills. Most JCR Patrols conduct some training activities "on the land" to help prepare the youth to survive in the outdoors.

The JCR Program offers a series of Enhanced Training Sessions (summer camps), which are designed to "expand the horizons" of selected youth by offering training, recreational, and cultural opportunities that may not be available in their local community.

The JCR Program is funded by the Government of Canada, through DND and the Canadian Armed Forces. The Canadian Ranger Patrol Groups, under command of the Canadian Army, oversees the conduct of the program at a regional or provincial level.

As of 2025, the Commander of the JCR (and all other Canadian cadet organizations) was Brigadier-General Dominique Brais, and the Formation Chief Warrant Officer was Alex Arndt.

== See also ==
- Canadian Cadet Organizations
- Canadian Rangers
- Department of National Defence (Canada)
