= Army Cadet League of Canada =

Youth organization based in Canada

- Badge of the ACLC
- Abbreviation: ACLC
- Formation: 1 April 1971
- Legal status: Non-profit organization
- Purpose: To support the Royal Canadian Army Cadets
- Headquarters: Ottawa, Ontario, Canada
- Region served: Canada
- Official language: English and French
- President: Cathy Bach
- National Executive Director: Robert Gill
- Affiliations: Department of National Defence; Royal Canadian Army Cadets
- Budget: $23,000,000 CAD
- Volunteers: Approx. 3000
- Website: www.armycadetleague.ca

The Army Cadet League of Canada (ACLC; French: La ligue des cadets de l'Armée du Canada) is the civilian non-profit organization which works with the Department of National Defence (DND) to support the Royal Canadian Army Cadet program. It was founded in 1971 with a branch in every province and one for the northern region. The ACLC consists of several levels from the national council to local support committees.

== History ==
The Cadet Services of Canada (CS of C) was part of the Army reserve and a member of the Canadian Defence Association, which had a major influence on the cadet movement. With the integration of the armed forces in the 1970s and the already operating Air Cadet League of Canada and Navy League of Canada, it placed pressure on the army component to create a new league to represent the Army Cadet program and its sponsors. On 1 April 1971, the Army Cadet League of Canada was formed, as a replacement for the Cadet Services of Canada.

== Role ==
It encouraged army cadets to become better Canadians through citizenship and leadership training. The national branch ensures with the help of the provincial and local branches the funding of transportation, accommodations and training not funded by DND, for 450 Canadian army cadet corps.

== Objective ==
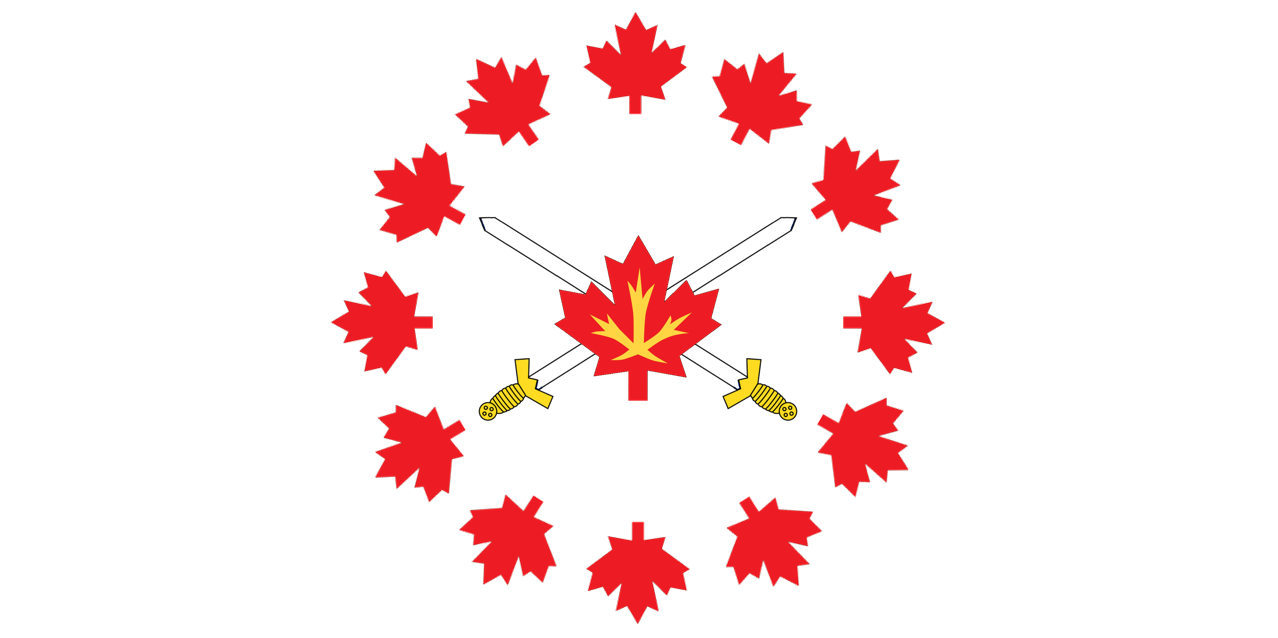
Flag of the Army Cadet League of Canada

The purpose of the ACLC is work with DND to reach the goals of the cadet movement, with a primary focus on the army cadet portion.
The ACLC's objectives are listed as such;

1. Protect the overall interests of the Army Cadet League of Canada.
2. Encourage and promote national interest in and support for Royal Canadian Army Cadets.
3. Provide and supervise local sponsors.
4. Co-ordinate and influence effective support for army cadet corps at all levels.
5. Facilitate and recommend the formation of army cadet corps.
6. Assist in the recruitment of cadet instructors and cadets.
7. Encourage the development of an army cadet program which is adventure-oriented, challenging, consistent with the aims and objectives of the army cadets, and relevant to present society.
8. Collect, receive, hold and invest funds and property received from contributions, gifts, grants, subscriptions or legacies, and, subject to the donor's direction, use such funds for the benefit of the Royal Canadian Army Cadets.

== Presidents ==
Name	Years served
The Hon. Earl Rowe	1971–1977
Sen G. Molgat	1977–1979
LCol H.T. Tye, CD (ret'd)	1979–1981
P. Casgrain	1981–1983
Leslie W. Basham	1983–1985
Col (ret'd) W.I. Somerville, CD	1985–1988
I. Clifton	1988–1990
J.G. Wasteneys	1990–1993
Dennis Fleck	1992–1994
LCol (ret'd) Aubrey J. Halfyard CD	1994–1996
Leslie K. Dean	1996–1998
Debbie Craig	1998–2000
Col (ret'd) Doug Ludlow CD	2000–2001
Gilles Déry	2001–2009
H.B. (Gene) Lake	2009-2010
BGen (ret'd) D.W. Foster	2010-2015
William (Bill) Fletcher	2015–2019
Cathy Bach	2019–Present
