= Canadian Forces Supplementary Reserve =

Military reserve of the Canadian Armed Forces

The Supplementary Reserve (SuppRes) consists of inactive or retired members of the Canadian Forces who are willing and available for active service when requested. Most members transfer from the Regular Force or the Primary Reserve. However, it is possible for an applicant to join the SuppRes with prior service in a foreign military. Applicants with no prior military service may also be considered if they hold a special qualification for which there is a military requirement.

== Organization ==
Currently, the SuppRes is undivided. However, prior to 2002 the two parts of the SuppRes were the Supplementary Holding Reserve (SHR) and the Supplementary Ready Reserve (SRR). The Ready Reserve was to provide a pool of individuals with current skills and who have expressed a willingness to volunteer for duty when requested. The Holding Reserve contained those with less than current skills and/or more restricted availability. The individual commands were responsible for administering their own proportion of the ready reserve, while the holding reserve was administered by National Defence Headquarters.

== Composition ==
The Supplementary Reserve totaled approximately 47,000 personnel in 1995. It had been reduced to 23,600 members as of 1 April 2009, some of whom were unable to be contacted due to outdated contact information. In an effort to meet the VCDS intent for a more operationally focused Supplementary Reserve, members who did not reply to Supplementary Reserve request(s) for written correspondence within the given time frame (minimum 30 days) or for whom a return to sender letter is received from Canada Post were released. This release was recorded as 5(c) – Service completed for which required QR&O, Vol 1, Ch 15.01. The goal was to strengthen the Supplementary Reserve and to provide a true representation to the Canadian Forces of potentially available members for future employment. There were 19,000 Supplementary Reservists on strength as of 31 March 2011.
