= Cadet Instructors Cadre =

Unified cadet instructors branch of the Canadian Armed Forces

- Cadre des instructeurs de cadets
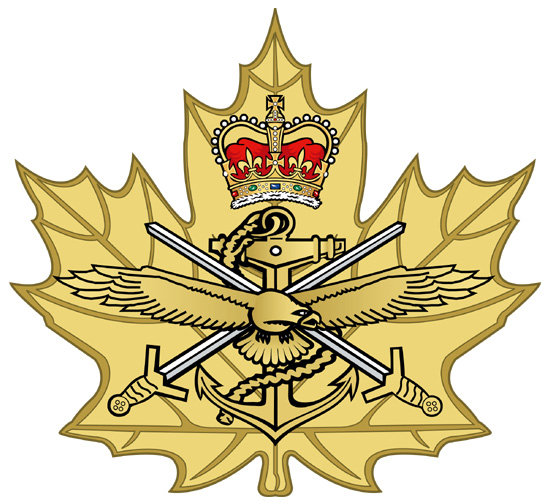
- Badge of the CIC
- Country: Canada
- Branch: Canadian Armed Forces
- Type: Personnel branch
- Role: Responsible for the safety, supervision, administration and training of Royal Canadian Sea, Army and Air Cadets in the Canadian Cadet Organizations
- Size: 7,800 officers
- Part of: Canadian Forces Reserve
- Motto: Illuminate viam (Latin for 'illuminate the way')
- March: "La feuille d'érable"
- Anniversaries: Founded May 1, 1909

The Cadet Instructors Cadre (CIC; French: Cadre des instructeurs de cadets) consists of approximately 7,800 Canadian Forces (CF) officers.who fill various administrative and instructional roles in local cadet units, including Commanding Officer, Training Officer, Administration Officer, and Supply Officer. Members receive specialized training focused on youth development, drill, military writing, CAF regulations, ethics, and creating safe learning environments.

Members of the CIC Officer Branch and Reserve Force Sub-Component COATS undergo a series of training courses that prepare them to work as Officers in the CIC. In all courses, there is a strong emphasis on how to administer, train and supervise cadets.

During initial training members learn: basic officer skills; military writing; drill, dress and behaviour; Canadian Forces laws and regulations; and military ethics and ethos.

Members receive training on youth development and creating a positive learning environment for cadets.

== COATS (Cadet Organization and Training Service) ==
The Cadet Organization and Training Service is a subcomponent of the Reserve Force. COATS employs members from all branches and occupations of the Royal Canadian Navy, Canadian Army, and Royal Canadian Air Force of the Canadian Forces.

Cadets are youth, ages 12 to 18 years, who participate in any of 1,122 corps and squadrons, i.e., Sea, Army, Air, in Canada.

== CIC (Cadet Instructor Cadre) ==
Adults can serve the Cadet Program as members of the Cadet Instructor Cadre, either as officers or non-commissioned members of the Cadet Organizations Administration and Training Service, COATS; or as volunteers. CIC Officers serve in sea, land or air elements. CIC (Cadet Instructor Cadre) members receive specialized training to prepare and qualify people for duties as youth leaders.

A variety of community members apply to be part of the CIC, including: former cadets; Primary Reserve and Regular Force members; and members of the community at large such as parents of cadets.

The CIC Branch consists of approximately 7,800 commissioned officers whose primary duty is the safety, supervision, administration and training of over 52,000 cadets.Cadet Instructor Cadre Officers.

The CIC branch recruits from a variety of backgrounds, including former cadets, retired Regular Force and Primary Reserve personnel, and civilian community members.

To qualify for enrollment in COATS as a CIC officer, applicants must:

Be Canadian citizens between 18 and 63 years of age

Hold a high school diploma or demonstrate equivalent relevant experience

Meet CAF medical standards for the COATS sub-component

Be recommended by a local cadet corps or squadron Commanding Officer, or a Regional Cadet Support Unit Commanding Office

Candidates must be recommended by the Commanding Officer of the Cadet Corps or Squadron that they wish to join, or have the recommendation of the local Regional Cadet Support Unit Commanding Officer. With their recommendation, a person can apply online.

== Order of precedence ==
Preceded by Intelligence Branch	Cadet Instructors Cadre	Succeeded by Last in order of precedence of Personnel branches of the Canadian Forces
