= Fondation Suisse de Déminage =

Swiss NGO

- Type: Non-governmental organisation
- Industry: Landmine relief
- Founded: 1997
- Headquarters: Geneva, Switzerland
- Area served: Global
- Key people: Nawal Ait-Hocine, president, Thierry Burkart, vice-president, Michel Diot, founder and first president of FSD, Henri Leu, founder and former president of FSD,
- Revenue: 31,728,300 Swiss franc (2023)
- Website: fsd.ch

Fondation Suisse de Déminage (FSD) is a Swiss non-governmental organisation specialising in mine action. Since its creation in 1997, FSD has carried out operations in some 30 countries on four continents. Its programmes include the following four components: humanitarian demining, explosive ordnance risk education, victim assistance, and stockpile destruction and management. Since 1997, more than 1.4 million items of explosive ordnance have been neutralised by FSD.

Based in Geneva, the organisation in 2024 employed close to 1000 staff in seven countries. FSD is a ZEWO label holder since 2003, a Swiss label that certifies organisations are transparent and trustworthy to donors. The organisation also holds the ISO 9000:2015 certification.

== History ==
FSD was founded in 1997 in Fribourg under the name of "Fédération suisse de déminage" by Michel Diot, Henri Leu, Hansjörg Eberle and six other members. The first project aimed to train Bosnian asylum seekers who had fled to Switzerland in mine clearance so that they could participate in the reconstruction of their country.

Between 1998 and 2002, FSD launched additional mine action projects in Bosnia and Herzegovina, Croatia, Kosovo, Pakistan, Albania, Afghanistan, Lebanon and Sri Lanka.

In 2001, FSD signed a cooperation agreement with the World Food Programme (WFP) to enable the safe delivery of food aid in Afghanistan and to secure WFP facilities and infrastructure. A similar collaboration was established in Iraq as early as 2003, followed by a series of other agreements between FSD and UN agencies, including in Sudan and Ukraine.

In the aftermath of the attack on the UN headquarters in Baghdad, several FSD staff members helped to evacuate survivors from the bombed building and provided first aid to the injured, putting themselves at considerable risk. FSD received a merit award from the United Nations in recognition of the bravery and dedication beyond the call of duty of its team members in Baghdad.

In 2003, the "Fédération suisse de déminage" transformed from an association under Swiss law to a Foundation and was renamed, "Fondation suisse de déminage".

== Missions ==
The main objective of FSD is to protect civilian populations from mines and explosive remnants of war. Its activities include locating and destroying unexploded ordnance and abandoned mines and ammunition, raising awareness of the dangers of explosive ordnance, assisting victims of accidental explosions, and destroying stockpiles of weapons and ammunition. Furthermore, FSD contributes to strengthening national capacities by supporting the development of local mine action actors and the transfer of technical knowledge. FSD is also involved in research projects to continuously search for new technologies to enhance and improve safety and efficiency in mine action, including the use of specialised drones and satellite imagery.

In addition to the clearance of explosive hazards, FSD also extends its mandate to include decontaminating soils of toxic and polluting substances and support to ongoing peace processes in post-conflict areas through reconstruction, rehabilitation and socio-economic development for vulnerable communities and displaced people.

In parallel, FSD integrates food security components into its programmes, particularly through the rehabilitation of agricultural land in areas affected by explosive contamination.

=== Mine action ===
==== Africa ====
===== Angola =====
The mine problem in Angola is a result of decades of fighting during the Angolan War of Independence and the subsequent civil war. In 2007, FSD was mandated by the Angolan government to carry out a demining needs assessment.

===== Burundi =====
Burundi endured a decade of civil war leaving the country littered with explosive remnants of war, placed without a dispersal plan. In 2003, the government ratified the Ottawa Treaty, and the National Council for the Defence of Democracy (CNDD-FDD) and signed the Geneva Call commitment in the presence of an FSD delegation. Due to a partnership between UNDP, UNICEF, FSD and MAG, with funding from Swiss cooperation and the Government of Burundi, humanitarian mine clearance projects began.

FSD established a project supporting the peace process, based on the creation of a national mine action authority, assessments of the impact of mines on local communities and risk education in mined areas. In 2006, FSD also conducted a general community survey across the country, in which 97% of all mine-affected communities were visited and assessed. The results of this survey formed the basis for demining activities in the following two years. The approach proposed by FSD was based on a partnership with the International Centre for Research and Initiatives for Dialogue (CIRID), a Burundian NGO based in Geneva.

Burundi was declared landmine-free in 2011.

===== Central African Republic =====
In collaboration with Association FSD France, FSD has been carrying out humanitarian projects in the Central African Republic since 2014, even though the country is marred by a decade-long civil war. An awareness-raising campaign on the risks of handling unexploded and abandoned weapons and ammunition was launched in 2014. Between 2015 and 2017, FSD implemented a project of humanitarian and dignified reburial of people who had been summarily buried outside of recognised cemeteries, as well as armed violence reduction campaigns. In 2017, FSD started a project to rehabilitate Batangafo town located in the Ouahm-Fafa prefecture. Since 2019, FSD has run a programme in support of demilitarisation, demobilisation and reintegration (DDR) of ex-combatants as part of the Khartoum Peace Agreement, including through the rehabilitation of infrastructure. Activities to support socio-economic development and to promote the reintegration of former combatants are also implemented. Within the framework of its projects, FSD signed an agreement with the "Jeunesse pionnière nationale" to support the training of young people in the implementation of its projects.

In 2024, FSD continued supporting communities in Bangui and Bouar through vocational training in trades such as agriculture, sewing, and IT. Special attention was given to women, people with disabilities, and former combatants. Support was also provided to schoolchildren and orphans.

===== Chad =====
The explosive contamination of Chad is largely as a result of the 1973 Chadian–Libyan War and 30 years of internal conflict. The contamination is a permanent threat to the local populations, and has a negative impact on the socio-economic development of Borkou, Ennedi and Tibesti, which are among Chad's poorest regions.

From 2017 to 2022, FSD was part of the PRODECO clearance project, launched in 2017 by the European Union, in consortium with three other organisations: Humanity and Inclusivity, MAG and Secours Catholique Développement (SECADEV), a local victim support NGO. Within the framework of this project, the role of FSD was to provide administrative, logistical, managerial and technical support to the national mine action authority (HCND - High Commission for National Demining). FSD also provided technical support to update the national demining database (IMSMA) used for the collection of clearance data and the production of maps and reports. The project came to an end in 2022.

===== Democratic Republic of Congo =====
The Democratic Republic of Congo has experienced numerous conflicts of varying intensity since 1996 without the extent of actual mine contamination being known. FSD's involvement in the country dates back to November 2003, at the request of UNMAS, and aimed to set up two emergency demining teams benefitting local communities and humanitarian aid organisations in Bunia. The deployment and mission orders of the teams were placed under the responsibility of the Mine Action Coordination Centre (UNMACC) established by the UN in Kinshasa within its peacekeeping force, MONUSCO. FSD recruited and trained around twenty local staff. Operations were suspended in 2005 due to lack of funding.

===== Libya =====
FSD began demining operations in 2011 and after several deployments and varied operations, left the country in 2018. To coordinate the mine action response after the first Libyan Civil War in 2011, the UN and international NGOs joined forces to form a "Joint Mine Action Coordination Team" (JMACT) of which FSD was a member. The USA-funded FSD's programme to locate and destroy explosive remnants of war in Libya's ex-combat zones to prevent possible weapons, such as anti-aircraft missiles, from falling into the hands of terrorists. The programme started in 2011 and initially included two combat clearance teams before focusing efforts around the city of Sirte after the death of Colonel Gaddafi. From 2013 to 2018, FSD conducted its humanitarian clearance activities from Tripoli and ammunition management and storage disposal and training in Hun and Waddan for a mixture of Libyan police and military engineer personnel.

In 2013, under a separate programme, FSD implemented a country wide survey of former Libyan ammunition storage areas based out of Benghazi under funding from the US Non-Proliferation and Disarmament Fund (NDF). This provided data on quantities of ordnance that had been stored, the state and security of storage facilities and informed future ordnance management and disposal needs.

===== Mali =====
After a decade of conflict between multiple armed groups and the 2020 Malian coup d'état, Mali faces an ever-growing threat from explosive devices. In 2014 this was initially from conventional weapons, mines and ordnance but quickly grew into armed non-state actors using improvised explosive devices (IEDs). Mali does not have a national mine action authority and therefore remains dependent on external entities to coordinate demining efforts. From 2013 to 2014, FSD carried out an explosive ordnance risk education project and an ammunition safety management project in collaboration with UNICEF, UNMAS and other international actors. This programme enabled the training of several experts on-site to ensure a sustainable transfer of skills.

===== Mozambique =====
When FSD's programme started in Mozambique in 2006, the country was one of the most heavily mined in the world. FSD's project provided technical support and capacity building in humanitarian demining, victim assistance and mine risk education to the Regional Office of the National Institute for Demining (IND). In 2008, the IND team trained by FSD achieved promising results, marking the end of this project. In 2015, Mozambique was declared landmine-free.

===== Sudan =====
Since its independence in 1956, Sudan has experienced several civil wars, which have left a legacy of mines and explosive remnants of war. FSD was mandated in February 2004 through UNOPS to support the Sudanese mine action authorities and UNMAS, thus sending teams to the Nuba Mountains region. Additionally, FSD started a skills transfer partnership with the Khartoum-based NGO FPDO (Friends of Peace and Development Organization). In May 2006, FSD trained national staff to conduct mine clearance in the Kassala and the Red Sea State. At the same time, FSD conducted missions to support disarmament, demobilisation and reintegration for development efforts around the Darfur and Malakal.

===== South Sudan =====
In 2004, FSD signed a partnership agreement with the local NGO SIMAS « Sudan Integrated Mine Action Services» and the World Food Programme pledging to recruit, train and mentor deminers in southern Sudan and to support the work of the United Nations Advance Mission in the Sudan (UNAMIS). In late 2005, FSD deployed 30 expatriates and 250 local deminers as part of a clearance programme to secure key access routes from the south of the country to Juba enabling the World Food Programme to distribute aid and facilitate the return of refugees. With the support of FSD in 2007, SIMAS employed, trained, and deployed its first demining team after receiving accreditation from the United Nations Mine Action Office (UNMAS). In partnership with FSD, SIMAS organised a workshop in 2010 in Juba for representatives of the Transitional Government of Southern Sudan, the Southern Sudan Demining Authority, UNMAO and UNICEF, in response to the low level of support for mine action in South Sudan and the decline of international funding. FSD continued to support SIMAS for many years after this with technical advice, proposal writing and mentoring until 2016.

==== Asia & Pacific ====
===== Afghanistan =====
Afghanistan is one of the most mine-affected countries in the world. Many civilians are still killed or maimed every year by accidental explosions. FSD operations in Afghanistan began in 2001 with the dispatch of clearance teams to support the deployment of the World Food Programme and the UN Office for the Coordination of Humanitarian Affairs in Kandahar and later in Herat, Mazar-i-Sharif and Kabul. In 2010, FSD started a clearance programme in the remote mountainous region of Darwaz (Badakhshan province) and conducted mine risk education sessions and, from 2019 onwards, a programme of socio-economic assistance to mine victims. FSD continues its work in the area despite the uncertain situation since the 2021 Taliban offensive. FSD operates in Badakhshan and Kunduz provinces, clearing contaminated land and restoring access to farmland. In 2024, emergency assistance was provided after flooding in Baghlan.

===== Laos =====
From 2004 to 2010, FSD supported WFP's food security programme and carried out clearance and rehabilitation of rice fields, irrigation systems and fish farms, as well as road improvements in the eastern districts of Savannakhet. In September 2007, FSD cleared the Sekong area in partnership with CARE Australia as part of their livelihoods improvement project. In parallel to its demining work, FSD assisted local entities by providing training in explosive ordnance disposal. Additionally, FSD participated in drafting national clearance standards and in the creation of a national database for the National Regulatory Authority. In 2008 and 2009, FSD developed training standards for national authorities to govern the quality of technical training in Laos and to ensure that international training standards are followed.

===== Pakistan =====
Pakistan has a significant number of victims of mines and explosive remnants of war. The contamination of the country is the result of various armed conflicts with India, the Soviet-Afghan War, followed by the anti-government incursion and occupation of some districts by the Taliban in 2009. Extensive fighting in the Northwest Frontier Province of Khyber Pakhtunkhwa resulted in a mass displacement of over 2.8 million people. Their removal from combat zones was quickly followed by their return to an environment highly contaminated by explosive remnants of war, the context in which FSD began its work.

From 2009 to 2011, FSD ran a large-scale project that focused on raising awareness of the danger of explosive remnants of war. In association with the Sustainable Peace and Development Organisation (SPADO) and with the Organisation for Basic Education and Vocational Training (Best), FSD trained twenty teams from afflicted areas to teach safety skills to the affected population.

===== The Philippines =====
FSD's programme in the Philippines began in 2005 with technical support to the peace process between the Philippine government and the Moro Islamic Liberation Front on the island of Mindanao. In close collaboration with Association FSD France, FSD carried out technical and non-technical survey work, mine risk education and the facilitation of clearance of explosive remnants of war. In 2020, a mine risk education campaign was launched on social networks following restrictions related to COVID-19. In 2024, FSD collaborated with authorities to integrate safety messages into school curricula.

===== Sri Lanka =====
During Sri Lanka's 26-year civil war, thousands of anti-personnel mines were laid. According to information from the National Mine Action Centre, the total remaining contaminated area was still 23,306,478 square metres in 2019.

From 2002 to 2013, FSD ran one of the largest clearance programmes in Sri Lanka. The programme began after a formal request for assistance from UNDP, which in turn mandated FSD to build national capacity for future District Mine Action Office (DMAO) operations. In addition, FSD cleared districts in the north and east of the country for the duration of the programme. After the resumption of hostilities in 2006, efforts shifted from local capacity building to emergency mine and explosive remnants of war awareness campaigns. As NGOs were not allowed to carry out risk education, FSD worked with community liaison officers to understand the local mine action priorities of displaced people and to carry out awareness sessions.

To allow the return of displaced persons as soon as possible, demining operations continued with four Dok-Ing MV-4 machines and other mechanical means. The clearance of wells from explosive ordnance by specific FSD teams also had a major impact, as it required them to be cleaned out completely, thus ensuring access to drinking water for the local population. In addition, FSD collaborated with the Regional Mine Action Bureau (RMAC) and the Sri Lankan Electricity Board. Demining operations also supported the Master Plan of the Mahaweli Development Programme.

===== Vietnam =====
Vietnam suffers from massive mine and ERW contamination. Since the end of the Vietnam War, according to government estimates, more than 40,000 people have fallen victim to these explosive remnants.

Throughout 2007, FSD developed close contacts with the Vietnamese government through the Vietnamese Embassy in Bern. Two assessment missions were conducted to evaluate the needs in three central provinces.

==== South America ====
===== Colombia =====
For 50 years, Colombia has experienced internal struggles between government forces, the FARC and ELN guerrillas and the paramilitary group AUC. Thirty of Colombia's 32 departments are affected by the presence of explosive devices.

FSD initially provided ad hoc support to the Colombian government's Mine Observatory from 2004 and supported the CCCM (Colombian campaign to ban landmines). Since 2010, FSD contributed to the training of local experts, and after the signing of the Peace Accords in 2016, the organisation provided technical assistance to "Descontamina Colombia" (the national mine action authority in Colombia), which coordinates mine and explosive remnants of war clearance operations, mine risk education, data management and victim assistance. As part of its support to Descontamina Colombia, FSD was instrumental in the drafting of national mine action standards. In addition, FSD contributed to the drafting and publication of the environmental decree # 1195, 2017 aimed at reducing the environmental impact of humanitarian demining interventions throughout the country, especially in natural parks and other areas of high ecological value. FSD’s capacity-building activities in Colombia concluded in 2024, following the successful transfer of technical expertise and institutional support to national authorities.

In 2022, FSD started supporting mine victims in Bogotá through the installation of hydroponic structures on their balcony, allowing them to launch small businesses adapted to their disability. Initially conceived as individually based systems, the initiative has since evolved into a community-based approach that promotes food security, recovery, and economic inclusion in centres welcoming conflict victims in Bogotá.

==== Europe & Central Asia ====
===== Albania =====
Albania was contaminated by mines and unexploded remnants of war mainly as a result of the Kosovo War in 1998–1999. FSD deployed a demining programme in the country in October 2000 at the initiative of the International Committee of the Red Cross (ICRC) and with the support of the Swiss Department of Defence (DDPS), and began by conducting a contamination assessment. In May 2001, FSD was accredited by the Albanian government and recruited and trained about 50 local staff in humanitarian mine clearance, so that it operations could begin in the north of the country. The programme ended in 2004. In 2009, Albania declared itself officially mine-free.

===== Armenia =====
Armenia's mine contamination is mainly the result of First Nagorno-Karabakh War from 1988 to 1994. As of 2012, FSD organised training to prepare non-technical surveys requested by the Armenian Ministry of Defense. These investigations focused on areas close to the border with Turkey, avoiding the restricted military zone and the Kapan region. From 2013 to early 2015, FSD ran a local skills development programme. The organisation also contributed to the development of the Armenian National Mine Action Standards (NMAS) and supported the Armenian Centre for Humanitarian Demining in the establishment and management of the National Information Management System for Mine Action (IMSMA) database.

===== Bosnia-Herzegovina =====
The Bosnian War, which took place from 1992 to 1995, resulted in heavy contamination of the country with mines and unexploded ordnance. From 1997 to 1999, FSD maintained a project in collaboration with the UN Mine Action Centre. The programme consisted of two humanitarian demining projects in densely populated areas of Sarajevo. To this end, FSD trained former Bosnian military personnel in mine clearance and employed 16 local deminers.

===== Croatia =====
The minefields in Croatia are remnants of the Croatian War of Independence. From 1998 to 1999, FSD carried out a demining programme in the village of Kusonje on behalf of the Swiss association Causes Communes. This represented the first humanitarian demining operation carried out by an NGO on Croatian territory.

===== Kosovo =====
The 1999 international conflict in Kosovo created a serious problem of explosive remnants of war. ICRC signed an agreement with FSD in 2000. Under this agreement, FSD clearance teams responded to urgent requests referred to them by ICRC. The teams worked with local communities to directly involve them in the technical response to the problem of mines and explosive remnants in their villages. In early 2001, due to the decrease in emergencies, FSD restructured its programme into a single unit specialising in combat zone demining. The FSD programme was visited several times by official delegations from the UN, OSCE and KFOR.

===== Tajikistan =====
FSD has been active in Tajikistan since 2003, carrying out various projects in mine clearance, destruction of stockpiles of weapons and ammunition and capacity building. The programme started with assessments and surveys determining the extent and characteristics of the country's contamination, before moving on to actual mine clearance operations. As part of its programmes, FSD has deployed several methods of demining (manual, mechanical, and with dogs). In recent years, FSD has focused on supporting the Tajik authorities in the safe destruction of stockpiles of weapons and ammunition, including man-portable air defence systems (MANPADS) and in 2023 will once again return to demining.

In 2010, FSD cleared most of the areas contaminated during the Tajikistani Civil War and focused on clearing mine belts laid by former Soviet forces on the Tajik side of the Tajikistan/Afghanistan border. That same year, Norwegian People's Aid joined FSD. Due to a lack of funding, FSD was forced to cease its clearance operations in Tajikistan in 2018 but continued its efforts to destroy stockpiles of weapons and ammunition. By the end of the humanitarian demining programme, FSD had handed over 38 million square metres of land.

In 2024, FSD resumed and extended demining operations in border regions with Afghanistan, Kyrgyzstan, and Uzbekistan, becoming the largest humanitarian demining organisation operating in Tajikistan.

===== Ukraine =====
FSD's involvement in Ukraine dates back to early 2015, with a mine risk education programme in the Donbas region. After obtaining its accreditation for humanitarian demining in the country in 2017, FSD launched a mine and explosive remnants disposal programme in the eastern part of Ukraine, in areas under Ukrainian government control. In 2022 following the Russian invasion, fighting intensified and spread throughout the country and FSD's activities were initially reoriented to provide emergency humanitarian aid (food, shelter, medicine, fuel, etc.). As soon as the security situation allowed, large scale survey, demining and risk education operations resumed with increased staffing and resources in the provinces of Chernihiv and Kharkiv.

FSD's teams in Ukraine also developed significant capacity to survey and clear agricultural land in partnership with WFP and the clearance of urban areas with armoured rubble removal machines and specialist personnel.

In 2023, the FSD set up a new project in Ukraine in partnership with the World Food Programme and the Food and Agriculture Organisation of the United Nations. Ukraine produces food for 400 million people in peacetime, so this project aims to enable the small farms in Kharkiv province to return to cultivating their land sustainably. To achieve this, the FSD has provided mine clearance, risk education and non-technical surveys.

In 2024, FSD became one of Ukraine’s largest humanitarian mine action organisations with over 650 staff members. Operations expanded to Donetsk and Kherson regions, with clearance, risk education, and NGO capacity-building activities. By early 2025, FSD reported having surveyed 117 square kilometres of land and cleared 2.5 square kilometres of contaminated areas in Ukraine. Trials with drone-based survey tools also began, supporting agricultural recovery and reconstruction efforts. Moreover, FSD began the use of mine detection dogs in Ukraine to support survey and clearance operations.

==== Middle East ====
===== Iraq =====
Four wars in less than thirty years have left Iraq heavily contaminated by mines and explosive remnants of war. FSD's first intervention in Iraq began in 2003 with a humanitarian clearance programme as well as technical assistance for the World Food Programme. In 2016, following the occupation of part of Iraq by the Islamic State group, FSD launched a humanitarian clearance project focusing on artisanal landmines and improvised explosive devices. In the first year, FSD removed more than 5,000 explosive devices and secured millions of square meters of land, particularly in Kurdistan and the northern provinces of Iraq. FSD also ran an explosive ordnance risk education project with over 500 sessions delivered to approximately 16,000 men, women, boys and girls in Mosul district that year. In September 2020, FSD also started a project to support, mentor and develop a local national demining NGO in Iraq (SHO). In 2024, FSD reached a major milestone in Iraq, having cleared over 33 million square metres of land contaminated by explosive hazards since the start of its operations in the country. Its support to local partner SHO concluded successfully, with the NGO now operating independently.

===== Lebanon =====
Lebanon faces a complex threat of explosive devices stemming mainly from four events: the Israeli occupation of Southern Lebanon (1978 - 2000), the Lebanese Civil War (1975 - 1990), the Israeli–Lebanese conflict in 2006 and, more recently, the Syrian civil war spill over (2011 - 2017). FSD's humanitarian clearance project was launched in 2006. It consisted of four teams of eight people under the aegis of UNMAC (United Nations Mine Action Centre) in conjunction with LMAC (Lebanese Mine Action Centre). At the end of the project, more than 587,546 square meters were secured and returned to the community.

=== Other humanitarian activities ===
In addition to mine action, FSD carries out projects in the following areas: support for peace and development, emergency humanitarian assistance and environmental activities for cleanup and revitalization projects, the protection of biodiversity and resilience against climate change.

==== Peace and development ====
Activities supporting peace processes are linked to mine action, particularly during negotiations on access to previously mined land and its development for community use. For example, FSD signed a cooperation agreement with the Sri Lankan government and with the Tamil National Army, also known as the Liberation Tigers of Tamil Eelam (LTTE), helping to consolidate the peace process.

FSD has been involved in the peace process in the Philippines since 2005, providing technical expertise to the Philippine government and the Moro Islamic Liberation Front (MILF). On the 5th of May 2010, the two former belligerents signed a peace agreement providing for the implementation of a joint demining project, proposed by FSD and the local NGO Philippines Campaign to Ban Landmines.

In the Central African Republic, FSD offered vocational training to help former rebel combatants reintegrate into society and to assist vulnerable communities to recover with improvement to basic facilities and socio-economic development opportunities.

In Colombia, FSD promoted social cohesion by supporting mine survivors and displaced persons through urban agriculture programmes in victim assistance centres.

==== Emergency aid ====
From time to time, when struck by disaster where FSD has open programmes, FSD provides emergency humanitarian aid in the event of natural disasters or active armed conflict in its areas of operation. Examples include the 2004 tsunami in Sri Lanka and the war in Ukraine in spring 2022. In 2024, FSD responded to severe flooding in northern Afghanistan by providing emergency medical kits to affected communities.

==== Environment ====
In the environment sector, FSD focuses on many depollution operations such as cleaning up land polluted by persistent organic pollutants or heavy metals and reducing the risks posed by uranium mines in Tajikistan and Kyrgyzstan. FSD also has operations contributing to building resilience against climate change and improving food security in Tajikistan, Central African Republic, Afghanistan and Colombia.

==== Innovation and technology ====
FSD takes an active role in pursuing the development of new technologies to support mine clearance and all of its work to increase safety and efficiency in its operations. In 2016, FSD published a study on the use of drones during humanitarian crises. FSD also worked with the European Space Agency in 2015 to 2018 looking into the use of remote sensing (drones and satellites) to enhance demining capacity. It also joined the technical steering committee of the Odyssey2025 project, which ended in 2020, to support the development of drones capable of detecting PFM-1 mines. Since 2016, FSD has been working in partnership with the Urs Endress Foundation on the FindMine project, aimed at developing a drone capable of locating mines and explosive remnants of war.

In 2024, FSD began testing drone-mounted ground-penetrating radar in Ukraine to improve non-technical surveys in contaminated agricultural areas. FSD uses Geographic Information System (GIS) mapping as a core component of its information management processes, enabling precise geolocation of hazardous areas, planning of clearance tasks, and visualisation of operational progress. GIS tools support evidence-based decision-making and contribute to the efficient release of land.

== Support and funding ==
FSD's humanitarian operations are funded by governments, multilateral organisations, foundations and private donations. Major donors include the European Union, the European Commission (EC), EuropeAid, UNOPS, the World Food Programme (WFP), the United Nations Development Programme (UNDP), United Nations Mine Action Service (UNMAS), UNICEF, the US Department of State PM/WRA, the governments of Australia, Canada, Germany, Switzerland, Swiss cantons and cities, foundations and private donors.

== The FSD Group ==
The FSD Group, a consolidated entity, includes FSD (Fondation suisse de déminage), Association FSD France and Crosstech SA (a wholly owned commercial subsidiary of FSD).

=== Association FSD France ===
In 2005, FSD was joined by a new French partner, Association FSD France. This organisation is part of the FSD Group and operates under a cooperation agreement with the Fondation suisse de déminage (FSD), which implements its projects in the field. Its objective is to expand the mine action activities already carried out by FSD. Its main donor is the European Commission.

=== Crosstech SA ===
Crosstech SA is a Swiss company specialising in explosive hazard management for post-conflict reconstruction projects. It provides risk management services to companies working in areas affected by landmines and explosive remnants of war. Crosstech’s services include risk assessments, explosive ordnance disposal, land clearance, rubble removal, and safety training. The company employs various methods such as surveying, geospatial analysis, and mechanical clearance to support infrastructure reconstruction in potentially hazardous areas.

Established in 2007, Crosstech is a commercial subsidiary of the Swiss humanitarian NGO FSD (Fondation suisse de déminage) and is fully owned by FSD.

== See also ==
- Ottawa Treaty (Mine Ban Treaty)
- Mine clearance agencies
- Demining
