= Superman and Wonder Woman: The Hidden Killer =

Comic book

Superman and Wonder Woman – the Hidden Killer
- English-language cover of Superman and Wonder Woman – the Hidden Killer (1993).

Publication information
- Publisher: DC Comics
- Format: Ongoing series
- Genre: Superhero
- Publication date: 1993
- Main character(s): Superman; Wonder Woman

Creative team
- Created by: Jerry Siegel; Joe Shuster; William Moulton Marston

Superman and Wonder Woman – the Hidden Killer is a special-edition "humanitarian comic book" featuring Superman and Wonder Woman that promotes "landmine awareness" among children, particularly from countries where there are active landmines after war. The free comic book was published from 1993 through 1999 by DC Comics, the United States Department of Defense, the Mine Action Center (MAC), the United Nations International Children's Emergency Fund (UNICEF), and participating non-governmental organizations (NGOs). In the comic book, Superman and Wonder Woman are featured as educators who are teaching children about the dangers of landmines.

== Description ==
The Spanish version of the comic book has 32-pages and has a text on the back portion of the cover that says "Superman and Wonder Woman have come to help the children of Central America! But even when they cannot be here, you can keep yourself safe from landmines." 24 pages of the comic book were devoted to the illustrated narrative, while the remaining 8 were allotted for activities for eight- to fifteen-year-old children.

== Storyline development ==
The storyline for Superman and Wonder Woman – the Hidden Killer was recommended to DC Comics by American soldiers belonging to the 1st PSYOP Airborne Battalion from Fort Bragg, North Carolina in the United States. The same soldiers first conducted minefield assessments while in Costa Rica, Honduras, and Nicaragua.

== Plot ==
Superman and Wonder Woman – the Hidden Killer is about two brothers and a sister, named Miguel, Diego, and Gabriela respectively. Superman and Wonder Woman rescues one of the brothers from a minefield. Gabriela is saved from a landmine by Wonder Woman. Superman and Wonder Woman teaches the children about the dangers of landmines through signs, posters, and by introducing them to a child who had been a victim of a landmine explosion.

== Languages ==
Superman and Wonder Woman – the Hidden Killer was published in English (90,000 copies) and Spanish (560,000 copies). The Spanish-language – also known as the Central American or Latin American version – were disseminated for Spanish-speaking countries, including Costa Rica, Honduras, and Nicaragua. The title of the comic book in Spanish is Superman y la Mujer Maravilla – El Asesino Escondido. There were plans of translating the comic book into Portuguese for dissemination in countries such as Angola and Mozambique.

== Launch and distribution ==
The Spanish version of Superman and Wonder Woman – the Hidden Killer was released on 11 June 1998 in New York City at the UNICEF House building. It was launched by Brian Sheridan, a representative of the United States Department of Defense.

== See also ==
- Superman: Deadly Legacy
- Batman: Death of Innocents
- Mine action
- Mine clearance agencies
- International Campaign to Ban Landmines (ICBL)
