= JSSR =

JSSR may refer to:

- Journal for the Scientific Study of Religion
- The Journal of Social Studies Research
- Justice and security sector reform
