= MineWolf Systems =

- Industry: Mine action
- Products: mine clearance platforms, unmanned ground vehicles, EOD, Route clearance, clearance of cluster munitions

MineWolf Systems provides machines and services for the mechanical clearance of landmines and other explosive devices. Its customers are mine clearance agencies in the commercial, humanitarian and military demining field. British company Pearson Engineering Ltd, a leading provider of Combat Engineer equipment, announced acquisition of the IP and Assets of MineWolf Systems in 2016.

== History ==
The first design steps for the MineWolf mine clearance machine were made in 1998 based on a concept by Heinz Rath of integrating a commercial platform with tiller and mine flail tool. The first prototype was constructed by consortium under the leadership of RUAG in the production facilities of AHWI. In 2001 the first platform was developed and tested and the final MineWolf prototype was built and accredited by the German Army in 2004, the same year that MineWolf Systems GmbH was founded. In 2006 a new corporate structure was introduced and MineWolf Systems AG was created. A regional office in Bosnia and Herzegovina opened in 2006 and one year later, the Mini MineWolf (MW240) remote-controlled platform was launched. In 2008 the regional offices in Kenya and Lebanon were opened and MineWolf System's first fully independent production facility in Stockach, Germany established. The Medium MineWolf (MW330) was developed in 2009 to meet specific military requirements for a medium-sized platform. In July 2012, Philipp von Michaelis succeeded Tobias Schmidt as CEO. In early 2013, the smallest platform in its class, the Micro MineWolf (MW50) was launched by Lieutenant General André Blattmann, during the IDEX exhibition in Abu Dhabi. MineWolf went into liquidation in July 2015 due to insolvency. https://app.insolvenz-portal.de/Insolvenzverfahren/minewolf-systems-ag-in-liquidation/2303671 British company Pearson Engineering Ltd announced the acquisition of all IP and Assets of MineWolf AG in February 2016.

The MineWolf platforms are all designed to be fitted with various interchangeable attachments (such as the flail or robotic arm) to clear a range of explosive devices, such as landmines, improvised explosive devices and cluster munitions.

The platforms are used by humanitarian and commercial mine clearance agencies and governments in inter alia Afghanistan, Angola, Bosnia and Herzegovina, Chile, Croatia, Democratic Republic of Congo, Iraq, Jordan, Lebanon, South Sudan, Sudan, Turkey and Western Sahara. They are used by the British Army and the German Bundeswehr for route clearance, i.e. clearing IEDs and mines from routes in Afghanistan and by the United Nations Mine Action Service and MINUSMA peacekeepers for IED clearance in Mali.

== See also ==
- Mine action
- Demining
- Mine clearance agencies
- Geneva International Centre for Humanitarian Demining

== Notes ==
- King, Colin (2011). Jane's Mines and Mine Clearance. pp. 746–749. ISBN 978-0710629784.
