= Superman: Deadly Legacy =

- English-language cover of Superman: Deadly Legacy (1996).

Publication information
- Publisher: DC Comics
- Format: Ongoing series
- Genre: Superhero
- Publication date: 1996
- Main character: Superman

Creative team
- Created by: Jerry Siegel; Joe Shuster

Superman: Deadly Legacy is a special-edition "humanitarian comic book" featuring Superman that promotes "landmine awareness" among children, particularly from countries where there are active landmines after war. The Superman comic book was published by DC Comics, the United States government, and United Nations International Children's Emergency Fund (UNICEF) in 1996. In Superman: Deadly Legacy, Superman – a well-known superhero in the United States and Europe – acts as a teacher educating children about the dangers of landmines. The target countries for disseminating copies of the comic book include Bosnia, the Former Yugoslavia, and Kosovo.

In Bosnia, the free comic book was distributed by a peacekeeping force led by North Atlantic Treaty Organization (NATO) and the Mine Action Center located in Sarajevo.

== Plot ==
In Superman: Deadly Legacy, Superman rescues two Bosnian boys from a minefield and from a booby-trapped house. During one of the events, a dog was wounded by the explosion and did not survive.

== Languages ==
Superman: Deadly Legacy was published in English, Serbian, and Croatian. The Serbo-Croatian comic book had two versions, namely in Latin/Roman and Cyrillic scripts. The Latin script was geared towards Bosnian Muslims and Croats, while the Cyrillic script was for the Serbs.

According to DC Comics president Jenette Kahn, there were plans of publishing a Portuguese version of Superman: Deadly Legacy and Superman and Wonder Woman – the Hidden Killer for dissemination in Angola and Mozambique. Superman and Wonder Woman – the Hidden Killer is a "companion" comic book title published in English and Spanish for Superman: Deadly Legacy for promoting landmine safety. The Superman and Wonder Woman – the Hidden Killer comic book was distributed in Central American countries such as Costa Rica, Honduras, and Nicaragua.

== History ==
One of the initiators of the idea for using the comic book medium as a tool for promoting landmine awareness was then First Lady of the United States Hillary Clinton, after visiting Bosnia and after reviewing a mine awareness coloring book for younger children. Superman became the feature character for the comic book because of his status as a "citizen of the world". Another initiator of the concept of publishing Superman: Deadly Legacy as a mine-awareness project was Madeleine Albright, a former chief of delegates of the United States at the United Nations. Albright contacted American singer Judy Collins, then a special envoy of UNICEF. Collins, in turn, reached out to Jeanette Kahn at DC Comics through Warner Bros. The project was assigned to Matthew Lorin, a Director on the National Security Council (NSC) Staff in the Directorate for Democracy, Human Rights and Humanitarian Affairs who was the NSC point for PSYOPS and Information Campaigns in Bosnia. In Bosnia, the project was led by the IFOR Information Campaign based in Sarajevo. The images depicted in the comic were based on actual images from the area around Sarajevo, taken by SGT Paul Panzer and MAJ Nick Swayne. DC Comics is a division of Warner Bros.

== See also ==
- Superman and Wonder Woman - the Hidden Killer
- Batman: Death of Innocents
- Mine action
- Mine clearance agencies
- International Campaign to Ban Landmines (ICBL)
