= Holder v. Humanitarian Law Project =

- Supreme Court of the United States

Argued February 23, 2010 Decided June 21, 2010
- Full case name: Holder et al. v. Humanitarian Law Project et al.
- Docket no.: 08-1498
- Citations: 561 U.S. 1 (more) 130 S. Ct. 2705; 177 L. Ed. 2d 355

Case history
- Prior: Humanitarian Law Project v. Mukasey, 552 F.3d 916 (9th Cir. 2009)

Holding
- The federal government may prohibit providing non-violent material support for terrorist organizations, including legal services and advice, without violating the free speech clause of the First Amendment.

Court membership
- Chief Justice John Roberts Associate Justices John P. Stevens · Antonin Scalia; Anthony Kennedy · Clarence Thomas; Ruth Bader Ginsburg · Stephen Breyer; Samuel Alito · Sonia Sotomayor

Case opinions
- Majority: Roberts, joined by Stevens, Scalia, Kennedy, Thomas, Alito
- Dissent: Breyer, joined by Ginsburg, Sotomayor

Laws applied
- U.S. Const. amend. I; 18 U.S.C. § 2339B

Holder v. Humanitarian Law Project, 561 U.S. 1 (2010), was a case decided in June 2010 by the Supreme Court of the United States regarding the Patriot Act's prohibition on providing material support to foreign terrorist organizations (18 U.S.C. § 2339B). The case, petitioned by United States Attorney General Eric Holder, represents one of only two times in First Amendment jurisprudence that a restriction on political speech has overcome strict scrutiny. The other is Williams-Yulee v. Florida Bar.

In a 6-3 opinion, the Supreme Court ruled against the Humanitarian Law Project, which sought to help the Kurdistan Workers' Party in Turkey and Sri Lanka's Liberation Tigers of Tamil Eelam learn how to resolve conflicts peacefully. It concluded that the US Congress had intended to prevent aid to such groups, even for the purpose of facilitating peace negotiations or United Nations processes because that assistance fit the law's definition of material aid as "training", "expert advice or assistance", "service", and "personnel". The finding was based on the principle that any assistance could help to "legitimate" the terrorist organization and free up its resources for terrorist activities.

The court noted that the proposed actions of the Humanitarian Law Project were general and "entirely hypothetical" and implied that a post-enforcement challenge to the application of the "material support" provisions was not prevented.

== Background ==
=== Providing material support for terrorism ===
Providing material support is a crime prosecuted under 18 U.S.C. § 2339B a section created after the Antiterrorism and Effective Death Penalty Act of 1996 (AEDPA) was signed into law by former President Bill Clinton. Following the September 11 attacks and the 2001 anthrax attacks, the Patriot Act was signed into law in order to counteract terrorism in the United States. The Patriot Act expanded material support to include "monetary instruments and expert advice and assistance."

"Material support" is defined broadly as including: financial services, lodging, training, expert advice or assistance, false documentation, communications equipment, facilities, weapons, personnel, transportation.

=== Beginnings of the Case ===
This case started as a preventative suit, brought forth by plaintiffs, specifically, "the Humanitarian Law Project (HLP) (a human rights organization with consultative status to the United Nations); Ralph Fertig (the HLP’s president, and a retired administrative law judge); Nagalingam Jeyalingam (a Tamil physician, born in Sri Lanka and a naturalized U. S. citizen); and five nonprofit groups dedicated to the interests of persons of Tamil descent."

== Supreme Court ==
=== Argument ===
The plaintiffs brought the material-support statute up as unconstitutional according to the first amendment. Specifically, the plaintiffs claimed that violated their protections of free speech.

=== Opinion of the Court ===
All nine justices agreed that the material support as defined by 18 U.S.C. § 2339B was not unconstitutionally vague. This decision did not overturn any precedents, and there was a general sentiment that this decision did not apply in all cases where the statute could've been applied.

=== Dissenting opinions ===
Justice Stephen G. Breyer dissented, along with Justices Ruth Bader Ginsburg and Sonia Sotomayor. The basis for their dissent was not the unconstitutional vagueness of "material support," but rather that there was not enough evidence to prove that the activist speech which the plaintiff brought forth posed a direct compelling threat of terrorism.

== Subsequent Developments ==
Overall, this case has been interpreted by various scholars as an emphasis on how the emphasis on preventing terrorism can prove to be greater than protecting free speech. Many critics point to how this decision criminalizes acts of peaceful support to oversees organizations. It's a decision that continues to shape discussions on the first amendment.

=== Reception ===
Former President Jimmy Carter criticized the decision and argued:

The "material support law" – which is aimed at putting an end to terrorism – actually threatens The Carter Center's work and the work of many other peacemaking organizations that must interact directly with groups that have engaged in violence. The vague language of the law leaves us wondering if we will be prosecuted for our work to promote peace and freedom.

Élisabeth Decrey Warner, the president of the Swiss NGO Geneva Call, also expressed her disapproval by stating, "Civilians caught in the middle of conflicts and hoping for peace will suffer from this decision. How can you start peace talks or negotiations if you don't have the right to speak to both parties?"

In January 2011, David D. Cole, a professor of law at Georgetown University Law Center, who argued the case for the Humanitarian Law Project, commented on developments since the decision. He noted that several prominent former officeholders, including Rudolph Giuliani and Tom Ridge, had spoken in support of the People's Mujahedin of Iran, an Iranian opposition group calling for democracy in Iran that was previously placed in the United States FTO list as a "goodwill gesture" to the Iranian government. He stated that he supported their right to speak but that even nonviolent advocacy, such as urging a designation as "terrorist" to be revoked, was illegal under the Supreme Court decision. He also pointed to exemptions granted under the rubric of "humanitarian aid" that turned out to include products like cigarettes and chewing gum. He stated, "Under current law, it seems, the right to make profits is more sacrosanct than the right to petition for peace, and the need to placate American businesses more compelling than the need to provide food and shelter to earthquake victims and war refugees."

The linguist Noam Chomsky criticized the decision as an issue of freedom of speech and stated that it was "the first major attack on freedom of speech in the United States since the notorious Smith Act back around 1940." He also stated that it had troubling legal implications since Humanitarian Law Project gave out advice to PKK to urge the group to pursue nonviolence.

The magazine Mother Jones stated that "the Supreme Court ruled that even protected speech can be a criminal act if it occurs at the direction of a terrorist organization." It went on to say that people "could be convicted of materially supporting terrorism merely for translating a document or putting an extremist video online, depending on [their] intentions."

Representatives of the International Red Cross and Red Crescent Movement stated that the ruling would probably not affect its operations or its relationship with the US government.

== Implementation ==
In September 2010, the FBI raided activists in Minneapolis and Chicago; seized computers, cellphones and files; and issued subpoenas to some targeted individuals to appear before a federal grand jury. The FBI agents were seeking evidence of ties to groups deemed by the US government to be foreign terrorist organizations, including the Revolutionary Armed Forces of Colombia and the Popular Front for the Liberation of Palestine. Attorneys linked the raids to the Holder decision.

== See also ==
- Anti-terrorism legislation
- Freedom of speech in the United States
- Incitement to terrorism
- List of United States Supreme Court cases, volume 561
