= Batman: Death of Innocents: the Horror of Landmines =

1996 DC Comics book

Batman
- Cover of Batman: Death of Innocents: the Horror of Landmines (1996).

Publication information
- Publisher: DC Comics
- Format: Ongoing series
- Genre: Superhero
- Main character: Bruce Wayne/Batman

Creative team
- Created by: Bob Kane; Bill Finger
- Written by: Dennis O'Neil
- Penciller: Joe Staton
- Inker: Bill Sienkiewicz
- Letterer: John Costanza
- Colorist: Ian Laughlin

Batman: Death of Innocents: the Horror of Landmines is a comic book published by DC Comics in 1996. The graphic novel was authored by Dennis O'Neil, Joe Staton, Bill Sienkiewicz, and Ian Laughlin. O'Neill wrote the story, Staton was the penciller, Sienkiewicz was the inker, and Laughlin was the colorist. The purpose for publishing this particular Batman comic book was to teach the people of the United States regarding the dangers and consequences of landmines worldwide, left active in countries that had been at war. The publication of this Batman comic book title was influenced by two other similarly themed comic books featuring Superman and Wonder Woman, namely Superman: Deadly Legacy and Superman and Wonder Woman - the Hidden Killer (both were intended for readers who are outside the United States, particularly Costa Rica, Honduras, Nicaragua, Bosnia, the Former Yugoslavia, and Kosovo).

== Structure ==
Batman: Death of Innocents has multiple sections, with the body of the work being the 49-page comic story about Batman's battle against a formidable enemy – the landmines. That story is prefaced by Senator Patrick Leahy's two-page introduction, and followed by a coda of three essays written by people who have personal experience with landmines.

Contents
"The Innocent Victims of Landmines" (preface) by Senator Patrick Leahy
"Death of Innocents" (comic story) by Dennis O'Neil, Joe Staton & Bill Sienkiewicz
"Landmines The Indiscriminate Killers" (essay) by Col. David H. Hackworth
"Landmines – We Must Ban Them Now!" (essay) by Jody Williams
"Landmine Victims Need Your Help" (essay) by Jerry White

== Description and summary ==
Although the comic book does not mention the publisher's stance regarding the morality of any war, Batman: Death of Innocents tackles how Bruce Wayne – as Batman – goes to Kravia, a fictitious country that experienced a civil war. Batman learned that one of his Wayne Enterprises (also known as WayneCorp, a company owned by Bruce Wayne) staff – named Ted Orbley – was killed by a landmine that was placed on the road by anti-Kravian government rebels. Before the tragic event, Ted Orbley brought with him to Kravia his daughter (Sarah Orbley) and a friend of his daughter (Mariska). Ted Orbley was working on an irrigation project for Wayne Enterprises. Ted Orbley was not the only one who died in the explosion, but Mariska was also killed by the blast. Sarah was left alone in Kravia in the hands of rebels. Ted Orbley's wife meets with Bruce Wayne and asks that Sarah Orbley be rescued by Wayne Enterprises. Batman searches for Sarah and finds her, but while he and Sarah are waiting for an air transport that will pick them up and take them out of Kravia, Sarah picks up a toy on the ground that is similar to a yo-yo, but the toy is not a yo-yo. The plaything is actually a landmine, designed to look like a toy. Sarah dies from the explosion.

== See also ==
- Mine action
- Mine clearance agencies
- International Campaign to Ban Landmines (ICBL)
