= Gender mainstreaming in mine action =

Application for mine action

Gender mainstreaming in mine action is the application of gender mainstreaming to mine action. It is increasingly being adopted by international and state mine action organizations.

== General ==
Gender mainstreaming in mine action is derived from the fact that women and men often have different roles and responsibilities within their communities or families and consequently different decision-making power, mobility patterns, information and control over resources. The different positions of men and women have an influence on their exposure to landmines and explosive remnants of war (ERW), their ability to access medical and psychological services once they have been injured by mines, their chances of long term reintegration in society, and the likelihood of them to be included in risk education.

As a result, organizations employ gender mainstreaming in mine action by assessing the implications for women and men in all aspects of the mine action activities. Gender mainstreaming in mine action attempts to ensure women and men benefit equally from mine action and that gender inequality is not perpetuated which might impede the overall effectiveness of mine action programmes.

== History ==
Women's advancement instruments in national bureaucracies started in the mid-1970s. While the concept of gender mainstreaming appeared in the mid-1980s, it was formalised in the early 1990s. Gender mainstreaming in mine action was first mentioned in 1995 at the Beijing Platform for Action in the section on armed conflict, by stating that "women and children are particularly affected by the indiscriminate use of anti-personnel land-mines". Gender mainstreaming in mine action was part of a larger movement to end discrimination and mainstream gender in security sector reform. Before guidelines on how to integrate gender into mine action were standardised, several documents were published to highlight the importance of gender mainstreaming in that domain.

It later gained more support thanks to the UN Security Council Resolution 1325 (2000) on "Women, Peace and Security" which emphasised "the need for all parties to ensure that mine clearance and mine awareness programmes take into account the special needs of women and girls". In 2005 the UN Gender Guidelines for Mine Action Programmes provided the first comprehensive description of how to mainstream gender in mine action, afterwards revised in 2010. This guide is a manual destined to be used by the UN mine action field-based personnel and headquarters' staff and other actors involved in the sector.

=== Convention and Normative Documents on Gender Mainstreaming in Mine Action ===
The Convention on Cluster Munition (2008) underlines that "Each State Party with respect to cluster munition victims (…) shall (…) adequately provide age- and gender-sensitive assistance".

The Vientiane Action Plan 2010-2015 (2010), adopted at the First Meeting of States Parties to the Convention on Cluster Munition in Lao PDR also includes gender issues in several action points, such as on Clearance and destruction of cluster munition remnants and risk reduction activities. For instance, Action 14 writes that there should be "gender-sensitive participation of the community to the development of national clearance plans, planning and prioritisation of clearance activities and land release". Action 17 states that "mine risk education should be tailored to the needs of affected communities, gender sensitive and age appropriate". In addition to the previous two, Action 22 requires states to collect sex and age disaggregated data on victims, and Action 30 that victims should be fully included in the work of the convention in a gender and age sensitive way.

The Strategy of the United Nation on Mine Action 2013-2018 (2013) encourages "further efforts (…) dedicated to strengthening and mainstreaming gender perspectives in mine action planning, implementation and evaluation".

The Maputo Action Plan 2014-2019 (2014) was adopted during the Third Review Conference of the States Parties to the Convention on the Prohibition of the use, stockpiling, production and transfer of anti-personnel mines and on their destruction (APMBC 1997). In its introduction, it stresses that States Parties will implement the Maputo Action Plan in a cooperative, inclusive, age-appropriate and gender-sensitive manner. In the section on mine clearance, gender-sensitive mine risk education (paragraph 10), opportunities and social protection measures for all mine victims, regardless of their gender and age (paragraph 10) and gender sensitive awareness raising (paragraph 17) are mentioned. The section on International cooperation and assistance encourages State parties to articulate age- and gender-sensitive time-bound objectives and targets (paragraph 21) and to support programmes that provide accurate gender sensitive information and that promote gender mainstreaming (paragraph 22).

The International Mine Action Standards (IMAS) were created in 2001 and are under constant revision. They provide procedures and concrete steps to follow all UN mine action operations. However, they are also the main guide for operators and national mine action programmes to establish their own National Mine Action Standards (NMAS). After the revision of IMAS in 2009, the dimension of gender was included in several of them, concerning land release and handover (IMAS 07.11); Mine Risk Education (IMAS 04.10 and IMAS 12.10); non-technical surveys (IMAS 08.10).

=== Examples of Gender Mainstreaming in Mine Action ===
Since 2006 the United Nations Mine Action Service (UNMAS) has been conducting workshops on gender mainstreaming in mine action both in the field and in Geneva at the presence of representatives of mine action organisation, focused on explaining what gender mainstreaming is and helping countries implementing the UN guidelines.

The Swiss Campaign to Ban Landmines created the Gender and Mine Action Programme in 2006 to specifically focus on the implementation of gender mainstreaming in mine action.

The Swedish International Development Cooperation Agency (SIDA) in 2013 reviewed the work of the Danish Demining Group (DDG) in Afghanistan, assessing positively the progress made in gender mainstreaming, in terms of the collection of disaggregated qualitative and quantitative data, in spite of some cultural limitations.

The Mine Action Programme of Afghanistan (MAPA) has developed a Gender Mainstreaming Strategy for the period 2014-2016 with the assistance of the Gender and Mine Action Programme (GMAP). In order to share the strategy, the Mine Action Coordination Centre of Afghanistan (MACCA) organised two gender mainstreaming workshops at the end of 2014 attended by 17 partner organisations in the context of a grant provided by the Geneva International Centre for Humanitarian Demining (GICHD)

The Mine Advisory Group (MAG) – Lao PDR, through a funding from MAG and Irish Aid, conducted an assessment as part of gender mainstreaming on the priority actions to be carried out in integrating gender in mine action.

== Strategies ==
The UN Gender Guidelines for Mine Action Programmes explain how to integrate gender into four of the five pillars of mine action.

=== Mine clearance ===
The UN Gender Guidelines state that men, women, boys and girls differ in their exposure to and knowledge of the mine contamination. The Guidelines write that mine-action operators should obtain information about the mine situation from both sexes in all age groups in order for information to be complete and accurate before demining. Having more accurate information before can reduce costs because less time and money are spent on demining uncontaminated areas. Its concrete recommendations are:

- Gather data at the best times and locations for all individuals.
- Gather data from both men and women about the location of explosive devices and the projected use of cleared land.
- Also include women into the survey and clearance teams.

=== Mine-risk education (MRE) ===
The UN Gender Guidelines say that men, women, boys and girls differ in their behaviours and their response to mine-risk education. Its recommendations are:

- Gather data that illustrate the behaviours that put at risk people of both genders.
- Gather data that indicates how people of both genders would react to potential mine and UXO threats.
- Determine the best instructor for both genders.
- Hold MRE meetings at the most convenient times and places for recipients.
- Ensure that both genders understand properly MRE messages.
- Have women as instructors.

=== Victim assistance ===
For victim assistance, the guidelines explains that women and men have often different access to victim assistance due to cultural barriers and other obstacles. It states that mine action organisations should consider these barriers and their vulnerability to the economic, psychological and social implications of disability. The Guidelines' recommendations are:

- Collect age- and sex-disaggregated data about victims, their needs and the level of access to services.
- Support survivor advocacy and awareness.
- Include women into victim assistance teams to ensure access to female victims in conservative contexts.

=== Advocacy ===
In terms of advocacy, the guidelines state that women and men have different sensibilities to messages and access to communication channels. Mine action organisations have to consider these peculiarities in planning advocacy activities. Its recommendations are:

- Tailor advocacy initiatives to women, girls, boys and men
- Convey information on the benefits of compliance with international legal norms addressing the mine/ERW problem and victim assistance
- Encourage advocacy activities among women, girls, boys and men in mine/ERW-affected communities

== Gender and Mine Action Programme (GMAP) ==
The Gender and Mine Action Programme (GMAP) is a programme of the Geneva International Centre for Humanitarian Demining (GICHD) that strives for and contributes to increasing the effectiveness of mine action activities through the inclusion of a gender and diversity perspective in policy making, programming, and implementation. GMAP was created in December 2006 by the Swiss Campaign to Ban Landmines. Before its integration in the GICHD in March 2019, GMAP worked as an independent organization for more than 12 years, aiming to promote gender mainstreaming in mine action by trying to make mine action include the needs, priorities, and knowledge of women, girls, boys, men, and members of marginalized groups in communities at risk of landmines or other UXO. The goal of gender and diversity mainstreaming is to make mine action more inclusive, efficient and effective. The goal of the Programme is to research, provide training and consultation, create guidelines and strategies, create awareness, and publish material related to gender and diversity in mine action. They also support hiring more women in mine action including mine clearance. It was hosted in the offices of the Geneva International Centre for Humanitarian Demining (GICHD) in Geneva, Switzerland for 9 years before its official integration in the GICHD. GMAP is part of a Gender and Diversity in Security Hub with other security organizations at the Maison de la Paix in Geneva: Geneva Centre for the Democratic Control of Armed Forces (DCAF), Geneva International Centre for Humanitarian Demining (GICHD), Geneva Centre for Security Policy (GCSP), and Small Arms Survey (SAS).

== Criticism ==
Like many criticisms of the gender mainstreaming movement in general, gender mainstreaming in mine action has faced similar problems such as ineffective results, poor implementation, those using it to hinder progress, and being primarily western dominated. Asa Massleberg, for the Gender and Mine Action Programme, wrote that the common measurements of success in mine action, such as meters squared of land cleared of mines and number of people who received a service, are insufficient because they do not take into account the overall and long term impact of a community. She argues it can only be done by assessing all the processes and procedures in a project cycle which are adapted to the needs of women, girls, boy and men in a community. According to the Gender and Mine Action Programme, the effects of gender mainstreaming are still largely undocumented, not understood by those implementing it, and require further research. Trying to deal with other biases not included in gender mainstreaming, the Gender and Mine Action Programme has also expanded gender mainstreaming to include the term diversity. Gender and diversity mainstreaming includes other factors in the demographics of a community that may hinder or help the long term impact of mine action.

== See also ==
- Cluster Munition Coalition
- Gender
- Gender and Security Sector Reform
- Geneva International Centre for Humanitarian Demining
- International Campaign to Ban Landmines
- Land mine
- Unexploded ordnance
- United Nations Mine Action Service
