= Élisabeth Decrey Warner =

Élisabeth Decrey Warner née Reusse-Decrey (born 1953) is a Swiss peace activist and politician. In 1998 she founded the humanitarian organization Geneva Call which set out to involve armed non-State actors in banning the use of landmines. She served as the organization's executive president until late 2017. Decrey Warner has been widely recognized for her peace efforts. She was nominated for Switzerland as one of the 1,000 women for the Nobel Peace Prize in 2005, in 2012 she was awarded the Hessian Peace Prize, and in 2013 she received the French Legion of Honour.

== Biography ==
Born in Lausanne on 16 October 1953, Elisabeth Reusse-Decrey was raised in the Haute-Nendaz municipality in the Canton of Valais. She initially worked as a ski instructor but then trained as a physiotherapist. From 1989 to 2001, she represented the Social Democratic Party on the Grand Council of Geneva, serving as vice-president from 18 November 1999 and president from 16 November 2000 to 1 November 2001.

In 1997, Reusse-Decrey was a member of the Swiss delegation sent to Ottawa in 1997 to sign the United Nations Anti-Personnel Mine Ban Convention. Believing that the treaty should be supplemented by the possibility of negotiating with armed non-State actors, in 1998 she founded the NGO Geneva Call. The organization embarked on meaningful activities with the Swiss Campaign to Ban Landmines in March 2000.

Decrey Warner remained the organization's executive director until November 2017 when she resigned in favour of Alain Délétroz.

Decrey Warner has served on the boards of several related organizations, including the Geneva Centre for Security Sector Governance, the Geneva International Centre for Humanitarian Demining and the Geneva Centre for Security Policy. She is also a board member of the French organization Leaders pour la Paix and of Terre des hommes in Switzerland.

== Marriage ==
In 2007, Reusse-Decrey married the American-born Daniel Warner, director of the CIG (Centre pour la gouvernance internationale) at the Graduate Institute of International and Development Studies in Geneva. The couple have six children.

== Awards ==
Élisabeth Decrey Warner has received several awards including the following:

- 2005: nominated for Switzerland as one of the 1,000 women for the Nobel Peace Prize in 2005
- 2012: Hessian Peace Prize
- 2013: French Legion of Honour
- 2015: honorary doctorate, University of Geneva

== See also ==
- List of peace activists
