= Gender and security sector reform =

Gender and security sector reform is an emerging subfield of security sector reform (SSR) that is both practical and conceptual. SSR generally is a comprehensive framework within which all or part of a state's security sector undergoes a process of transformation in order to bring it more into line with principles such as democratic oversight, good governance and the rule of law. The overall objectives of SSR programmes – as defined both by the state in question and any international donors supporting the process – tend to include improving service delivery, enhancing local ownership and ensuring the sustainability of security sector institutions. As gender-specific approaches take into account the specific needs of men, women, boys and girls through gender mainstreaming and by promoting the equal participation of people of all genders in decision-making processes, states and international organisations increasingly consider them to be a necessary component of SSR programmes.

== Historical background ==
The need to integrate gender into SSR processes was recognised at the international level in 2008 by then-United Nations (UN) Secretary-General Kofi Annan in his report on SSR, where he stated that: "...the integration of a gender perspective in security sector reform is inherent to an inclusive and socially responsive approach to security. Gender-sensitive security sector reform", he went on, "is key to developing security sector institutions that are non-discriminatory, representative of the population and capable of effectively responding to the specific security needs of diverse groups." Since the release of this report, the number of SSR programmes incorporating a gender dimension has increased dramatically, as has the amount of academic literature available and the number of specialists working in the area. Gender dimensions are often included in SSR processes as part of a country's commitment to UN Security Council Resolution 1325 (2000) (UNSCR 1325), which calls for wider female participation in all aspects of post-conflict reconstruction and for more consideration of the specific needs of women and girls. For example, Liberia's National Action Plan on UNSCR 1325 makes provisions for strengthening the capacity of the SSR desk at the Ministry for Gender and Development.

In 2012, a decade after UNSCR 1325 began to be implemented, the Security Council highlighted "the importance of addressing sexual violence in armed conflict and post-conflict situations in the context of security sector reform initiatives and arrangements, including training, vetting, and capacity-building of national security actors." In addition, a US representative on the Security Council noted that the "integration of a gender perspective made institutions more inclusive and improved the overall effectiveness of security sector reform."

== Rationale ==
=== Effective service delivery ===
One of the key tenets of SSR is that the security sector should be designed to serve the security and justice needs of the population. A person's gender (along with other characteristics, such as age, class, ethnicity/clan/tribe/caste, and sexual orientation) plays an important part in his or her own security needs. Worldwide, women, men, girls and boys have different experiences in areas such as sexual violence, trafficking in human beings, gang violence, robbery, dowry deaths, abduction and so-called 'honour killings'. For example, over 90 percent of deaths related to firearms are male, whereas in most countries, the proportion of women with male intimate partners who experience physical violence during the course of their relationship lies between one-quarter and one-half. Around the world, women, men, girls and boys also have different access to resources such as land, money, education, healthcare and political power. Women own less than 15 percent of land worldwide and only 2 percent in the developing world.

For this reason, gender perspectives are a useful tool to achieving the security sector's objectives. For example, in order to encourage women who have been victims of SGBV to report the crime, it may be important to give them the option of speaking to a woman police officer, perhaps in a specialized police station. In cases where men are affected by SGBV, similar provisions may also be needed, as well as training for security sector personnel who may not be aware of the existence and extent of gender-based violence committed against men. In both cases, an effective response will usually also involve public awareness campaigns highlighting the problem and the services available to survivors. It will probably also include forming partnerships between security providers (e.g. police, justice institutions and prisons), health care providers and civil society organisations, as part of a holistic approach to SSR.

More broadly, collaboration between security sector institutions and civil society groups involved in gender issues can increase the effectiveness of the security sector. Such groups can deliver training, support policy development, and on an ongoing basis provide complementary security and justice services and keep security forces informed about issues within communities.

A further gendered aspect of effective service delivery centres around the skills of security sector personnel themselves. Other societal factors tend to result in men and women having different skill sets. Consequently, if security sector institutions lack either male and female staff at any level, their staff will possess a smaller skill set, limiting their operational options. For example, studies in the USA found that American female police officers were more adept at policing without the use of excessive or deadly force than their male counterparts, although they were as likely to use force as men when absolutely necessary. As a result, male police officers cost US taxpayers between 2.5 and 5.5 times more in legal fees related to excessive force liability lawsuit payouts and are almost three times more likely to be threatened or attacked by citizens. Despite the proven ability of women to increase the skill set of police forces, the closest any police force has come to achieving gender balance is Estonia, where 33.5% of officers are female.

Fourthly, certain security roles might for cultural reasons only be able to be performed by personnel of a particular gender, requiring both male and female personnel for effective operations. For example, in many cultures it is inappropriate for a male police officer or soldier to search a woman. Likewise, in intelligence-gathering, civilians may only be willing to speak with security sector personnel of a certain gender.

=== Local ownership ===
Local ownership has been recognised as a key pillar in ensuring that SSR is both implemented correctly and sustainable. Local ownership of SSR is characterised by "the reform of security policies, institutions and activities in a given country must be designed, managed and implemented by local actors rather than external actors" and is notably distinct from local support for donor programmes and projects. Given that security and justice needs vary by gender, it is important to ensure that people of different genders are consulted and involved in an SSR process. In practice, this can be achieved by involving women's groups, youth groups and other organisations that work on gender-related security issues such as human trafficking, gang violence and human rights. Such groups can serve as a crucial bridge between local communities and SSR policymakers, strengthening local ownership through communicating security and justice needs to policymakers and raising awareness of SSR in local communities.

=== Oversight and accountability ===
Improving oversight and accountability of the security sector can ensure the sustainability of SSR by building trust among the population and by deterring security sector personnel from abusing their power. To be effective, it is essential that security sector oversight bodies and accountability mechanisms (parliaments, national human rights institutions, complaints bodies, local security fora etc.) adopt a gendered perspective. This involves both giving particular attention to the different types of violations committed by security sector personnel against people of different genders, and monitoring the quality of services delivered to people of different genders. Involving gender experts, women's groups and other civil society organisations that work on gender issues in oversight bodies and accountability processes is helpful.

== International frameworks ==
Gender and SSR at both national and international levels takes place within a well-elaborated legal framework.

=== Convention on the Elimination of All Forms of Discrimination against Women (CEDAW) (1979) ===
CEDAW holds states responsible for ending discrimination against women, which it defines in Article 1 as "any distinction, exclusion or restriction made on the basis of sex which has the effect or purpose of impairing or nullifying the recognition, enjoyment or exercise by women, irrespective of their marital status, on a basis of equality of men and women, of human rights and fundamental freedoms in the political, economic, social, cultural, civil or any other field." States parties agree to do this using measures such as reviewing their national legislation to remove discriminatory laws and to criminalize discrimination against women, creating national tribunals or institutions to eliminate discrimination or by implementing policies.

=== Beijing Declaration and Platform for Action (1995) ===
The Beijing Declaration and the Platform for Action resulted from the Fourth World Conference on Women and aimed to promote the advancement and empowerment of women. Areas related to SSR include calls on governments to ensure access to free or low-cost legal services, to aim for gender balance in nominations to international, judicial and governmental bodies and to develop comprehensive human rights education programmes for the public, public officials (notably within the police, military, prison system, government, judiciary and all those working in positions related to migration).

=== UNSCR 1325 on Women Peace and Security (2000) ===
UNSCR 1325 was a landmark resolution in that it recognised the disproportionate impact of armed conflict on civilian women and children, whether they are targeted (e.g. rape as an instrument of war) or indirectly affected (e.g. forced migration). It also recognised contributions women make to conflict prevention, resolution and post-conflict reconstruction and called for greater inclusion of women in processes related to peace and security. It mandated a policy of gender mainstreaming in all UN peacekeeping operations, which often include support to SSR processes.

=== UNSCR 1820 (2008) ===
UNSCR 1820 sought to address the issue of sexual violence against women and girls during conflict by explicitly mandating the participation of women in "all disarmament, demobilization, and reintegration processes, and in justice and security sector reform efforts assisted by the United Nations".

=== UNSCRs 1888 and 1889 (2009) ===
UNSCR 1888 builds on 1820 by mandating that sexual violence also be addressed in peace processes and calls for the deployment of experts and a Special Representative of Sexual Violence in Conflict. UNSCR 1889 calls for an increased role for women at the top levels of mediation as well as mandating the UN to collect gender-segregated data on all activities related to peace and security.

=== UNSCR 1960 (2010) ===
UNSCR 1960 encourages the inclusion of women in police, civil and military functions during peacekeeping missions.

=== UNSCR 2106 (2013) ===
UNSCR 2106 requests relevant UN entities to assist national authorities in addressing sexual violence, with effective participation of women, in SSR and justice sector reform processes, specifically through training, increasing female recruitment and implementing vetting processes that exclude perpetrators of sexual violence from serving in security institutions.

== Methods and strategies ==
The following two complementary strategies can be used to integrate gender issues into SSR policy and programming:

=== Gender mainstreaming ===
Gender mainstreaming is "the process of assessing the implications for women and men of any planned action, including legislation, policies or programmes, in all areas and at all levels. It is a strategy for making women's as well as men's concerns and experiences an integral dimension of the design, implementation, monitoring and evaluation of policies and programmes in all political, economic and societal spheres so that women and men benefit equally and inequality is not perpetuated. The ultimate goal is to achieve gender equality." In the context of SSR, gender mainstreaming involves considering the impact all aspects of the programme at all stages of the programming cycle in light of the different security needs of women, men, boys and girls. To achieve this, all data collected should be gender disaggregated. It may result in gender initiatives – such as gender training for security sector personnel and gender budget analysis to ensure that resources are being distributed equally: It may also result in initiatives aimed at men, women, boys or girls – such as mentoring schemes to facilitate the professional development of female police officers, providing access to justice for male civilian victims of wartime sex-selective massacres, policy measures to prevent the enslavement of boys and ensuring the inclusion of former female child soldiers in disarmament, demobilisation and reintegration (DDR) programmes.

=== Promoting the equal participation of men and women ===
Sometimes known as gender balance, promoting the equal participation of men and women in SSR processes and security sector institutions is a method of strengthening local ownership as well as increasing representation and effectiveness. In relation to SSR processes, this may involve ensuring that women and men are equally involved in SSR needs assessment, monitoring and evaluation, and that representatives of women (such as from the ministry responsible for women, or from civil society) participate in SSR policy- and decision-making. In relation to security sector institutions, because men are over-represented, promoting equal participation generally involves increasing the recruitment, retention and advancement of women. Doing so may require developing policies for security sector institutions that allow personnel to perform socially-expected gender roles (e.g. flexible working hours for parents. Some countries have attempted to promote equal participation by introducing gender quotas. In the Liberian National Police, for example, a quota that at least 20% of new recruits must be women succeeded in rapidly increasing female participation.

== Country contexts ==
While all gender and SSR processes share many overarching objectives, the kinds of activities carried out on the ground will vary significantly depending upon the context in which they take place.

=== Post-conflict countries ===
The focus of many gender and SSR efforts in post-conflict settings is on stemming heightened levels of SGBV, particularly against women and children, that tend to persist due to high levels of available weapons, trauma and a lack of economic opportunities for former-combatants and young adults (especially men) who feel marginalised. Men, women, girls and boys all have important roles to play in re-establishing civil society. However, as there is often pressure to rebuild security sector institutions as quickly as possible and as male-dominated, militarised command structures may still be in political control of the state, the different needs of the population are often overlooked. Challenges in these settings frequently include integrating gender issues in DDR processes, recruiting more women into newly reconstructed security sector institutions, ensuring access to transitional justice mechanisms for victims of SGBV during the conflict and ensuring that the newly reformed justice institutions take into account the needs of those most at risk from the heightened levels of post-conflict SGBV. However, it should also be emphasised that SSR can be an entry point in post-conflict contexts for overcoming pre-conflict gender-based inequality and insecurity.

=== Transitional countries ===
Transitional countries refer to post-authoritarian contexts which may or may not be accompanied be changes in economic system. They tend to have well-funded and oversized security institutions that are undergoing a shift from serving a regime to serving the population. As such, developing and implementing new working practices whereby the primary objective is to respond to the different security needs of the population may present a challenge for personnel who are used to maintaining order through violent means. In former Eastern Bloc transitional countries, civil society may be weak but in other contexts such as in countries affected by the Arab Spring, civil society may have organised into a broad coalition in order to bring about political change with women's groups playing a leading role. There often is a window of opportunity for civil society to reshape security sector institutions by, for example, integrating gender perspectives. This may also be incentivised by new possibilities for regional cooperation which involve adhering to gender-related minimum standards.

=== Developing countries ===
There is increasing opinion that gender-based violence and discrimination inhibit development as, aside from their negative social and personal consequences, they impair the productivity of those affected to the detriment of the whole economy. Gender-based violence and discrimination also increases the risk of violent conflict breaking out as it can be used as an instrument of warfare to destabilise communities, can inhibit certain groups from participating in post-conflict peacebuilding activities as well as perpetuating an atmosphere of impunity regarding violence in the society. For this reason, gender and SSR is increasingly being implemented by the governments of developing countries with the support of donors and other actors in the international community, who may make the integration of gender a condition for development support. Translating policy into practice is often hindered by the lack of human and financial resources in developing counties. However, civil society organisations are widespread and well-organised in many developing countries providing competent partners for governments and donors in implementing gender and SSR initiatives.

=== Developed countries ===
The term SSR is usually used to refer to processes in post-conflict and transitional countries, where there is often support by third countries and/or international organisations. However, developed countries also engage in SSR activities. Gender and SSR-related activities include efforts to increase the recruitment, retention and advancement of female security sector personnel, improving responses to SGBV, training on how to prevent and respond to SGBV during overseas deployments, strengthening the gender dimensions of oversight and monitoring, and building collaboration with civil society groups concerned with gender issues. The challenges for integrating gender in such contexts tend to revolve around complacency and the emphasis on external threats such as terrorism. Entry points for gender and SSR are often linked to legal obligations under anti-discrimination and human rights legislation, or the need to boost recruitment for operational reasons. For example, following the introduction of the Canadian Human Rights Act (1977), the Canadian Forces were obliged to prove that any discriminatory policies were an operational necessity. After consistently failing to do so in court, the systemic barriers to women's participation in all areas of activity had been lifted by 2001. Social pressure also forced the Canadian Forces to address attitudinal causes of discrimination and SGBV through the establishment of Defense Diversity Councils. Similarly, regional frameworks such as NATO and the Council of Europe can provide impetus and a degree of social pressure for gender and SSR activities in developing countries.

== See also ==
- Gender mainstreaming in mine action
- DCAF (Geneva Centre for the Democratic Control of Armed Forces)
