= Humanitarian Law Project =

U.S.-based non-profit organization

The Humanitarian Law Project (founded 1985) is a U.S.-based non-profit organization, working to protect human rights and promote "the peaceful resolution of conflict by using established international human rights laws and humanitarian law."

The organization was the named party and lead plaintiff in the Supreme Court of the United States case of Holder v. Humanitarian Law Project, 130 S. Ct. 2705 (2010).

The organization's mandate includes the long-term strengthening of human rights standard, particularly those ratified by nation-states, and to promote human rights dialogue between human rights activists, legal academics, members of the US Congress and their staffs, and other interested US citizens.
