= Swiss Campaign to Ban Landmines =

The Swiss Campaign to Ban Landmines (the Swiss Campaign or SCBL) is a member of the International Campaign to Ban Landmines (ICBL). It is an umbrella organisation composed of about 50 Swiss NGOs gathered around the common objective of banning antipersonnel landmines and similar indiscriminate weapons (such as cluster munitions or anti-vehicle landmines). At the national level, the Swiss Campaign to Ban Landmines successfully advocated in favor of a national ban of antipersonnel landmines and of Switzerland’s signature and ratification of the Ottawa Treaty in 1995-1997. Within the ICBL, the Swiss Campaign was a member of the Non State Actors Working Group, which it co-chaired until the end of 2004.

== Activities ==
The Swiss Campaign has also participated in the creation of Geneva Call, which primarily aims at engaging armed non-state actors in a total ban of antipersonnel landmines. Moreover, the Swiss Campaign has supported the creation of other national campaigns of the ICBL, such as the Nepal Campaign to Ban Landmines and more recently, the Turkish Campaign to Ban Landmines. Both these organisations are now independent members of the ICBL. The Swiss Campaign is also a member of the Cluster Munition Coalition and supports current efforts to ban cluster munitions.

== Gender and Mine Action Programme ==
Because mine action programmes and activities do not equally benefit women and men, the SCBL launched a Gender and Mine Action Programme (GMAP) in December 2006. This programme encourages and supports the mine action sector to mainstream gender through its policy, programming and operations. GMAP has been an independent association since June 2011. The general objective of GMAP is to contribute to the reduction of suffering faced by women, men, girls and boys as landmine victims, survivors, families and members of affected communities. This complements current efforts within the United Nations system to mainstream gender throughout mine action projects. GMAP intends to improve mine action effectiveness by increasing awareness on gender and mine action amongst mine action organisations, women's grassroots organisations and other stakeholders. The GMAP is co-located with the Geneva International Centre for Humanitarian Demining in their offices in Geneva, Switzerland.
