= The Journal of Social Studies Research =

- Discipline: Social studies
- Language: English
- Edited by: William B. Russell III

Publication details
- History: 1977–present
- Publisher: Elsevier
- Frequency: Quarterly

Standard abbreviations
- ISO 4: J. Soc. Stud. Res.

Indexing
- ISSN: 0885-985X
- OCLC no.: 961418532

Links
- Journal homepage; Online access; Online archive

The Journal of Social Studies Research is a quarterly peer-reviewed academic journal covering social studies. It is the official publication of The International Society for the Social Studies. The editor-in-chief is William B. Russell III of the University of Central Florida.

== Abstracting and indexing ==
The journal is abstracted and indexed in:

- EBSCO databases
- ERIC
- ProQuest databases
- Scopus
