= Security sector governance and reform =

Process in international development

The concepts of security sector governance and reform (SSG/R, or SSG and SSR) generally refer to a process in Western-based international development and democratization to amend the security sector of a state towards good governance and its principles, such as freedom of information and the rule of law. The security sector governance and reform can be part of international development or democratization. The objective of security sector reform (SSR) is to achieve good security sector governance (SSG)—where security actors are effective and accountable to their people. For example, SSR might guide decision-making on what form should the oversight of armed forces take or how transparent will intelligence agencies be according to legislation. Different nomenclature of the same overall framework include security system reform (SSR), security sector reconstruction (SSR) and justice and security sector reform (JSSR).

== History ==
In 1994, the Organization for Security and Co-operation in Europe (OSCE) adopted a Code of Conduct on Politico-Military Aspects of Security stating that the democratic control of the security sector as essential to stability.

The framework emerged after Saferworld staff observed from examples in South Africa, Indonesia and countries in Eastern Europe that national security and its components were considered crucial in a state recovering from conflict or an authoritarian regime. On 13 May 1998, Clare Short, Secretary of State for International Development, used the term for the first time, publicly, during a speech at the Royal College of Defence Studies. Reportedly, the increasing number of civil wars led development actors to look at the problem of insecurity from the perspective of good governance. The conclusion was that the security sector should adhere to the same rules of good governance as any other public service to curb conflict and violence.

In 2014, the United Nations Security Council (UNSC) adopted its first stand-alone resolution on SSR and within it the role of security sector reform in stabilizing post-conflict countries.

== Scope ==
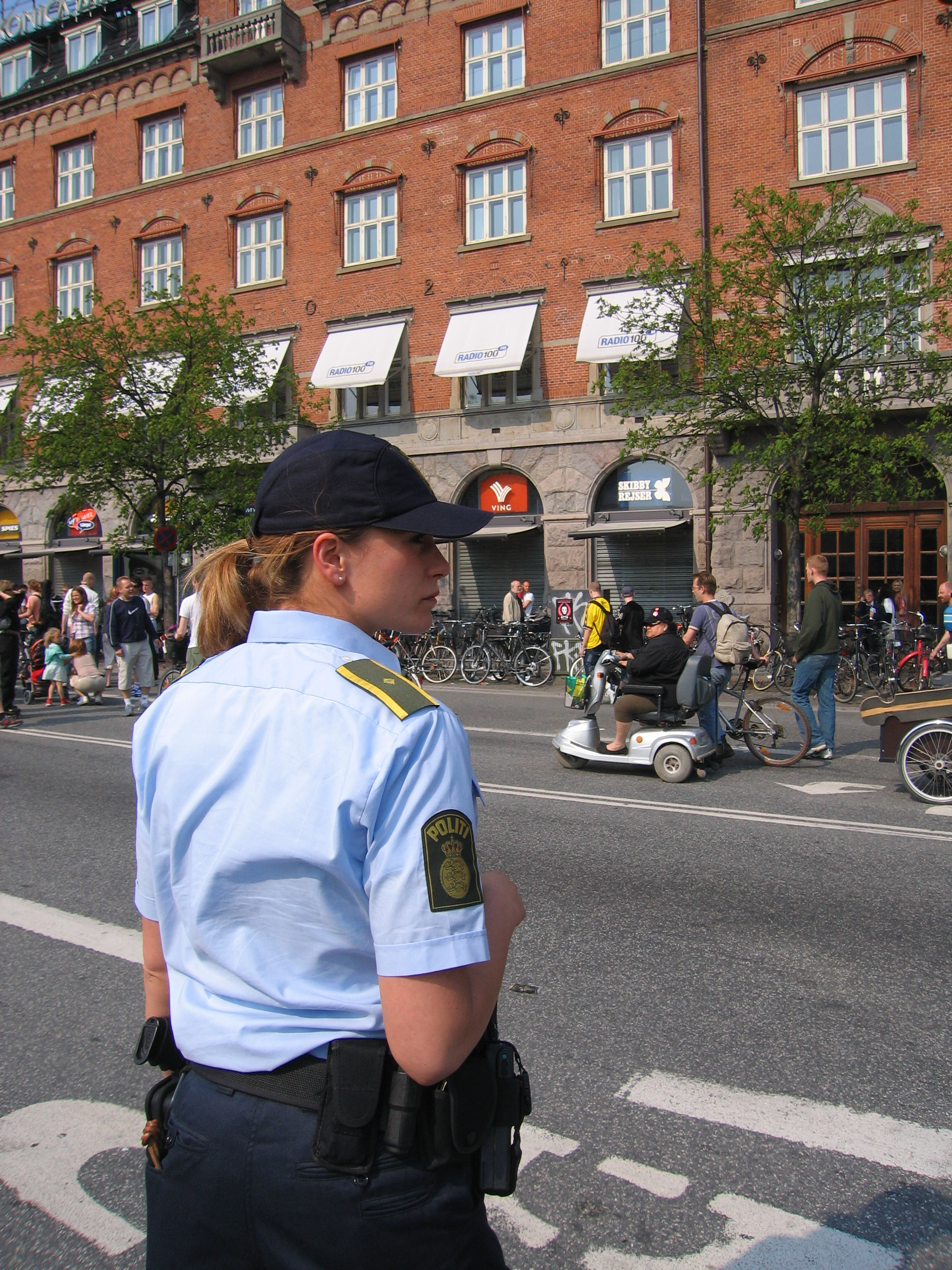
The quality of the service provided by the police, such as the pictured Police of Denmark, is a component of security sector governance and reform.

There is no single globally accepted definition of security sector reform (SSR), but it generally refers to a process to reform or rebuild a state's security sector towards good security sector governance (SSG). Good SSG is usually defined as a number of idealized principles and good practices of a healthy security sector servicing its people. Likewise, the objective of SSR is defined as the application of the same principles of good governance to the security sector as to any other public sector service delivery, such as public health or education. For example, the Development Assistance Committee (DAC) of the Organisation for Economic Co-operation and Development (OECD) has defined four standards that SSR should strive for:

1. Establishment of effective governance, oversight and accountability in the security system; 2) improved delivery of security and justice services; 3) development of local leadership and ownership of the reform process; and 4) sustainability of justice and security service delivery.

The target of SSR are the components of the state that uphold national security. Although the security sector is therefore a wide term open to interpretation, it is generally used to describe the structures, institutions and personnel responsible for the management, provision and oversight of security in a certain country. Therefore, the scope and target of SSR has usually been defined comprising the following two groups:

- State security actors:
  - Armed forces
  - Paramilitary forces
  - Intelligence and secret services
  - Police and gendarmerie
  - Presidential guards
  - Customs services
  - Coast and border guards
- Non-state actors:
  - Private military and security companies (PMSCs)
  - Liberation and guerrilla armies
  - Criminal organizations
  - Political party militias

== Objective ==
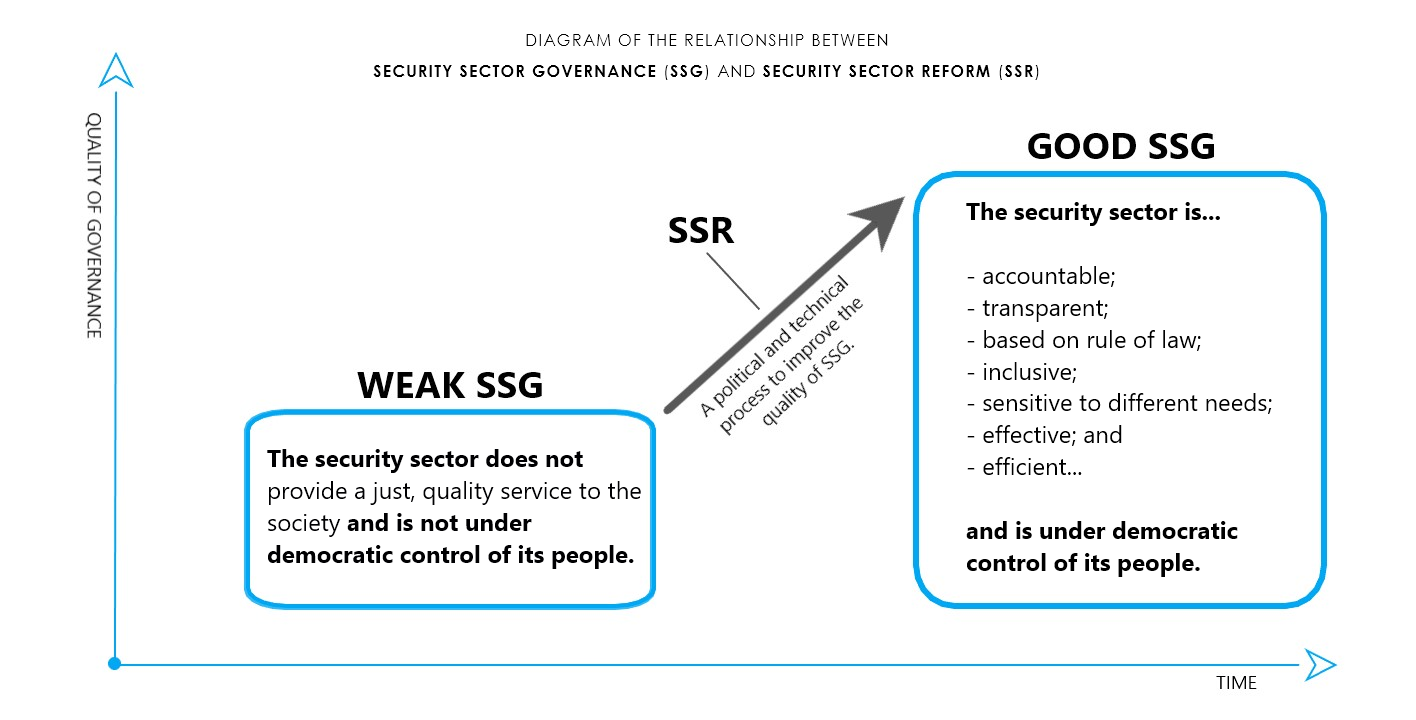
A diagram of the relationship between security sector reform and governance relative to time and quality

To observe and measure the quality of SSG as well as set more definite objectives, international development actors generally break down good security sector governance into different principles that are believed to showcase different subparts of a healthy security sector under democratic control. While exact configurations vary, some of the most common principles or objectives of good SSG that are commonly used include accountability, rule of law, and effectiveness. Political bias can show in the security sector.

A multitude of different practical situations of good SSG exist according to development actors: For example, in a security sector led by good governance, the use of force is defined by a legal framework. This subsequently requires, among others, that publicly transparent laws are in place; oversight and separation of powers mechanisms are established and working; and the state's legitimate use of force is regulated through strategies and policies. An operational level example would be improved and open interaction between the public and the security sector, including functioning freedom of information and complaint institutes.

SSR is aimed at the existence of both national security and human security. However, the goals of providing national and human security can be conflictual in the context of conflict-torn societies which lack the framework of democratic governance. According to Florian Weigand, the experiences of SSR in Afghanistan, for example, have prompted a debate on the advantages of providing human rather than state security in the process of state-building.

== Implementation ==
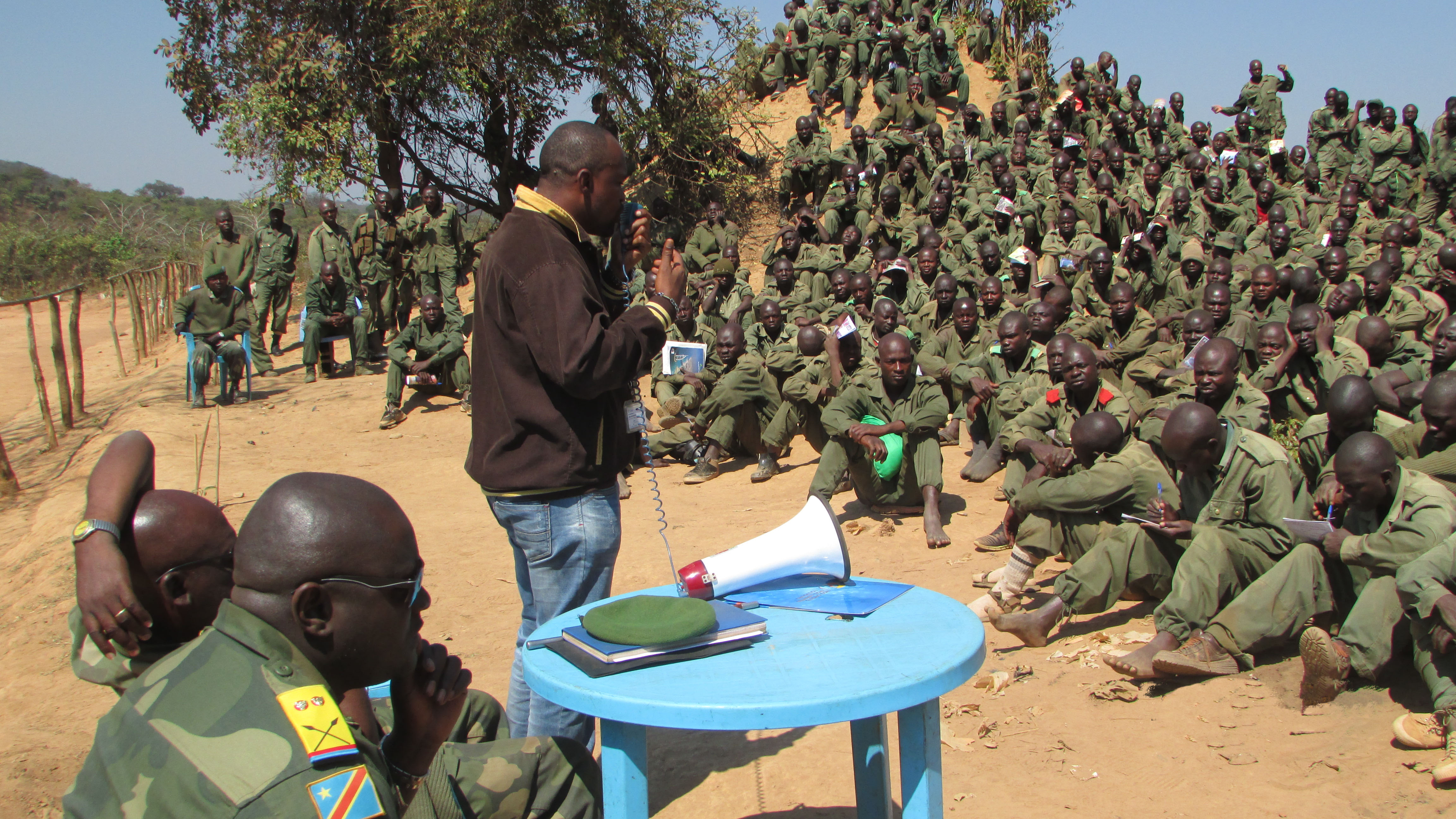
The UN peacekeeping operation in the Democratic Republic of the Congo (MONUSCO) providing security sector reform assistance

SSR is considered an instrument of international development aid; and attaining good SSG is seen by practitioners as a conflict prevention tool and as a post-conflict stabilizer. Examples of mechanisms that international actors reportedly use to perform security sector reform include disarmament, demobilization and reintegration (DDR) programmes to try and synchronize reforms to the security sector—and rule of law reforms as justice and security sectors are often considered intertwined. Likewise, SSR can be performed along transitional justice processes if the security sector has a legacy of violence against the population—and during security policy discussions to use SSR in supporting the implementation and reviews of the states' national security policy and strategy.

SSR is not understood by researchers to be limited to a single political situation, but rather can be introduced in various contexts. The circumstances under which reform efforts are undertaken are often classified as three different reform environments: post-conflict, transitional and developed countries. Nevertheless, security sector reform is most commonly introduced in post-conflict settings after war has ceased. However, its insensitive application to such contexts has raised criticism. For example, Jane Chanaa has argued that there is a concept–context divide because conceptualisation overshadowed the understanding on how the idea adapts to the local situations whereas Safal Ghimire has noted that such a chasm exists also because the 'SSR' concept does not talk about reforms in the benefactors.

== See also ==
- Gender and security sector reform
- Geneva Centre for the Democratic Control of Armed Forces (DCAF)
- International relations
- International security
- Peacebuilding
- Police accountability
- Public finance
- Surveillance abuse
