= Mine Action Coordination Center =

United Nations organization

A Mine Action Coordination Centre is an agency established in a region under the auspices of the United Nations to coordinate the clearing of the explosive remnants of war - including landmines and unexploded ordnance. The individual centres are commonly managed by the United Nations Office for Project Services (UNOPS) whereas global policy is in the remit of the United Nations Mine Action Service (UNMAS).

One of the major ones is UNMACC SL in Tyre, South Lebanon. Following the 2006 Lebanon War it coordinated clearance work involving the Lebanese Army, UNIFIL and civilian demining organisations. By 2009, around 190,000 unexploded cluster submunitinos had been located and destroyed. The number of cluster-munition clearance teams declined from 61 in 2007 to about 27 in 2009 as international attention and funding decreased.

Other centres exist in among other places like Khartoum, Sudan and Kabul, Afghanistan. Previous locations include Baghdad, Iraq and Pristina, Kosovo.
