= Geneva Call =

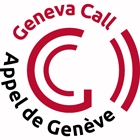
- Formation: March 2000
- Type: NGO
- Legal status: Non-profit making organization
- Headquarters: Geneva, Switzerland
- General Director: Alain Délétroz
- Staff: 250 staff (2022)
- Website: http://www.genevacall.org

Geneva Call is a non-governmental organization based in Geneva, Switzerland. It is currently focusing its efforts on banning the use of anti-personnel mines, protecting children from the effects of armed conflict, prohibiting sexual violence in armed conflict, working towards the elimination of gender discrimination and building armed non-State actors’ knowledge and implementation of broad International Humanitarian Law (IHL) rules.

Since 2015 it has been studying the protection of cultural heritage in conflicts involving armed non-state actors (ANSAs), which comprise the majority of current armed conflicts worldwide.

In 2018, Geneva Call started engaging ANSAs on the topics of displacement and medical care.

Since 2021, the NGO has broadened its scope and has started to engage ANSAs on the prevention of starvation and conflict-related food insecurity.

== Creation ==
Some members of the International Campaign to Ban Landmines were concerned that the Convention on the Prohibition of the Use, Stockpiling, Production and Transfer of Anti-Personnel Mines and on their Destruction, also known as the Ottawa Treaty, was only binding on states. Geneva Call was created in 1998, one year after the Ottawa Treaty was signed, to begin engaging armed non-State actors on the subject of landmines.

However, Geneva Call took little action until March 2000, at a conference organized by the Swiss Campaign to Ban Landmines called Engaging Non-State Actors in a Landmine Ban. This conference, the first of its kind, created a foundation for approaching armed non-State actors about a landmine ban, and served as the official launch of Geneva Call.

Geneva Call is a non-profit organization under Swiss law. It is headed by a board composed of local personalities with expertise in international law, in the thematic issues that compose Geneva Call's mission, in business or politics. The board is organizing an advisory council consisting of further experts in Geneva Call's work.

== Mission ==
Geneva Call engages with armed non-State actors to encourage them to comply with international humanitarian norms, improving the protection of civilians in armed conflict. These international humanitarian norms are enshrined in the Geneva Conventions and other international treaties. While initially focusing on the ban of anti-personnel mines, Geneva Call has expanded its work into additional areas that deserve specific attention, namely the protection of children in armed conflict – notably from recruitment and use in hostilities – as well as the prohibition of sexual violence and gender discrimination, the protection of cultural heritage, displacement and the protection of medical care in armed conflict. This expansion was envisioned in Geneva Call’s founding statutes and has also been encouraged by armed non-State actors themselves. Geneva Call has also increasingly provided IHL training to armed non-State actors, and advice on how to incorporate IHL rules into their codes of conduct and other internal regulations.

Geneva Call developed an innovative mechanism, the Deed of Commitment that allows armed non-State actors to pledge to respect specific humanitarian norms and be held publicly accountable for their commitments. They cannot become parties to relevant international treaties, and are generally precluded from participating in norm-making processes. Consequently, they may not feel bound to abide by rules that they have neither put forward nor formally adhered to. Sometimes they are simply not aware of their obligations under IHL.

The Deed of Commitment process gives them the opportunity to formally express their agreement to abide by humanitarian norms and take ownership of these rules.

To date, Geneva Call has developed five such documents:

- Deed of Commitment for Adherence to a Total Ban on Anti-Personnel Mines and for Cooperation in Mine Action, launched in 2000;
- Deed of Commitment for the Protection of Children from the Effects of Armed Conflict, launched in 2010;
- Deed of Commitment for the Prohibition of Sexual Violence in Situations of Armed Conflict and towards the Elimination of Gender Discrimination, launched in 2012;
- Deed of Commitment for the Protection of Health Care in Armed Conflict, launched in 2018;
- Deed of Commitment on the Prevention of Starvation and Address Conflict-Related Food Insecurity, launched in 2021.

Geneva Call’s mission is currently divided into eight thematic areas: banning anti-personnel mines, protecting children in armed conflict, prohibiting sexual violence and gender discrimination, protecting cultural heritage, displacement, protecting health care in armed conflict, preventing starvation and promoting the respect of humanitarian norms.

Since 2000, Geneva Call has engaged more than 100 armed non-State actors on eight thematic areas and to date 66 groups have signed one of the Deeds of Commitment.

=== Landmine ban ===
The struggle against anti-personnel mines was the original focus of Geneva Call. Geneva Call engages armed non-State actors to reduce the impact of anti-personnel mines on the civilian population by promoting the ban and encouraging cooperation in mine action.

In 2000, Geneva Call launched a first Deed of Commitment under Geneva Call for Adherence to a Total Ban on Anti-Personnel Mines and for Cooperation in Mine Action.

By signing the Deed of Commitment banning anti-personnel mines, armed non-State actors agree, inter alia, to:

- Prohibit under any circumstance the use, production, stockpiling, and transfer of anti-personnel mines;
- Undertake and cooperate in stockpile destruction; mine clearance; victim assistance; mine awareness; and various other forms of mine action, in cooperation with specialized organizations.

In November 2003, the Deed of Commitment banning anti-personnel mines mines was included in the UN Mine Action Guidelines for Ceasefire and Peace Agreements as a mechanism for armed non-State actor engagement. To this date, 54 ANSAs have signed this Deed of Commitment.

=== Child protection ===
Geneva Call has been involved with child soldiers as early as 2001, when it invited the Coalition to Stop the Use of Child Soldiers to a conference on engaging non-state actors to discuss their experiences in that field.

Geneva Call engages armed non-State actors to reduce the effects of armed conflict on children by promoting respect for children’s rights, in particular the prohibition of the recruitment and use of children in hostilities.

In November 2010, Geneva Call launched a second Deed of Commitment, the Deed of Commitment under Geneva Call for the Protection of Children from the Effects of Armed Conflict. To this date, 31 ANSAs have signed this Deed of Commitment.

By signing the Deed of Commitment protecting children in armed conflict, armed non-State actors agree, inter alia, to:

- Prohibit the use of children in hostilities;
- Ensure that children are not recruited into, or forcibly associated with, armed forces;
- Release or disassociate children in safety and security;
- Protect children from the effects of military operations;
- Do their best to provide children with the aid and care they need, in cooperation with specialized child protection agencies.

=== Gender issues ===
Geneva Call engages armed non-State actors to reduce conflict-related sexual violence, to eliminate gender discrimination and to promote greater participation of women in decision-making processes.

In June 2012, Geneva Call launched a third Deed of Commitment, the Deed of Commitment under Geneva Call for the Prohibition of Sexual Violence in Situations of Armed Conflict and towards the Elimination of Gender Discrimination''. To this date, 25 ANSAs have signed this Deed of Commitment. By signing the Deed of Commitment prohibiting sexual violence and gender discrimination, armed non-State actors agree, inter alia, to:

- Prohibit all forms of sexual violence;
- Prevent and sanction acts of sexual violence;
- Provide victims with access to the assistance and care they need;
- Ensure confidentiality and protection of victims of sexual violence;
- Eliminate discriminatory policies and practices against women or men;
- Ensure greater participation of women in decision-making processes.

=== Cultural heritage ===
Given the increasing number of deliberate attacks on cultural heritage (including on the part of ANSAs), in 2015, Geneva Call started engaging ANSAs on the protection of cultural heritage in situations of armed conflict. Geneva Call organizes activities addressing the cultural heritage aspect in different contexts, such as Mali, Syria, Iraq and Myanmar.

In 2018, Geneva Call published a report entitled “Culture under fire: armed non-State actors and cultural heritage in wartime”, which focuses on three case studies (Iraq, Mali and Syria) and recommends ways to enhance the protection of cultural heritage in armed conflict.

=== Displacement ===
In a context where each year, millions of people become internally displaced persons (IDPs) due to armed conflict, Geneva Call has organized events on this issue since 2011 and has started to formally engage ANSAs on displacement issues since 2018. For example, Geneva Call organizes training sessions on displacement with ANSAs. Those activities were undertaken in various countries, such as the DRC, Myanmar, Iraq and Syria.

=== Medical care ===
Since ANSAs are reportedly responsible for a third of all incidents of violence against health care facilities and personnel worldwide, Geneva Call decided to engage ANSAs on the protection of medical care in armed conflict since 2018. This same year, it launched a fourth Deed of Commitment on such topic. Up to date, 4 ANSAs have signed the Deed of Commitment.

=== Famine ===
Geneva Call claim that a “better respect for international humanitarian law can mitigate [the] causes of conflict-related food insecurity”. Building on several researches showing the effects of armed conflicts on food systems and livelihoods, the organization developed a new Deed of Commitment to prevent starvation and conflict-related food insecurity. This fifth DoC is called Deed of Commitment on the Prevention of Starvation and Addressing Conflict-Related Food Insecurity.

=== Actions areas ===
Geneva Call engages Armed non-State actors (ANSA) in several countries on a global scale.

==== Eurasia ====
- Burma / Myanmar
- Thailand
- Philippines
- Afghanistan
- Ukraine
- Pakistan

==== Middle East ====
- Iraq
- Lebanon
- Syria
- Yemen

==== Latin America ====
- Colombia

==== Africa ====
- DRC (Democratic Republic of Congo)
- Mali
- South Sudan
- Sudan
- Libya
- Burkina Faso

=== Humanitarian norms ===
In addition to engagement on specific norms (anti-personnel mines ban, protection of children from the effects of armed conflict, prohibition of sexual violence and gender discrimination, protection of cultural heritage, displacement and protection of health care), Geneva Call seeks to build armed non-State actors knowledge of broad IHL rules, and their capacities to implement them.

In recent years, Geneva Call has increasingly provided training sessions and technical advice to armed non-State actors on how to incorporate IHL into their policies, codes of conduct and other internal regulations and on implementation. In some cases, especially where Geneva Call’s current themes of engagement are not priority issues or best starting points for dialogue, activities around IHL can serve as a method for engagement.

== Impact ==
=== Success ===
From its inception in 2000, Geneva Call has engaged with more than 100 armed non-State actors worldwide and sensitized thousands of their leaders and members on international humanitarian norms. As of today, 54 armed non-State actors have signed the Deed of Commitment banning anti-personnel mines, 31 have signed the Deed of Commitment protecting children in armed conflict, 25 have signed the Deed of Commitment prohibiting sexual violence and gender discrimination, and 4 have signed the Deed of Commitment protecting health care in armed conflict.

Overall, their compliance record has been good. Except in one case, no conclusive evidence of violation of the Deeds of Commitment has been found to date. Signatories have taken implementing measures and cooperated in the monitoring of their compliance by Geneva Call. In addition, a number of armed non-State actors that have not signed the Deeds of Commitment have nevertheless taken steps towards compliance with international standards. For example, some have committed themselves to limiting mine, or facilitating mine action, and also to promoting respect and protection of healthcare facilities and humanitarian and health workers in areas under their control.

Praise

Ban Ki-moon, United Nations Secretary General from 2007 to 2016, has mentioned Geneva Call and its work on multiple occasions, including a speech where he identified the Geneva Call Deed of Commitment as a "successful example" of special commitments with non-state actors. The International Forum on Armed Groups and the Involvement of Children in Armed Conflict, held by the Coalition to Stop the Use of Child Soldiers in July 2006, recognized the Deed of Commitment as "one of the most innovative forms of persuading armed groups to make unilateral declarations to abide by IHL norms". In 2013, The Global Journal ranked Geneva Call 68th best NGO in the world and in 2017, NGO Advisor has rated Geneva Call as the 85th best NGO in the world in its 2017 edition of the ranking.

=== Criticism and Controversy ===
At the Seventh Meeting of States Parties to the Ottawa Treaty, Turkey accused Geneva Call of signing a Deed of Commitment with the Kurdistan Workers' Party without knowledge or consent from the Turkish government, describing the act as "inappropriate and unacceptable." Geneva Call claims that it informed Turkey of the engagement. Turkey refuses to allow Geneva Call into its borders to conduct verification missions with the Kurdistan Workers' Party.

The 2010 United States Supreme Court case Holder v. Humanitarian Law Project ruled that organizations providing international law training to organizations recognized as terrorist groups by the Department of State are committing a crime. Because of Geneva Call's work with the Kurdistan Workers' Party, some of the organization's activities could be considered illegal under American law. Geneva Call President at the time Élisabeth Decrey Warner responded that "civilians caught in the middle of conflicts and hoping for peace will suffer from this decision. How can you start peace talks or negotiations if you don't have the right to speak to both parties?"

Nevertheless, Geneva Call points out that its dialogue with ANSAs does not intend to legitimize them. In February 2022, Alain Délétroz, Geneva Call’s Director General, claimed that the organization adopts a "depoliticized talk" approach with ANSAs.

As a humanitarian principled organization, Geneva Call undertakes humanitarian dialogue with all armed non-state actors to the conflict regardless of their ideologies, to increase the compliance with IHL and IHRL to better protect civilians from the negative effect of the armed conflicts. This includes, for instance, the Alliance of Patriots for a Free and Sovereign Congo, present in North Kivu, the Ukrainian armed non-State actor Azov Special Operations Detachment, and the Moro Islamic Liberation Front, based in the Philippines.
