= United Nations Mine Action Service =

United Nations organization

- Abbreviation: UNMAS
- Formation: October 1997; 29 years ago
- Legal status: Active
- Headquarters: United Nations Headquarters; New York, USA
- Head: Director of UNMAS; Ms. Kazumi Ogawa
- Parent organization: United Nations Department of Peacekeeping Operations
- Website: www.unmas.org/en

The United Nations Mine Action Service (UNMAS) is a service located within the United Nations Department of Peacekeeping Operations that specializes in coordinating and implementing activities to limit the threat posed by mines, explosive remnants of war and improvised explosive devices.

The Service operates under United Nations legislative mandates of both the General Assembly and the Security Council, as well as by request of affected Member States, the United Nations Secretary-General or their designated official.

In 2015, the Secretary-General of the United Nations Ban Ki-moon designated actor Daniel Craig as the first United Nations Global Advocate for the Elimination of Mines and Explosive Hazards.

They last released their Annual Report in 2026, highlighting how UNMAS programmes made progress in the removal and destruction of tens of thousands of items of explosive ordnance, improved the safety of millions of people, strengthened the national capacity of multiple governments and reduced the threat and impact of explosive ordnance attacks carried out against United Nations peace operations.

== History ==
=== Origins ===
The United Nations had been involved in mine action since it established the Mine Action Programme for Afghanistan in 1989. Additionally, in the early 1990s the organization was conducting various mine action activities in Cambodia, Angola, Bosnia and Mozambique as part of its Peacekeeping Operations.

In 1992, Handicap International, Human Rights Watch, Medico International, Mines Advisory Group, Physicians for Human Rights, and the Vietnamese Veterans of America Foundation established the International Campaign to Ban Landmines. Through this initial push, by 1993, scores of national campaigns formed and hundreds of organizations joined the ICBL.

Following the success of ICBL, in 1994, member states of the United Nations took action. The Director of UNICEF Jim Grant, the Secretary-General of the United Nations Boutros Boutros-Ghali, called for the total ban on landmines and the Government of the Netherlands agreed to destroy its stockpile and support a total ban.

In 1995, the Government of Belgium passed a law banning landmines. Pope John Paul II called for an end to the production and use of landmines. In the same year, the International Committee of the Red Cross launched a global petition pushing for a land on landmines.

With pressure mounting, in 1997, 14 governments announced their support for a total ban on landmines. Canada hosted the Ottawa Treaty to build momentum for the cause. With the experience of Ottawa, the United Nations General Assembly drafted a resolution supporting the negotiation of a treaty to ban landmines, supported by 155 member states.

In 1997, the International Campaign to Ban Landmines had gathered the support of more than 1000 organizations across 60 countries. Moreover, a total of 122 nations had signed the Ottawa Treaty to ban landmines. Jody Williams, the founding coordinator of ICBL, received the Nobel Peace Price "for their work for the banning and clearing of anti-personnel mines".

=== United Nations Mine Action Service ===
UNMAS was not formally formed until 1997, when the Department of Peacekeeping Operation's Demining Unit and the Department of Humanitarian Affairs' Mine Clearance and Policy Unit were merged. It was created to act as the "UN focal point" regarding mine action and works to support the vision of a "world free of the threat of landmines and unexploded ordnance."

In 1998 the General Assembly welcomed the creation of the UNMAS Resolution 53/26, designating the Service as: "the focal point for mine action within the United Nations system, and its ongoing collaboration with and coordination of all mine-related activities of United Nations agencies, funds and programmes."

In 1999, the first UNMAS field programme was established in Kosovo. Mine accidents had been building as a result of returning Kosovians working in the fields. 70% of mine victims among returnees were under the age of 24.

In 2015, the Secretary-General of the United Nations António Guterres designated actor Daniel Craig as the first United Nations Global Advocate for the Elimination of Mines and Explosive Hazards.

In 2019, the Secretary-General of the United Nations António Guterres launched the five-year 'Safe Ground Campaign' (2019–2023), with the aim of raising awareness and resources for the victims and survivors of armed conflict through the promotion of sport and of the Sustainable Development Goals. Safe Ground establishes football fields out of mine-free areas. "Sport develops community, it brings people together, and Safe Ground aims to clear sport-oriented infrastructure, stadiums, sporting complexes, or spaces where sports can be played, so girls and boys, men and women, with or without a disability can play."

UNMAS launched its 'The United Nations Mine Action Strategy', identifying its mission with the Sustainable Development Goals in 2019: The United Nations Mine Action Strategy (Effective 1 January 2024)

As of 2026, UNMAS operates in 19 programmes internationally. These are: Abyei, Afghanistan, Central African Republic, Colombia, Cyprus, Democratic Republic of the Congo, Ethiopia, Iraq, Lebanon, Libya, Nigeria, State of Palestine, Somalia, South Sudan, Sudan, Syria, Western Sahara, Ukraine and Yemen.

== Five pillars of mine action ==
The work of UNMAS is divided into 5 Pillars of Mine Action:

1. Clearance
2. Mine Risk Education
3. Victim Assistance
4. Advocacy
5. Stockpile Destruction

=== Clearance ===
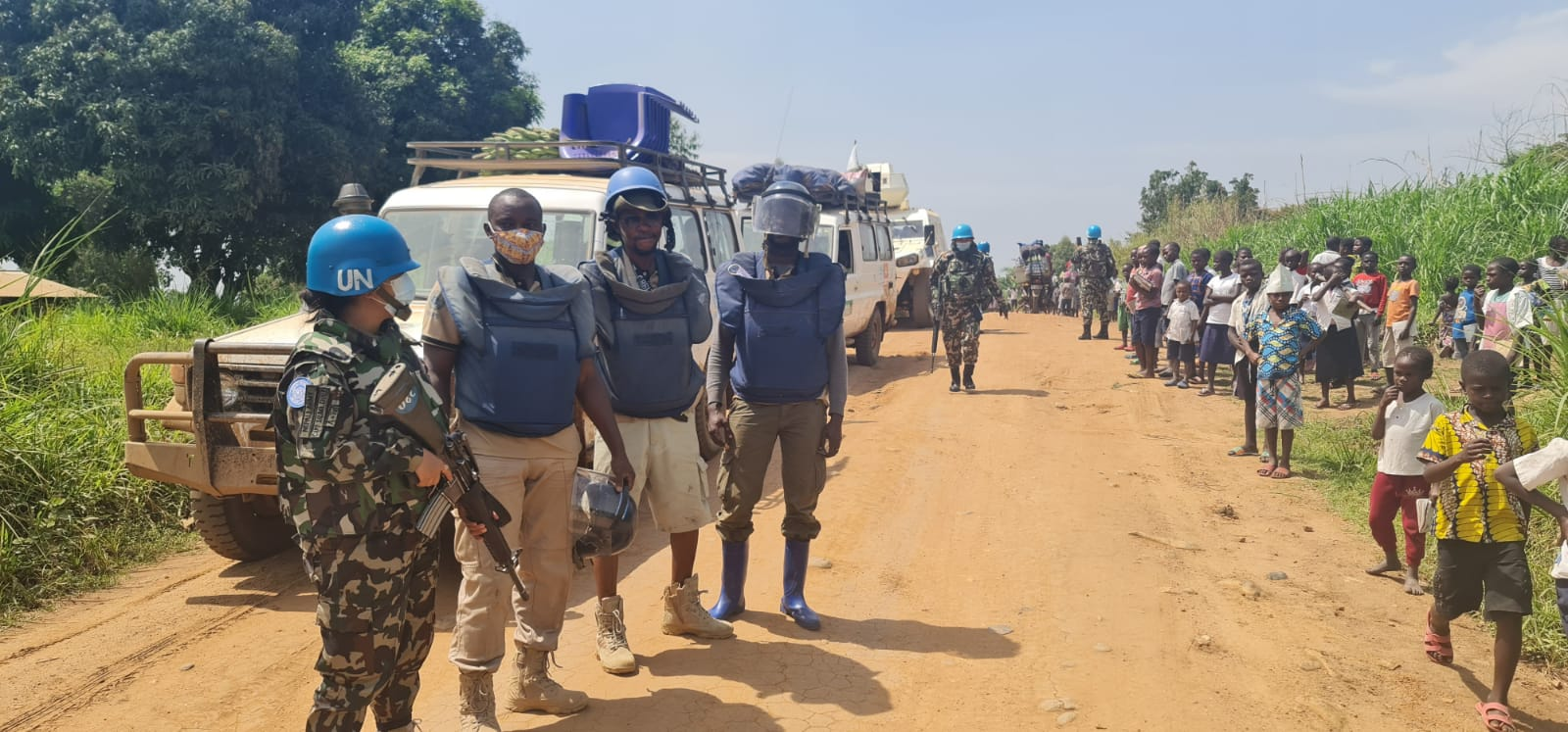
UNMAS (escorted by MONUSCO) working near Bunia in the DRC in 2022

In its broad sense, mine clearance includes surveys, mapping and minefield marking, as well as the actual clearance of mines from the ground. This range of activities is also sometimes referred to as demining.

Humanitarian mine clearance aims to clear land so that civilians can return to their homes and their everyday routines without the threat of landmines and unexploded remnants of war (ERW), which include unexploded ordnance and abandoned explosive ordnance. This means that all the mines and ERW affecting the places where ordinary people live must be cleared, and their safety in areas that have been cleared must be guaranteed. Mines are cleared and the areas are thoroughly verified so that they can say without a doubt that the land is now safe, and people can use it without worrying about the weapons. The aim of humanitarian demining is to restore peace and security at the community level.

Mine clearance methods:

- Surveying
  - Surveying, or the formal gathering of mine-related information, is required before actual clearance can begin. Impact surveys assess the socio-economic impact of the mine contamination and help assign priorities for the clearance of particular areas. Impact surveys make use of all available sources of information, including minefield records (where they exist), data about mine victims, and interviews with former combatants and local people. Technical surveys then define the minefields and provide detailed maps for the clearance operations.
- Maps
  - Maps resulting from the impact surveys and technical surveys are stored in an information management system, including a variety of programme databases, and provide baseline data for clearance organizations and operational planning.
- Minefield marking
  - Minefield marking is carried out when a mined area is identified, but clearance operations cannot take place immediately. Minefield marking, which is intended to deter people from entering mined areas, has to be carried out in combination with mine awareness, so that the local population understands the meaning and importance of the signs.
- Manual clearance
  - Manual clearance relies on trained deminers using metal detectors and long thin prodders to locate the mines, which are then destroyed by controlled explosion.
- Mine detection dogs
  - Mine detection dogs, which detect the presence of explosives in the ground by smell. Dogs are used in combination with manual deminers.
- Mechanical clearance
  - Mechanical clearance relies on flails, rollers, vegetation cutters and excavators, often attached to armoured bulldozers, to destroy the mines in the ground. These machines can only be used in certain terrains, and are expensive to operate. In most situations they are also not 100% reliable, and the work needs to be checked by other techniques.

=== Mine Risk Education (MRE) ===
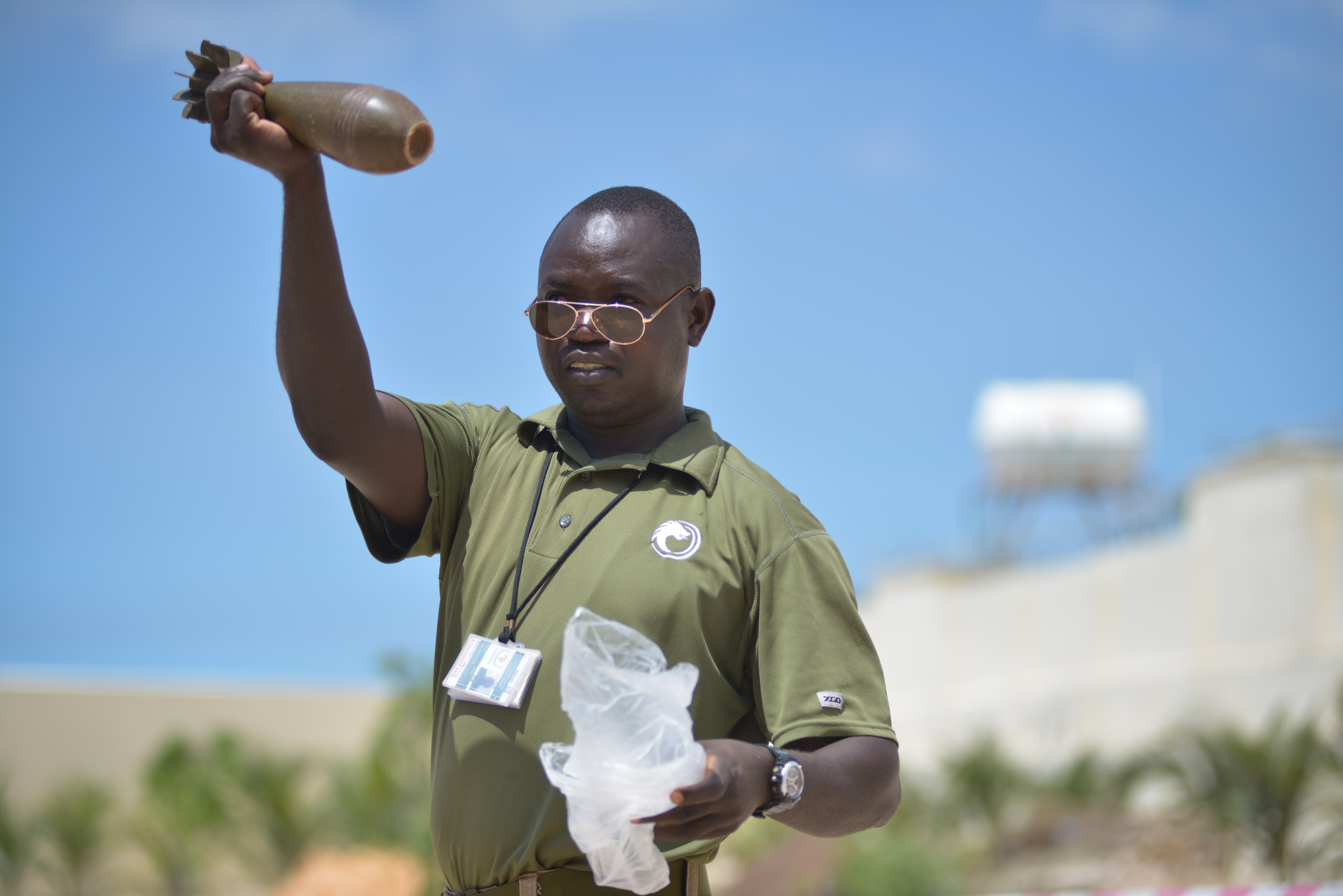
A bomb disposal technician holds up a mortar shell during a demonstration held by the UNMAS in Mogadishu, Somalia.

Risk education, or RE, refers to educational activities aimed at reducing the risk of injury from mines and unexploded ordnance by raising awareness and promoting behavioural change through public-information campaigns, education and training, and liaison with communities.

RE ensures that communities are aware of the risks from mines, unexploded ordnance and/or abandoned munitions and are encouraged to behave in ways that reduce the risk to people, property and the environment. Objectives are to reduce the risk to a level where people can live safely and to recreate an environment where economic and social development can occur free from the constraints imposed by landmine contamination.

RE, along with demining (which includes technical surveys, mapping, clearance of unexploded ordnance and mines, marking unsafe areas, and documenting areas that have been cleared), contributes to mine-risk reduction, or limiting the risk of physical injury from mines and unexploded ordnance that already contaminates the land. Advocacy and the destruction of landmine stockpiles focus on preventing future use of mines.

"Education and training" in MRE encompasses all educational and training activities that reduce the risk of injury from mines, unexploded ordnance and/or abandoned munitions by raising awareness of the threat to individuals and communities and promoting behavioural change. Education and training is a two-way process, which involves the imparting and acquiring of knowledge, changing attitudes and practices through teaching and learning.

Education and training activities may be conducted in formal and non-formal environments: teacher-to-child education in schools, information shared at home from parents to children or from children to their parents, child-to-child education, peer-to-peer education in work and recreational environments, landmine safety training for humanitarian aid workers and the incorporation of landmine safety messages in occupational health and safety practices.

=== Victim Assistance ===
Building on the experience gained in this area since the entry into force of the Antipersonnel Mine Ban Treaty the negotiators of the Convention on Cluster Munitions agreed on a specific article on victim assistance (Article 5), which contains a number of obligations for States Parties with respect to cluster munition victims in areas under its jurisdiction and control. The Convention on Cluster Munitions also provides the following definition of cluster munition victims: " (...) all persons who have been killed or suffered physical or psychological injury, economic loss, social marginalisation or substantial impairment of the realisation of their rights caused by the use of cluster munitions. They include those persons directly impacted by cluster munitions as well as their affected families and communities."

Hundreds of thousands of mine and explosive remnants of war survivors exist in 78 countries. According to the 2008 Landmine Monitor Report, there are up to 60,000 survivors in Afghanistan alone and over 45,000 in Cambodia. In 2011, the Landmine Monitor identified 4,286 new injuries around the world by mines, explosive remnants of war and victim-detonated improvised explosive devices. While the actual figure is unknown, it may well be far greater, since many incidents of mine and explosive ordnance accidents are never reported and are therefore not registered.

Within the UN system, the United Nation Mine Action Service works closely with the World Health Organization (WHO) and other UN entities, in particular UNICEF, that also support victim assistance activities. They all work closely with partner organisations outside the United Nations system, such as the International Committee of the Red Cross, Survivor Corps, World Rehabilitation Fund, Handicap International Belgium and Vietnam Veterans of America Foundation.

=== Advocacy ===
UNMAS coordinates overall UN advocacy in support of treaties and other international legal instruments related to landmines and explosive remnants of war, including cluster munitions, and in support of the rights of people affected by these devices.

Methods:

- Public information dissemination
  - "Public information" in the context of mine action describes landmine and unexploded ordnance situations and informs and updates a broad range of stakeholders. Such information may focus on local risk-reduction messages, address broader national issues such as complying with legislation or raise public support for mine-action programmes.
  - Public information "dissemination," however, refers primarily to public-information activities that help reduce the risk of injury from mines and unexploded ordnance by raising awareness of the risk to individuals and communities, and by promoting behavioural change. It is primarily a one-way form of communication transmitted through mass media. Public information-dissemination initiatives may be stand-alone MRE projects that are implemented in advance of other mine-action activities.
- Community liaison
  - Community liaison refers to the systems and processes used to exchange information between national authorities, mine-action organisations and communities on the presence of mines, unexploded ordnance and abandoned munitions. It enables communities to be informed about planned demining activities, the nature and duration of the tasks, and the exact locations of marked or cleared areas. Furthermore, it enables communities to inform local authorities and mine-action organizations about the location, extent and impact of contaminated areas. This information can greatly assist the planning of related activities, such as technical surveys, marking and clearance operations, and survivor-assistance services. Community liaison ensures that mine-action projects address community needs and priorities. Community liaison should be carried out by all organizations conducting mine-action operations.

Community liaison services may begin far in advance of demining activities and help the development of local capacities to assess the risks, manage information and develop risk-reduction strategies.

=== Stockpile destruction ===
Stockpiled anti-personnel landmines (APM) far outnumber those actually laid in the ground. In accordance with Article 4 of the anti-personnel mine-ban treaty, State Parties must destroy their stockpiled mines within four years after their accession to the convention. Sixty-five countries have now destroyed their stockpiles of antipersonnel landmines, destroying a combined total of more than 37 million mines. Another 51 countries have officially declared not having a stockpile of antipersonnel mines and a further three countries are scheduled to destroy their stockpiles by the end of the year.

There are many options available to states in destroying their stockpiles. Stockpiles are usually destroyed by the military, but an industrial solution can also be employed. The techniques used vary depending on the make-up of the mines and the conditions in which they are found. The complete destruction cycle involves aspects such as transportation and storage, processing operations, equipment maintenance, staff training and accounting, as well as the actual physical destruction.

== Inter-Agency Coordination Group on Mine Action ==
The Inter-Agency Coordination Group on Mine Action (IACG-MA) is a coalition of 12 United Nations offices, specialized agencies, funds and programmes that work to divide of labor within the United Nations regarding mine action. In order to achieve this, they created the Mine Action and Effective Coordination: the United Nations Inter-Agency Policy to effectively tackle the United Nations' mine action response.

Members

- The Department of Peacekeeping Operations/United Nations Mine Action Service (DPKO /UNMAS) (chair)
- The Office for Disarmament Affairs (ODA)
- The United Nations Development Programme (UNDP)
- The United Nations Office for the Coordination of Humanitarian Affairs (OCHA)
- The Office of the United Nations High Commissioner for Human Rights (OHCHR)
- The Office of the United Nations High Commissioner for Refugees (UNHCR)
- The United Nations Children's Fund (UNICEF)
- The United Nations Entity for Gender Equality and the Empowerment of Women (UN-Women)
- The United Nations Office for Project Services (UNOPS)
- The Food and Agriculture Organization of the United Nations (FAO)
- The World Food Programme (WFP)
- The World Health Organization (WHO)

Observers

- The United Nations Institute for Disarmament Research (UNIDIR)
- The World Bank

== Milestones ==
On 14 June 2011, the United Nations had declared Nepal to be landmine free.

On 14 May 2015, the UN Secretary-General Ban Ki-moon designated Daniel Craig as the UN Global Advocate for the elimination of mines and explosive hazards.

2017 marked the 20th anniversary of UNMAS.

In 2026, UNMAS presented the online exhibition 'Signs of Safety', one of many digital exhibits available on their website.
