= Mine action =

Removal of land mines

Mine action is a combination of humanitarian aid and development studies that aims to remove landmines and reduce the social, economic and environmental impact of them and the explosive remnants of war (ERW). The International Mine Action Standards (IMAS) are standards issued by the United Nations to guide the planning, implementation and management of mine action programmes.

== Description ==
Ottawa Treaty members: Signed and ratified Acceded or succeeded

Mine action is commonly represented as comprising five complementary groups of activities:

- Humanitarian demining, i.e. mine and ERW survey, land release, mapping, marking and clearance
- Risk education (RE), i.e. the communication to the public of the risk of ERW and how to act in the presence of ERW
- Victim assistance, including rehabilitation and reintegration
- Stockpile destruction
- Advocacy to promote policies and practices that will reduce the threat from landmines and ERW, usually in the context of disarmament and international humanitarian law. The most commonly applied treaties including the 1997 anti-personnel Mine Ban Treaty (Ottawa Treaty), the Convention on Cluster Munitions, and the Convention on Certain Conventional Weapons.

The objective of these activities is to provide a safe environment in which landmines and ERW do not impede economical, social and health development, and to address the needs of victims. Gender mainstreaming will ensure that the different needs of women, girls, boys and men are taken into account and inequality is not perpetuated.

The coordination of mine action activities in affected countries is commonly conducted by Mine Action Coordination Centers (MACC) managed either by the United Nations or the host country government.

== Clearance ==
In its broad sense, mine clearance includes surveying, mapping and marking of minefields and removal of mines from the ground. This range of activities is also sometimes referred to as demining.

Humanitarian mine clearance aims to clear land so that civilians can return to their homes and their everyday routines without the threat of landmines and unexploded remnants of war (ERW), which include unexploaded ordnance and abandoned explosive ordnance. This means that all the mines and ERW affecting the places where ordinary people live must be cleared, and their safety in areas that have been cleared must be guaranteed. Mines are cleared and the areas are thoroughly verified so that they can say without a doubt that the land is now safe, and people can use it without worrying about the weapons. The aim of humanitarian demining is to restore peace and security at the community level.

=== Methods ===
==== Surveying ====
Non-technical surveying, or the formal gathering of mine-related information, is required before actual clearance can begin. Impact surveys assess the socio-economic impact of the mine contamination and help assign priorities for the clearance of particular areas. Impact surveys make use of all available sources of information, including minefield records (where they exist), data about mine victims, and interviews with former combatants and local people. Technical surveys then define the minefields and provide detailed maps for the clearance operations.

==== Maps ====
Maps resulting from the impact surveys and technical surveys are stored in an information management system, including a variety of programme databases, and provide baseline data for clearance organisations and operational planning.

==== Minefield marking ====
Minefield marking is carried out when a mined area is identified, but clearance operations cannot take place immediately. Minefield marking, which is intended to deter people from entering mined areas, has to be carried out in combination with mine awareness, so that the local population understands the meaning and importance of the signs.

==== Manual clearance ====
Manual clearance relies on trained deminers using metal detectors and long thin prodders to locate the mines, which are then destroyed by controlled explosion.

==== Animals in mine detection ====
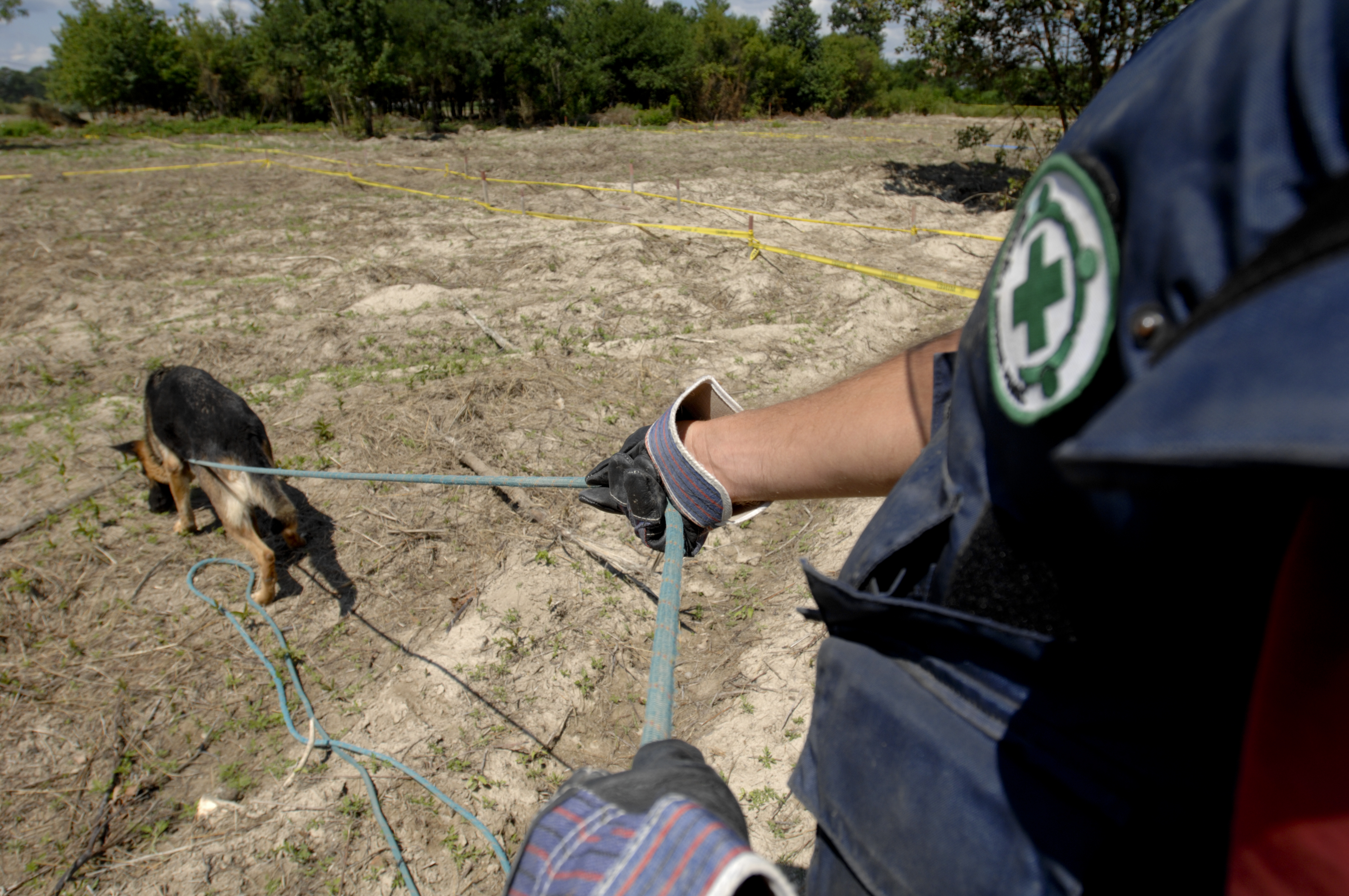
A dog searching for mines in Bosnia and Herzegovina

Mine detection dogs, which detect the presence of explosives in the ground by smell. Dogs are used in combination with manual deminers. As well as dogs, rats detect the presence of explosive in the ground by smell. Rats are used in combination with manual deminers or mechanical demining.

==== Mechanical clearance ====
Mechanical clearance relies on flails, rollers, vegetation cutters, and excavators, often attached to armoured bulldozers, to destroy the mines in the ground. These machines can only be used in certain terrains, and are expensive to operate. In most situations they are also not 100% reliable, and the work needs to be checked by other techniques.

== Mine-risk education (MRE) ==
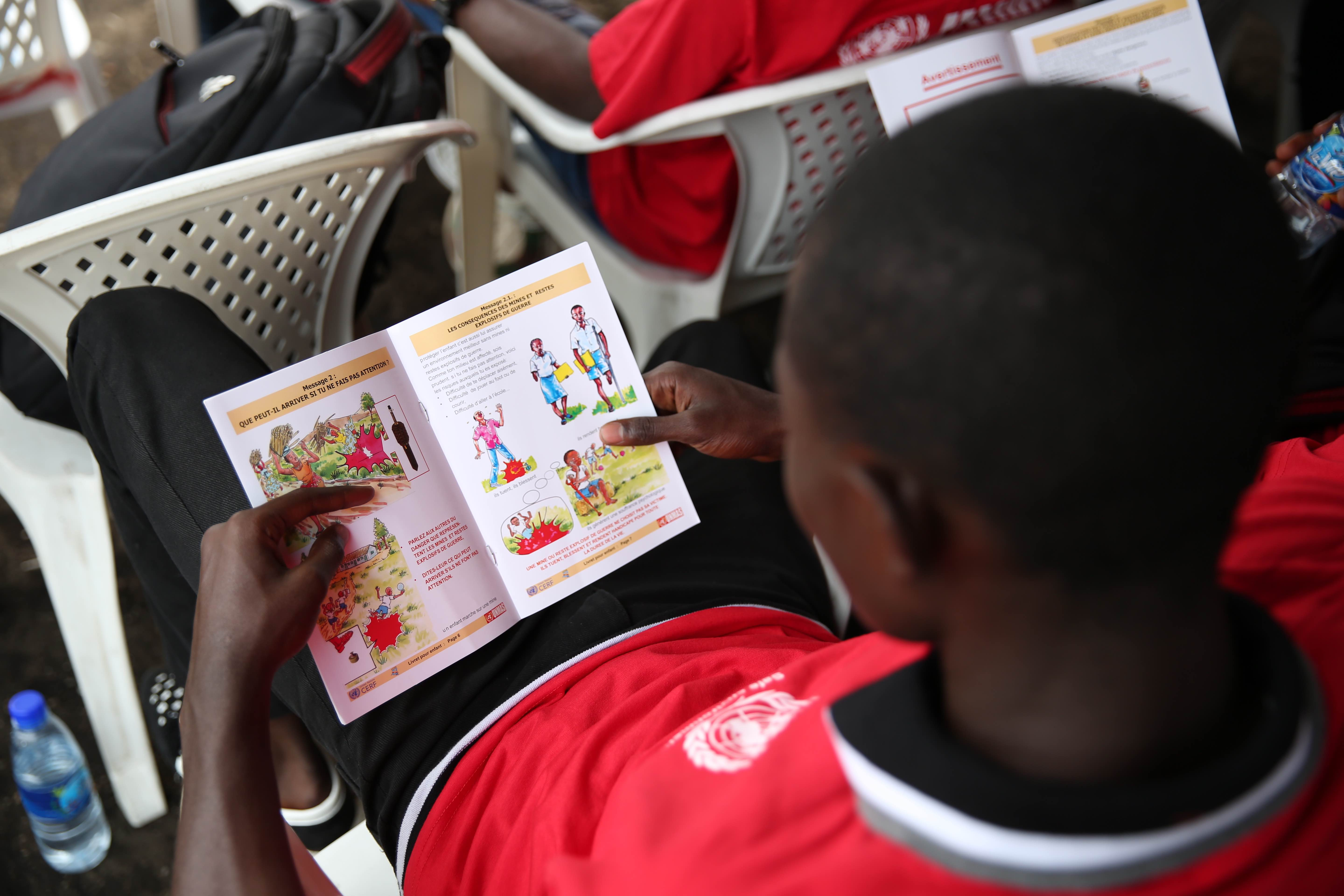
Participant reading a risk education leaflet during a UNMAS event in Goma, North Kivu, Democratic Republic of the Congo

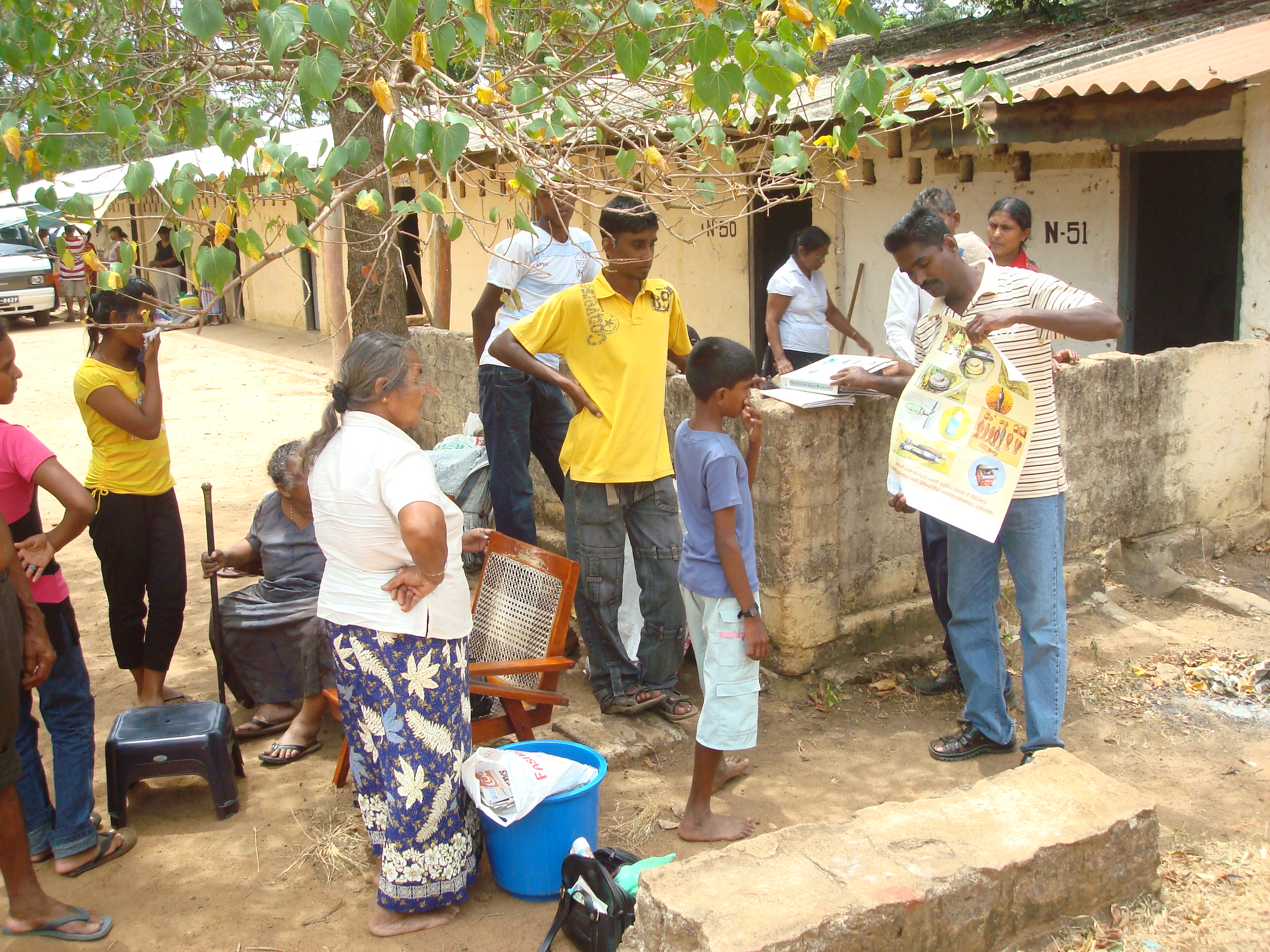
Emergency mine risk education for pilgrims during a 2010 Roman Catholic festival in Madhu, Sri Lanka

Mine-risk education (MRE), now more commonly referred to in international standards as explosive ordnance risk education (EORE), refers to efforts to raise awareness and promote behavioural change through public-information campaigns, education and training, and liaison with communities.

MRE ensures that communities are aware of the risks from mines, unexploded ordnance and/or abandoned munitions and are encouraged to behave in ways that reduce the risk to people, property and the environment. Objectives are to reduce the risk to humans and to restore an environment where economic and social development can occur free from the constraints imposed by landmine contamination.

According to the Landmine Monitor Report (2009), in 2008, MRE was provided in 57 states and areas, compared to 61 states and areas in 2007. However, in the 1999 MRE programs were identified in just 14 states. MRE activities increased significantly in Yemen and Somaliland, and also increased to some degree in 10 other states. In Palestine, RE decreased in 2008 but rose sharply in response to conflict in Gaza in December 2008–January 2009. Some of the main players in MRE include Catholic Relief Services, German Caritas international, the Mines Advisory Group, Handicap International, Save the Children, INTERSOS, DanChurchAid, Norwegian People's Aid, the Mines Awareness Trust, Association for Aid and Relief, Japan and the International Committee of the Red Cross. Within the UN system UNICEF is the lead agency for MRE and supports programmes in 30 countries.

International standards have been developed to guide the management of MRE programmes. These standards emphasize that MRE should typically not be a stand-alone activity; it is an integral part of overall mine-action planning and implementation.

=== Public information dissemination ===
"Public information" in the context of mine action describes landmine and unexploded ordnance situations and informs and updates a broad range of stakeholders. Such information may focus on local risk-reduction messages, address broader national issues such as complying with legislation or raise public support for mine-action programmes.

Public information "dissemination", however, is primarily a one-way form of communication transmitted through mass media. Initiatives may be stand-alone MRE projects that are implemented in advance of other mine-action activities.

=== Education and training ===
"Education and training" is a two-way process that involves the imparting and acquiring of knowledge and the changing of attitudes and practices through teaching and learning.

Education and training activities may be conducted in formal and non-formal environments: teacher-to-child education in schools, information shared at home from parents to children or from children to their parents, child-to-child education, peer-to-peer education in work and recreational environments, landmine safety training for humanitarian aid workers and the incorporation of landmine safety messages in occupational health and safety practices.

=== Community liaison ===
Community liaison refers to the systems and processes used to exchange information between national authorities, mine-action organisations and communities on the presence of mines, unexploded ordnance and abandoned munitions. It enables communities to be informed about planned demining activities, the nature and duration of the tasks, and the exact locations of marked or cleared areas. Furthermore, it enables communities to inform local authorities and mine-action organizations about the location, extent and impact of contaminated areas. This information can greatly assist the planning of related activities, such as technical surveys, marking and clearance operations, and survivor-assistance services. Community liaison ensures that mine-action projects address community needs and priorities. Community liaison should be carried out by all organizations conducting mine-action operations.

Community liaison services may begin far in advance of demining activities and help the development of local capacities to assess the risks, manage information and develop risk-reduction strategies.

== Stockpile destruction ==
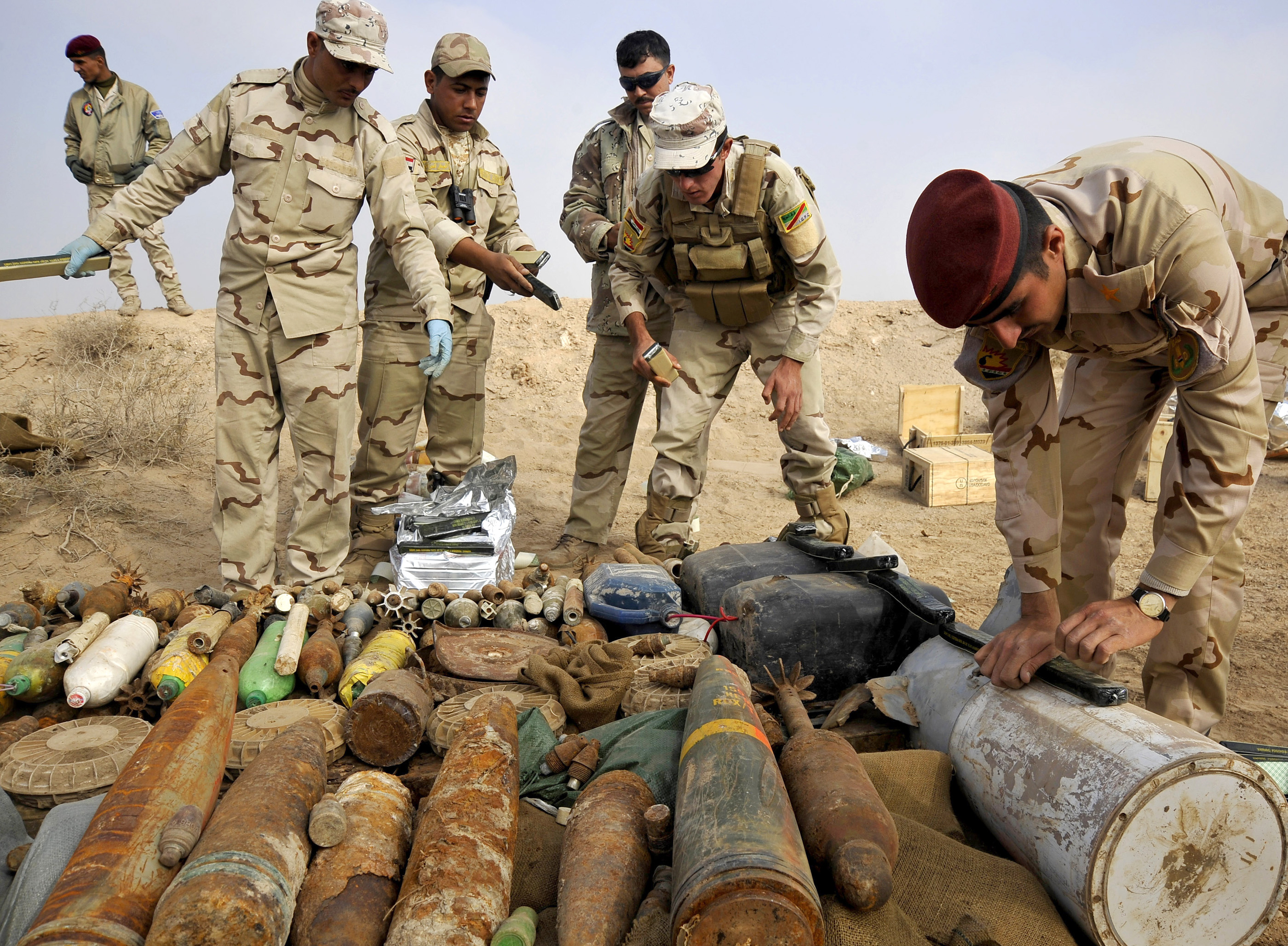
Iraqi army soldiers prepare for a controlled detonation of ordnance (November 23, 2009, at Mahmudiyah)

Stockpiled anti-personnel landmines (APM) far outnumber those actually laid in the ground. In accordance with Article 4 of the anti-personnel mine-ban treaty, State Parties that accede to the treaty must destroy their stockpiled mines within four years. Sixty-five countries have now destroyed their stockpiles of antipersonnel landmines, destroying a combined total of more than 37 million mines. Another 51 countries have officially declared that they do not have a stockpile and a further three countries are scheduled to destroy theirs by the end of the year.

There are many options available to states in destroying their stockpiles. Stockpiles are usually destroyed by the military, but an industrial solution can also be employed. The techniques used vary depending on the make-up of the mines and the conditions in which they are found.

=== Laser cutting ===
Still in the research phase in the USA.

=== Microwave melt-out ===
This technology is also under development in the USA. It utilises microwaves to heat up TNT based explosive fillings. It is a rapid, clean technique but has one major disadvantage, the lack of control over heating can lead to the formation of "hot spots" with a resultant initiation of the filling. Work continues on its development, but it is not yet a feasible production technique. It is more energy efficient that steam and improves the value of any recovered explosives.

=== Destruction technology ===
==== "Silver II" ====
An electro-chemical oxidation process. The organic waste is treated by the generation of highly oxidising species in an electro-chemical cell. The cell is separated into two compartments by a membrane that allows ion flow but prevents bulk mixing of the anolyte and catholyte. In the anolyte compartment a highly reactive species of silver ion attacks organic material ultimately converting it to CO_{2}, H_{2}O and non-toxic inorganic compounds.

==== Biological degradation ====
This technology has been demonstrated at the pilot level for the destruction of perchlorate contaminated aqueous streams. The potential exists for bacteria to be used to consume the explosive content of APM, converting it into inert material. It requires extensive storage capacity whilst bio-remediation is taking place and only has limited applications. There is also a requirement for an element of mechanical breakdown prior to the addition of the bacteria.

==== Molten salt oxidation ====
Only demonstrated at a prototype scale. This method can destroy finely divided and consistent organic waste, so significant pre-processing is required beforehand. Since these wastes can be destroyed by incineration at a much quicker rate, this technical solution is considered too expensive and impracticable at the moment.

== Mine victim assistance ==
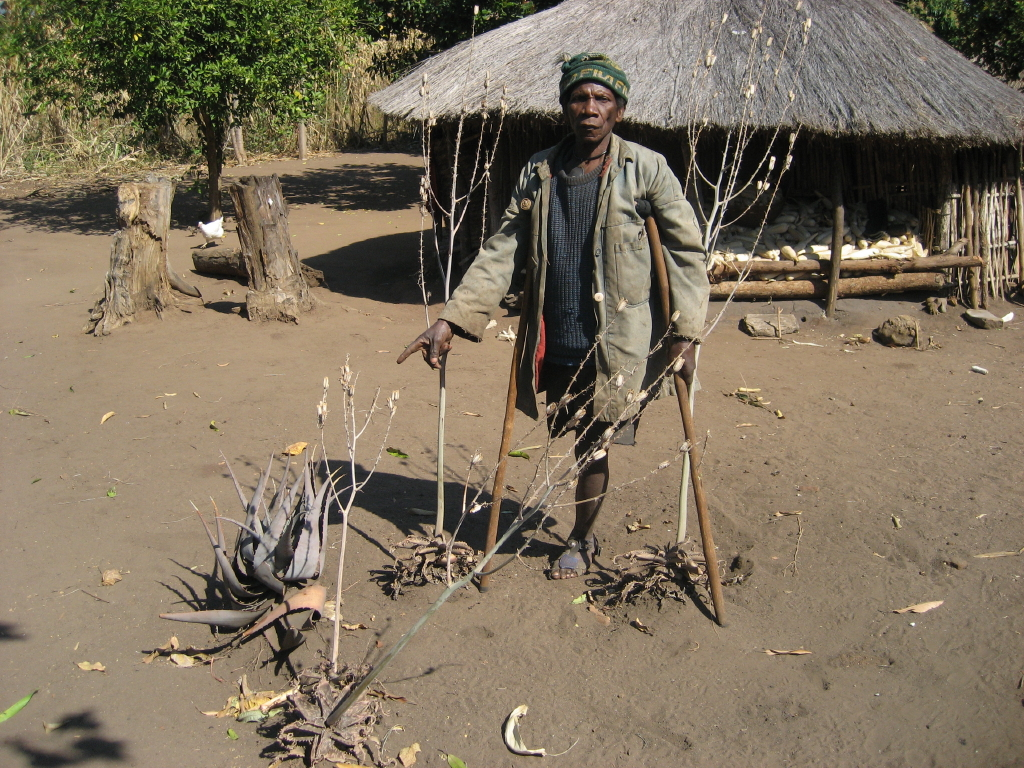
Land mine victim in Mozambique

Mine victim assistance is a humanitarian effort which aims to organize a collaborative support for injured victims from mine and ERW as well as their families, thus enabling them to live normal lives. The approaches include physical rehabilitation, psychological support, and recovery of the victimized family and community. The work involves different level of actors, various organizations and State Parties who are obliged to perform the task under the Article 6 of the Mine Ban Treaty and Article 5 of the Convention on Cluster Munitions. United Nations Mine Action Service (UNMAS) is another active participant cooperating with other actors under United Nations, recently presenting the six-year plan according to mine action, "The Strategy of the United Nations on Mine Action 2013-2018".

== See also ==
- Geneva International Centre for Humanitarian Demining
- International Campaign to Ban Landmines
- Mine clearance agencies
- Mines Advisory Group
- Swiss Foundation for Mine Action (FSD)
