= Diana, Princess of Wales Memorial Fund =

Defunct grant-giving organisation

- Formation: September 1997
- Dissolved: December 2012
- Location(s): Kensington Palace; Palace Green; London, England W8 4PU
- Region served: United Kingdom and overseas

The Diana, Princess of Wales Memorial Fund was an independent grant-giving foundation established in September 1997 after the death of Diana, Princess of Wales, to continue her humanitarian work in the United Kingdom and overseas. It was a registered charity under English law. The Fund closed at the end of 2012.

== Establishment and funding ==
The Diana, Princess of Wales Memorial Fund ('the Fund') was established within days of the death of Diana, Princess of Wales, on 31 August 1997, in response to the donations that poured into Kensington Palace. The general public, community groups and companies donated £34 million. £38 million was donated from sales of Elton John and PolyGram's CD of "Candle in the Wind 1997". A further £66 million were subsequently raised through investments, an eight-year programme of commercial partnerships, and proceeds from the exhibition, Diana: A Celebration, donated by Lord Spencer.

== Mission and activities ==
During its fifteen years of operation, the Fund worked to secure sustainable improvements in the lives of the most disadvantaged people in the UK and around the world by giving grants, championing causes and lending the Fund's name and profile to charitable causes.

For its first ten years, 1997–2006, the Fund was largely a criteria-led grantmaker. Grant programmes were devised and developed on an annual basis and were open to any eligible organisation that wished to apply. During this period, the Fund spent over £60 million on helping improve the lives of displaced people, people at the margins of society, survivors of conflict and those who were dying or bereaved.

In 2006, following a consultation with the voluntary sector and a period of strategic review, the Fund decided that it would be most effective if its remaining capital was focused on a time-limited, targeted programme of work. The decision to cease operating within five-to-nine years was announced in 2007 at the launch of a new five-year Strategic Plan. The Strategic Plan set out a number of proactive grantmaking programmes, called Initiatives, which were:

- The Palliative Care Initiative.
- The Refugee and Asylum Seekers Initiative.
- The Partnership Initiative, which in 2009, became two separate Initiatives: The Cluster Munitions Initiative and The Penal Reform Initiative.

Each Initiative set out to create sustainable change in their areas of focus by securing positive improvements in policy, practice and public attitudes. This systems-change approach was adopted both to establish a momentum for long-term social change and to ensure that any positive improvements secured would last for far longer that the Fund's lifetime and continue to help future generations to come.

== The Palliative Care Initiative ==
The Fund set up its Palliative Care Initiative in 2000 to work in seven countries in sub-Saharan Africa – Kenya, Malawi, South Africa, Tanzania, Uganda, Zambia and Zimbabwe. By 2006, the Fund had awarded 60 grants totaling over £2.5 million to organisations working in palliative care in sub-Saharan Africa. In 2007, as part of the Fund's 2007–2012 Strategic Plan, the Palliative Care Initiative committed to spend up to a further £10 million by 2012. The Palliative Care Initiative focused on:

- Helping to integrate palliative care into health policies.
- Working to ensure that palliative care was included as part of medical and nursing courses.
- Supporting organisations who were able to make more children's palliative care services available.

== The Refugee and Asylum Seekers Initiative ==
Between 1999 and 2007, the Fund awarded over £6 million in grants to approximately 40 organisations for projects supporting young refugees and children and young people seeking asylum. The Fund pledged a further £10 million under its Strategic Plan 2007–2012 to support work aimed at ensuring that refugees and people seeking asylum in the UK are treated fairly, humanely and in accordance with international law. The Refugee and Asylum Seekers Initiative focused on:

- Supporting advocacy and campaigning activities aimed at improving the lives of all those arriving in the UK to seek protection from persecution.
- Initiating a collaboration of foundations working to ensure a more balanced public debate on migration and asylum issues.
- Supporting organisations working with refugee children and young people seeking asylum to help ensure adequate care and protection.
- Funding work to develop and increase specialised legal representation for children and young people seeking asylum.

The initiative attracted criticism from a number of individuals, including Sir Andrew Green, chairman of MigrationWatch UK, and Norman Tebbit.

== The Cluster Munitions Initiative ==
In 2007, the Fund established the Cluster Munitions Initiative, which was initially the international arm of the Partnership Initiative, in order to build upon its previous support for the campaign against cluster munitions. The Cluster Munitions Initiative focused its resources on three areas of work:

- Supporting the global campaign to ban cluster bombs.
- Supporting national campaigns to ban cluster bombs.
- Supporting the Ban Advocates Initiative – a group of ordinary civilians, all affected by cluster bombs, who came together from around the world to campaign for a worldwide ban.

== The Penal Reform Initiative ==
The Penal Reform Initiative was established under the Fund's 2007–2012 Strategic Plan in order to encourage the use of alternative solutions to imprisonment for two of the most vulnerable groups in custody – women and children and young people.

In 2007, the Fund gave a grant of over £1.5 million to the Prison Reform Trust to run Out of Trouble, a major five-year campaign to reduce the number of children and young people in custody.

Between 1997 and 2007, the women's prison population more than doubled, and, as with children and young people, the vast majority were there for non-violent offences. In 2008, the Fund became a member of the Corston Independent Funders' Coalition (CIFC), a coalition of trusts, foundations and philanthropists set up to transform how disadvantaged women were treated by the criminal justice system.

== Closure ==
In 2006, following a consultation with the voluntary sector and a period of strategic review, the Fund decided that it would be most effective if its remaining capital was focused on a time-limited, targeted programme of work aimed at creating sustainable improvements to the lives of disadvantaged people. The decision to close within five to nine years was announced in 2007 at the launch of a new five-year programme of work under its Strategic Plan 2007–2012.

On 31 December 2012, the Fund closed as a staffed, operational organisation, having successfully completed its programme of work aimed at improving the lives of the most disadvantaged people in the UK and around the world.

As an unincorporated trust, the Fund, as a matter of law, could not altogether cease to exist when it closed its doors on 31 December 2012. This meant that the Fund would automatically continue to receive future donations. The Directors of the Fund's Trustee Company were keen to ensure that if any money was donated to the Fund after its operations had ceased they would not be lost to charity and instead would continue to make a positive difference to people's lives.

In March 2013, The Royal Foundation became the legal owner of the Fund in order to safeguard the Fund's name and any further income donated to the Fund in the future.

In July 2020, it was reported that the money from the memorial fund was divided between Princes William and Harry and given to their independent charities.

== Legal issues with Franklin Mint ==
In 1998, the Fund refused Franklin Mint a licence to produce Diana memorabilia, but the Mint went ahead and produced Diana merchandise anyway. The Fund sued in 2002 and lost the case because in the California courts right of publicity may only be filed on behalf of a dead person who is a Californian. Upon losing the case, the Fund was required to pay the Franklin Mint's legal costs of £3 million which, combined with other fees, caused the Memorial Fund to freeze its grants to charities. The costs to the Fund were nearly £4 million (US$6.5 million). Franklin Mint counter-sued, on grounds of malicious prosecution, claiming exemplary and punitive damages and seeking $14 million. Consequently, the Fund announced in 2003 it was "legally obliged to freeze not only new grants but payment of existing grants". The case was settled out of court in 2004 with the Fund agreeing to pay £13.5 million (US$21.5 million). Franklin Mint stated, "While the precise terms of the agreement are confidential, the goal is to release funds to excellent charitable causes which resonate with the memory of the princess". By agreement with Franklin Mint, the Fund was able to pledge £14m of grants over a period of five years.
