= Broken Chair =

Monumental sculpture in Geneva

Coordinates: 46.2226°N 6.139°E

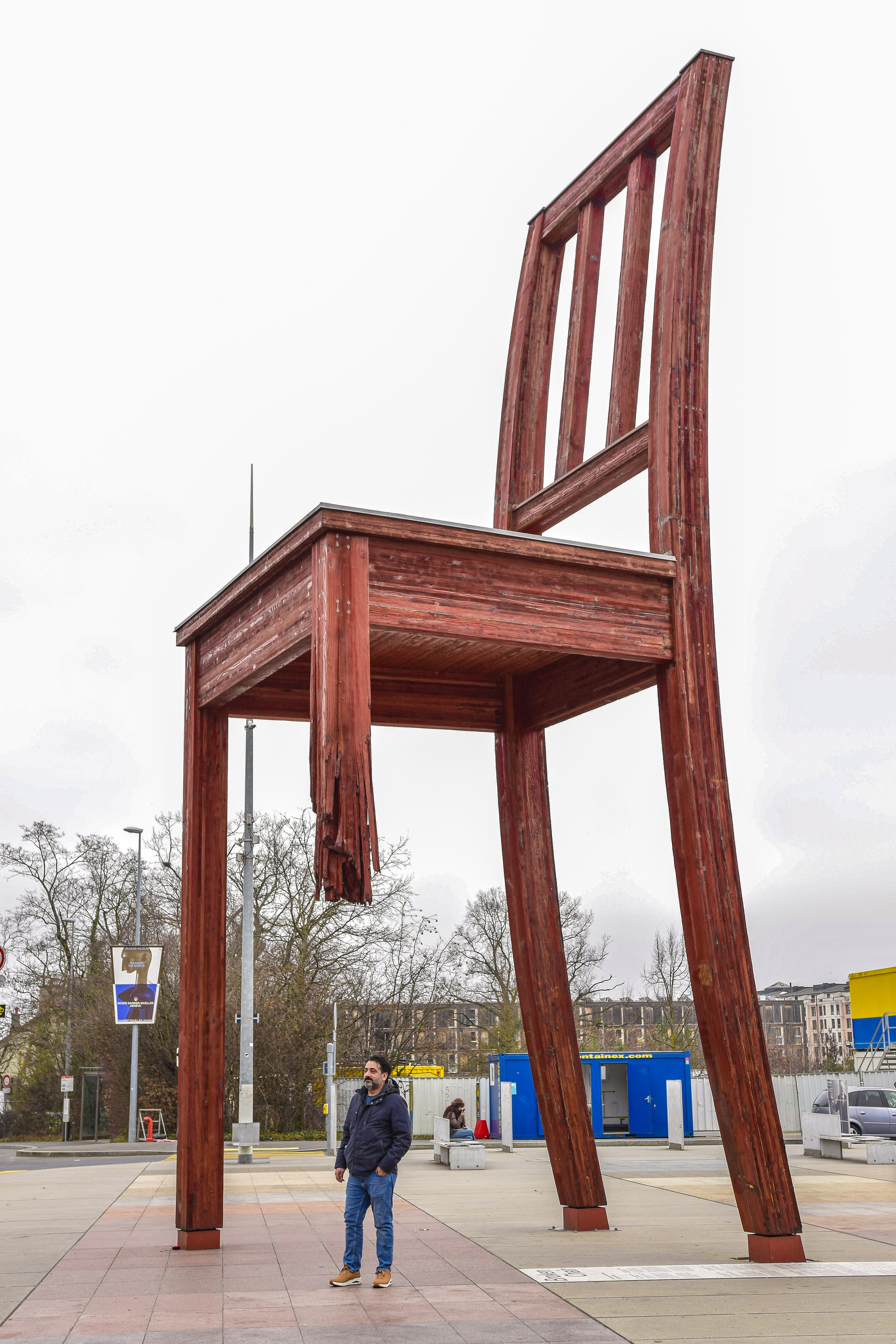
A piece of architecture located outside of Palais Des Nations "Alley of the flags"

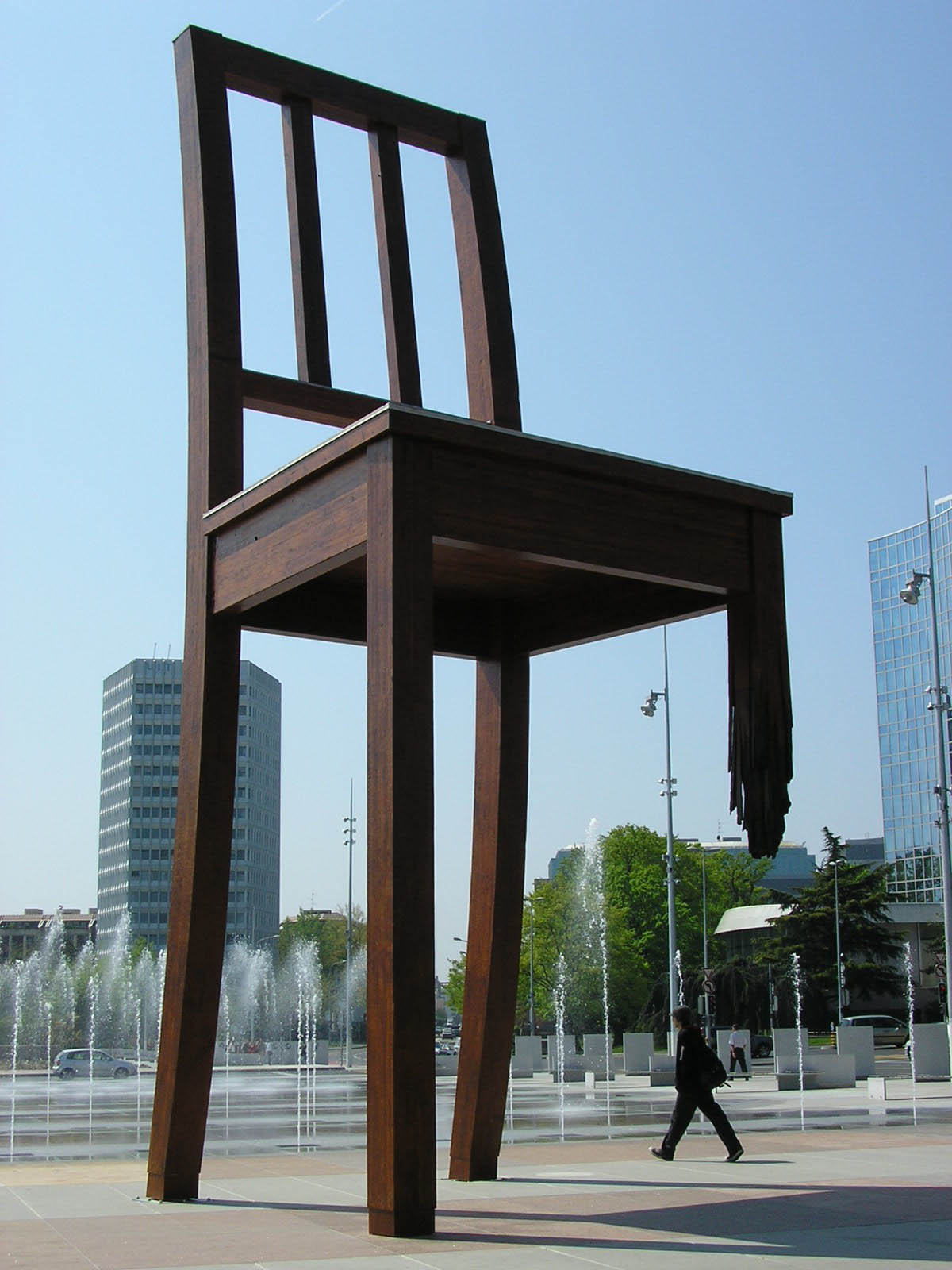
Broken Chair

Broken Chair is a monumental sculpture in wood designed by Swiss artist Daniel Berset, and constructed by carpenter Louis Genève. It is constructed of 5.5 tons of wood and is 12 metres (39 feet) high.

It depicts a giant chair with a broken leg and stands across the street from the Palace of Nations, in Geneva. It symbolises opposition to land mines and cluster bombs, and acts as a reminder to politicians and diplomats visiting Geneva.

== History ==
Broken Chair is an original idea and project of Paul Vermeulen, co-founder and director of Handicap International Switzerland. In October 1996, he commissioned the 10-meter-high (33 ft) chair, with a torn-off leg, to be installed on the Place des Nations, motivated to try to get as many nations to sign Ottawa Treaty on landmines in December 1997. The sculpture was erected by Handicap International in front of the main entrance to the Palace of Nations in Geneva on 18 August 1997, where it was intended to remain for three months, until the signing of the Ottawa Treaty in December 1997 in Ottawa. Following ratification by 40 countries, the Treaty became effective as an instrument of international law on 1 March 1999.

The failure of many countries to sign the Treaty and the strong public support for the sculpture caused it to be left in place until 2005, when it was removed to allow extensive remodeling of the Place des Nations. After completion of the work, it was reinstalled in the same place in front of the United Nations Office at Geneva on 26 February 2007.

The reinstallation of Broken Chair in February 2007 was officially dedicated by Handicap International to support the signature of an international treaty on a ban on cluster munitions, which was signed in Oslo in December 2008.

The work was the property of the sculptor until 2004, when he transferred ownership to Handicap International.

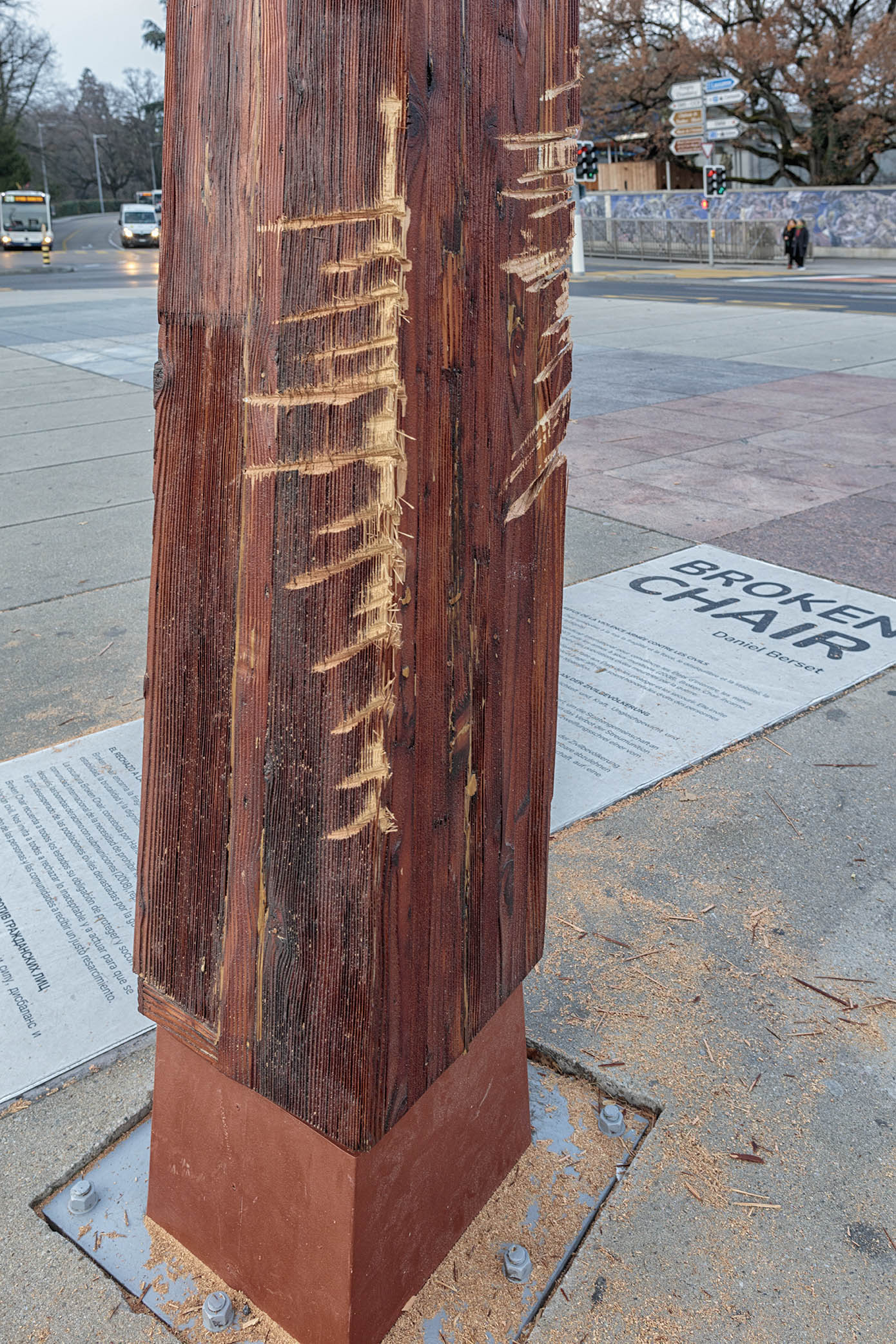
Damage to the sculpture caused by Femen activists in a December 2024 protest

On 13 December 2024, the monument was the target of an act of vandalism by topless members of the Ukrainian feminist protest group Femen, in protest Russia’s war against Ukraine and what they see as the U.N.'s failure to stop the conflict. One of the protestors used a chainsaw to make cuts in one of the legs of the chair.

== Similar sculptures ==
Giant chair sculptures by other artists include Chair in the US, and the temporary The Writer by Giancarlo Neri on Hampstead Heath in London.
