= MOREP =

The Movement Of Reform and Environment Program (MOREP) is a Lebanese political movement organization that was progressively launched through the last decade concerning plans of reform and environment program. This environment organization movement based in Lebanon is in the way of expanding environmental issues progressively wherever it is threatening the mankind since environment could not be separated from country to another.

== Early initiation and activities ==
It was initiated originally in Bsharri district, and expended through the Lebanon to save the environment. MOREP president HH Doctor Sheikh Majid Abi Saab demonstrated his commitment to the Lebanese population to protect environment and to elaborate political reform plan. In 2005, MOREP became a leading political reformist movement concerning environment, juridical, economical, and cultural movement. MOREP participated in the Cedar Revolution with pacific thought and peace.

== Environmental concerns ==
MOREP considers the environment as mankind property supported by a jurisdiction of the Council of State of Lebanon in 2002 after two years of juridical debates. It was requested by MOREPISTS activists in 1999 to save the environment. The jurisdiction of the council of state registered under the number of 298/2002 (Council of state court) was a first kind of action result in allowing activists to get involved in protecting the environment through a court, ever noted in the world of environment, a debate against a government inside the Council of State concerning quarries cutting huge mountains and destroying a whole environment. It was considered by activists that this was a prototype of resistance by a legal action against destroying the earth by such quarries.

Medical Waste methods of identification and segregation was elaborated, pushing the medical sector for their participations for reliable handling, recycling, incineration depending on medical waste subdivisions. (see table-1).

Campaigns concerning methods of making biofuel in villages, Lebanese Cedars plantations and sorting out office and kitchen waste were made during appropriate dates. Studies of Vegetable Fossils in Lebanon by the French researcher Professor Georges Barale and Dr Edouard Makhoul were supported by MOREP President Sheikh Majid Abi-Saab.

Air pollution and Mediterranean sea pollution are some of the hard concerns of MOREP during the last two years pushing the public sector and municipalities to find plan adopted from MOREP environment reform to reduce pollution specially from industries.

Another environmental concern is the Persian Gulf sea pollution from oil discharge due to the past gulf war. This Gulf is part of deep sea ecosystem which interact together with the ocean. MOREP principles and charts push the public opinion to support that deep sea ecosystem is the property of mankind environment independent of any state jurisdiction.

== The Morepists Press ==
During the year 2006 MOREP launched an editorial line for Morepists, a pacific way of negotiation opened for the Lebanese to publish their concerns about reform planning after the Lebanese war. Some of reform plans were discussed for changes proposal. A call for the Lebanese diaspora is being developed to join their patriots. Environment and general reform is actually a leading political issue in the country.

== The Corporate Social Responsibility ==
To control and prevent corruption the MOREP president suggested the implementation of the so-called Corporate social responsibility.

The project assists the integration of social and environmental concerns in business corporation and in corporate interaction with government, trade unions, business associations, and communities on voluntary basis to fight corruption and to promote economic growth.

== Actions regarding war residues ==
In 1997, sheikh Abi Saab, MOREP president, arranged an international action to remove the war residues including antipersonnel mines in the north of Lebanon. Lady Diana, Princess of Wales was working on such humanitarian activity by supporting the International Campaign to Ban Landmines. In the program was her invitation to Lebanon to promote the removal of these persistent antipersonnel landmines. She died prior to that on August 31, 1997. MOREP then launched a local campaign in 2002 to remove these antipersonnel landmines by the authorities during that period, acting with both supporting Lawyers Abdallah Zakhia and Bassam Sleiman.

An open letter to U.N. Secretary General Ban Kee-Moon was published concerning the protection of the Persian Gulf sea ecosystem.
