= Marta Maurás =

Chilean diplomat and sociologist

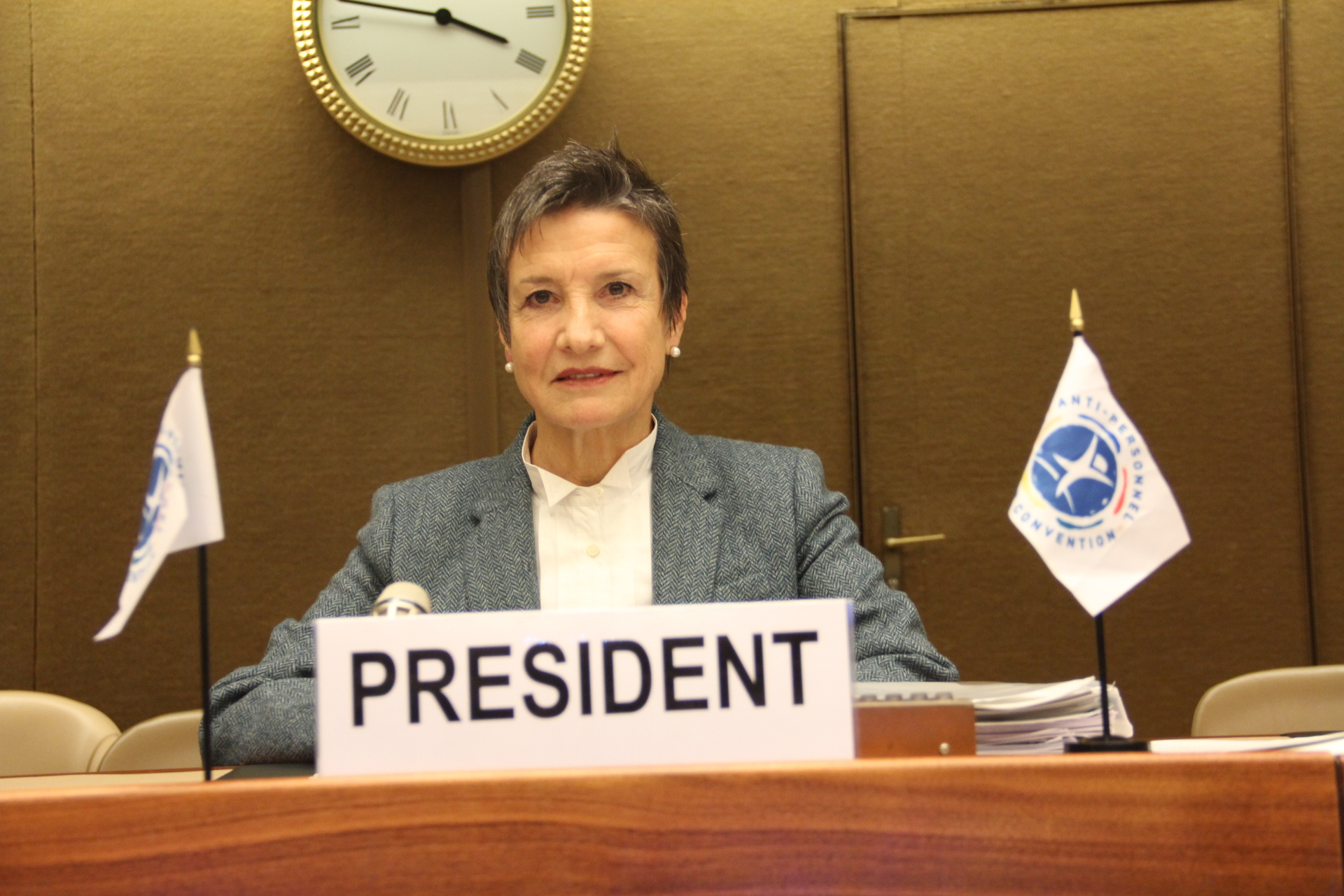
- Presiding over the Ottawa Treaty Secretariat in 2015
- Born: Marta Maurás Pérez; 1947 (age 78–79); Santiago, Chile
- Education: Pontifical Catholic University of Chile
- Occupations: Diplomat, sociologist

Marta Maurás Pérez (born 1947) is a Chilean diplomat and sociologist. Since 2014, she has been the representative of Chile to international organizations based in Geneva.

== Biography ==
A sociologist from the Pontifical Catholic University of Chile, Maurás holds certificates in Public Administration from the University of Connecticut and Language Ontology from The Newfield Group.

With a long career at the United Nations, she started with UNICEF in 1974, occupying various technical and senior management positions in Latin America and the Caribbean, Asia and Africa, including Chile, Pakistan, Mozambique, Swaziland, and New York.

From 1998 to 2005, she was called to serve in the Executive Office of the Secretary General of the United Nations, Kofi Annan, as Director for Economic and Social Affairs collaborating on the reform of the United Nations; the Millennium Summit and the establishment of the Millennium Development Goals; coordinating the SG's program against HIV/AIDS and supporting the organization of the Special Session of the General Assembly on the subject; the design of peace operations in Kosovo, East Timor, and Iraq; and coordinating the organization of the annual program of meetings with the European Union.

From 1992 to 1998, she was Regional Director of UNICEF for Latin America and the Caribbean, based in Bogotá, Colombia, where she led paradigmatic changes inspired by the rights of children and modern management. She also served as the Special Envoy of UNICEF for Latin America and the Caribbean during 2008. Previously, she served for two years as Secretary of the Economic Commission for Latin America and the Caribbean (ECLAC).

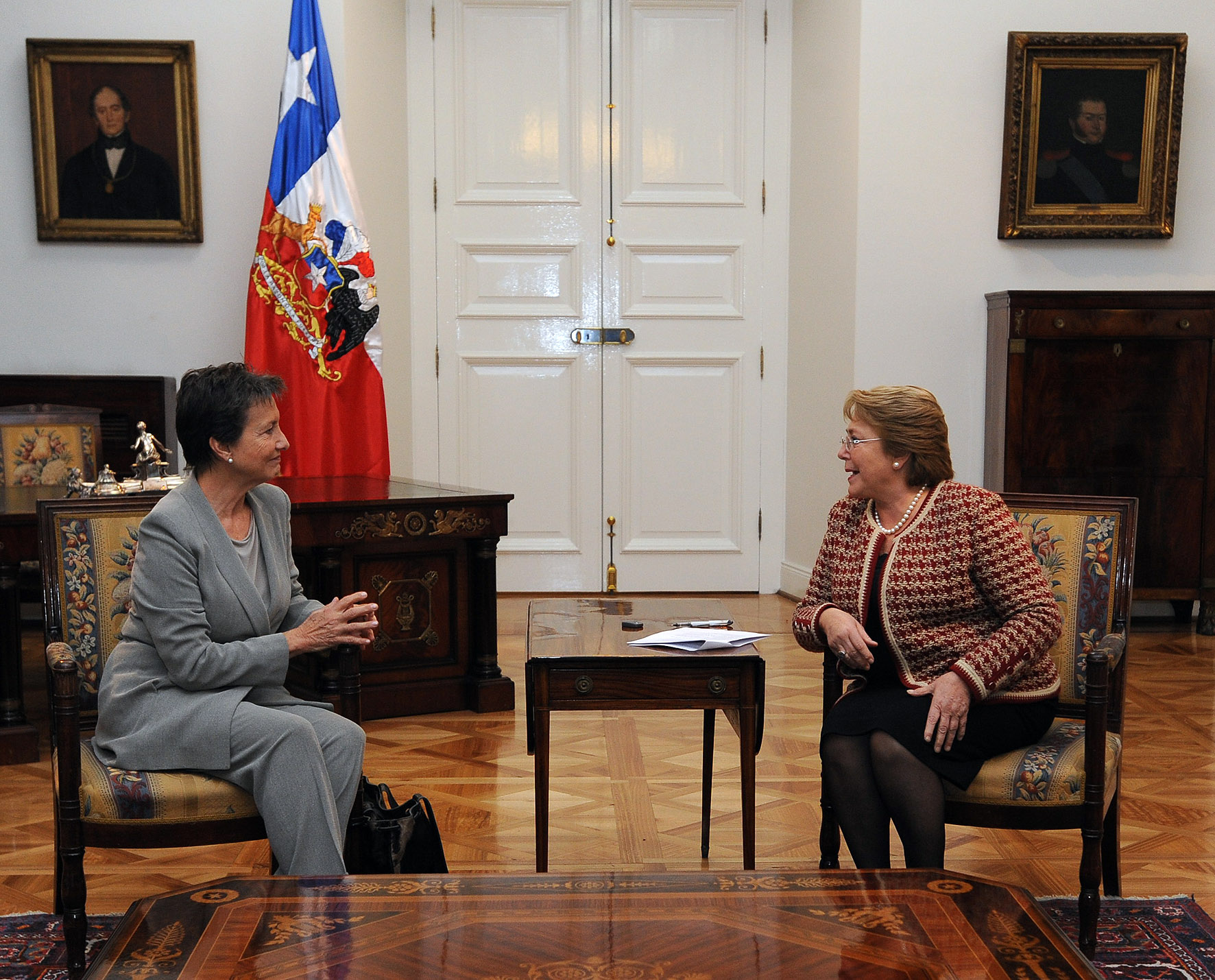
Marta Maurás and Michelle Bachelet in 2014

Maurás was also a member of the United Nations Committee on the Rights of the Child, elected by the Party States to the convention for the period 2009–2013. She was a member of the Expanded Council of the Chile21 Foundation, of the Board of Directors of Latinobarómetro Corporation, and of the Council of ComunidadMujer.

In late 2015, Maurás took responsibility for the Presidency of the Convention on the Prohibition of Antipersonnel Mines (or Ottawa Treaty), whose Secretariat and body of discussion is based in Geneva, Switzerland. The 15th Meeting of Party States that she chaired, and in which more than 100 countries participated, took place in Santiago, Chile in the last week of November and the first week of December 2016.

== Publications ==
- 2008, "La Adolescencia y la Juventud en las Políticas Públicas de Iberoamérica" [Adolescence and Youth in the Public Policies of Ibero-America]. Revista Foro 21 (in Spanish). 8 (77). Chile. July 2008.
- 2008, "An Era of Women's Leader's Rising?", International Women's Forum Global Conference, Buenos Aires, 4–6 May
- 2008, "Políticas Públicas y Protección Integral de Niños y Niñas" [Public Policies and Comprehensive Protation of Boys and Girls], 6th Encuentro de Gobernadores y Gobernadoras por la Infancia, la Adolescencia y la Juventud, Hechos y Derechos, Paipa, Colombia
- 2009, "Derechos de la Infancia, Supervivencia y Desarrollo, y Políticas Públicas" [Children's Rights, Survival, and Development, and Public Policies]. Revista DNI (in Spanish). Costa Rica. June 2009.
- 2009, "La vuelta a la Política" [The Revolution of Politics]. Revista de Economía, Política y Cultura Todo o Nada (in Spanish). January 2009.
