= Leahy War Victims Fund =

- Abbreviation: LWVF
- Successor: Marla Ruzicka Iraqi War Victims Fund
- Formation: 1989
- Founder: Senator Patrick J. Leahy
- Robert Horvath: Manager Programs for Vulnerable Populations
- Parent organization: USAID
- Budget: $10 million per year.

The Leahy War Victims Fund donates prosthetic devices and other rehabilitation services to over 250,000 people with disabilities in 40 countries through the US Agency for International Development.

== History ==
In 1985, during the Contra War, Vermont Senator Patrick J. Leahy visited the Honduras-Nicaraguan border on a fact finding tour. He noticed an eleven or twelve-year-old boy on a crutch with a leg missing because of a landmine. Through a translator, Leahy asked whether the mine the boy triggered had been laid by the Sandinista government or the Contra rebels. The boy had no idea, he just knew his life was ruined forever. After leaving Central America Leahy couldn't get the boy out of his mind.

In 1989, the fund was originally established as an earmark to Congressional legislation by Leahy. Leahy recounts that when he proposed the fund the United States State Department and USAID were unenthusiastic and helping war victims was not a foreign policy priority. It was not a "strategic objective".

Initially, the fund emphasized support for people injured by landmines. But over time the program was expanded to include individuals with spinal cord injury, children born with club foot, and individuals with cerebral palsy and a wide range of other conditions that affect mobility or physical function.

The fund opened up diplomatic relations with Vietnam.

To date, the Leahy War Victims Fund has provided nearly $225 million in assistance to more than 50 countries. As of January 2008, more than $112 million has been disbursed through 19 non-governmental organizations in 28 countries.

== Countries affected ==
In Sri Lanka the program includes the training of Sri Lankans overseas to become physical therapists and prosthetic technicians, introduces polypropylene prosthetic technology to Sri Lanka and expands rehabilitation services to include vocational training, job replacement, peer support and advocacy for mine victims.

== See also ==
- International Campaign to Ban Landmines
