= Chair (sculpture) =

Public artwork designed as an advertisement by Bassett Furniture

Coordinates: 38°51′55.44″N 76°59′22.94″W

- The Big Chair
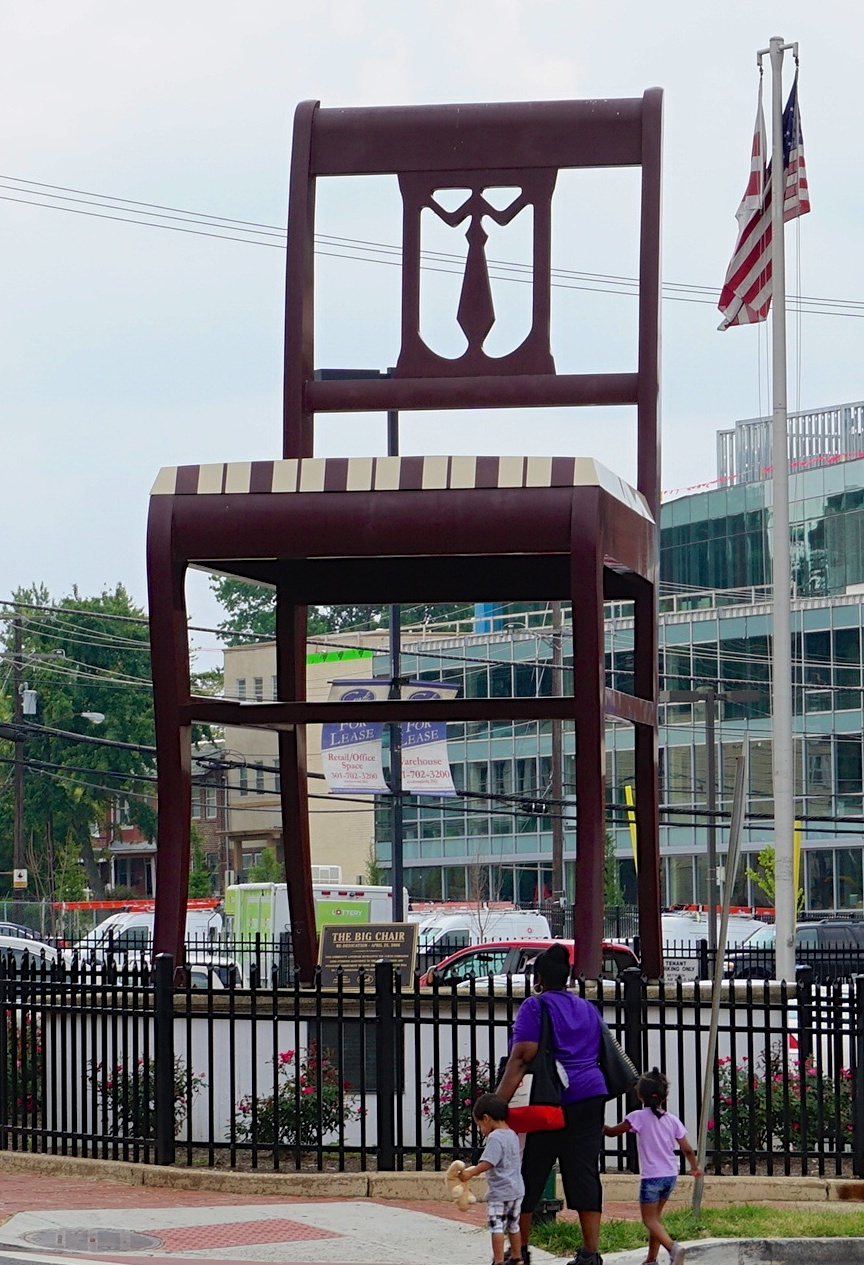
- Artist: Devery Lomax (2006 replacement); original concept by Charles Curtis; original design credited to Leo M. Hiramet
- Year: 2006 (current sculpture)
- Type: sculpture
- Dimensions: 590 cm × 370 cm (234 in × 144 in)
- Location: Washington, D.C.
- Owner: Curtis Investments

Chair, also known as the Big Chair, is a public artwork in the Anacostia neighborhood of Washington, D.C., United States. The current structure is a 2006 aluminum replica of the original mahogany chair, with the original built in 1959 as an advertisement for Curtis Brothers Furniture which closed in 1973. It stands at the intersection of Martin Luther King Jr. Avenue (formerly Nichols Avenue) SE and V Street SE.

Chair was originally surveyed as part of the Smithsonian's Save Outdoor Sculpture! survey in 1994. It was once considered the world's largest chair, but has been overtaken by works like Broken Chair in Geneva and the temporary The Writer on Hampstead Heath in London.

== Description ==
The chair, which stands 19½ feet high, is a detail-to-detail replica of a Duncan Phyfe style chair. Painted brown with a white and brown striped "cushion", the chair is entirely made of aluminum. Weighing between 4,000 and 4,600 pounds, the chair sits on a concrete base.

== Original Chair ==
The original chair on the site was built in 1959 by Virginia-based furniture maker Bassett Furniture. The concept for the chair came from Charles Curtis, of the Curtis Brothers Furniture company, as a clever way to bring customers to their family showroom which was located on the grounds where the chair is currently placed.

The piece was dedicated on July 11, 1959, and a plaque was placed with it, stating:

THE WORLD'S LARGEST CHAIR
PRESENTED TO
CURTIS BROS.
FOR THEIR OUTSTANDING LEADERSHIP
AND SERVICE TO THE PUBLIC/BY THE
BASSETT FURNITURE INDUSTRIES.
THE CHAIR MADE OF SOUND HONDURAS MAHOGANY
IS 19½ FEET TALL AND WEIGHS 4000 POUNDS
DEDICATED JULY 11, 1959
DESIGNED
LEO M. HIRAMETT
BUILT BY J. E. BASSETT, JR.

The original Curtis Brothers furniture business later closed in 1973 after economic and demographic shifts following the 1968 riots in Washington, DC.

== Replacement Chair and Re-dedication ==
By 2005, the original mahogany chair had deteriorated significantly. John Kidwell, the caretaker of the Chair, frequently patched holes that would form after heavy rains with cement. Made entirely of Honduras Mahogany, the legs had begun to rot. During August 23–24, 2005, it was disassembled and removed.

On April 25, 2006, the chair was reinstalled as a new structure made entirely of brown aluminum, replacing the 1959 original rather than restoring it. Over 250 people attended the re-dedication including Mayor Anthony A. Williams.

With the dedication of a new chair, a new plaque was placed, reading:

THE BIG CHAIR
RE-DEDICATION April 25, 2006
THIS COMMUNITY LANDMARK REPRESENTS THE CURTIS COMPANIES
LONG-STANDING ALLEGIANCE TO THE NEIGHBORHOOD AND
STEADFAST COMMITMENT TO UNITY, PROSPERITY, AND GOOD WILL
TO ALL WASHINGTONIANS AND FRIENDS OF ANACOSTIA.

This new chair was designed by Devery Lomax managed by John Kidwell. It was fabricated by Cinnbar, an Orlando-based business known for their oversized objects, and Nelson's Welding. The new chair cost over $40,000 to build. Upon its delivery, by flatbed truck, overpasses had to be avoided due to the size of the chair.

== Looking Glass House ==
On August 13, 1960, Rebecca Kirby (aka Lynn Arnold) moved "onto" the chair. A 10-by-10-foot cubicle was built and placed on the seat, furnished with a shower, bed, toilet, heater, air conditioner and balcony. Placed upon the chair by way of forklift, Kirby lived in the chair for 42 days. In the cubicle, she would watch TV, read books, and talk on the telephone, as well as dine, as her meals were delivered every day.

Kirby would step outside onto the balcony every few hours to greet visitors who learned about her living situation due to newspapers advertising her as "Alice in the Looking Glass House". Visitors would be encouraged to guess how long she'd maintain her residency. Her then 14-month-old son, Richard, visited often, being placed in a dumb waiter and sent up to see her.

After 42 days, Kirby "decided to return to earth," earning $1,500 for her stay.

== Community reception ==
Chair has been received as a part of neighborhood life since its original installation. Anacostia, a neighborhood that has seen economic and cultural ups and downs prides itself on a landmark that withstands the community's evolution.

Chair is often used as a geographic marker for direction giving and holiday celebration; Santa Claus sits upon the chair during Christmas. When the Chair was reinstalled in 2006, community members surrounded the giant, clapping, yelling and photographing the new chair.

During the riots in 1968, Chair was one of the few landmarks to go unscathed in a neighborhood heavily affected by Martin Luther King Jr.'s death.
