= Manitoba Campaign to Ban Landmines =

MBCBL logo

The Manitoba Campaign to Ban Landmines (MBCBL) was Canada's only provincial campaign to ban landmines. It was a registered non-profit organization in the province of Manitoba. The MBCBL was a member of the 1997 Nobel Peace Prize co-laureate International Campaign to Ban Landmines (ICBL), Mines Action Canada, and the Cluster Munition Coalition.

The MBCBL was launched on 1 March 2002 at a ceremony at the Manitoba Legislature in Winnipeg. Premier Gary Doer and Deputy Premier Jean Friesen attended the ceremony and were joined by students from a number of Winnipeg area schools.

The main goals of the MBCBL were to raise awareness in Manitoba of the global landmine crisis and to encourage Manitobans to take action to help solve that problem. Much of the MBCBL's outreach work was focused on engaging with schools throughout Manitoba.

In early 2005, the MBCBL launched a fundraising campaign for the One Love Project in Rwanda which raised nearly $40,000. The One Love Project builds and repairs prostheses and orthoses for landmine survivors and other disabled people. Its orthopedic workshop is based in Kigali, and its mobile clinic travels to all of Rwanda's twelve provinces. In 2007, the One Love Project began to expand its operations into neighbouring Burundi. In 2008, the MBCBL added the National Committee for Demining and Rehabilitation (NCDR) in Jordan to its fundraising efforts.

In 2014, the MBCBL underwent a change in focus and was rebranded as Manitobans Against Indiscriminate Weapons (MBAIW). The new non-profit organization continues to focus on the landmine issue but has added cluster munitions and other indiscriminate weapons to its mandate.
