= Cluster Munition Coalition =

International movement against the use of cluster munitions

The Cluster Munition Coalition (CMC) is an international civil society movement, which campaigns against the use, production, stockpiling, and transfer of cluster munitions. Cluster munitions, a type of munition stockpiled by more than 80 states, are documented to have caused significant civilian deaths and injuries and have frequently caused indiscriminate effects in both conflict and peace times. Their use is prohibited under the 2008 Convention on Cluster Munitions, a convention formally endorsed on May 30, 2008, in Dublin, Ireland, and was signed by 94 countries in Oslo on December 3–4, 2008. The Convention entered into force, becoming binding upon state parties to the convention on August 1, 2010, after 30 countries formally ratified it. As of January 4, 2012, it had been signed by 111 countries, of which 77 have ratified.

The CMC, formed in November 2003, is a network of civil society organizations, including NGOs, faith-based groups, and professional organizations. It includes large worldwide organizations, such as Amnesty International, Handicap International, and Human Rights Watch, as well as nationally based organizations (such as the Swedish Peace and Arbitration Society and Legacies of War) and national campaigns (such as the Philippines Campaign against Cluster Munitions and the Aotearoa New Zealand Cluster Munition Coalition).

All of these organizations share a common goal of preventing the adverse humanitarian and development impact of cluster munitions and providing assistance to the victims and survivors, as well as ensuring their normalization and inclusion in society. Organizations and individuals that make up the CMC also work to address the effects of cluster munitions through their work in conflict zones, providing assistance to victims, clearing areas contaminated by cluster munitions, investigating human rights abuses, and violations of international humanitarian law.

The CMC is an example of the emerging model of international diplomacy that involves the coordination of global grassroots initiatives to promote a specific goal, engaging in an international diplomatic process in partnership with like-minded states. An important focus for the CMC was to ensure those affected by cluster munitions were able to play a key role in shaping the outcome of the campaign and the international treaty it has brought about. This has been demonstrated by affected states such as Lebanon and Laos, who were at the forefront of the diplomatic negotiations, as well as the active roles played within the CMC by individual survivors of cluster bombs (such as Branislav Kapetanovic and others involved with the Ban Advocates initiative set up by Handicap International).

In 2011, the International Campaign to Ban Landmines (ICBL) and Cluster Munition Coalition (CMC) merged into one unified structure, now known as the ICBL-CMC, in order to realize operational efficiencies and reinforce complementary work. The ICBL and the CMC campaigns remain separate and continue to remind governments of their commitments to implement and promote both treaties. Landmine and Cluster Munition Monitor continues its unique civil society monitoring program on the humanitarian and developmental consequences of landmines, cluster munitions, and explosive remnants of war.

The activities of the ICBL-CMC are supported by a Governance Board including representatives of various elements of the ICBL that provides strategic, financial, and human resource oversight. An Advisory Committee provides more regular input to staff and the working of the campaign. Three ambassadors serve as campaign representatives at public events and other conferences worldwide. They include Jody Williams, Tun Channareth (Cambodian landmine survivor), and Margaret Arech Orech (Ugandan landmine survivor and founder of Ugandan Landmine Survivors Association). Currently, the ICBL has 14 staff members based in Geneva (the central office), Lyon, Paris, and Ottawa. Additionally, the ICBL-CMC hosts several interns each year.

Through their activities, the member organizations that make up the CMC have researched the effects of cluster munitions on civilians. Landmine and Cluster Munition Monitor is the ICBL-CMC's research and monitoring arm. It is the de facto monitoring regime for the Mine Ban Treaty and the Convention on Cluster Munitions. It monitors and reports on States Parties' implementation of and compliance with the Mine Ban Treaty and the Convention on Cluster Munitions, and more generally, it assesses the problems caused by landmines, cluster munitions, and other explosive remnants of war (ERW). The Monitor represents the first time that NGOs have come together in a coordinated, systematic, and sustained way to monitor humanitarian law or disarmament treaties, and to regularly document progress and problems, thereby successfully putting into practice the concept of civil society-based verification. Since its creation in 1998, Monitor research has been carried out by a global network of primarily in-country researchers, most of them ICBL-CMC campaigners, and all content undergoes rigorous editing by the Monitor's Editorial Team prior to publication.

== See also ==
- Ban Advocates
- Cluster bomb
- Convention on Certain Conventional Weapons
- Convention on Cluster Munitions
- Manitoba Campaign to Ban Landmines
- Mines Advisory Group
