= Ban Advocates =

The Cluster Munitions Ban Advocates are a group of individuals whose lives have been affected by cluster munitions, a particular type of explosive weapon that has been banned for its indiscriminate area effects and risk from unexploded ordnance. They come from Afghanistan, Albania, Cambodia, Croatia, Ethiopia, Iraq, Laos, Lebanon, Tajikistan, Serbia and Vietnam. The Ban Advocates took an active role in the Oslo Process on cluster munitions that led to the Convention on Cluster Munitions, a treaty banning cluster munitions and providing innovative provisions to assist the victims of these weapons. The Ban Advocates initiative was launched in October 2007 by Handicap International Belgium, a founding member of the Nobel Peace Prize-winning International Campaign to Ban Landmines. The Ban Advocates spoke in front of the international community on many occasions.

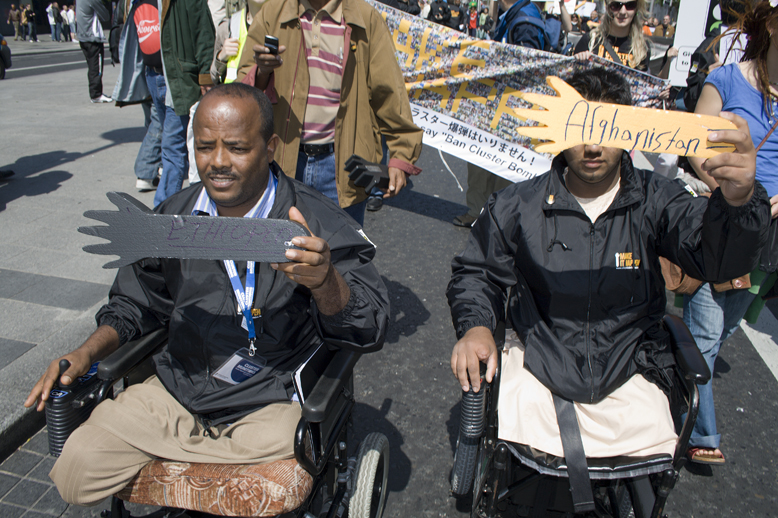
Berihu Mesele and Soraj Ghulam Habib, Ban Advocates from Afghanistan and Ethiopia demonstrating outside of the May 2008 Dublin conference

== See also ==
- Cluster bomb
- Cluster Munition Coalition
- Convention on Cluster Munitions
- Handicap International
- International Campaign to Ban Landmines
- Fares Scale of Injuries due to Cluster Munitions
