= Eddie Ndopu =

South African human rights activist (born 1990)

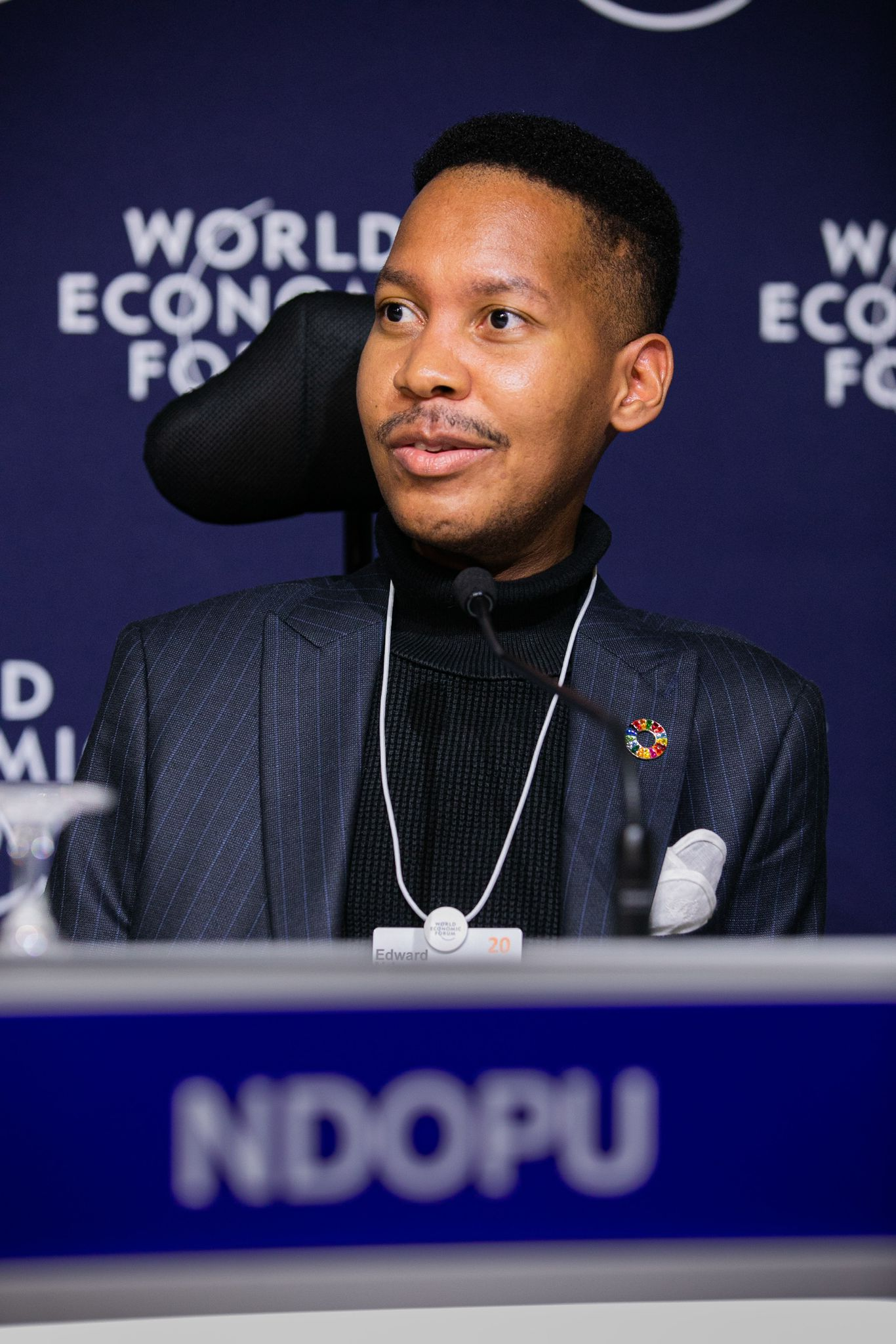
- Ndopu pictured in Davos, 2020
- Born: Edward Ndopu; 29 November 1990 (age 35); Namibia
- Education: African Leadership Academy; Carleton University; Somerville College, Oxford
- Organizations: United Nations; RTW Investments, LP; World Economic Forum; Amnesty International; Global Strategy for Inclusive Education (Founder); Humanity & Inclusion (UK)
- Known for: Humanitarian Advocacy; Human Rights Activism; Disability Justice Advocacy

Eddie Ndopu (born 1990) is a South African disability rights advocate. He is one of 17 global advocates appointed by the Secretary-General of the United Nations for the Sustainable Development Goals.

== Background ==
Eddie Ndopu was born in Namibia in 1990, after his single mother had fled apartheid South Africa by going into self-imposed exile. At the age of two Ndopu was diagnosed with spinal muscular atrophy, a degenerative disease that affects the nervous system, and was given until the age of five to live. When he was aged nine, he moved to Cape Town, South Africa.

== Education ==
In 2008 Ndopu graduated as part of the inaugural class of the African Leadership Academy. He then graduated summa cum laude with an interdisciplinary studies degree from Carleton University in Canada. During this time Ndopu was invited to give a presentation about his work at a 'Master's Tea' at Yale University. Between 2016 and 2017, Ndopu, who self-identifies as queer and a feminist, became the first African student with a degenerative disability to be admitted to the University of Oxford on a full scholarship at the Blavatnik School of Government; based at Somerville College, he graduated with a masters in public policy.

== Work and activism ==
Ndopu was invited by the Global Changemakers programme to attend the World Economic Forum on Africa where he met with the Founder and Executive chairman, Professor Klaus Schwab. During Ndopu's second year at Carleton University he was consequently commissioned by the World Economic Forum, at the behest of Professor Klaus Schwab, to produce a White Paper on the role of the private sector in addressing the global youth unemployment crisis.

Ndopu also undertook a program associate position at the now-defunct Clinton Global Initiative's Global Minimum InLabs project. Ndopu served as the Regional Youth Coordinator for Africa at Amnesty International. In 2009, Ndopu founded the Global Strategy for Inclusive Education, a campaign to facilitate the educational rights of children with disabilities living in developing economies.

In 2018, Ndopu became Humanity & Inclusion's Global Ambassador supporting the rights of children with disabilities living in developing countries. Ndopu is the special adviser for impact and corporate sustainability to the Partners of RTW Investments.

In 2019, Antonio Guterres – Secretary-General of the United Nations – appointed Ndopu as one of 17 eminent advocates for the Sustainable Development Goals .

== Recognition ==
Ndopu became a Global Changemaker in 2008. The Global Changemakers programme invited him to attend the World Economic Forum in South Africa. He has been recognised by Pacific Standard as one of their "top 30 thinkers under 30", by Shaw Trust and Powerful Media as one of the 50 most influential people with disabilities in the world, and by South Africa's Mail & Guardian as one of their annual "top 200 young South Africans" for 2019.
