= Ottawa Treaty =

1997 anti-personnel landmine ban treaty

Ottawa Treaty (Mine Ban Treaty)
Convention on the Prohibition of the Use, Stockpiling, Production and Transfer of Anti-Personnel Mines and on their Destruction
- Signed and ratified the Ottawa Treaty Acceded or succeeded to the treaty Withdrawn
- Drafted: 18 September 1997
- Signed: 3 December 1997
- Location: Ottawa, Ontario, Canada
- Effective: 1 March 1999
- Condition: Ratifications by 40 states
- Signatories: 133
- Parties: 162 (complete list)
- Depositary: Secretary-General of the United Nations
- Languages: Arabic, Chinese, English, French, Russian, and Spanish

The Convention on the Prohibition of the Use, Stockpiling, Production and Transfer of Anti-Personnel Mines and on their Destruction of 1997, known informally as the Ottawa Treaty, the Anti-Personnel Mine Ban Convention, or often simply the Mine Ban Treaty, aims at eliminating anti-personnel landmines (APLs) around the world.

By August 2025, 162 states had ratified or acceded to the treaty. Major powers, which are also past and current manufacturers of landmines, are not parties to the treaty. These include the United States, China, and Russia. Other non-signatories include India and Pakistan.

In 2025, Poland, Lithuania, Latvia, Estonia and Finland formally began the procedure to withdraw from the Ottawa Treaty. The three Baltic States, Finland and Poland completed the withdrawal in December 2025, January 2026 and February 2026 respectively. Amidst use of mines by non-signatory belligerent Russia during the Russo-Ukrainian War, Ukraine has not followed the treaty and in 2025 also announced the intent to withdraw, though the treaty stipulates that it should remain in effect until the end of the conflict.

== Chronology ==
1939
Landmines are first used widely in World War II.
1977
During the Geneva Convention, one provision is amended to prohibit the targeting of civilian populations by indiscriminate weapons in wartime.
1980
October: The Convention on Prohibitions or Restrictions on the Use of Certain Conventional Weapons Which May Be Deemed to Be Excessively Injurious or to Have Indiscriminate Effects (CCW) is adopted by a United Nations Conference in Geneva. Among the three annexed Protocols the "Protocol on prohibitions or restrictions on the Use of Mines, Booby-Traps and Other Devices" (Protocol II) establishes some restrictions on the use of anti-personnel landmines.
1991
Six NGOs supporting a ban of landmines begin organizing the International Campaign to Ban Landmines (ICBL), established the following year.
1992
October: The Steering committee of the ICBL issues a call for an international ban on the use, production, stockpiling and sale, transfer or export of anti-personnel landmines.
1993
9 February: France formally submits a request to the Secretary-General of the UN to convene a Review Conference of the Convention on Certain Conventional Weapons (CCW) in accordance with its Article 8 in order to strengthen the provisions in the Convention on the use of anti-personnel landmines. The First International NGO Conference on Landmines is held in London, organised by the ICBL and acknowledging Jody Williams as the organization's coordinator. The US Department of State publishes its report Hidden Killer: The Global Problem with Uncleared Landmines, and the ICBL issues the study Landmines: A Deadly Legacy.
16 December: The UN General Assembly adopts Resolution 48/79 which formally welcomes the request to convene a Review Conference of the CCW, encourages the establishment of a group of governmental experts to prepare this Conference and calls upon the maximum number of States to attend (operative paragraphs 5–7).
1994
24 February: The President of the International Committee of the Red Cross (ICRC), Cornelio Sommaruga, declares that from a humanitarian point of view, a "worldwide ban on anti-personnel mines [is] the only truly effective solution" to come to terms with the problem. Subsequently, certain UN bodies such as the Office of the United Nations High Commissioner for Refugees (UNHCR), the United Nations Children's Fund, and the Secretary-General himself call for a total ban on anti-personnel mines.
10 July: The Group of Seven Industrialised Nations (G7) at its meeting in Naples inter alia assign priority to the problem of anti-personnel mines (APMs).
September: At the United Nations General Assembly (UNGA) US President Bill Clinton calls for the "eventual elimination" of anti-personnel mines.
15 December: The UN General Assembly adopts Resolution 49/75 D "Moratorium on the Export of Anti-Personnel Land-Mines", which urges States to declare such a moratorium, stating, inter alia:

Recognizing that States can move effectively towards the ultimate goal of the eventual elimination of anti-personnel land-mines as viable and humane alternatives are developed.

Emphasizes the importance of the Convention on Prohibitions or Restrictions on the Use of Certain Conventional Weapons Which May Be Deemed to Be Excessively Injurious or to Have Indiscriminate Effects and its Protocols as the authoritative international instrument governing the responsible use of anti-personnel land-mines and related devices. [operative paragraph 4]

Encourages further international efforts to seek solutions to the problems caused by anti-personnel-mines, with a view to their eventual elimination [operative paragraph 6].

=== Early action and draft Conventions ===
1994
Self-imposed moratorium on sales of mines dated 15 March 1994
1995
The first national law to ban anti-personnel landmines is passed in Belgium.
12 May: The Council of the European Union adopts a "Common Action" on anti-personnel landmines including a common moratorium on the export of anti-personnel landmines. The improvement of the legal restrictions on the use of anti-personnel mines contained in Protocol II of the Convention on Certain Conventional Weapons (CCW) proves to be an uphill task. Four meetings of the group of governmental experts are necessary to prepare the basis for the Review Conference of this Convention because of difficulties in reaching consensus.
25 September to 13 October: The first Review Conference of the 1980 Convention on Certain Conventional Weapons (CCW) is held in Vienna (Austria). The focus is on its Protocol II, as it is the authoritative international instrument governing the responsible use of anti-personnel land-mines. Many improvements are proposed, but in spite of intensive debates, do not find consensus. The Review Conference therefore has to be suspended.
12 December: The United Nations General Assembly adopts Resolution 50/70 O "Moratorium on the Export of Anti-Personnel Land-Mines", urging States to declare such a moratorium and to build consensus towards an agreement when the Review Conference (of the CCW Convention) reconvenes. It states, inter alia:

Also encourages further immediate international efforts to seek solutions to the problems caused by anti-personnel land-mines, with a view to the eventual elimination of anti-personnel land-mines [operative paragraph 6].

1996
15–19 January: The Review Conference of the CCW resumes its work in Geneva but cannot find consensus on the reforms proposed to improve Protocol II.
April: The first draft of what later became the "Ottawa Convention" is informally made by the Austrian representative at the Review Conference of the Convention on Certain Conventional Weapons (CCW), Werner Ehrlich, out of frustration with the lack of progress achieved towards a total ban at this Conference. This first Draft provides already for a complete prohibition of the use, production, transfer and stockpiling of anti-personnel mines, and requires destruction of stockpiles within one year of entry into force and clearance of laid anti-personnel mines within five years. It represents the essence of what will subsequently be elaborated into the first Austrian Draft text of the Anti-Personnel Mine Ban Convention.
22 April – 3 May 1996: The Review Conference of the CCW resumes its work in Geneva.
28 April: At the presentation of the first draft of the Convention by the author at a meeting among States supporting a total ban and relevant NGOs, this project is seen only as a "remote possibility", and therefore not even discussed.
3 May: At the resumed Review Conference of the CCWC in Geneva the Amended Protocol II is finally adopted by consensus. The reaction of many States to this result is quite negative as its provisions are widely considered to be overly complex and insufficiently stringent to deal with the humanitarian crisis created by APMs. The new restrictions on the use of APMs are qualified even as "woefully inadequate" by the ICRC. At the closing session of the Review Conference Canada announces that it will host a meeting of pro-ban States in summer, while the Austrian Representative announces the preparation of the draft of a Convention on a total ban of APMs.
May: At an expert meeting of the European Union Ehrlich proposes to revise the "Common Action" adopted on 12 May 1995, in order to move ahead and to support the project of a Convention on a total ban of APMs; and suggests that the EU should prepare the draft of a Resolution on an enlarged moratorium (including use and production of APMs) and on a total ban for the next General Assembly of the UN. The first proposal finds consensus, not the second one, which was later taken up by Canada and by the US.
26 June: First debate on the Draft by – sceptical – like-minded countries and selected NGOs at a small strategy meeting at the Quaker UN Office in Geneva.
7 July: This Draft is circulated by the Quaker UN Office in Geneva to three like-minded Countries, Austria, Canada and Switzerland and to selected NGOs, to UNICEF and UNIDIR.
30 September: An improved second draft of the Convention on a total ban on APMs, taking into account numerous comments and suggestions received, is prepared by Ehrlich for the 1996 Ottawa Conference.
1 October: The Council of the European Union adopts – after difficult negotiations – a new Common Action on APMs, which constitutes a big step forward as its Article 2 supports the early conclusion of an international agreement on a total ban on APMs. This is a remarkable decision, as a number of EU-Members consider anti-personnel mines as a military necessity, but this open support comes not without a mental reservation: As those negotiations were supposed to take place in the framework of the Conference on Disarmament, each Member would have the possibility to block them at any time.
3–5 October: The 1996 Ottawa Conference (The Ottawa International Strategy Conference). Due to the presence of countries openly opposing a total ban in Ottawa, consensus is difficult to achieve. The political "Ottawa Declaration" is accepted only in the last moment, after protracted negotiations. The main document, the Agenda for Action on Anti-Personnel (AP) Mines, fails to get consensus. Due to a compromise proposed by Austria it is finally accepted, but only as "paper of the Chairman". The purpose of the Conference is "to catalyze practical efforts to move toward a ban and to create partnerships ... essential to building the necessary political will to achieve a global ban on AP mines". The project of a Convention on a Total Ban of APMs, advocated by the Austrian representative, Werner Ehrlich, is therefore low on the agenda and produces mainly negative reactions, including from like-minded countries, considering it to be premature, from the European Union – which blocks the distribution of the prepared Draft at the Conference, and even from leading humanitarian organizations, such as the International Committee of the Red Cross (ICRC) and the International Campaign to Ban Landmines (ICBL), fearing waste of time and detraction from the priority of urgent practical measures. The turning point is the announcement by the Austrian representative, that no time must wasted as he has a complete Draft of such a Convention at his disposal, and his invitation to start immediately a fast-track, free-standing negotiating process in Vienna – outside the UN Conference on Disarmament (CD) – notoriously blocked for many years by the lack of consensus. The Canadian Minister for Foreign Affairs, Lloyd Axworthy, instantly supports this proposal as a chance for a successful conclusion of the Conference and decides to task Austria with preparing the draft for these negotiations, suggesting that they should be concluded by the end of the year 1997 in Ottawa. This important decision is reflected in the text of the "Chairmen's Agenda for Action on Anti-Personnel (AP) Mines" as follows: "To lay the necessary groundwork for a legally-binding international agreement to ban AP mines, Austria will produce a first draft and Canada will produce a possible framework for the verification of such an agreement". Minister Lloyd Axworthy thereby starts the so-called "Ottawa Process", while countries opposed to a total ban are too shocked and too surprised to block this initiative.
November: A further enhanced third draft of the Anti-Personnel Mine Ban Convention is prepared by Ehrlich and sent out worldwide. It is later known as the First Austrian Draft and is the basis for the forthcoming negotiations on this Convention.
10 December: The General Assembly of the United Nations adopts Resolution 51/45 S: "An International Agreement to Ban Anti-Personnel Land-Mines", which is supported by 115 co-sponsors. In its first operative paragraph States are urged "to pursue vigorously an effective, legally binding international agreement to ban the use, stockpiling, production and transfer of anti-personnel landmines with a view to completing the negotiations as soon as possible".
20 December: Draft of the ICBL: The International Campaign to Ban Landmines presents its own draft of a Convention on a total ban of APMs. Much of its language would subsequently be reflected in the text of the Convention adopted.
Belgian Draft: Belgium, one of the first supporters of a total ban treaty, also prepares a draft of such a treaty, which however appears to have had little direct influence on the later Austrian drafts.
1997
10 January: Austria adopts the first law on a comprehensive, permanent total ban of APMs. It goes beyond the earlier Belgian law which was limited in its effect to 5 years and did not exclude stockpiling of APMs allowing thereby the use of APM in case of emergency.

=== Threats to the comprehensive nature of the Convention ===
A major threat to the project of a Total ban Convention as endorsed by the 1996 Ottawa Conference was the danger of being watered down.

One example was the well-intended attempt made by Canada to win the support of Countries opposed to a total ban – in particular the US – by proposing a new approach: To replace the Draft Convention by a new text, composed of a "Chapeau-Convention", containing generalities only, and four annexed protocols, each one dealing with one of the main prohibitions: production, stockpiling, transfer and use of anti-personnel mines. This approach would allow some additional countries to join the process but at the price of allowing them to pick and choose only those prohibitions compatible with their military needs. This concept, which would keep only the appearance of a total ban treaty, would risk creating a confusing situation of varying legal situations, and would, in the first place, postpone a real comprehensive total ban, potentially indefinitely. This proposal did however not materialise as the US rebuffed the idea, believing that they could steer the negotiations into the Conference on Disarmament where it would be subject to the consensus rule.

=== Attempts to block the project of a Total Ban Convention ===
Countries opposing a total ban of APMs because of their military necessities had an interest to prevent any negotiations on a total ban and in particular in free standing negotiations as proposed by Austria.

The smart way to achieve this aim was to insist on holding the relevant negotiations in the framework of the competent forum of the UN for disarmament negotiations, the Conference on Disarmament (CD). The catch is that the CD had many years previously become a dead end, because of fundamental disagreements among Member States on its agenda and because of the rule of consensus giving each member de facto the right of veto.

=== Further developments ===
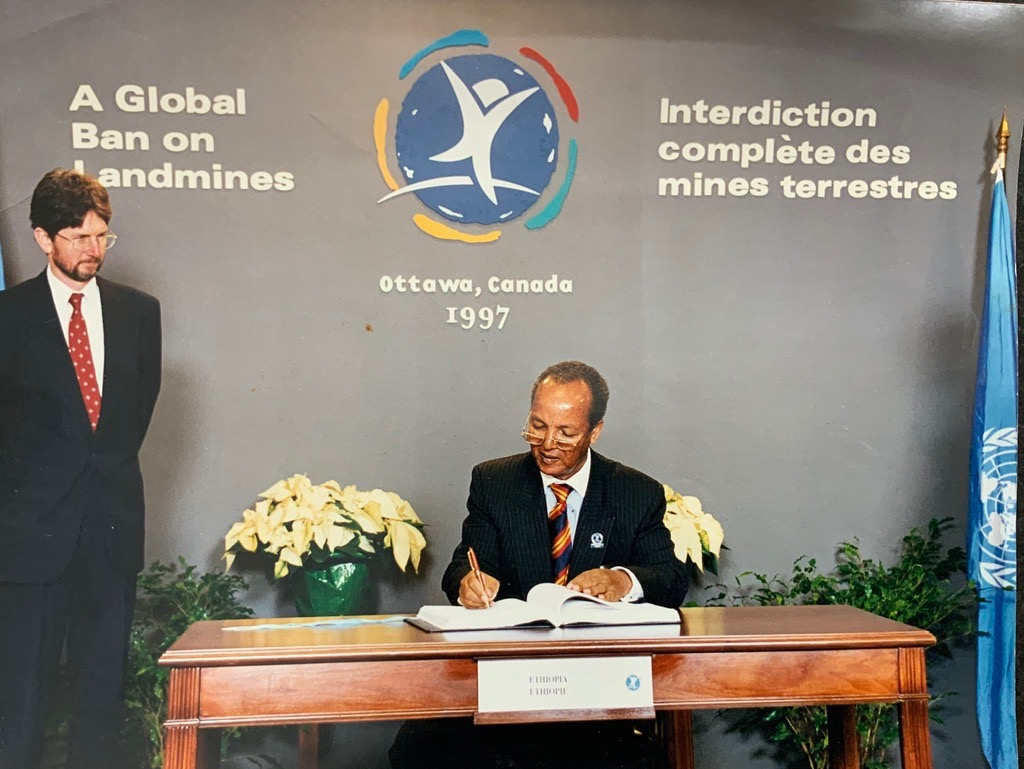
Ambassador Dr. Fecadu is representing Ethiopia, signing the Ottawa Treaty in 1997.

1997
17 January: The White House declares that the US will seek to initiate negotiations on a worldwide treaty banning the use, production, stockpiling and transfer of anti-personnel landmines in the framework of the Conference on Disarmament (CD) in Geneva.
30 January: In the CD the United Kingdom proposes the mandate for an ad hoc committee on a ban on APMs, which is not accepted. In the CD later Hungary and Japan make other, similarly unsuccessful, attempts in this direction.
12–14 February: The 1997 Vienna Conference (The Expert Meeting on the Text of a Convention to Ban Anti-Personnel Mines) is the first formal follow-up to the 1996 Ottawa Conference. It provides States with an initial opportunity to comment directly on the "First Austrian Draft" of the Convention. Representatives of 111 Governments attend this Conference. NGOs are allowed to attend the plenary sessions; the UN and the ICRC were invited to participate even in the closed meetings. Only a few governments speak out against a total ban treaty.
14 March: The Second Austrian Draft is completed, which, due to comments and suggestions received at the Vienna Conference, differs quite significantly from the first draft.
March: Other attempts to replace the "Ottawa Process" by negotiations in the framework of the Conference on Disarmament (CD) are undertaken by opponents of a total ban. Some EU countries prompt the Netherlands to propose in the CD a draft mandate for negotiations on a total ban of APMs. But this proposal is blocked by other EU states opposing an immediate ban.
27 March: At the CD Finland and Poland table a formal proposal to appoint a Special Coordinator for mine negotiations.
5–24 April: The 1997 Bonn Conference (FRG) (the International Expert Meeting on Possible Verification Measures to Ban Anti-Personnel Landmines in Bonn) is the second formal follow-up gathering to the 1996 Ottawa Conference and is attended by 121 governments. The German "Options Paper for a possible verification scheme for a convention to ban anti-personnel landmines" suggests significant and intrusive verification measures common in disarmament treaties. As opinions diverge, only some progress in this field is achieved. The spirit of the concept is reflected inter alia in the first paragraph of Article 8 of the Convention.
End of April: France, previously an ardent supporter of tackling the mine issue in the framework of the Conference on Disarmament (CD), realizes that the free negotiating process is irreversible and joins the process as the first member of the UN Security Council.
14 May: The Third Austrian Draft is issued. It includes small changes from the previous Second Draft, e. g. regarding compliance issues, the question of duration, and the possibility of withdrawal from the Convention.
21 May: The United Kingdom – previously supporting negotiations in the CD – announces that it is joining the process as the second member of the UN Security Council.
24–27 June: The 1997 Brussels Conference (The Brussels International Conference for a Comprehensive Ban on Anti-Personnel Landmines) provides a clear selection process for the forthcoming diplomatic conference in Oslo. It identifies the Third Austrian Draft formally as the basis for its negotiations, agrees that a two-thirds majority was necessary for any substantive changes of this Draft, limits the voting right to States having adhered to the Brussels Declaration, and allows the ICBL to participate as a full observer, despite concerns from a number of States. The essential elements of the Convention are resumed in the "Brussels Declaration", signed by 97 of the 156 States attending the Conference. Even during the Brussels Conference new attempts are made to divert the negotiations on the Convention to the Conference on Disarmament.
26 June: In the CD an agreement is reached to appoint a Special Coordinator for APMs tasked to try to find an agreed mandate that could form the basis for discussions.
14 August: In the CD the special Coordinator for APMs declares that there is little point in the CD taking any decisions on a possible mandate on APMs until the outcome of the Ottawa Process is known in December 1997. This signals the end of efforts to undercut the Ottawa Process in the CD.
18 August: The United States finally joins the Ottawa Process. The White House announces that the US will be a full participant in the negotiations at the forthcoming Oslo Diplomatic Conference. But in a letter to key foreign ministers the US Secretary of State, Madeleine Albright, lays down five conditions for the US's possible signature of the treaty:
- a geographical exception for the use of mines in South Korea;
- a change of the definition of APMs to allow the use of mixed anti-tank and anti-personnel "munitions" systems;
- a transition period with either entry into force requiring 60 countries, including all five permanent members of the Security Council and at least 75 per cent of historic producers and users of APMs, or an optional nine-year deferral period for compliance with certain provisions;
- a strengthening of the verification regime; and
- a clause permitting a party to withdraw when its superior national interests are threatened.
1–19 September: The 1997 Oslo Conference (the Oslo Diplomatic Conference on an International Total Ban on Anti-Personnel Land Mines). Its purpose, the final negotiation and formal adoption of the Treaty, is achieved only after intensive debates on the conditions presented by the US and on numerous other new proposals on 18 September 1997, after the US delegation announces that it is withdrawing its proposals as it had been unable to garner the necessary support for them. The convention is then formally adopted.
3–4 December: The 1997 Ottawa Conference (the Convention-signing Conference and Mine Action Forum). In accordance with its Article 15, the Convention is opened for signature in Ottawa at a formal treaty signing conference. In total 150 governments attend the Conference and 121 sign the Convention at the Conference (Kenya (no. 122) signs on 5 December). This achievement is described by the Canadian Prime Minister, Jean Chrétien, as "without precedent or parallel in either international disarmament or international humanitarian law". The final Conference Document, the 67-page "Program for Mine Action", details "pledges of more than 500 million dollars to the mine effort over a five-year period".
5 December: The Convention is deposed in New York with the Secretary General of the United Nations, and opened for further signatures.
9 December: The General Assembly of the United Nations adopts by 142 votes Resolution 52/38 a "Convention on the Prohibition of the Use, Stockpiling, Production and Transfer of Anti-Personnel Mines and on their Destruction", welcoming inter alia the conclusion of negotiations on 18 September of the Convention in Oslo, inviting "all States to sign the Convention" (operative paragraph 1) and urging "all States to ratify the Convention without delay subsequent to their signatures" (operative paragraph 2). Jody Williams and the ICBL are awarded the Nobel Peace Prize.
1998
The treaty reaches its 40th ratification, triggering its entry into force the next year. The ICBL launches the Landmine Monitor initiative to verify compliance with the treaty.
1999
The treaty becomes binding international law on 1 March 1999.
2003
The first stockpile destruction deadlines are met by all states parties with stockpiles.
2014
The United States under President Barack Obama mostly accepts the terms of the treaty by ceasing to acquire anti-personnel land mines and prohibiting their use outside of the Korean Peninsula.
2020
The United States under President Donald Trump reverses the Obama policy change and restores the George W. Bush administration position on anti-personnel landmines, authorizing Combatant Commanders to employ "advanced, non-persistent landmines".
2022
President of the United States Joe Biden reverses the policy of his predecessor, Trump, and continues disarmament, saying that the United States will not produce or acquire anti-personnel mines, will not support any other country in its use of these mines, and commits to destroying all existing anti-personnel mines in its possession (excluding those on the Korean Peninsula).
2024
Biden partly reverses his previous position and agrees to deliver anti-personnel mines to the Ukrainian government for use against Russian invaders, despite Ukraine being treaty signatory.
2025
Poland, Lithuania, Latvia, Estonia and Finland formally notify the UN of their intent to leave the Ottawa Treaty. Ukraine announces the intent to withdraw.

== Implementation ==
=== Treaty terms ===
Besides ceasing the production and development of anti-personnel mines, a party to the treaty must destroy its stockpile of anti-personnel mines within four years, although it may retain a small number for training purposes (mine-clearance, detection, etc.). Within ten years after ratifying the treaty, the country should have cleared all of its mined areas. This is a difficult task for many countries, but at the annual meetings of the States Parties they may request an extension and assistance. The treaty also calls on States Parties to provide assistance to mine-affected persons in their own country and to provide assistance to other countries in meeting their treaty obligations.

The treaty covers only anti-personnel mines; it does not address mixed mines, anti-tank mines, remote-controlled claymore mines, anti-handling devices (booby traps), and other "static" explosive devices.

=== Destruction of stockpiles ===
Signatory nations have destroyed more than 48 million stockpiled mines since the treaty's entry into force on 1 March 1999. As of June 2017, 159 countries had completed the destruction of their stockpiles or declared that they did not possess stockpiles to destroy. Sri Lanka reported in September 2021 that they had finished destroying their stockpile.

=== Retention of landmines ===
Article 3 of the treaty permits countries to retain landmines for use in training in mine detection, mine clearance, or mine destruction techniques. 72 countries have taken this option. Of this group, 26 States Parties retain fewer than 1,000 mines. Only two have retained more than 10,000 mines: Turkey (15,100) and Bangladesh (12,500). A total of 83 States Parties have declared that they do not retain any antipersonnel mines, including 27 states that stockpiled antipersonnel mines in the past. Canada retains mines for training, and also continues to make and use the "C19 Detonated Weapon" in combat. The latter does not qualify as a landmine under the treaty because it is fired by a person and not by a pressure plate.

=== Landmine-free countries ===
Through 2015, 29 countries had cleared all known mined areas from their territory: Albania, Bhutan, Bulgaria, Burundi, Republic of the Congo, Costa Rica, Denmark, Djibouti, France, Gambia, Germany, Guinea-Bissau, Greece, Guatemala, Honduras, Hungary, Jordan, Malawi, Mozambique, Nicaragua, Nigeria, North Macedonia, Rwanda, Suriname, Swaziland, Tunisia, Uganda, and Venezuela. El Salvador finished clearing its landmines before joining the Treaty.

At the November–December 2009 Cartagena Summit for a Mine-Free World, Albania, Greece, Rwanda, and Zambia were also declared mine-free. On 2 December 2009, Rwanda was declared free of landmines. It followed a three-year campaign by 180 Rwandan soldiers, supervised by the Mine Awareness Trust and trained in Kenya, to remove over 9,000 mines laid in the country between 1990 and 1994. The soldiers checked and cleared 1.3 square km of land in twenty minefields. The official Cartagena Summit announcement came after the Rwandan Ministry of Defence's own announcement of the completion of the demining process on 29 November 2009. Under Article 5 of the Ottawa Treaty, Rwanda was requested to become mine-free by 1 December 2010.

On 18 June 2010, Nicaragua was declared free of landmines.

Two more countries became free of landmines in 2011. On 14 June 2011, Nepal was declared a landmine-free zone, making it the second country to be landmine-free in Asia. In December 2011, Burundi was declared landmine free.

On 5 December 2012 at the 12th Meeting of the States Parties, six states declared themselves landmine-free. These were the Republic of the Congo, Denmark, Gambia, Guinea-Bissau, Jordan, and Uganda.

On 17 September 2015, Mozambique was declared free of land mines after the last of some nearly 171,000 had been cleared over 20 years.

The last land mines in the Falkland Islands were removed by 2020.

== Landmine and Cluster Munition Monitor ==
The Landmine and Cluster Munition Monitor ("the Monitor") is an initiative providing research for the ICBL and the Cluster Munition Coalition (CMC), and acting as their de facto monitoring regime.

As an initiative of ICBL which was founded in 1998 through Human Rights Watch, the Monitor gives monitoring on the humanitarian development and uses of landmines, cluster munitions, and explosive remnants of war (ERW). It provides reports on all aspects of the landmine, cluster munitions, and ERW issues. It issues annual report updates on all countries in the world, keeps an international network with experts, provides research findings for all mediums, and remains flexible to adapt its reports to any changes. The Monitor has earned respect with its transparency whose states must be provided under the relevant treaties for independent reporting. Its main audiences are not only governments, NGOs, and other international organizations, but also media, academics and the public.

== States parties ==
The Convention gained 122 country signatures when it opened for signing on 3 December 1997 in Ottawa, Canada. Currently, there are 165 States Parties to the Treaty. Thirty-two countries have not signed the treaty. The states that have not signed the treaty includes a majority of the permanent members of the United Nations Security Council: China, the United States, and Russia. In 2014, the United States declared that it will abide by the terms of the Treaty, except for landmines used on the Korean Peninsula. South Korea, like North Korea, has not signed the treaty, believing the use of landmines to be crucial to the defense of their territory against the other.

== Responses ==
=== Supportive ===
Pope Francis has described the Ottawa Process as an example of where the organisations of "civil society" are "capable of creating effective dynamics that the United Nations cannot".

=== Critical ===
Criticism from academics, security officials, and diplomats is based on both the political process and the substance. The campaign for what became the Ottawa Treaty was led by a group of powerful non-governmental organizations, and instead of working within existing multilateral frameworks, including the Conference on Disarmament, based at the UN compound in Geneva (the Palais des Nations), an ad hoc framework was created that detoured around existing intergovernmental processes. Critics alleged that this represented a challenge to the sovereignty and responsibility of nation states for the defense of their citizens.

Substantively, critics view the treaty as naive and idealistic, in attempting to erase the reality of security threats that lead armies and defense forces to rely on landmines for protection against invasion and terror attacks. As a result, ratification has been far from universal, and many of the states that do not currently intend to ratify the treaty possess large stockpiles of anti-personnel mines. So far 35 countries have not signed the treaty; nonsignatories include the United States, Russia, China, Myanmar, United Arab Emirates, Cuba, Egypt, India, Israel, and Iran.

Opponents of banning anti-personnel mines give several reasons, among them that mines are a cheap and therefore cost-effective area denial weapon. Opponents say that when used correctly, anti-personnel mines are defensive weapons that harm only attackers, unlike ranged weapons such as ballistic missiles that are most effective if used for preemptive attacks. Furthermore, opponents say that the psychological effect of mines increases the threshold to attack and thus reduces the risk of war.

The Ottawa Treaty does not cover all types of unexploded ordnance. Cluster bombs, for example, introduce the same problem as mines: unexploded bomblets can remain a hazard for civilians long after a conflict has ended. A separate Convention on Cluster Munitions was drafted in 2008 and was adopted and entered into force in 2010. As of February 2022, there are 110 state parties of the CCM. In theory, mines could be replaced by manually triggered Claymore mines, but this requires the posting of a sentry.

Opponents point out that the Ottawa Convention places no restriction whatsoever on anti-vehicle mines which kill civilians on tractors, on school buses, etc. The position of the United States is that the inhumane nature of landmines stems not from whether they are anti-personnel as opposed to anti-vehicle but from their persistence. The United States has unilaterally committed to never using persistent landmines of any kind, whether anti-personnel or anti-vehicle, which they say is a more comprehensive humanitarian measure than the Ottawa Convention. All US landmines now self-destruct in two days or less, in most cases four hours. While the self-destruct mechanism has never failed in more than 65,000 random tests, if self-destruct were to fail the mine will self-deactivate because its battery will run down in two weeks or less. That compares with persistent anti-vehicle mines which remain lethal for about 30 years and are legal under the Ottawa Convention.

=== Compliance ===
Little progress in actual reduction of mine usage has been achieved. In 2011, the number of landmines dispersed had increased since 2004, landmines being dispersed in Libya, Syria, and Myanmar.

Turkey reported that between 1957 and 1998, Turkish forces laid 615,419 antipersonnel mines along the Syrian border "to prevent illegal border crossings". These mines are killing Syrians stuck on the border or trying to cross near Kobanî. Turkey is required under the treaty to destroy all antipersonnel mines, but has missed deadlines. Human Rights Watch claims in its report that as of 18 November 2014, over 2,000 civilians were still in the Tel Shair corridor section of the mine belt because Turkey had been refusing entry for cars or livestock, and the refugees did not want to leave behind their belongings.

During the Russian invasion of Ukraine, Ukraine has become the first party of the treaty to violate it. In the war, Russia has also used landmines forbidden in the treaty, but it has not signed the treaty.

== Withdrawals ==
The Ottawa Treaty's signatories have largely remained consistent until the Russian invasion of Ukraine, wherein several European signatories have withdrawn from the treaty.

=== Poland, Lithuania, Latvia, and Estonia ===
In Estonia, a group of 20 MPs in the Parliament of Estonia from the Conservative People's Party of Estonia, headed by the former Chief of Defence Ants Laaneots presented a bill to withdraw from the Ottawa Treaty on October 2022. This was however met with reluctance by the Estonian Ministry of Defence, whose spokesman Thomas Mell claimed that there's no indication that Estonia would need to reintroduce anti-personnel mines, and the bill was voted down by the parliament. After the United States approved transfers of anti-personnel landmines to Ukraine on 19 November 2024 and the renewed debate in the neighbouring Finland on 23 November 2024, the parliamentary National Defence Committee decided to reconsider the matter.

In December 2024, based on the military lessons from the Russian war against Ukraine, the outgoing Lithuanian Minister of National Defence initiated the debate on the withdrawal from the Ottawa Treaty.

On 18 March 2025, the defence ministers of Poland, Lithuania, Latvia and Estonia jointly announced their intention to leave the Ottawa Treaty. The governments have reasoned that anti-personnel mines are an important capability and that Russia is not a party to the treaty and would not hesitate to use such munitions in a conflict with NATO. Russia has been using such mines extensively during its invasion of Ukraine. Despite their intention to leave the Ottawa Treaty, the defence ministers emphasized their commitment to international humanitarian law.

On 16 April 2025, the Latvian parliament voted to withdraw from the Ottawa Treaty; the Lithuanian parliament voted to withdraw on 8 May 2025; and the Estonian parliament on 4 June 2025. The withdrawal will take effect in six months after the countries notify the United Nations and other treaty members, allowing them to stockpile and use anti-personnel landmines. On 25 June 2025 Polish Sejm voted 413/15/3 in favour of withdrawal from the treaty.

All three Baltic States notified the United Nations of withdrawal from the Ottawa Treaty in June 2025. It formally took effect on 27 December 2025. Poland's withdrawal took effect on 20 February 2026.

=== Finland ===
In Finland, the National Coalition Party and the Finns Party have proposed withdrawing from the treaty in 2014, Finland having entered the treaty just two years prior. The stance was supported by the Finnish Ministry of Defence report from 2003, which saw landmines as an effective weapon against a mechanised invasion force. Although no decisions were made, the political debates and public initiatives to withdraw continued in 2018 and especially in 2022, after the Russian invasion of Ukraine Debate sparked again after the new Finnish Chief of Defence Janne Jaakkola pushed for reconsideration of the policy on anti-personnel landmines on 23 November 2024, based on the new developments in the Russian invasion of Ukraine. Following Jaakkola's appeal, three new citizens' initiatives were started for the withdrawal from the Ottawa Treaty, and the matter quickly started a widespread public discussion with multiple political parties pledging support for withdrawal.

On 1 April 2025, the Finnish government announced its intention to leave the Ottawa Treaty. The Finnish parliament voted to withdraw from the convention on 19 June 2025. The instrument of withdrawal was presented to the United Nations on 10 July 2025 and the withdrawal took effect on 10 January 2026.

=== Ukraine ===
Ukraine signaled in 2014 that it might have to withdraw from the treaty due to military necessity. Ukraine stated that it "remains adherent to its international obligations and is ready to undertake all necessary measures to destroy anti-personnel mines in mined areas under its jurisdiction. However, this could be done only after [Ukraine] will regain control of the territory currently occupied by [Russia]."

Despite Ukraine having not officially withdrawn from the treaty, US president Joe Biden approved transfers of American anti-personnel landmines to Ukraine on 19 November 2024, eliciting criticism for the rejection of the treaty from human rights organisations such as Human Rights Watch and Amnesty International USA.

On 29 June 2025, Ukrainian President Volodymyr Zelenskyy signed a decree enacting the decision of the National Security and Defence Council of Ukraine to withdraw the country from the treaty.

== Review conferences ==
- First Review Conference: 29 November – 3 December 2004, Nairobi, Kenya: Nairobi Summit on a Mine Free World.
- Second Review Conference: 29 November – 4 December 2009, Cartagena, Colombia: Cartagena Summit on a Mine-Free World.
- Third Review Conference: 23–27 June 2014, Maputo, Mozambique: Maputo Review Conference on a Mine-Free World.
- Fourth Review Conference: 25–29 November 2019, Oslo, Norway: Oslo Review Conference on a Mine-Free World

== Annual meetings ==
Annual meetings of the treaty member states are held at different locations around the world. These meetings provide a forum to report on what has been accomplished, indicate where additional work is needed and seek any assistance they may require.

- 1st meeting of the States Parties in May 1999 in Maputo, Mozambique
- 2nd meeting of the States Parties in September 2000 in Geneva, Switzerland
- 3rd meeting of the States Parties in September 2001 in Managua in Managua, Nicaragua
- 4th meeting of the States Parties in September 2002 in Geneva, Switzerland
- 5th meeting of the States Parties in September 2003 in Bangkok, Thailand
- First Review Conference or Nairobi Summit on a Mine-Free World in November/December 2004 in Nairobi, Kenya
- 6th meeting of the States Parties in November/December 2005 in Zagreb, Croatia
- 7th meeting of the States Parties in September 2006 in Geneva, Switzerland
- 8th meeting of the States Parties in September 2007 at the Dead Sea, Jordan
- 9th meeting of the States Parties in November 2008 in Geneva, Switzerland
- Second Review Conference or Cartagena Summit on a Mine-Free World in November/December 2009 in Cartagena, Colombia
- 10th meeting of the States Parties in November/December 2010 in Geneva, Switzerland
- 11th meeting of the States Parties in November/December 2011 in Phnom Penh, Cambodia
- 12th meeting of the States Parties in November/December 2012 in Geneva, Switzerland
- 13th meeting of the States Parties in November/December 2013 in Geneva, Switzerland
- Third Review Conference or Maputo Review Conference on a Mine-Free World in June 2014 in Maputo, Mozambique
- 14th meeting of the States Parties in December 2015 in Geneva, Switzerland
- 15th meeting of the States Parties in November/December 2016 in Santiago, Chile
- 16th meeting of the States Parties in December 2017 in Vienna, Austria
- 17th meeting of the States Parties in November 2018 in Geneva, Switzerland
- Fourth Review Conference or Oslo Review Conference on a Mine-Free World in November 2019 in Oslo, Norway
- 18th meeting of the States Parties in November 2020 in Geneva, Switzerland
- 19th meeting of the States Parties in November 2021 in The Hague, Netherlands
- 20th meeting of the States Parties in November 2022 in Geneva, Switzerland
- 21st meeting of the States Parties in November 2023 in Geneva, Switzerland

== United Nations General Assembly annual resolutions ==
A recurrent opportunity for States to indicate their support for the ban on antipersonnel mines is their vote on the annual UN General Assembly (UNGA) resolution calling for universalization and full implementation of the Mine Ban Treaty. UNGA Resolution 66/29, for example, was adopted on 2 December 2011 by a vote of 162 in favor, none opposed, and 18 abstentions. Of the 19 states not party that voted in support of Resolution 66/29, nine have voted in favor of every Mine Ban Treaty resolution since 1997 (Armenia, Bahrain, Finland, Georgia, Oman, Poland, Singapore, Sri Lanka, and the United Arab Emirates); 10 that consistently abstained or were absent previously now vote in favor (Azerbaijan, China, Kazakhstan, Kyrgyzstan, Lao PDR, Marshall Islands, Micronesia FS, Mongolia, Morocco, and Tonga). Somalia, now a State Party, was absent from the 2011 resolution, but has voted in favor in previous years.

Since the first UNGA resolution supporting the Mine Ban Treaty in 1997, the number of states voting in favor has ranged from a low of 139 in 1999 to a high of 165 in 2010. The number of states abstaining from supporting the resolution has ranged from a high of 23 in 2002 and 2003 to a low of 17 in 2010, 2005 and 2006. The group of states that could be described as most concerned about the security implications of the Mine Ban Treaty are the 15 states not party that have voted against consecutive resolutions since 1997: Cuba, Egypt, India, Iran, Israel, Libya (since 1998), Myanmar, North Korea (since 2007), Pakistan, Russia, South Korea, Syria, Uzbekistan (since 1999), the United States, and Vietnam (since 1998).

== Key figures in the making of the treaty ==
=== Letter-writers and non-governmental organizations ===
The Ottawa Anti-Personnel Mines Treaty would not likely have been possible without the sustained effort of thousands of global citizens writing their elected officials in the lead up to the treaty's creation and signing in 1997. A small number of core groups mobilized on the landmines problem worked closely with a wider variety of NGOs, including churches, prominent children's and women's rights groups, disarmament and development groups, in order to produce concerted political pressure, as well as with the media to keep the issue in the forefront. Because of this unparalleled involvement of the global public, and their success in lobbying for this initiative, university political science and law departments frequently study the socio-historical initiatives that led to the Ottawa process, arguing it is a leading modern example of the power of peaceful democratic expression and a method for mobilization on disarmament issues or more broadly.

=== Jody Williams and The International Campaign to Ban Landmines ===
The organization the International Campaign to Ban Landmines and its founding coordinator, Jody Williams, were instrumental in the passage of the Ottawa Treaty, and for these efforts they jointly received the 1997 Nobel Peace Prize. However, since efforts to secure the treaty started over a decade before Williams involvement and the fact that the treaty was a joint effort of so many people from all over the world, including hundreds of influential political and private leaders, some felt that Williams should decline to personally benefit from the award of the 1997 Nobel Peace Prize. Williams herself has said she feels the organization deserved the award while she did not, and emphasized the collective nature of the movement; as the chair of a group of female Peace Prize recipients, she has used her status as a Peace Prize recipient to bring concerns of woman-led grassroots organizations to the attention of governments.

=== Werner Ehrlich ===
Available sources such as the study on the Ottawa Treaty made by Stuart Maslen and an article published by Werner Ehrlich in 1996 indicate that the key figure in the making of the Ottawa Treaty was the Austrian diplomat Werner Ehrlich, head of the Disarmament Unit at the Austrian Ministry for Foreign Affairs in 1995/96:

He initiated the process by making the first draft of the future Treaty in April 1996 and succeeded to get this project and the proposed unorthodox procedure – to negotiate this Convention outside the Conference on Disarmament (CD) – adopted by the Ottawa Conference in October 1996 – in spite of nearly universal opposition.

It was an uphill struggle. This proposal was understandably rejected by countries which see anti-personnel mines as essential for national defense. Consequently, they tried repeatedly to block the project or to steer it to a dead end in the CD.

The proposal was however also opposed by Countries and NGO's supporting a total ban, because of their conviction that practical measures would be more conducive to a total ban than a Convention, A view which was reflected in the "purpose" of the 1996 Ottawa Conference: "to catalyze practical efforts to move toward a ban and to create partnerships essential to building the necessary political will to achieve a global ban on AP mines." But this meant in fact, that a total ban was postponed to a remote future: until practical efforts may have convinced one day Countries depending on APMs for their defense, that APMs are useless or counterproductive.

The approach of Werner Ehrlich was different:

It was essential to delegitimize as soon as possible any use of APMs by the adoption of an instrument of international law on a total ban of APMs, because it would not only bind the Parties to the convention but would also have at least a moral effect on Countries not Parties by clearly contradicting the idea that the use of APMs is legal.

It was also essential to elaborate this Treaty in a free standing negotiating process outside the Conference on Disarmament (CD), as there mine-affected Countries not Members of the CD would be excluded and opponents of a total ban could block the project immediately, e. g. simply by denying consensus to put it on the agenda.

At the Ottawa Conference in October 1996 Ehrlich defended the project of a Total Ban Convention, against opponents of a total ban as well as even against leading humanitarian organizations such as the International Committee of the Red Cross (ICRC) and the International Campaign to Ban Landmines (ICBL), which at the beginning saw the project as premature, as detraction or even as a waste of time. He succeeded finally against all odds – due in particular to the inspired and timely support of the Canadian Minister of Foreign Affairs, Lloyd Axworthy – to get his project indorsed by the Conference: Austria was tasked to draft the text for the negotiations which were to be held – as proposed – in a free standing negotiating process, a procedure later called the "Ottawa Process".

His third and final draft before leaving disarmament at the end of 1996 to become Austria's Ambassador to the Islamic Republic of Iran was known as the "First Austrian Draft" and served as the basis for the following negotiations leading to the adoption of the Mine Ban Treaty in December 1997

=== Canada's Mine Action ===
Mines Action Canada grew out of the efforts of Canadian non-governmental agencies concerned about the rapidly spreading impact of landmines and cluster munitions. The group was successful in garnering positive Canadian government attention to the call for a ban by mobilizing Canadians to demand action. By 1996, sustained and growing citizen action led Minister Axworthy of the Canadian Department of Foreign Affairs and International Trade to collaborate with Mines Action Canada and the International Campaign to Ban Landmines. This in turn led to the Government of Canada challenging other countries to negotiate and sign a treaty banning ban landmines within one year. This call to action led directly to the signing of the "Convention on the Prohibition on the Use, Stockpiling, Production and Transfer of Anti-Personnel Mines and on their Destruction" commonly known as the 'mine ban treaty' one year later in December 1997. Mines Action Canada was hosted by Physicians for Global Survival, chaired by Valerie Warmington and coordinated by Celina Tuttle from the coalition's inception until after the treaty was signed.

=== Diana, Princess of Wales ===
Once in the final stages leading into the treaty, the Ottawa Treaty was ardently championed by Diana, Princess of Wales. In January 1997, she visited Angola and walked near a minefield to dramatize its dangers. In January 1997, Angola's population was approximately 10 million and had about 10–20 million land mines in place from its civil war. In August 1997, she visited Bosnia with the Landmine Survivors Network. Her work with landmines focused on the injuries and deaths inflicted on children. Her death a few weeks later propelled the cause on the world stage and, as reported by Time magazine in their September 1997 edition, "After her death, the treaty... took on the luster of a humanitarian memorial to Diana and her cause." When the Second Reading of the Landmines Bill took place in 1998 in the British House of Commons, Foreign Secretary Robin Cook praised Diana and paid tribute to her work on landmines.

=== Lloyd Axworthy ===
In his Canadian Foreign Affairs portfolio (1996–2000), Lloyd Axworthy became internationally known (and criticized in some quarters) for his advancement of the concept of human security and including the Ottawa Treaty, and the creation of the International Criminal Court.

=== Bobby Muller ===
Robert O. (Bobby) Muller (born 1946) is an American peace advocate. He participated in the Vietnam War as a young soldier, and after returning from Vietnam, Muller began to work for veterans' rights and became a peace activist. Since then, Muller founded Vietnam Veterans of America (VVA) in 1978 and Vietnam Veterans of America Foundation (VVAF) in 1980. The VVAF co-founded the International Campaign to Ban Landmines, which won a 1997 Nobel Peace Prize.

== See also ==
- Geneva Call, an NGO that engages non-state actors to ban landmines
- Geneva International Centre for Humanitarian Demining, host for the secretariat (ISU) of the Ottawa Treaty
- Mine action
- Convention on Cluster Munitions, a similar treaty banning cluster munitions
- Protocol on Mines, Booby-Traps and Other Devices
