= Humanity & Inclusion =

Non-governmental organization

- Formation: 1982
- Founder: Jean-Baptiste Richardier Claude Simonnot Yves Gaumeton
- Founded at: France, Lyon
- Type: International non-governmental organization
- Location(s): Lyon, France; Brussels, Belgium; Geneva, Switzerland; Montreal, Canada; London, United Kingdom; Munich, Germany; Takoma Park, United States; Luxembourg City, Luxembourg
- Region served: 61 countries
- Official language: French
- Employees: 3,500 (field staff)
- Website: hi.org

Humanity & Inclusion (formerly Handicap International (Note: On January 24th 2018, the global Handicap International network changed its name and became Humanity & Inclusion. This was done "to communicate more effectively on the diversity of its activities, which are not confined to supporting people with disabilities." In addition to the expanded scope of the organization's activities, the term "handicap" had been rejected by the people it was applied to because it had been imposed on them by social workers. See Nelson, Jack Adolph (1994). The Disabled, the Media, and the Information Age. Greenwood. p. 28. ISBN 9780313284724. "in keeping with the disability rights movement analysis of the situation—that the individual is okay but society has put him or her at a disadvantage—the term was nonetheless rejected when disabled people began wrestling the power of the programs that controlled their lives from social workers and began to run their own programs…if for no other reason that it was a term imposed on them by agencies." For a discussion of the history of the term, see Amundson, Ron (n.d.). "About the Meaning of "Handicap"". hilo.hawaii.edu. Archived from the original on April 29, 2019.)) is an international non-governmental organization. It was founded in 1982 to provide help in refugee camps in Cambodia and Thailand. Headquartered in France and Belgium, since its creation, it has opened branches in six other countries: Switzerland, Luxembourg, United Kingdom, Germany, Canada and the United States.

It is an organization which aims to help disabled and vulnerable people in situations of poverty and exclusion, conflict and disaster. More than 3,500 field staff are currently located in more than 60 countries worldwide.

== History ==
The organization was founded in France by two French doctors in 1982 to help people affected by landmines in Cambodian refugee camps. The first orthopedic centers were set up in refugee camps in Thailand, Cambodia, Burma and Laos. Simple, locally available equipment was used to provide immediate, effective and practical aid, and local teams carried out the work. In 1986, Handicap International Belgium was set up, and the organization began to extend its work to other countries.

It is one of the 6 founding members of the International Campaign to Ban Landmines which received the Nobel Peace Prize in 1997. Since February 2005, the organization has also been calling for a ban on cluster munitions and conducting research documenting the human impact of these weapons. Humanity & Inclusion is a founding member of the Cluster Munition Coalition, an international civil society campaign that works to erase the production and storage of all the munition. In February 2006, Belgium became the first country to enact such a ban as a result of Handicap International's public awareness and advocacy efforts. Handicap International has been a vocal advocate of the Convention on Cluster Munitions (CCM), an international treaty banning the use, transfer and stockpile of these weapons adopted on 30 May 2008 in Dublin, Ireland. There are currently 68 states that have ratified the CCM and 43 non-ratifying signatories.

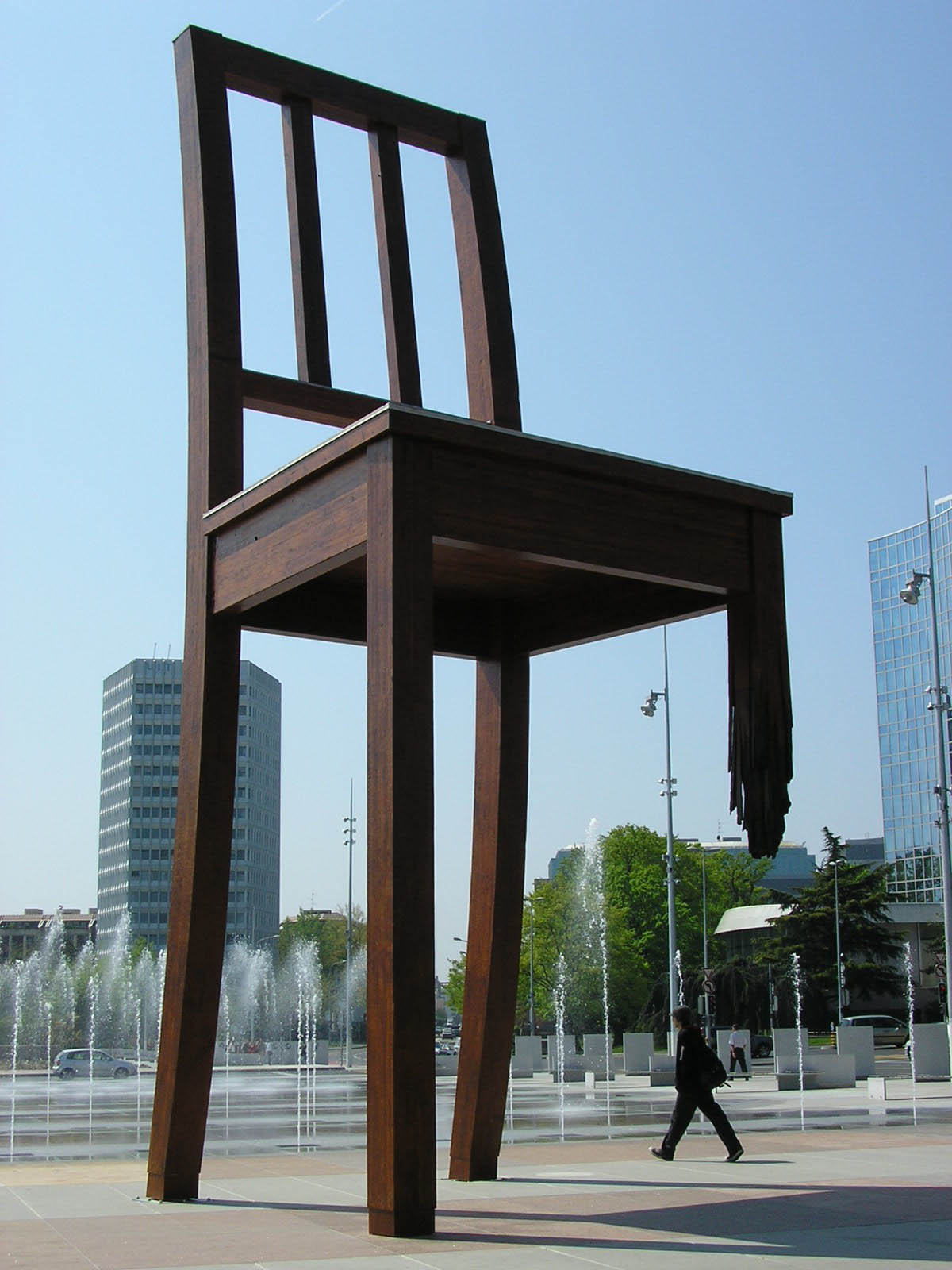
Broken Chair on the Place des Nations, Geneva

Humanity & Inclusion won the prize of the 2011 Conrad N. Hilton Humanitarian Prize, a $1.5 million prize, for its commitment to disabled people living in situations of poverty, exclusion, conflict or natural disasters. It is also a member organization of the International Disability and Development Consortium.

The Brazilian football player Neymar Jr. became an "ambassador" of Humanity & Inclusion on 15 August 2017 until April 2019.

The organization was ranked the 8th best international NGO in the world in the NGO Advisor 2017 rankings.

The organization changed its name to Humanity & Inclusion in January 2018 to better communicate "the diversity of its activities, which are not confined to supporting people with disabilities." This new identity, change of name and logo, was led by Cossette, a marketing agency in Canada. With this new name, Cossette launched the campaign "Be a lifeline" which was directed by Olivier Staub, Canadian filmmaker and photographer. This campaign won a bronze lion at Cannes Lions International Festival of Creativity in the design category in 2018.

In 2020, the European Union Horizon Prize honored Humanity & Inclusion with two awards for its Odyssey2025 project on the use of drones in mine clearance operations and its TeleRehabilitation For All project. The €1 million humanitarian prize helped HI establish a new fund to fuel future advances in innovation and technology.

== List of "ambassadors" ==
- Ross Wilson – table tennis Paralympian
- Jack Hunter-Spivey – table tennis Paralympian
- Eddie Ndopu – disability rights advocate

== See also ==
- List of disability rights organizations
