= Honduras mahogany =

Honduras mahogany is a common name for several trees and may refer to:

- Swietenia humilis, a small tree with a restricted range from southern Mexico to northern Central America
- Swietenia macrophylla, a large tree with a broad native range from Central America to South America, and cultivated in Asia for timber production.
