= International Campaign to Ban Landmines =

International organization

- Abbreviation: ICBL
- Formation: October 1992; 34 years ago
- Founder: Jody Williams
- Founded at: New York, United States
- Type: NGO
- Legal status: Nonprofit
- Purpose: Working for a world free of antipersonnel landmines and cluster munitions
- Headquarters: Geneva, Switzerland
- Coordinates: 46.22°N 6.14°E
- Region served: Worldwide
- Methods: Public awareness, publications and advocating at national, regional and international levels
- Fields: Disarmament of anti-personnel mines
- Website: www.icbl.org

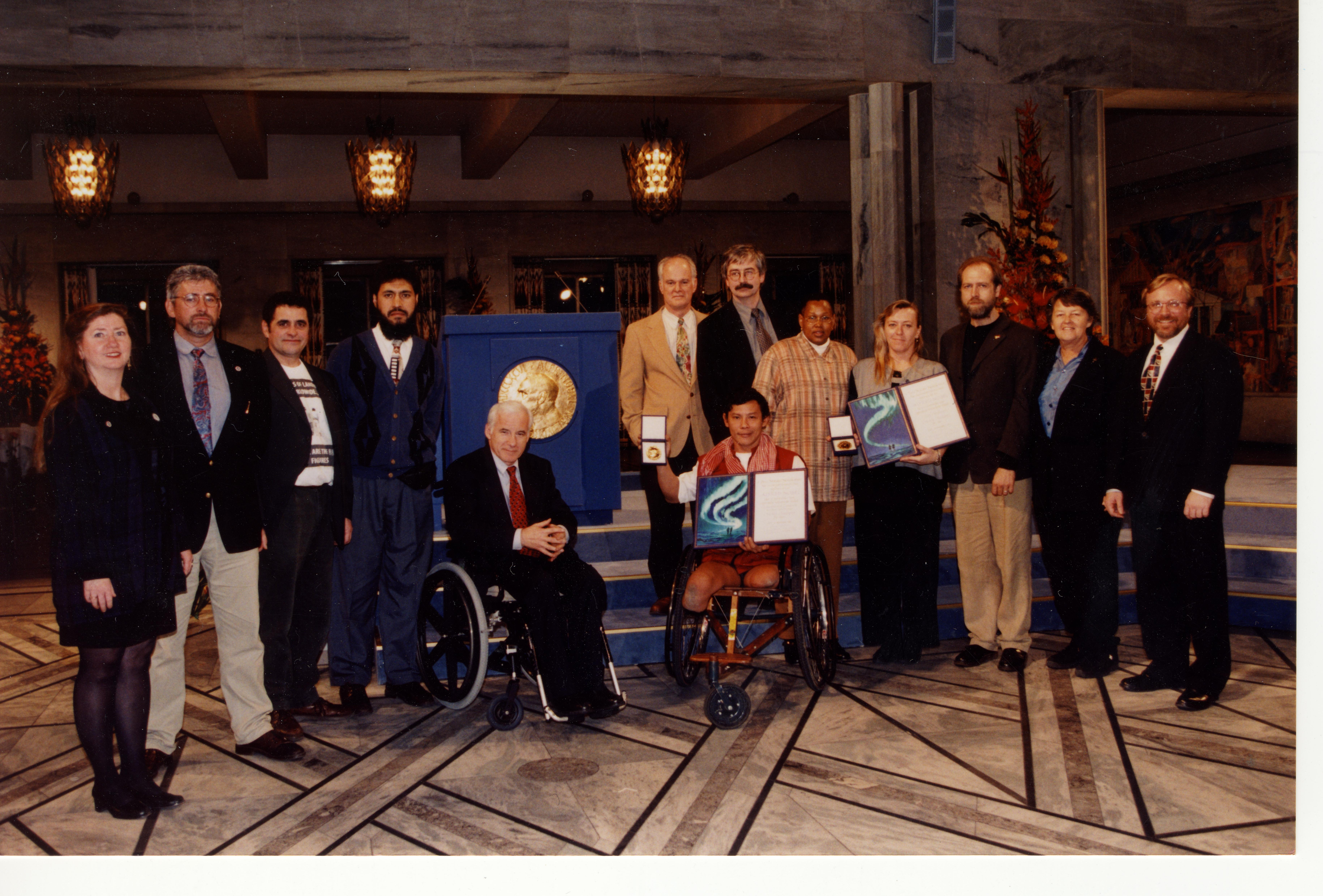
The Campaign receiving the 1997 Nobel Peace Prize

The International Campaign to Ban Landmines (ICBL) is a coalition of non-governmental organizations whose objective is to prohibit the use and proliferation of anti-personnel mines and cluster munitions.

The coalition was formed in 1992 when six organisations with similar interests (France-based Handicap International, Germany-based Medico International, UK-based Mines Advisory Group, and US-based Human Rights Watch, Physicians for Human Rights and Vietnam Veterans of America Foundation) agreed to cooperate on their common goal. The campaign has since grown and spread to become a network with active members in some 100 countries—including groups working on women, children, veterans, religious groups, the environment, human rights, arms control, peace and development—working locally, nationally and internationally to eradicate antipersonnel landmines. A prominent supporter was Diana, Princess of Wales.

The organization and its founding coordinator, Jody Williams, jointly received the 1997 Nobel Peace Prize for their efforts to bring about the Mine Ban Treaty (Ottawa Treaty). The signature of this treaty (which bans the use, production, stockpiling, and transfer of anti-personnel mines) is seen as the campaign's greatest success. The prize was received on the organisation's behalf by its co-founder, Rae McGrath of the Mines Advisory Group and by Tunn Channareth, a Cambodian mine victim and ICBL activist.

The ICBL monitors the global mine and cluster munition situation (through Landmine and Cluster Munition Monitor, its research and monitoring arm), and conducts advocacy activities, lobbying for implementation and universalization of the Mine Ban Treaty, humanitarian mine action programs geared toward the needs of mine-affected communities, support for landmine survivors, their families and their communities, and a stop to the production, use and transfer of landmines, including by non-State armed groups. The ICBL participates in the periodical meetings of the Mine Ban Treaty process, urges states not parties to the treaty to join and non-state armed groups to respect the mine ban norm, condemns mine use and promotes public awareness and debate on the mine issue, organizing events and generating media attention.

== Organizational structure ==
In 2011, the International Campaign to Ban Landmines (ICBL) and Cluster Munition Coalition (CMC) merged into one unified structure, now known as the ICBL-CMC, in order to realize operational efficiencies and reinforce complementary work. The ICBL and the CMC campaigns remain separate and continue to remind governments of their commitments to implement and promote both treaties. Landmine and Cluster Munition Monitor continues its unique civil society monitoring program on the humanitarian and developmental consequences of landmines, cluster munitions, and explosive remnants of war.

The activities of the ICBL-CMC are supported by a Governance Board representative of various elements of the ICBL that provides strategic, financial and human resources oversight. An Advisory Committee provides more regular input to staff and the working of the campaign. Four ambassadors serve as campaign representatives at speaking events and other conferences worldwide. They include Jody Williams, Tun Channareth (Cambodian landmine survivor), Song Kosal (Cambodian landmine survivor), and Margaret Arech Orech (Ugandan landmine survivor and founder of Ugandan Landmine Survivors Association). Currently, the ICBL has 14 staff members based in Geneva (the central office), Lyon, Paris, and Ottawa. Additionally, the ICBL-CMC hosts several interns each year.

== Mine Ban Treaty ==
The Mine Ban Treaty, or the Ottawa Treaty, is the international agreement that bans anti-personnel mines. Officially entitled The Convention on the Prohibition, Use, Stockpiling, Production and Transfer of Antipersonnel Mines and on Their Destruction, the treaty is sometimes referred to as the Ottawa Convention. The Mine Ban Treaty was adopted in Oslo, Norway, in September 1997 and signed by 122 States in Ottawa, Canada, on 3 December 1997. As of March 2018, there were 164 States Parties to the Ottawa Treaty.

The mine ban treaty suggest several agendas to member states:

1. Never use antipersonnel mines, nor to "develop, produce, otherwise acquire, stockpile, retain or transfer" them
2. Destroy mines in their stockpiles within four years
3. Clear mined areas in their territory within 10 years
4. In mine-affected countries, conduct mine risk education and ensure that mine survivors, their families and communities receive comprehensive assistance
5. Offer assistance to other States Parties, for example in providing for survivors or contributing to clearance programs
6. Adopt national implementation measures (such as national legislation) in order to ensure that the terms of the treaty are upheld in their territory

== Landmine and Cluster Munition Monitor ==
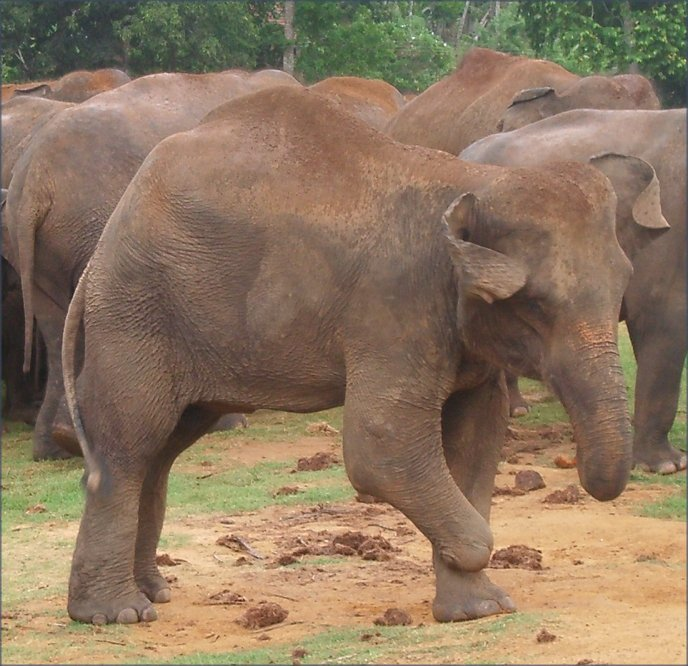
A Sri Lankan elephant injured by a land mine

Landmine and Cluster Munition Monitor is the ICBL-CMC's research and monitoring arm. It is the de facto monitoring regime for the Mine Ban Treaty and the Convention on Cluster Munitions of 2008. It monitors and reports on States Parties' implementation of and compliance with the Mine Ban Treaty and the Convention on Cluster Munitions, and more generally, it assesses the problems caused by landmines, cluster munitions, and other explosive remnants of war (ERW). The Monitor represents the first time that NGOs have come together in a coordinated, systematic, and sustained way to monitor humanitarian law or disarmament treaties, and to regularly document progress and problems, thereby successfully putting into practice the concept of civil society-based verification. Since its creation in 1998, Monitor research has been carried out by a global network of primarily in-country researchers, most of them ICBL-CMC campaigners, and all content undergoes rigorous editing by the Monitor's Editorial Team prior to publication.

== See also ==
- Mines Advisory Group
- Geneva Call, an NGO inspired by the ICBL that focuses on non-state actors
- Swiss Foundation for Mine Action
- Mine clearance agencies
- Demining
- Land mine
- Anti-personnel mine
- Aki Ra, an anti-mining activist
- Ban Advocates Voice from communities affected by cluster munitions
- Manitoba Campaign to Ban Landmines
- International Coalition to Ban Uranium Weapons
