= Convention on Cluster Munitions =

International treaty

- Signatories to the convention (blue) and states parties (purple)
- Type: Disarmament
- Drafted: 19–30 May 2008 in Dublin
- Signed: 3 December 2008
- Location: Oslo, Norway
- Effective: 1 August 2010
- Condition: 6 months after 30 ratifications
- Signatories: 108
- Parties: 112
- Depositary: UN Secretary-General
- Languages: Arabic, Chinese, English, French, Russian, and Spanish

Full text
- Convention on Cluster Munitions at Wikisource

The Convention on Cluster Munitions (CCM) is an international treaty that prohibits all use, transfer, production, and stockpiling of cluster munitions, a type of explosive weapon which scatters submunitions ("bomblets") over an area. Additionally, the convention establishes a framework to support victim assistance, clearance of contaminated sites, risk reduction education, and stockpile destruction. The convention was adopted on 30 May 2008 in Dublin, and was opened for signature on 3 December 2008 in Oslo. It entered into force on 1 August 2010, six months after it was ratified by 30 states. As of September 2024, a total of 124 states are committed to the goal of the convention, with 112 states that have ratified it, and 12 states that have signed the convention but not yet ratified it.^{a}

Countries that ratify the convention are obliged "never under any circumstances to":

1. Use cluster munitions;
2. Develop, produce, otherwise acquire, stockpile, retain or transfer to anyone, directly or indirectly, cluster munitions;
3. Assist, encourage or induce anyone to engage in any activity prohibited to a State Party under this Convention.

The treaty allows certain types of weapons with submunitions that do not have the indiscriminate area effects or pose the same unexploded ordnance risks as cluster munitions. Permitted weapons must contain fewer than ten submunitions, and each must weigh more than 4 kilograms (8.8 lb), and each submunition must have the capability to detect and engage a single target object and contain electronic self-destruct and self-deactivation mechanisms. Weapons containing submunitions which all individually weigh at least 20 kg (44 lb) are also excluded. A limited number of prohibited weapons and submunitions can be acquired and kept for training in, and development of, detection, clearance and destruction techniques and counter-measures. Australia, which supports the treaty, also states that the convention does not prohibit the SMArt 155 artillery shell that it has bought, which releases two self-guided self-destructing submunitions.

== History ==
The impetus for the treaty, like that of the 1997 Ottawa Treaty to limit landmines, has been concern over the severe damage and risks to civilians from explosive weapons during and long after attacks. A varying proportion of submunitions dispersed by cluster bombs fail to explode on impact and can lie unexploded for years until disturbed. The sometimes brightly-colored munitions are not camouflaged, but have been compared to toys or Easter eggs, attracting children at play. Human rights activists claim that one in four casualties resulting from submunitions that fail to explode on impact are children, who often pick up and play with the explosive canisters well after the conflict has ended. The 2006 Lebanon War provided momentum for the campaign to ban cluster bombs. The United Nations estimated that up to 40% of Israeli cluster bomblets failed to explode on impact. Norway organized the independent Oslo Process after discussions at the traditional disarmament forum in Geneva fell through in November 2006.

The cluster munitions ban process, also known as the Oslo Process, began in February 2007 in Oslo. At this time, 46 nations issued the "Oslo Declaration", committing themselves to:

Conclude by 2008 a legally binding international instrument that prohibits the use and stockpiling of cluster munitions that cause unacceptable harm to civilians and secure adequate provision of care and rehabilitation to survivors and clearance of contaminated areas.

The Oslo Process held meetings in Lima in May 2007 and Vienna in December 2007. In February 2008, 79 countries adopted the "Wellington Declaration", setting forth the principles to be included in the convention.

=== Adoption ===
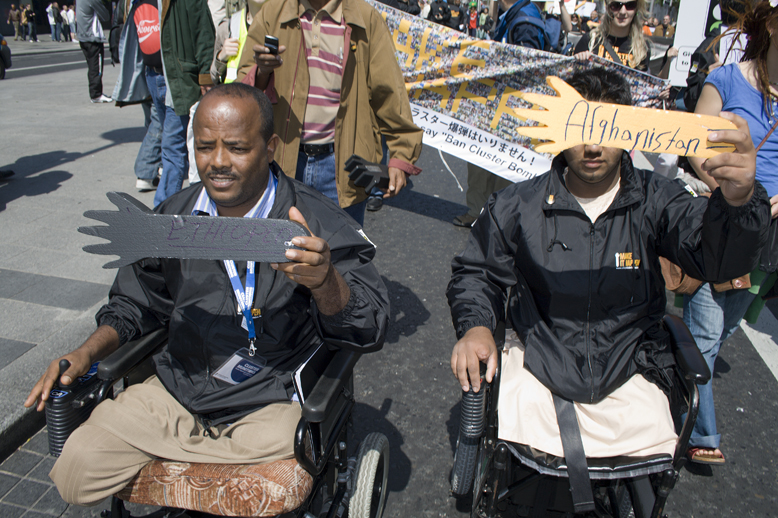
Ban Advocates from Afghanistan and Ethiopia demonstrating during the May 2008 Dublin conference

Delegates from 107 nations agreed to the final draft of the treaty at the end of a ten-day meeting held in May 2008 in Dublin, Ireland. Its text was formally adopted on 30 May 2008 by 107 nations, including 7 of the 14 countries that have used cluster bombs and 17 of the 34 countries that have produced them.

The treaty was opposed by a number of countries that produce or stockpile significant quantities of cluster munitions, including China, Russia, the United States, India, Israel, Pakistan and Brazil. The US has acknowledged humanitarian concerns about the use of cluster munitions, but insisted that the proper venue for a discussion of cluster munitions was the forum attached to the Convention on Certain Conventional Weapons, which includes all major military powers. The US has further stated that the development and introduction of "smart" cluster munitions, where each submunition contains its own targeting and guidance system as well as an auto-self-destruct mechanism, means that the problematic munitions are being moved away from, in any case. In 2006, Barack Obama voted to support a legislative measure to limit use of the bombs, while his general election opponent John McCain and his primary opponent Hillary Clinton both voted against it. In 2008, the Pentagon pledged not to use any cluster munitions with a failure rate higher than 1 percent after 2018. However, the US did not impose an outright ban.

In response to US lobbying, and also concerns raised by diplomats from Australia, Canada, Japan, the United Kingdom and others, the treaty includes a provision allowing signatory nations to cooperate militarily with non-signatory nations. This provision is designed to provide legal protections to the military personnel of signatory nations engaged in military operations with the US or other non-signatory nations that might use cluster munitions. British government officials, including foreign secretary David Miliband, approved a policy which allows the US to keep the munitions in British territory.

Prior to the Dublin meeting, the UK was thought to be one of a group of nations in a pivotal role, whereby their cooperation could make or break the treaty. In an unexpected turn of events shortly before the end of the conference, Prime Minister Gordon Brown declared that the UK would withdraw all of its cluster bombs from service. This was done despite intense behind-the-scenes lobbying by the US and objections by British government personnel who saw utility in the weapons.

The CCM was opened for signature at a ceremony at Oslo City Hall on 3–4 December 2008. By the end of the ceremony, 94 states had signed the treaty, including four (Ireland, the Holy See, Sierra Leone and Norway) which had also submitted their instruments of ratification. Signatories included 21 of the 27 member-states of the European Union and 18 of the 26 countries in NATO. Among the signatories were several states affected by cluster munitions, including Laos and Lebanon.

In November 2008, ahead of the signing conference in Oslo, the European Parliament passed a resolution calling on all European Union governments to sign and ratify the convention, as several EU countries had not yet declared their intention to do so. Finland had declared it would not sign, having just signed the Ottawa Treaty and replaced its mine arsenal largely with cluster munitions.

=== Entry into force ===
According to article 17 of the treaty, the convention entered into force "on the first day of the sixth month after the month in which the thirtieth instrument of ratification, acceptance, approval or accession has been deposited". Since the thirtieth ratification was deposited during February 2010, the convention entered into force on 1 August 2010; by that point, 38 nations had ratified the treaty.

As the convention entered into force, UN Secretary-General Ban Ki-moon spoke of "not only the world's collective revulsion at these abhorrent weapons, but also the power of collaboration among governments, civil society and the United Nations to change attitudes and policies on a threat faced by all humankind". A spokesman for the International Committee of the Red Cross said "These weapons are a relic of the Cold War. They are a legacy that has to be eliminated because they increasingly won't work." Nobel Peace Prize winner Jody Williams called the convention "the most important disarmament and humanitarian convention in over a decade".

Anti-cluster munitions campaigners praised the rapid progress made in the adoption of the convention, and expressed hope that even non-signatories – such as China, North Korea, Russia, and the US – would be discouraged from using the weapons by the entry into force of the convention. As one of the countries that did not ratify the treaty, the United States said that cluster bombs are a legal form of weapon, and that they had a "clear military utility in combat." It also said that compared to other types of weapons, cluster bombs are less harmful to civilians.

Article 11 required the first meeting of states parties to be held within 12 months of the entry into force. The first such meeting was held in Laos in November 2010. There is a president, currently Swiss ambassador Félix Baumann.

According to Cluster Munition Monitor 2022, the list of 16 countries that refuse to sign the convention and who produce cluster munitions included Brazil, China, Egypt, Greece, India, Iran, Israel, North Korea, Pakistan, Poland, Romania, Russia, Singapore, South Korea, Turkey and the United States.

=== Withdrawals ===
On 18 July 2024, the Parliament of Lithuania decided to withdraw from the convention. The Lithuanian government argued that Russia has used cluster munitions extensively during the Russian invasion of Ukraine and would not hesitate to use them in conflict with NATO. The government also pointed out that of the NATO states bordering Russia, only Lithuania and Norway were parties to the convention. Lithuania deposited its instrument of withdrawal from the convention on 6 September 2024, and the withdrawal took effect on 6 March 2025.

== State or group parties ==
Signatories to the convention (blue) and states parties (purple)

As of September 2024, there were 112 states or groups parties to the convention.

State or group party	Signed	Ratified or acceded	Entered into force
Afghanistan	3 December 2008	9 September 2011	1 March 2012
Albania	3 December 2008	16 June 2009	1 August 2010
Andorra		9 April 2013	1 October 2013
Antigua and Barbuda	16 July 2010	23 August 2010	1 February 2011
Australia	3 December 2008	8 October 2012	1 April 2013
Austria	3 December 2008	2 April 2009	1 August 2010
Belgium	3 December 2008	22 December 2009	1 August 2010
Belize		2 September 2014	2 September 2014 (Note: Pending formal entry into force, the state provisionally applied the convention as of this date)
Benin	3 December 2008	10 July 2017	1 January 2018
Bolivia	3 December 2008	30 April 2013	1 October 2013
Bosnia and Herzegovina	3 December 2008	7 September 2010	1 March 2011
Botswana	3 December 2008	27 June 2011	1 December 2011
Bulgaria	3 December 2008	6 April 2011	1 October 2011
Burkina Faso	3 December 2008	16 February 2010	1 August 2010
Burundi	3 December 2008	25 September 2009	1 August 2010
Cabo Verde	3 December 2008	19 October 2010	1 April 2011
Cameroon	15 December 2009	12 July 2012	1 January 2013
Canada	3 December 2008	16 March 2015	1 September 2015
Chad	3 December 2008	26 March 2013	1 September 2013
Chile	3 December 2008	16 December 2010	1 June 2011
Colombia	3 December 2008	10 September 2015	1 March 2016
Comoros	3 December 2008	28 July 2010	1 January 2011
Republic of the Congo	3 December 2008	2 September 2014	1 March 2015
Cook Islands	3 December 2008	23 August 2011	1 February 2012
Costa Rica	3 December 2008	28 April 2011	1 October 2011
Côte d'Ivoire	4 December 2008	12 March 2012	1 September 2012
Croatia	3 December 2008	17 August 2009	1 August 2010
Cuba		6 April 2016	1 October 2016
Czech Republic	3 December 2008	22 September 2011	1 March 2012
Denmark (Note: The convention does not apply to the Faroe Islands)	3 December 2008	2 February 2010	1 August 2010
Dominican Republic	10 November 2009	20 December 2011	1 June 2012
Ecuador	3 December 2008	11 May 2010	1 November 2010
El Salvador	3 December 2008	10 January 2011	1 July 2011
Eswatini		16 September 2011	1 March 2012
Fiji	3 December 2008	28 May 2010	1 November 2010
France	3 December 2008	25 September 2009	1 August 2010
Gambia	3 December 2008	11 December 2018	1 June 2019
Germany	3 December 2008	8 July 2009	1 August 2010
Ghana	3 December 2008	3 February 2011	1 August 2011
Grenada		29 June 2011	1 December 2011
Guatemala	3 December 2008	3 November 2010	1 May 2011
Guinea	3 December 2008	21 October 2014	1 April 2015
Guinea-Bissau	4 December 2008	29 November 2010	1 May 2011
Guyana		31 October 2014	1 April 2015
Holy See	3 December 2008	3 December 2008	1 August 2010
Honduras	3 December 2008	21 March 2012	1 September 2012
Hungary	3 December 2008	3 July 2012	1 January 2013
Iceland	12 November 2009	31 August 2015	1 February 2016
Iraq	12 November 2009	14 May 2013	1 November 2013
Ireland	3 December 2008	3 December 2008	1 August 2010
Italy	3 December 2008	21 September 2011	1 March 2012
Japan	3 December 2008	14 July 2009	1 August 2010
Laos	3 December 2008	18 March 2009	1 August 2010
Lebanon	3 December 2008	5 November 2010	1 May 2011
Lesotho	3 December 2008	28 May 2010	1 November 2010
Liechtenstein	3 December 2008	4 March 2013	1 September 2013
Luxembourg	3 December 2008	10 July 2009	1 August 2010
North Macedonia	3 December 2008	8 October 2009	1 August 2010
Madagascar	3 December 2008	20 May 2017	1 November 2017
Malawi	3 December 2008	7 October 2009	1 August 2010
Maldives		27 September 2019	1 March 2020
Mali	3 December 2008	30 January 2010	1 August 2010
Malta	3 December 2008	24 September 2009	1 August 2010
Mauritania	19 April 2010	1 February 2012	1 August 2012
Mauritius		1 October 2015	1 April 2016
Mexico	3 December 2008	6 May 2009	1 August 2010
Moldova	3 December 2008	16 February 2010	1 August 2010
Monaco	3 December 2008	21 September 2010	1 March 2011
Montenegro	3 December 2008	25 January 2010	1 August 2010
Mozambique	3 December 2008	14 March 2011	1 September 2011
Namibia	3 December 2008	31 August 2018	1 February 2019
Nauru	3 December 2008	4 February 2013	1 August 2013
Netherlands (Note: The convention does not apply to Aruba or Sint Maarten)	3 December 2008	23 February 2011	1 August 2011
New Zealand (Note: The convention does not apply to Tokelau)	3 December 2008	22 December 2009	1 August 2010
Nicaragua	3 December 2008	2 November 2009	1 August 2010
Nigeria	12 June 2009	28 February 2023	1 August 2023
Niue		6 August 2020	1 February 2021
Niger	3 December 2008	2 June 2009	1 August 2010
Norway	3 December 2008	3 December 2008	3 December 2008
Palau	3 December 2008	19 April 2016	1 October 2016
State of Palestine		2 January 2015	1 July 2015
Panama	3 December 2008	29 November 2010	1 May 2011
Paraguay	3 December 2008	12 March 2015	1 September 2015
Peru	3 December 2008	26 September 2012	1 March 2013
Philippines	3 December 2008	3 January 2019	3 July 2019
Portugal	3 December 2008	9 March 2011	1 September 2011
Rwanda	3 December 2008	25 August 2015	1 February 2016
Saint Kitts and Nevis		13 September 2013	1 March 2014
Saint Lucia		15 September 2020	1 March 2021
Saint Vincent and the Grenadines	23 September 2009	29 October 2010	1 April 2011
Samoa	3 December 2008	28 April 2010	1 October 2010
San Marino	3 December 2008	10 July 2009	1 August 2010
Sao Tome and Principe	3 December 2008	27 January 2020	1 July 2020
Senegal	3 December 2008	3 August 2011	1 February 2012
Seychelles	13 April 2010	20 May 2010	1 November 2010
Sierra Leone	3 December 2008	3 December 2008	1 August 2010
Slovakia		24 July 2015	1 January 2016
Slovenia	3 December 2008	19 August 2009	1 August 2010
Somalia	3 December 2008	30 September 2015	1 March 2016
South Africa	3 December 2008	28 May 2015	1 November 2015
South Sudan		3 August 2023	3 August 2023
Spain	3 December 2008	17 June 2009	1 August 2010
Sri Lanka		1 March 2018	1 September 2018
Sweden	3 December 2008	23 April 2012	1 October 2012
Switzerland	3 December 2008	17 July 2012	17 July 2012
Togo	3 December 2008	22 June 2012	1 December 2012
Trinidad and Tobago		21 September 2011	1 March 2012
Tunisia	12 January 2009	28 September 2010	1 March 2011
United Kingdom	3 December 2008	4 May 2010	1 November 2010
Uruguay	3 December 2008	24 September 2009	1 August 2010
Vanuatu		5 September 2025	1 March 2026
Zambia	3 December 2008	12 August 2009	1 August 2010

Another 12 states have signed, but not ratified the convention.

State	Signed
Angola	3 December 2008
Central African Republic	3 December 2008
Cyprus	23 September 2009
Democratic Republic of the Congo	18 March 2009
Djibouti	30 July 2010
Haiti	28 October 2009
Indonesia	3 December 2008
Jamaica	12 June 2009
Kenya	3 December 2008
Liberia	3 December 2008
Tanzania	3 December 2008
Uganda	3 December 2008

One state has withdrawn from the convention:

State party	Signed	Ratified or acceded	Entered into force	Withdrawal deposited	Withdrawal in effect
Lithuania	3 December 2008	24 March 2011	24 March 2011	6 September 2024	6 March 2025

== See also ==
- Arms control
- Convention on Certain Conventional Weapons
- Handicap International
- Human Rights Watch
- Mines Advisory Group
- Ottawa Treaty

== Notes ==
^a The French title is "fr:Convention sur les armes à sous-munitions".
