= Jody Williams =

American political activist (born 1950)

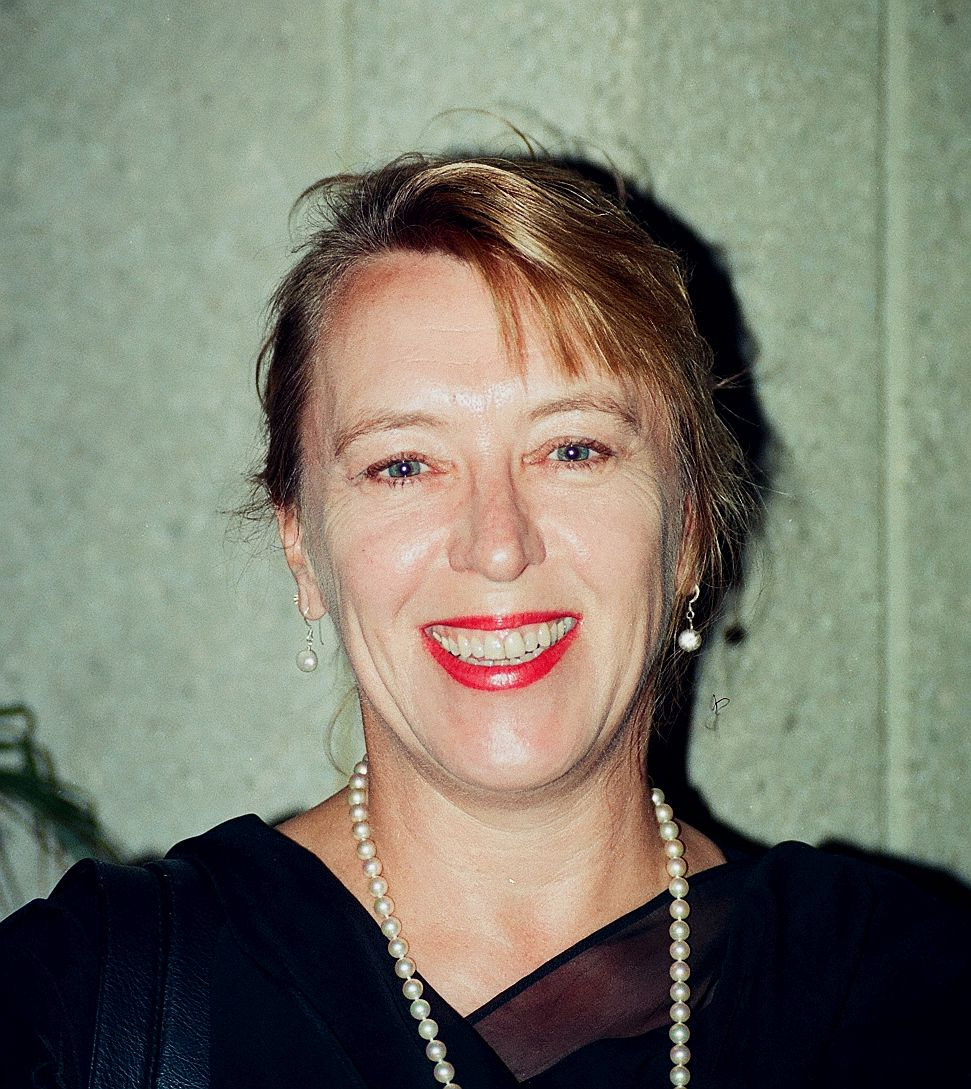
- Williams in 2001
- Born: October 9, 1950 (age 76); Rutland, Vermont, United States
- Education: University of Vermont; School for International Training; Johns Hopkins University
- Known for: 1997 Nobel Peace Prize

Jody Williams (born October 9, 1950) is an American political activist known for her work in banning anti-personnel landmines, her defense of human rights (especially those of women), and her efforts to promote new understandings of security in today's world. She was awarded the Nobel Peace Prize in 1997 for her work toward the banning and clearing of anti-personnel mines.

== Education ==
Williams earned a Master in International Relations from the Paul H. Nitze School of Advanced International Studies (a division of Johns Hopkins University) in Washington, D.C. (1984), an MA in teaching Spanish and English as a second language from the School for International Training (SIT) in Brattleboro, Vermont (1976), and a BA from the University of Vermont (1972).

== Advocacy ==
Williams served as the founding coordinator of the International Campaign to Ban Landmines (ICBL) from early 1992 until February 1998. Before that work, she spent eleven years on various projects related to the wars in Nicaragua and El Salvador, where, according to the Encyclopedia of Human Rights, she "spent the 1980s performing life-threatening human rights work."

In an cooperative effort with governments, UN bodies and the International Committee of the Red Cross, Williams served as a chief strategist and spokesperson for the ICBL, which she developed from two non-governmental organizations (NGOs) with a staff of one – herself – to an international powerhouse of 1,300 NGOs in ninety countries.

From its small beginning and official launch in 1992, Williams and the ICBL achieved the campaign's goal of an international treaty banning antipersonnel landmines during a diplomatic conference held in Oslo in September 1997. The Ottawa Treaty that banned land-mines is credited to her and the ICBL. Three weeks later, she and the ICBL were awarded the Nobel Peace Prize. At that time, she became the tenth woman – and third American woman – in its almost hundred-year history to receive the Prize.

In November 2004, after discussions with Iranian Peace Laureates Shirin Ebadi and Professor Wangari Maathai of Kenya, Williams established the Nobel Women's Initiative which was launched in January 2006. Williams has since served as its chair. This initiative brought together six of the female Peace Laureates, the women seek to use their influence to promote the work of women working for peace with justice and equality. (Aung San Suu Kyi is an honorary member.)

In 2020, Williams called upon Chevron Corporation to pay cleanup costs to the residents of the Lago Agrio oil field which were awarded in 2011 and have been in litigation ever since.

Williams is quoted as saying, "The image of peace with a dove flying over a rainbow and people holding hands singing kumbaya ends up infantilizing people who believe that sustainable peace is possible. If you think that singing and looking at a rainbow will suddenly make peace appear then you're not capable of meaningful thought, or understanding the difficulties of the world."

In 2019, Williams called for a treaty to end violence against women, in support of Every Woman Coalition.

== Academic career ==
Since 2007, Williams has been the Sam and Cele Keeper Professor in Peace and Social Justice in the Graduate College of Social Work at the University of Houston. Before that she had been a distinguished visiting professor of global justice at the college since 2003.

== Recognition ==
Williams continues to be recognized for her contributions to human rights and global security. She is the recipient of fifteen honorary degrees. In 2004, in its first such listing, she was named by Forbes magazine as one of the 100 most powerful women in the world. She is one of the female Nobel Prize laureates to be recognized as a "Woman of the Year" by Glamour magazine – which has also honoured Hillary Clinton, Katie Couric and Barbara Walters.

== Publications ==
Williams' work includes articles for magazines and newspapers, for example the Wall Street Journal, International Herald Tribune, The Independent (UK), The Irish Times, The Toronto Globe and Mail, Los Angeles Times, La Jornada (Mexico), The Review of the International Red Cross, Columbia University's Journal of Politics and Society.

She added several chapters to numerous books:

- The Personal Philosophies of Remarkable Men and Women, edited by Jay Allison and Dan Gediman;
- A Memory, A Monologue, A Rant, and A Prayer
- Lessons from our Fathers, by Keith McDermott
- Girls Like Us: 40 Extraordinary Women Celebrate Girlhood in Story, Poetry and Song, by Gina Misiroglu;
- The Way We Will be 50 Years from Today: 60 of the World's Greatest Minds Share Their Visions of the Next Half-Century
- Williams co-authored a seminal book on the landmine crisis in 1995, After the Guns Fall Silent: The Enduring Legacy of Landmines.
- Her book, released at the end of March 2008, Banning Landmines: Disarmament, Citizen Diplomacy and Human Security, analyzes the Mine Ban Treaty and its impact on other human security- related work.
- In March 2013, her memoir, My Name Is Jody Williams: A Vermont Girl's Winding Path to the Nobel Peace Prize, was released.

== See also ==
- List of female Nobel laureates
- List of peace activists
- PeaceJam
