= International Security Forum =

International conference

The International Security Forum (ISF) is a Swiss government-sponsored international conference on security policy in Europe, North America, and beyond. The biannual forum is held alternately in Zurich and Geneva.

== Background ==
The ISF is a Swiss contribution to NATO’s Partnership for Peace initiative. It was launched in Zurich in April 1994 as a platform for discussion and exchange on international security policy ranging from political-military to human security issues. The 10th edition of the ISF occurred from 22 to 24 April 2013 in Geneva under the overarching theme "Facing a World of Transitions". The 2013 forum also hosted the 15th Annual Conference of the Partnership for Peace (PfP) Consortium of Defence Academies and Security Studies Institutes.

== Sponsors and partners ==
The ISF's main sponsors are the Swiss Federal Department of Defence, Civil Protection and Sports and the Federal Department of Foreign Affairs. The co-organizers include the Geneva Centre for Security Policy, the Geneva Centre for the Democratic Control of Armed Forces, the Geneva International Centre for Humanitarian Demining, the Graduate Institute of International and Development Studies, the Center for Security Studies (CSS) and its International Relations and Security Network at the Swiss Federal Institute of Technology in Zurich, as well as the PfP Consortium of Defence Academies and Security Studies Institutes. A number of other institutions are involved in the organization of the various conference panels.

== Participants ==
The ISF is attended by researchers, academics, diplomats and other government officials, military officers, and representatives of international and non-governmental organizations. In 2013, approximately 700 speakers, participants and media representatives attended the ISF. About 55% of the conference participants came from outside Switzerland.
