= Raz =

Raz or RAZ may refer to:

== People ==
- Raz Gal-Or (born 1994), Israeli businessman in China
- Raz Hershko (born 1998), Israeli European champion and Olympic judoka
- Raz Shavit (born 1992), Israeli football striker
- Raz (surname)
- Razputin, protagonist of the video game Psychonauts

== Places ==
=== Channel Islands ===
- Ile de Raz, an island offshore of Alderney

=== France ===
- Pointe du Raz, the western point of the commune of Plogoff, Finistère, France
- Alderney Race (Raz Blanchard), a strong tidal current between La Hague and Alderney
- Raz de Sein, a stretch of water located between the Ile de Sein and the Pointe du Raz in Finistère in the Brittany region of France

=== Iran ===
- Raz, Iran, a city in North Khorasan Province, Iran
- Raz, Ardabil, a village in Ardabil Province, Iran
- Raz, Razavi Khorasan, a village in Razavi Khorasan Province, Iran
- Raz, Zanjan, a village in Zanjan Province, Iran
- Raz Galleh, a village in Kerman Province, Iran
- Raz Rural District, an administrative subdivision of North Khorasan Province, Iran
- Shiraz, a city in Iran

== Other uses ==
- RAZ, IATA airport code for Rawalakot Airport

== See also ==
- Raj (disambiguation)
- RAS (disambiguation)
- Raaz (disambiguation)
- Razz (disambiguation)
- Rez (disambiguation)
- Razi (disambiguation)
