= Rass =

Rass or RASS may refer to:

== Places ==
- Ar Rass a city in central Saudi Arabia
- Rass, Bareq, a neighborhood in southwestern Saudi Arabia

See also Ar Rass (disambiguation) and Ras (disambiguation)#Places for similarly named places

== People ==
- Ralph Felton, nicknamed "Rass", (1932–2011), American football player
- Andreas Räss (1794–1887), German bishop
- Manuel Rass (born 1998), South African rugby player
- Murad Raas (born 1969), Pakistani politician

== Science and technology ==
- Radio acoustic sounding system
- ROSAT All-Sky Survey
- Richmond Agitation-Sedation Scale
