= Arras (disambiguation) =

Arras is the capital of the Pas-de-Calais department in northern France.

Arras may also refer to:

== People and places ==
- August Arras (1881–1968), Estonian politician
- Konrad Arras (1876–1930), Estonian politician
- Wim Arras (born 1964), Belgian cyclist
- Arras, Albania, a village in eastern Albania

== Other ==
- Battle of Arras (disambiguation), several battles of that name
- Arras culture, an archaeological culture of the British Iron Age
- Arras-class aviso, a class of thirty French avisos
- Arras Mountain, a summit in British Columbia, Canada
- HMCS Arras, a Battle class trawler
- A hanging tapestry, known chiefly for the one behind which Polonius hides in Gertrude's closet scene, in Shakespeare's Hamlet (Act III, Scene iv)
- Las arras, in Hispanic weddings, the thirteen coins presented to the bride by the groom, to symbolize the groom's commitment to 'provide' for his bride and make his wealth hers
- The Arras, the second tallest building in Asheville, North Carolina, United States

== See also ==
- d'Arras, a French surname
- Ar Rass (disambiguation)
