= Res =

Res or RES may refer to:

== Sciences ==
=== Computing ===
- Russian and Eurasian Security Network
- Spanish Supercomputing Network (Red Española de Supercomputación)

=== Energy ===
- RES - The School for Renewable Energy Science
- US Renewable Electricity Standard
- Renewable Energy Systems, a UK company

=== Mathematics ===
- Residue (complex analysis) function

=== Medicine ===
- Reticuloendothelial system, in anatomy
- Red ear syndrome (RES)

=== Archaeology ===
- Répertoire d'Épigraphie Sémitique, a journal publishing Semitic language inscriptions

== Latin word meaning "thing" ==
- Entity (disambiguation)
- Object (philosophy)
- The first word of several Latin phrases:
  - Res divina (service of the gods)
  - Res cogitans, Descartes' mental world
  - Res communis, a thing that is owned in common
  - Res extensa, Descartes' physical world
  - Res gestae (Things done)
  - Res inter alios acta (A thing done between others)
  - Res ipsa loquitur (The thing speaks for itself)
  - Res judicata (A matter [already] judged)
  - Res nullius (An unowned thing)
  - Res publica (A public thing), the origin of the word republic

== Organizations ==
- Rail Express Systems, a mail service of British Rail
- Railway Enthusiasts Society, New Zealand
- Royal Economic Society, London, a learned society
- Royal Entomological Society, London, a learned society

== Places ==
- Reservoir railway station, Melbourne
- Resistencia International Airport (IATA airport code: RES)
- Republic of El Salvador

== People ==
- Res (singer), American singer

== Arts, entertainment, and media ==
=== Literature ===
- RES (magazine), bimonthly

=== Music ===
==== Songs ====
- "R.E.S.", a song by Cardiacs from The Seaside
- "The Res", a song by the American band Bright from their self-titled album

== See also ==
- RE5 (disambiguation)
- Rez (disambiguation)
