= Ras =

Ras or RAS may refer to:

== Arts and media ==
- RAS Records Real Authentic Sound, a reggae record label
- Rundfunk Anstalt Südtirol, a south Tyrolese public broadcasting service
- Rás 1, an Icelandic radio station
- Rás 2, an Icelandic radio station
- Raise A Suilen, a Japanese band

== Organizations ==
- Railway Air Services, a UK airline
- Rajasthan Administrative Service, India
- Remote Astronomical Society Observatory of New Mexico
- Research and Analysis Service, India
- Richard Allen Schools, a charter school system in Ohio, USA
- Richardson Adventist School, now North Dallas Adventist Academy
- IEEE Robotics and Automation Society
- Royal American Shows, an American travelling carnival company operating from the 1920s to the 1990s
- Royal Asiatic Society of Great Britain and Ireland
- Royal Astronomical Society, UK, founded 1820
- Russian Academy of Sciences

== Biology ==
- RAAS, the renin–angiotensin system, a hormone system that regulates blood pressure
- Recurrent aphthous stomatitis or canker sores
- Renal artery stenosis, the narrowing of the renal arteries
- Respiratory airway secretory cell, cells in humans and some other mammals that maintain airway health
- Reticular activating system in the brain, regulating wakefulness
- Retinoic acid syndrome, a complication of acute promyelocytic leukemia
- RAS supergroup or SAR supergroup, a eukaryote clade
- Ras superfamily, a superfamily of signalling proteins
  - Ras subfamily, a family of signalling proteins

== Science and technology ==
- .ras, a SunOS raster format
- RAS algorithm, an algorithm for iterative proportional fitting in economics
- Recirculating aquaculture system, an aquarium system that filters water rather than requiring new water supplies
- Registration, Admission and Status, a telephony protocol under H.323
- Reliability, availability and serviceability of computer hardware
- Remote access service, on a network
- Reusable Asset Specification of software
- Row Address Strobe in dynamic random-access memory
- Russian Accounting Standards

== People ==
- Ras (surname), several people
- Ras, nickname for the given name of Rasmus (given name)
- Ras Muhamad (born 1982), Indonesian reggae singer
- Ras Sheehama (1966–2025), Namibian reggae musician
- Nicholas Furlong (musician) (born 1986), known as RAS, American singer, songwriter, rapper, and record producer

=== Fictional characters ===
- Ra's al Ghul, a fictional villain in Batman media
- Rassius "Ras" Luine, a character from Tales of Eternia
- Ras (Ninjago), character in Ninjago

== Other uses ==
- Ras (fascism), a title for a regional leader in fascist Italy
- Ras (title), an Ethiopian aristocratic and court title, as in Ras Tafari
- Ras cheese, a variety popular in Egypt
- RAS syndrome, "redundant acronym syndrome" syndrome
- Reasonable articulable suspicion, a burden of proof in the United States legal system
- Rás Tailteann, an annual cycling race in Ireland
- Stari Ras, a capital city of medieval Serbian state of Raška
- Replenishment at sea, providing naval ships with supplies while at sea
- Catepanate of Ras, province of the Byzantine Empire

== See also ==
- Ra (disambiguation)
- Rass (disambiguation)
- Raz (disambiguation)
- Rasa (disambiguation)
