= Collège Sismondi =

Secondary school in Geneva, Switzerland

Coordinates: 46.2215°N 6.1425°E

- Geneva; Switzerland

Information
- Type: Public secondary schools
- Established: 1975

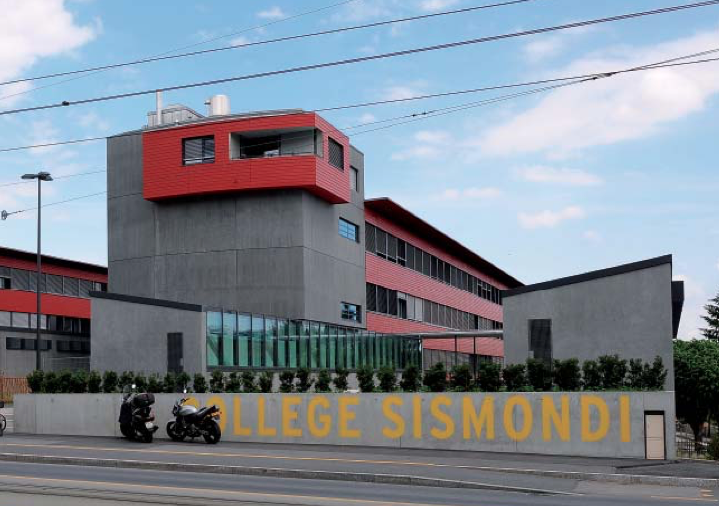
Collège Sismondi

The Collège Sismondi, is one of 11 public secondary schools in Geneva offering a 'Certificat de maturité gymnasiale', which provides access to all Swiss universities.

The school is located right next to the United Nations Office in Geneva and across the Maison de la paix. Founded in 1975, it was named in tribute to Jean-Charles-Léonard Simonde, also known as Jean-Charles-Léonard Simonde de Sismondi.

== Admission & dropout rate ==
Admission to the Collège is selective, only students with good grades in German & Mathematics at the end of the 9th year of obligatory schooling (around 15 years old) can be admitted. Only a maximum of 25% of students in this age group enter the Collèges in Geneva. Approximately 60% of those admitted will not successfully finish their studies, and a large amount will do it in 5 or 6 years.

Postobligatory Secondary Education Schools in Geneva have an average dropout rate of: 50% in the first year, 15% in the second year, 35% in the third year and 20% in the fourth year.

== System ==
Students who want to pursue an education past the (obligatory) Cycle d'Orientation enter the four-year college from approximately 15-19.

The successful completion of the four-year studies, offers direct access to universities & the Swiss Federal Institute of Technology.

== School facilities ==
The school has a cafeteria that is accessible to all students who want to eat there. Dishes are offered around noon, but students can go freely at any time.

There is also a library which opens during the week from 07:30 to 17:30, except from Wednesday which opens from 07:30 to 16:30. Students can go there to borrow books or documents with their student card. There is also a computer room with computers available for the students.

== Curriculum ==
College Sismondi is one of four high schools in Geneva, offering a Bilingual Maturity (either French-English or French-German)

The Formation Gymnasiale consists of:

- 11 Fundamental subjects : French, second national language (German or Italian), third national language or English or Latin, mathematics (2 levels), physics, chemistry, biology, history, geography, philosophy, visual arts or music.
- 1 Specific option : Latin, Greek, third national language - German ou Italian - English, Spanish, physics & applied math, biology and chemistry, economics & Law, visual arts or music.
- 1 Complementary option in 3rd year: Applied math, computer science, robotics, physics, chemistry, history, geography, philosophy, economics & law, visual arts, music, sports.
- 1 Particular subject : Physical education.
- 1 Maturity research project in third and fourth year: Personal research project done over the last two years.
