= Profiler =

Profiler or profiling may refer to:

- Profiler (TV series), an NBC television drama series about a criminologist profiler
- Profiler, a surface analysis instrument also called a profilometer
- Profiler, a fungicide containing fosetyl-Al and fluopicolide
- Profiling (computer programming), a programming tool that can track the performance of another computer program
- Offender profiling, or criminal profiling, work by criminologists who study criminals' behavior for psychological clues to aid in capturing them
- Wind profiler, an instrument to measure wind speed and direction at various elevations above the ground
