= Greminger =

Greminger is a surname. Notable people with the surname include:

- János Greminger (1929–2009), Hungarian basketball player
- Thomas Greminger (born 1961), Swiss diplomat
