= Parallel History Project =

Website with information about the Cold War

The Parallel History Project on Cooperative Security (PHP) is an open source website reference compilation, research project, and analysis nexus sparked by the progressive increase in the declassification of NATO and Soviet bloc documents related to Cold War activities, as viewed by both sides. Currently, research into Soviet bloc archives has expanded the project's scope to the Global Cold War, with views specifically on the Indian subcontinent and Southeast Asia.

According to the site:

[PHP] seeks to collect, analyze, and interpret these premier sources for the study of contemporary international history. By relating them to current security issues, the PHP enhances their understanding by highlighting how they differ from the recent past. It explores how the different alliance experiences have influenced the attitudes and behavior of the present members of the enlarged NATO and the Partnership for Peace (PfP).

The Parallel History Project is based at the Swiss Federal Institute of Technology in Zurich, Switzerland and is run in partnership with the International Relations and Security Network (ISN) and the Center for Security Studies (CSS). Vojtech Mastny has been the project's coordinator.

== Reviews ==
- Parallel History Project on Cooperative Security. Teachinghistory.org. Accessed 2 June 2011.
