= Induced coma =

Medical procedure

- Other names: Medically induced coma
- Specialty: Neurology, critical care medicine

An induced coma – also known as a medically induced coma (MIC), barbiturate-induced coma, or drug-induced coma – is a temporary coma (a deep state of unconsciousness) brought on by a controlled dose of an anesthetic drug, often a barbiturate such as pentobarbital or thiopental. Other intravenous anesthetic drugs such as midazolam or propofol may be used.

Drug-induced comas are used to protect the brain during major neurosurgery, as a last line of treatment in certain cases of status epilepticus that have not responded to other treatments, and in refractory intracranial hypertension following traumatic brain injury.

Induced coma usually results in significant systemic adverse effects. The patient is likely to completely lose respiratory drive and require mechanical ventilation; gut motility is reduced; hypotension can complicate efforts to maintain cerebral perfusion pressure and often requires the use of vasopressor drugs. Hypokalemia often results. The completely immobile patient is at increased risk of bed sores as well as infection from catheters.

The presence of an endotracheal tube and mechanical ventilation alone are not indications of continuous sedation and coma. Only certain conditions such as intracranial hypertension, refractory status epilepticus, the inability to oxygenate with movement, justify the high risks of medically induced comas.

Brain disruption from sedation can lead to an eight times increased risk of the development of ICU delirium. This is associated with a doubled risk of mortality during hospital admission. For every one day of delirium, there is a 10% increased risk of death. Medically induced comas that achieve a RASS level of −4 or −5 are an independent predictor of death.

Although patients are not sleeping while sedated, they can experience hallucinations and delusions that are often graphic and traumatizing in nature. This can lead to post-ICU PTSD after hospital discharge. Patients that develop ICU delirium are at 120 times greater risk of long-term cognitive impairments.

Considering the high risks of medically induced comas, protocols such as the ABCDEF Bundle and PADIS guidelines have been developed to guide ICU teams to avoid unnecessary sedation and comas. ICU teams that master these protocols to keep patients as awake and mobile as possible are called "Awake and Walking ICUs". These are teams that only implement medically induced comas when the possible benefits of sedation outweigh the high risks during specific cases.

Survivors of prolonged medically induced comas are at high risk of post-ICU syndrome and may require extended physical, cognitive, and psychological rehabilitation.

== Theory ==
Barbiturates reduce the metabolic rate of brain tissue, as well as the cerebral blood flow. With these reductions, the blood vessels in the brain narrow, resulting in a shrunken brain, and hence lower intracranial pressure. The hope is that, with the swelling relieved, the pressure decreases and some or all brain damage may be averted. Several studies have supported this theory by showing reduced mortality when treating refractory intracranial hypertension with a barbiturate coma.

About 60% of the glucose and oxygen used by the brain is meant for its electrical activity and the rest for all other activities such as metabolism. When barbiturates are given to brain injured patients for induced coma, they act by reducing the electrical activity of the brain, which reduces the metabolic and oxygen demand. Their action limits oxidative damage to lipid membranes and may scavenge free radicals. They also lead to reduced vasogenic edema, fatty acid release and intracellular calcium release.

The infusion dose rate of barbiturates is increased under monitoring by electroencephalography until burst suppression or cortical electrical silence (isoelectric "flatline") is attained. Once there is improvement in the patient's general condition, the barbiturates are withdrawn gradually and the patient regains consciousness.

Controversy exists over the benefits of using barbiturates to control intracranial hypertension. Some studies have found that barbiturate-induced coma can reduce intracranial hypertension but does not necessarily prevent brain damage. Furthermore, the reduction in intracranial hypertension may not be sustained. Some randomized trials have failed to demonstrate any survival or morbidity benefit of induced coma in diverse conditions such as neurosurgical operations, head trauma, intracranial aneurysm rupture, intracranial hemorrhage, ischemic stroke, and status epilepticus. If the patient survives, cognitive impairment may also follow recovery from the coma. Due to these risks, barbiturate-induced coma should be reserved for cases of refractory intracranial pressure elevation.

== See also ==
- Insulin shock therapy
- Traumatic brain injury
