= Russian and Eurasian Security Network =

Open-source service

- Logo
- Type: Think-tank
- Established: 2005
- Affiliations: Swiss Federal Institute of Technology, International Relations and Security Network, Center for Security Studies
- Location: Zürich, Switzerland

The Russian and Eurasian Security Network (RES) was an open-source service that encouraged the exchange of information among international relations and security professionals worldwide. It maintained a large digital library of documents related to Russia and Eurasia and provided the framework for studies of security-related developments in Russia and the states of the Eurasian region (Armenia, Azerbaijan, Georgia, Moldova, Belarus, Ukraine, Kazakhstan, Kyrgyzstan, Tajikistan, Turkmenistan and Uzbekistan).

It was based at the Swiss Federal Institute of Technology in Zurich, Switzerland and was part of the International Relations and Security Network (ISN) and the Center for Security Studies (CSS). The RES website was closed down in August 2012.

The two RES in-house publications were migrated to the website of the Center for Security Studies:

- The Russian Analytical Digest, an electronic journal covering political, economic and social developments in Russia and its regions.
- The Caucasus Analytical Digest (CAD), a monthly internet publication analyzing the political, economic, and social situation in the three South Caucasus states of Armenia, Azerbaijan and Georgia within the context of international and security dimensions of this region's development.
