= HACKEN =

Ukrainian cybersecurity company

- Industry: Cybersecurity
- Founded: 2017
- Headquarters: Tallinn, Estonia
- Website: https://hacken.io/

Hacken, stylized as HACKEN, is an international cybersecurity company with Ukrainian roots that has combated Russia in cyberwar during the Russia invasion of Ukraine. The headquarters is located in Tallinn, Estonia, while the team was moved from Kyiv to Lisbon in March 2022.

== History ==
Hacken was founded in 2017 by a group of Ukrainian specialists. Hacken is officially registered as Hacken OÜ in Tallinn, Estonia. In 2018, the CER.live platform was launched, which assessed the security of exchanges trading digital assets, and is used by Forbes in evaluating cryptoexchanges.

On 2 March 2021, Hacken’s anti-DDOS tool DisBalancer was launched under the umbrella of the Hacken Foundation.

== Cyberwarfare with Russia ==
Since February 24, 2022, Hacken has been involved in countering Russian aggression in cyberspace. On March 4, 2022, DisBalancer was redesigned to serve as the biggest DDOS platform for the Ukrainian IT army against Russia. It was called “Liberator" as a reaction to the invasion of Russia. Liberator had attracted 10,000 collaborators from 150 countries in first months of the war.

In late February and early March 2022, Hacken adjusted its bug bounty platform HackenProof to serve national defensive and offensive aims. The defensive program runs under the name “Call for Ukrainian cyber defense. Stop the war”. The offensive program started on 27 February was named “Call for exploits. Stop the war”. It focused on finding and using vulnerabilities of Russian hosting providers, ISPs, aerospace/air control, SCADA systems, banks, public services, etc.

== Review ==
- Hacken occupies a major part of the first academia comprehensive analysis of the Ukrainian cyber-resistance amidst 2022 Russian invasion of Ukraine which performed by the Center for Security Studies (CSS), ETH Zürich, Switzerland.
- Spanish El Independiente described Hacken’s office in Barcelona as perhaps the most hidden side of the Russian-Ukrainian war.
