= Razz =

Razz may refer to:

- Razz (poker), a form of stud poker
- Razz (rapper), winner of MGP Nordic 2002
- "Razz" (song), a Kings of Leon song
- Razz, Arab Rock Jazz, a music genre promoted by Aziz Maraka & Razz
- Blowing a raspberry
- Golden Raspberry Awards, typically referred to as "Razzies"
- Madame Razz, a fictional character in the television series She-Ra: Princess of Power

== See also ==
- Raz (disambiguation)
- Razzie
- Razzy
