= Geneva Centre for Security Policy =

International foundation based in Geneva, Switzerland

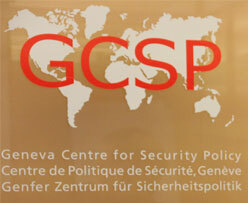

The Geneva Centre for Security Policy (GCSP) is an international foundation that was established in 1995 under Swiss law to "promote the building and maintenance of peace, security and stability". The GCSP was founded by the Federal Department of Defence, Civil Protection and Sports in cooperation with the Federal Department of Foreign Affairs as a Swiss contribution to Partnership for Peace (PfP).

== Location ==
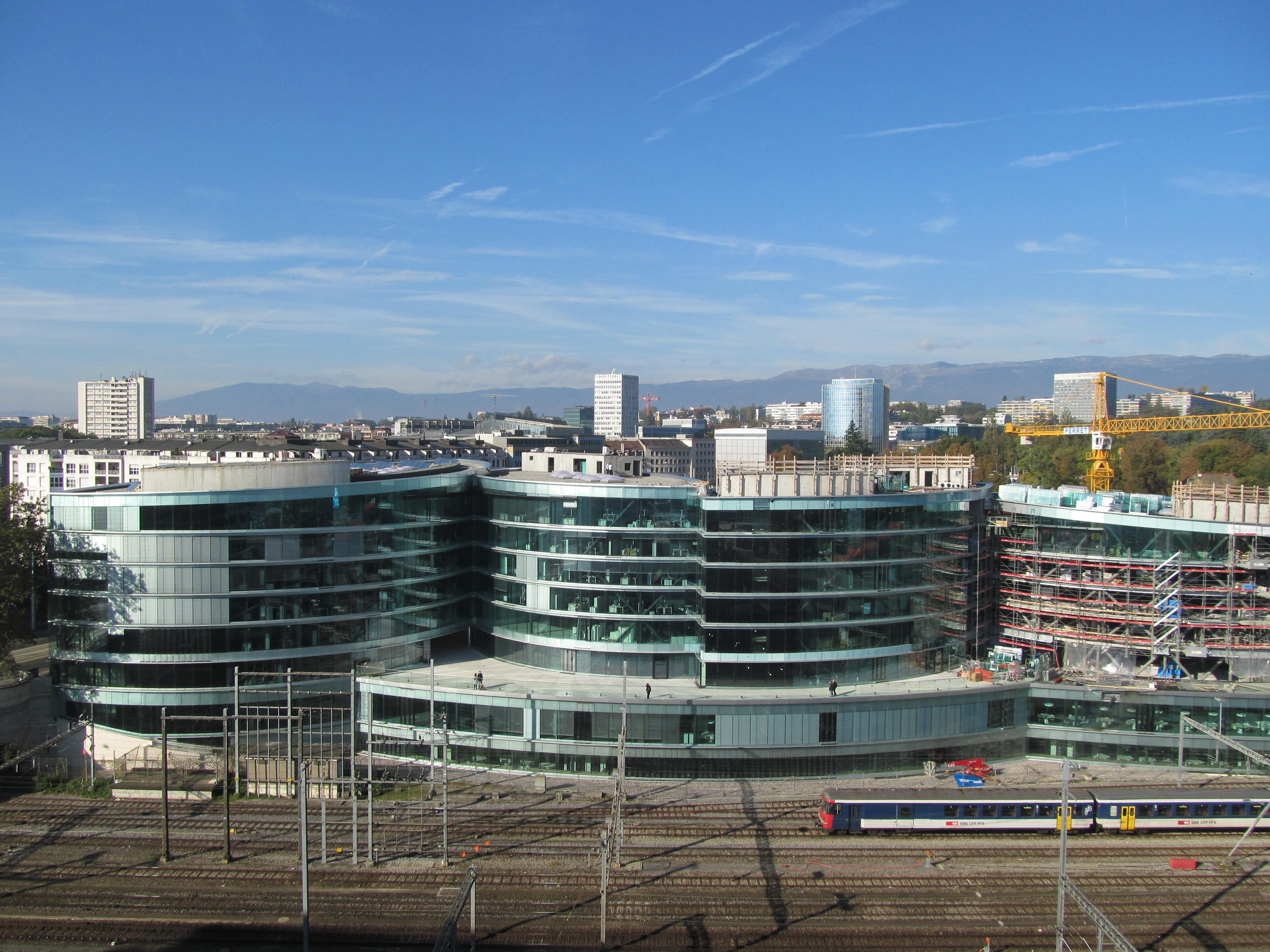
The Maison de la paix 2013

GCSP's headquarters are in Geneva, Switzerland in the Maison de la paix building (the house of peace), which is owned by the Graduate Institute of International and Development Studies. It shares the building with the Graduate Institute, the Geneva International Centre for Humanitarian Demining (GICHD), and the Geneva Centre for the Democratic Control of Armed Forces (DCAF). It is the main element of the campus de la paix (the campus of peace).

== Activities ==
GCSP's core activity is the provision of executive education and training in comprehensive international peace and security policy for mid-career diplomats, military officers, and civil servants from foreign, defence, and other relevant ministries, as well as from international organisations. Participants in GCSP courses come from countries of the Euro-Atlantic Partnership Council, NATO's Mediterranean Dialogue, the Istanbul Cooperation Initiative, and beyond, including South and East Asia and Africa. In addition to its three long-term courses (each lasting from three to nine months) offered in Geneva, the GCSP also offers tailor-made courses in Geneva, New York City, Dakar, Amman, Baku, Addis Ababa, Yerevan and Sarajevo.

GCSP's work focuses on regional development, emerging security challenges, leadership, and crisis and conflict management. It also runs an incubator for new initiatives in the international relations sector, named The Creative Spark. Currently incubated projects include the Article 109 Coalition, an international civil society organisation calling for UN Charter reform, headed by Heba Aly.

== Governance and funding ==
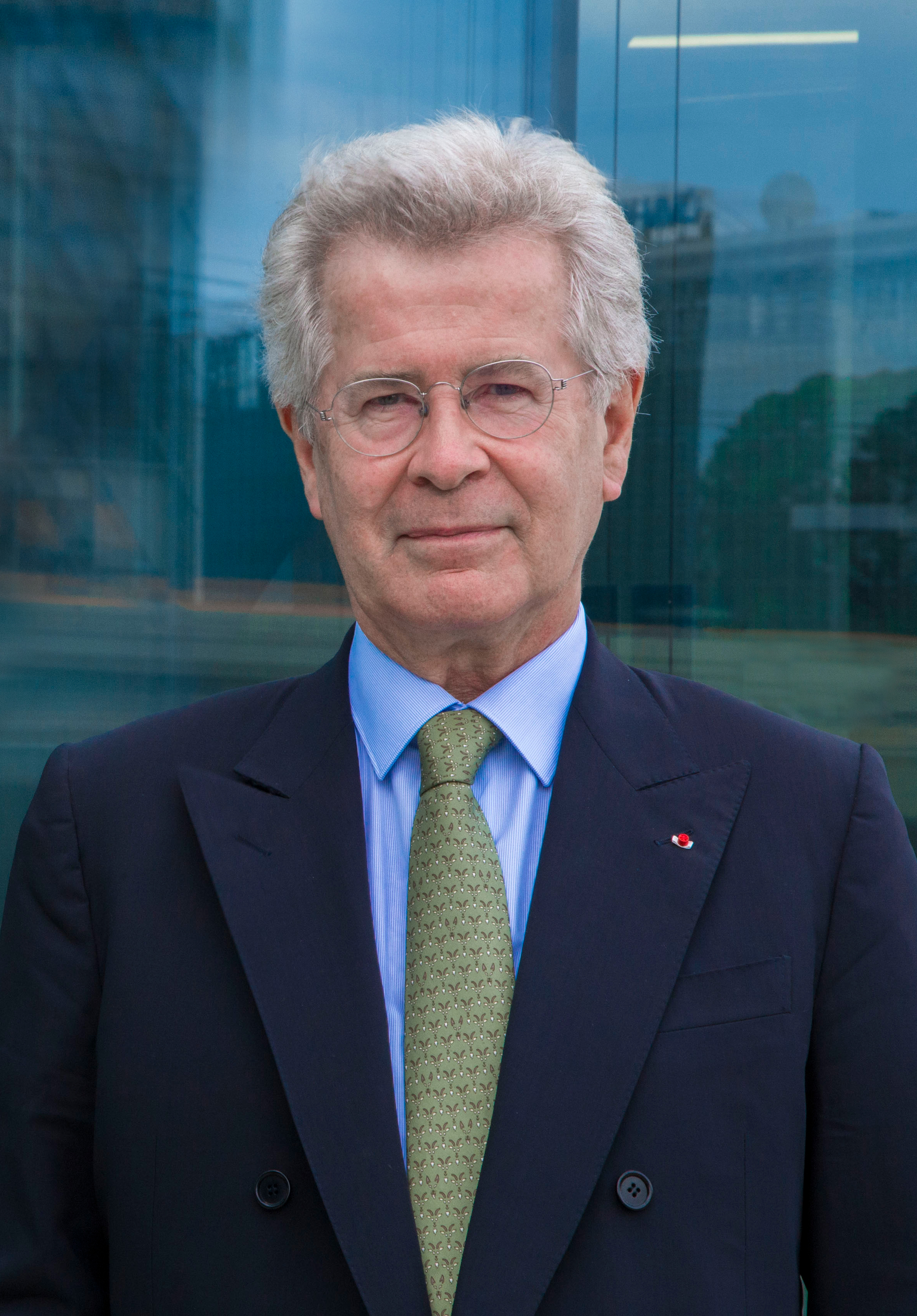
Ambassador Jean-David Levitte 2019

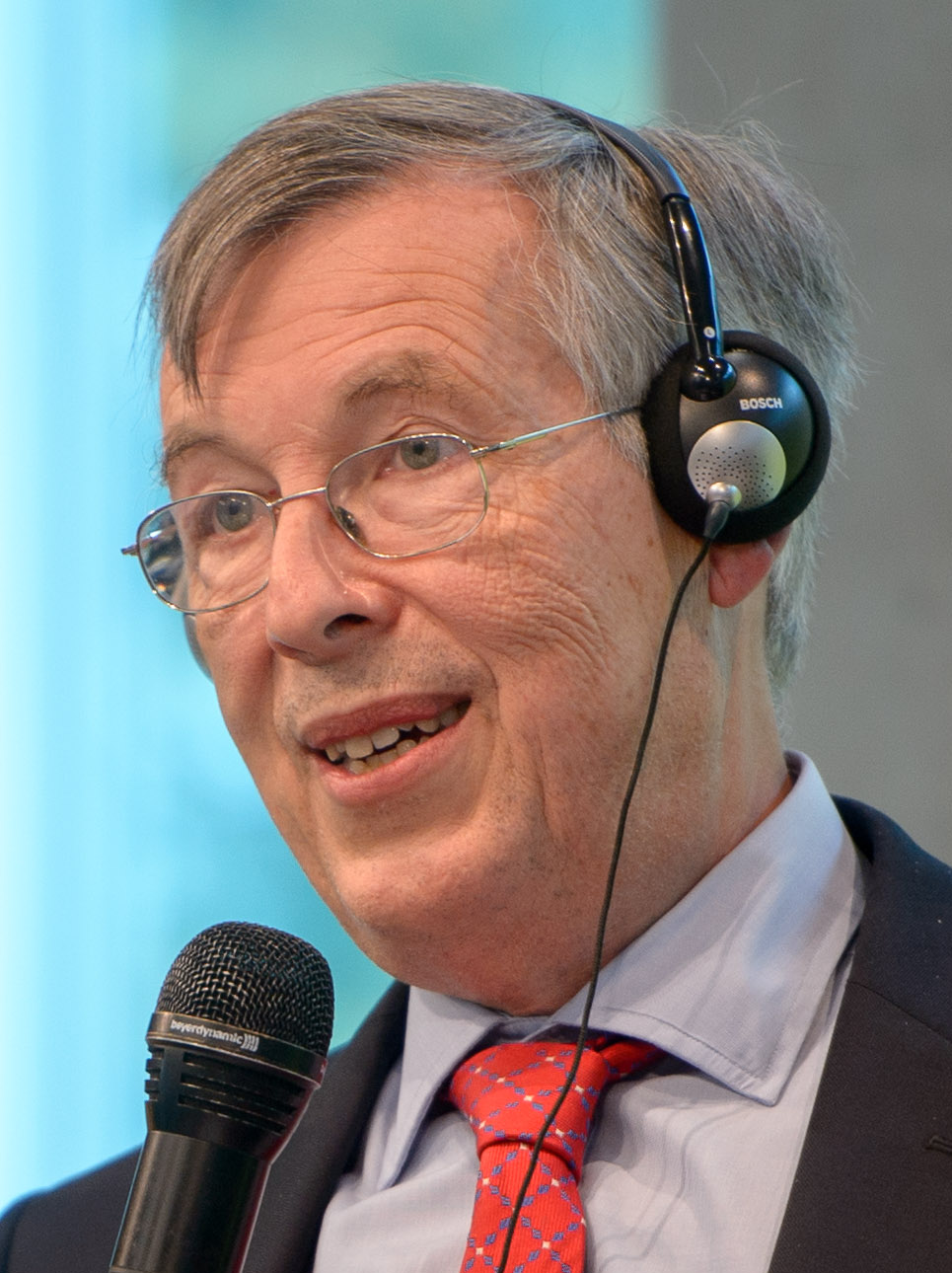
Francois Heisbourg 2015

The GCSP's governing body is the Foundation Council, which consists of representatives of 52 member states and the Canton of Geneva. On 2 September 2019, Ambassador Jean-David Levitte was appointed President of the Geneva Centre for Security Policy Foundation Council. The director of the GCSP is Ambassador Thomas Greminger since May 2021. The former chairman of the Foundation Council was François Heisbourg.

The Swiss government is the principal contributor to GCSP's budget. Other council members, partner states, and institutions also support the GCSP by seconding faculty, funding scholarships, and contributing to other aspects of the centre's activities.

== See also ==
- Maison de la paix
