= Razzy =

Razzy is a given name. Notable people with the name include:

- Razzy Bailey (1939–2021), American country music artist
- Razzy Hammadi (born 1979), French politician

== See also ==
- Razzy Dazzy Spasm Band (disambiguation)
- Golden Raspberry Awards, or Razzies, award ceremony for the worst films
