= Geneva International Centre for Humanitarian Demining =

Landmine-removal organisation

Logo

Director
Ambassador Tobias Privitelli
Foundation
In 1998 by the Swiss government as a non-profit foundation
Staff
95
Headquarters
Maison de la paix,
Geneva,
Switzerland
Website
www.gichd.org
Location
46.2233°N 6.1467°E

The Geneva International Centre for Humanitarian Demining (GICHD; French: Centre international de déminage humanitaire - CIDHG) is an international organisation working in mine action and explosive ordnance risk reduction, with a focus on landmines, cluster munitions and ammunition stockpiles. Based in the Maison de la paix in Geneva, it is legally a non-profit foundation in Switzerland.

It was established by Switzerland and several other countries in April 1998. In March 2003, the GICHD concluded a status agreement with the Swiss Government guaranteeing its independence and freedom of action. The Centre has around 95 staff members and is supported by governments and organizations. Tobias Privitelli was awarded the title of ambassador for his new role as director of the Geneva International Centre for Humanitarian Demining (GICHD) in Geneva which he began in August 2024.

== Vision and Mission ==
The GICHD is guided by the vision of a world free from the risks posed by all types of explosive ordnance, in which both individuals and communities can thrive. In such a world, people are safe from the threat of physical harm and its immense psychological, social, and economic consequences. They live in communities where explosive ordnance is no longer an obstacle to livelihoods and does not limit access to fundamental services. Individually, as well as collectively, they can work towards a just, stable, inclusive, and sustainably prosperous society.To attain this vision, the GICHD helps partners at all levels, starting with national authorities, to establish the key ingredients that are necessary for them to address the risks posed by explosive ordnance in a safe, effective, and efficient way.

The Centre promotes solutions that are innovative, to ensure that the sector adapts to evolving challenges; tailored, to respond to the specific context in which they are to be employed; and sustainable, to foster the long-term perspective of explosive ordnance risk reduction and the corresponding need for nationally owned responses.

== Competence ==
The GICHD is an international centre of expertise and knowledge, operating in line with humanitarian principles, supporting approximately 40 affected states and territories every year. Its work focuses on four main areas: facilitating dialogue and cooperation, providing technical support and training, advancing research on mine action and ammunition management and supporting the development and implementation of international norms and standards.

The Centre's areas of competence include anti-personnel mines, all other types of mines and explosive ordnance in a broad sense of the term, including all forms of mines, booby traps, unexploded ordnance (UXO) including cluster munitions, and abandoned ordnance (AXO). The GICHD responds across the full spectrum of emergency, reconstruction, peace-keeping, disarmament, reconstruction and development. It does so by respecting the primary responsibility of affected states for mine action, and by placing emphasis on local ownership and capacity building.

== Partners ==
The Centre's main partners are national governments, international and regional organisations, local and international non-governmental organisations, research centres and commercial companies working in the area of mine action and explosive ordnance. Its sister organisations are the Geneva Centre for the Democratic Control of Armed Forces and the Geneva Centre for Security Policy.

== Activities ==
The GICHD, in partnership with others, strives to provide capacity development support, undertake applied research and develop standards, all aimed at increasing the performance and professionalism of mine action. In addition, the GICHD supports the implementation of relevant instruments of international law.:

=== Operational assistance ===
The Centre’s main operational assistance activities are:

- Strategic management: The Centre supports national authorities to develop and implement their mine action strategies and plans, including priority-setting mechanisms, quality management, coordination activities, legislation, mine risk education, gender-sensitive programming and linking mine action and development, including the Millennium Development Goals. Special attention is paid to assisting national authorities to comply with their obligations and commitments stemming from the Ottawa Treaty and other relevant instruments of international law.
- Land release: The Centre develops and implements safe and cost-effective land release methods for mine action, to be used by countries and programmes in the field. Examples of these are land release concepts that are tailored toward individual countries and that address a requirement for national policy, as well as operational concepts. The Centre also assists countries and organisations in the implementation of new and more efficient land release concepts.
- Information management: Mine action relies on evidence. For effective and efficient decision-making and priority setting in mine clearance operations it is crucial to collect accurate and timely data, compile and analyse that data, and provide quality information to support evidence-based planning. This requires a strong and reliable information management system. To this end, the GICHD developed the Information Management System for Mine Action (IMSMA). IMSMA enables partners to leverage quality information for efficient, evidence-based decision making and reporting. IMSMA offers a series of integrated tools, such as mobile data collection, a database that adheres to International Mine Action Standards, and data analytic tools for mapping and reporting. GICHD constantly adapts IMSMA to the latest technology improvements. To support mine action actors at all levels of critical decisions the latest generation of IMSMA (IMSMA CORE) is built by configuring geographic information systems (GIS) tools primarily from Esri. IMSMA Core is a system of tools and processes that can be configured to fit national programmes’ specific operational and reporting requirements, which provide access to information to a wide range of stakeholders, foster information sharing and provide real time maps and reports on the extent of contamination. IMSMA Core is extremely powerful for advanced analytics, workflows, image processing, artificial intelligence and more. IMSMA Core offers all the key benefits of web GIS, while being specifically tailored to mine action and its workflows.
- Technical methods: The Centre provides mine action operators with technical advice and assistance, particularly in technical survey methodologies and management and use of clearance assets such as manual demining, machines and dogs.

=== Knowledge management and dissemination ===
- Applied research: The Centre conducts applied research in cooperation with research organisations and field actors, generating valid and credible findings though studies on how different mine action programmes have addressed common problems and, if appropriate, proposing improved methods.
- Information exchange: The Centre identifies current and emerging topics of importance and improves effective exchange of information in mine action. Opportunities are created for mine action field managers, researchers and other stakeholders to actively participate in both regular and ad hoc fora, including the annual meetings of mine action programme directors, advisors and virtual networks.
- Evaluations: The Centre undertakes evaluations to document the relevance, impact, effectiveness, efficiency and sustainability of mine action programmes, providing appropriate recommendations for performance improvements, and generating lessons-learnt for future guidance. The GICHD maintains an evaluation and best practice data-base.

=== Standards ===
The International Mine Action Standards (IMAS) are standards issued by the United Nations to guide the planning, implementation and management of mine action programmes. They have been developed to improve safety and efficiency in mine action by providing guidance, establishing principles and, in some cases, by defining international requirements and specifications. They provide a frame that encourages the sponsors and managers of mine action programmes and projects to achieve and demonstrate agreed levels of effectiveness and safety. The IMAS are a framework for the development of national mine action standards (NMAS), which can more accurately reflect specific local realities and circumstances in a given country. The GICHD manages the development and review of the IMAS on behalf of the United Nations Mine Action Service.

=== Support of relevant instruments of international law ===
The Centre supports the development and implementation of instruments of international law that address landmines and explosive remnants of war.

==== Anti-Personnel Mine Ban Convention ====
The Convention on the Prohibition of the Use, Stockpiling, Production and Transfer of Anti-personnel Mines and on their Destruction, also known as the Anti-Personnel Mine Ban Convention, is central to the efforts aimed at ending the suffering and casualties caused by anti-personnel mines. The Convention includes a comprehensive ban on anti-personnel mines, a framework of action to address the humanitarian impact of mines, and mechanisms to facilitate cooperation in implementing the Convention. The Convention was concluded on 18 September 1997 and it entered into force on 1 March 1999. As of 1 February 2011, 156 states had joined the Convention. The GICHD has observer status at the States Parties meetings of the Convention.

Since 1999, the GICHD has supported the implementation of the Convention, primarily by hosting meetings of the Standing Committees established by the Convention’s States Parties. In September 2001, the States Parties mandated the GICHD to provide enhanced support to their efforts through the establishment of an Implementation Support Unit (ISU). The ISU's duties include providing support and advice to the Presidency of the Meetings of the State Parties and to Standing Committee Co-chairs, communicating information about the Convention and its implementation, and developing and maintaining a Documentation Centre. On behalf of a group of donors, the GICHD administers its sponsorship programme. In addition, on an ongoing basis, the GICHD provides expert advice to the States Parties on mine clearance, mine risk education, and stockpile destruction.

==== Convention on Certain Conventional Weapons ====
The Convention on Prohibitions or Restrictions on the Use of Certain Conventional Weapons which May Be Deemed to Be Excessively Injurious or to Have Indiscriminate Effects, also known as the Convention on Certain Conventional Weapons (CCW), was adopted on 10 October 1980, and entered into force on 2 December 1983.

The CCW is a framework convention with five protocols, which ban or restrict the use of various types of weapons that are deemed to cause unnecessary suffering, or affect either soldiers or civilians indiscriminately. The weapons covered include: weapons that leave undetectable fragments in the body (Protocol I - 1980); mines, booby-traps and other devices (Protocol II - 1980, amended in 1996); incendiary weapons (Protocol III - 1980); blinding laser weapons (Protocol IV - 1995); and explosive remnants of war (Protocol V - 2003). As of 1 February 2011, 113 States had joined the Convention. The GICHD has observer status at the High Contracting Parties meetings taking place in the framework of the CCW. The Centre has an observer status and assists High Contracting Parties, at their request, in their efforts to minimise human suffering caused by landmines, booby traps and other devices, explosive remnants of war and cluster munitions, which are covered by the ongoing work of the CCW and its Group of Governmental Experts. Since 1999, the GICHD has supported the CCW, primarily by providing expert advice in order to promote the development of, and compliance with, the obligations contained in CCW. In addition, the GICHD is administering the CCW Sponsorship Programme, as mandated by the High Contracting Parties at the CCW Third Review Conference in November 2006.

==== Convention on Cluster Munitions ====
The Convention on Cluster Munitions (CCM) entered into force on 1 August 2010. As of 1 February 2011, 51 States joined the CCM. The Convention prohibits the use, production, stockpiling and transfer of cluster munitions. The GICHD supports the States Parties and other stakeholders with its knowledge and experience in implementing the CCM.

== Location ==
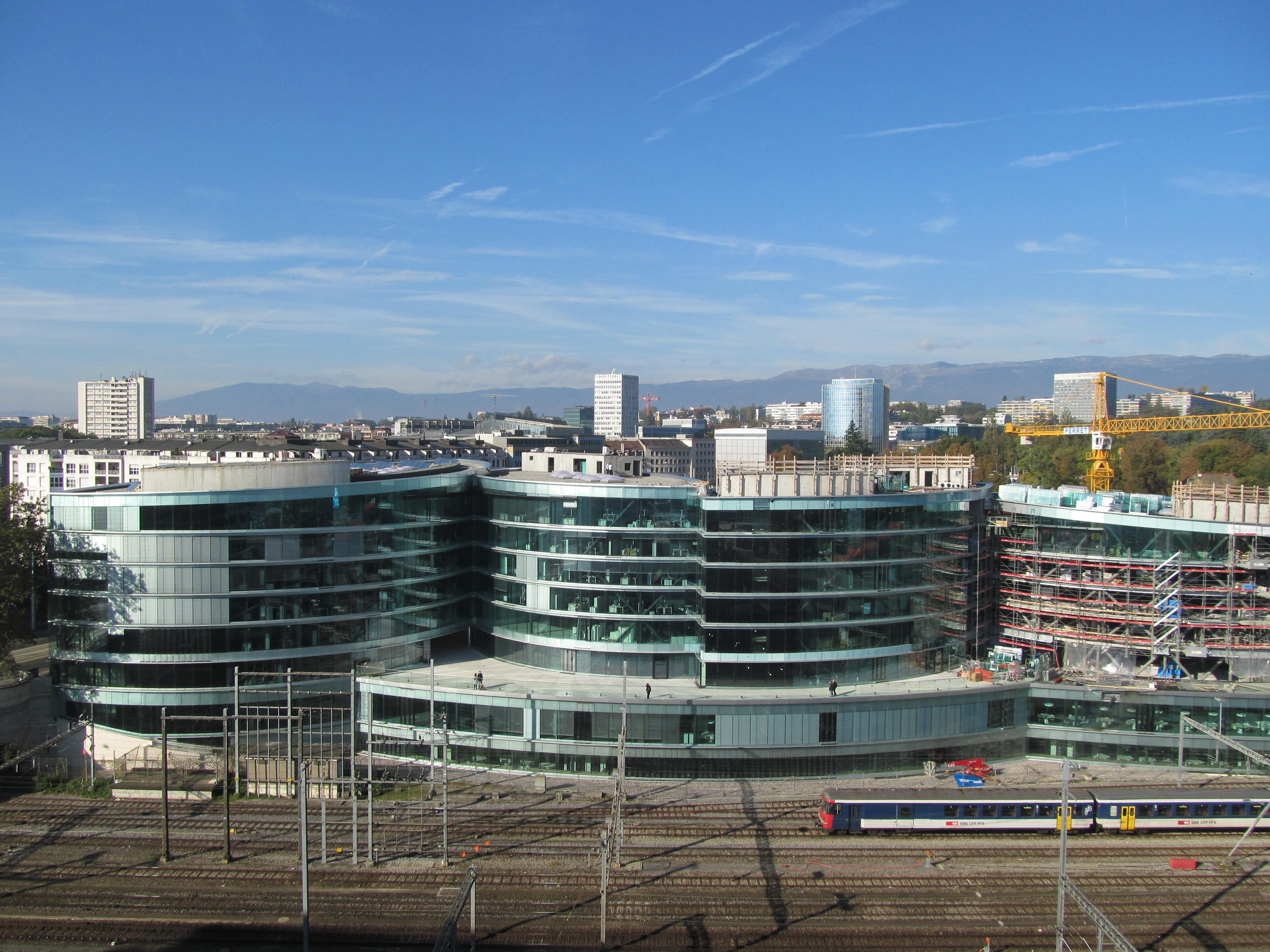
The maison de la paix 2013

GICHD's headquarters are in Geneva, Switzerland in the maison de la paix building (the house of peace), which is owned by the Graduate Institute of International and Development Studies. It shares the building with the Graduate Institute, the Geneva Centre for Security Policy (GCSP), and the Geneva Centre for the Democratic Control of Armed Forces (DCAF). It is the main element of the campus de la paix (the campus of peace).

== See also ==
- Mine clearance agencies
- Gender mainstreaming in mine action
