= Vojtech Mastny (historian) =

Czech historian of the Cold War

Vojtech Mastny (born Vojtěch Mastný; 1936 in Prague, Czechoslovakia) is an American historian of Czech descent, professor of political science and international relations, specializing in the history of the Cold War. He has been considered one of the leading American authorities on Soviet affairs. Mastny received his Ph.D. from Columbia University and has been professor of history and international relations at Columbia, University of Illinois, Boston University and the Johns Hopkins School of Advanced International Studies, as well as professor of strategy at U.S. Naval War College, Fulbright professor at the University of Bonn, senior research scholar at the Woodrow Wilson International Center for Scholars and senior fellow at the National Security Archive. He is the coordinator of the Parallel History Project. In 1996-1998 he was the first researcher awarded Manfred Wörner Fellowship by NATO. Mastny's books include Continental Europe under Nazi Rule, which won him the Clarke F. Ansley award in 1971, Russia's Road to the Cold War (1979), The Helsinki Process and the Reintegration of Europe (1992) and The Cold War and Soviet Insecurity: The Stalin Years, which won the American Historical Association's 1997 George L. Beer Prize.

== Selected bibliography ==
- The Czechs Under Nazi Rule: The Failure of National Resistance 1939-1942. Columbia University Press, 1971.
- Russia's Road to the Cold War, (1979)
- The Cold War and Soviet Insecurity: the Stalin years (1996)
- Mastny, Vojtech (2004). "Superpower Détente: US-Soviet relations, 1969–1972" (PDF). Bulletin of the German Historical Institute. Supplement 1: 19–25.
- A Cardboard Castle and inside History of the Warsaw pact 1955-1991 (2005)
- Turkey Between East And West: New Challenges For A Rising Regional Power (2019)
