= Battle of Arras =

The name Battle of Arras refers to a number of battles which took place near the town of Arras in Artois, France:

- Siege of Arras (1640), a siege by the French against the Spanish during the Thirty Years' War
- Battle of Arras (1654), a clash between the French and the Spanish
- Battle of Arras (1914), a battle during the Race to the Sea in the First World War
- Battle of Arras (1915), took place on May 9, 1915, during the First World War
- Battle of Arras (1917), a British Empire offensive during the First World War
- Battle of Arras (1918), part of the Hundred Days Offensive
- Battle of Arras (1940), a tank battle during the Battle of France in the Second World War

== See also ==
- Arras (disambiguation)
