= Sodar =

Meteorological instrument

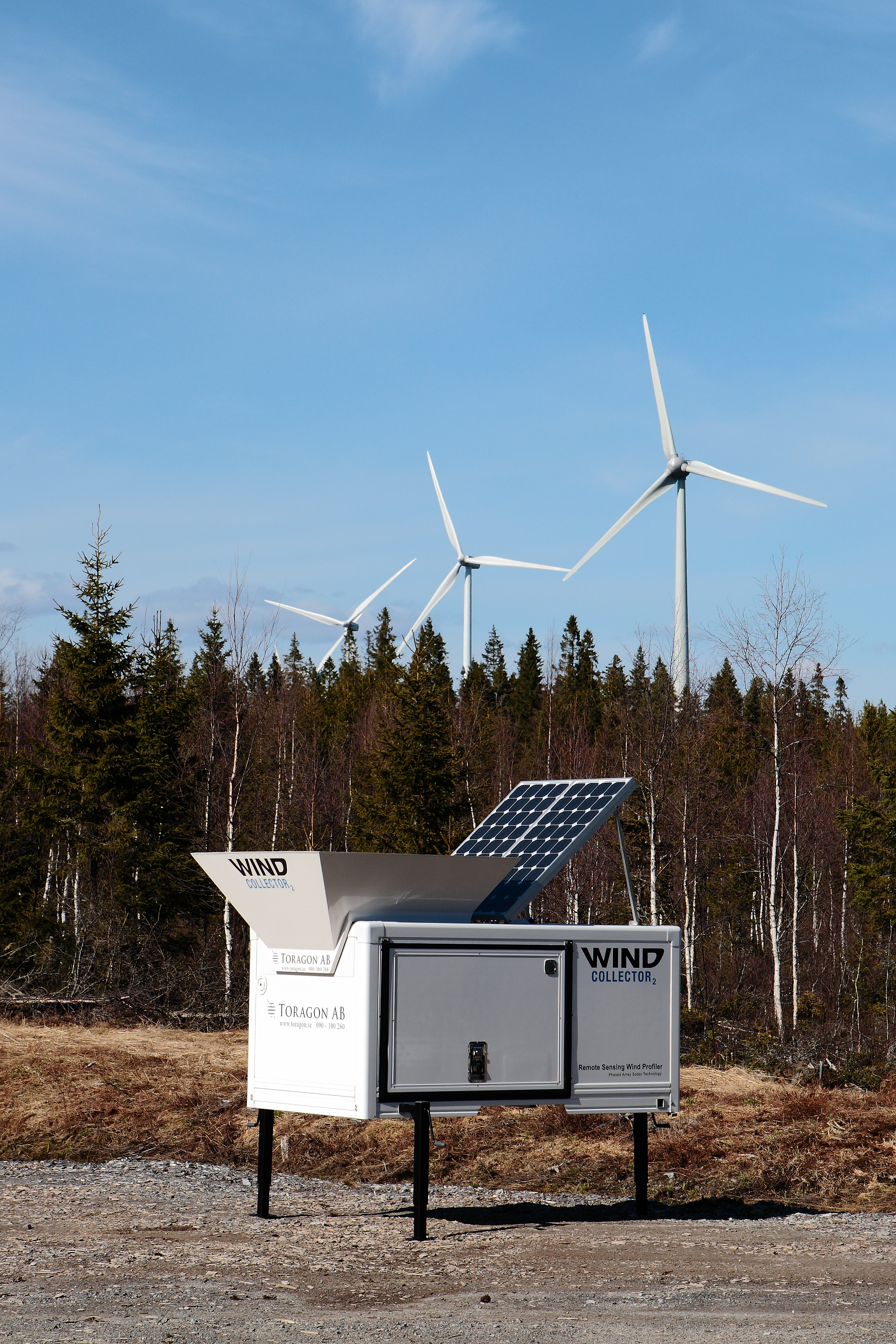
Wind measurement with a Phased Array SODAR

Sodar, an acronym of sonic detection and ranging, is a meteorological instrument used as a wind profiler based on the scattering of sound waves by atmospheric turbulence. Sodar equipment is used to measure wind speed at various heights above the ground, and the thermodynamic structure of the lower layer of the atmosphere.

Sodar systems are in fact nothing more than sonar systems used in the air rather than in water. More specifically, since they operate using the Doppler effect with a multi-beam configuration to determine wind speed, they are the exact in-air equivalent to a subclass of sonar systems known as acoustic Doppler current profilers (ADCP). Other names used for sodar systems include sounder, echosounder and acoustic radar.

== Doppler sodar ==
Commercial sodars operated to collect upper-air wind measurements consist of antennas that transmit and receive acoustic signals. A mono-static system uses the same antenna for transmitting and receiving, while a bi-static system uses separate antennas. The difference between the two antenna systems determines whether atmospheric scattering is by temperature fluctuations (in mono-static systems), or by both temperature and wind velocity fluctuations (in bi-static systems).

Mono-static antenna systems can be divided into two categories: those using multiple axis individual antennas, and those using a single phased array antenna. The multiple-axis systems generally use three individual antennas aimed in specific directions to steer the acoustic beam. Using three independent (i.e. non-collinear) axes is enough to retrieve the three components of the wind speed, although using more axes would add redundancy and increase robustness to noise when estimating the wind speed, using a least-squares approach. One antenna is generally aimed vertically, and the other two are tilted slightly from the vertical at an orthogonal angle. Each of the individual antennas may use a single transducer focused into a parabolic reflector to form a parabolic loudspeaker, or an array of speaker drivers and horns (transducers) all transmitting in-phase to form a single beam. Both the tilt angle from the vertical and the azimuth angle of each antenna are fixed when the system is set up.

Phased-array antenna systems use a single array of speaker drivers and horns (transducers), and the beams are electronically steered by phasing the transducers appropriately. To set up a phased-array antenna, the pointing direction of the array is either level or oriented as specified by the manufacturer.

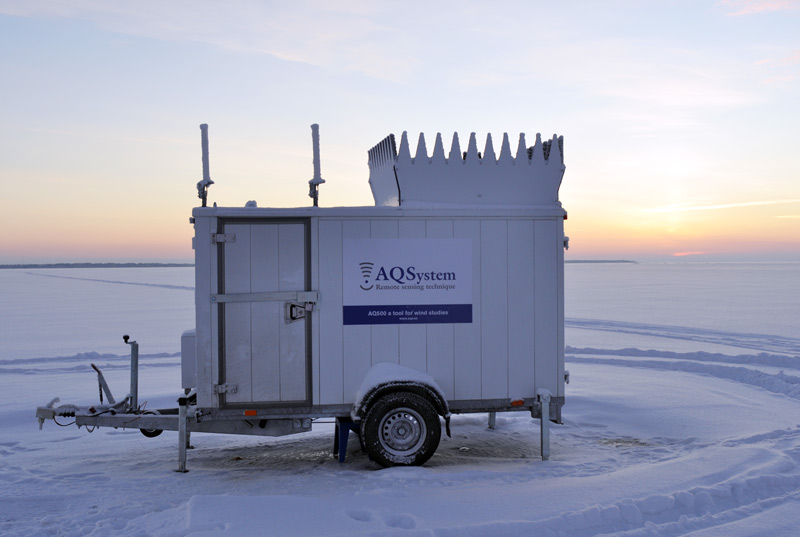
AQ500 SoDAR used in wind energy development and wind condition monitoring.

The horizontal components of the wind velocity are calculated from the radially measured Doppler shifts and the specified tilt angle from the vertical. The tilt angle, or zenith angle, is generally 15 to 30 degrees, and the horizontal beams are typically oriented at right angles to one another. Since the Doppler shift of the radial components along the tilted beams includes the influence of both the horizontal and vertical components of the wind, a correction for the vertical velocity is needed in systems with zenith angles less than 20 degrees. Also, if the system is located in a region where vertical velocities may be greater than about 0.2 m/s, corrections for the vertical velocity are needed, regardless of the beam's zenith angle.

The vertical range of sodars is approximately 0.2 to 2 kilometers (km) and is a function of frequency, power output, atmospheric stability, turbulence, and, most importantly, the noise environment in which a sodar is operated. Operating frequencies range from less than 1000 Hz to over 4000 Hz, with power levels up to several hundred watts. Due to the attenuation characteristics of the atmosphere, high power, lower frequency sodars will generally produce greater height coverage. Some sodars can be operated in different modes to better match vertical resolution and range to the application. This is accomplished through a relaxation between pulse length and maximum altitude.

== Sodar applications ==
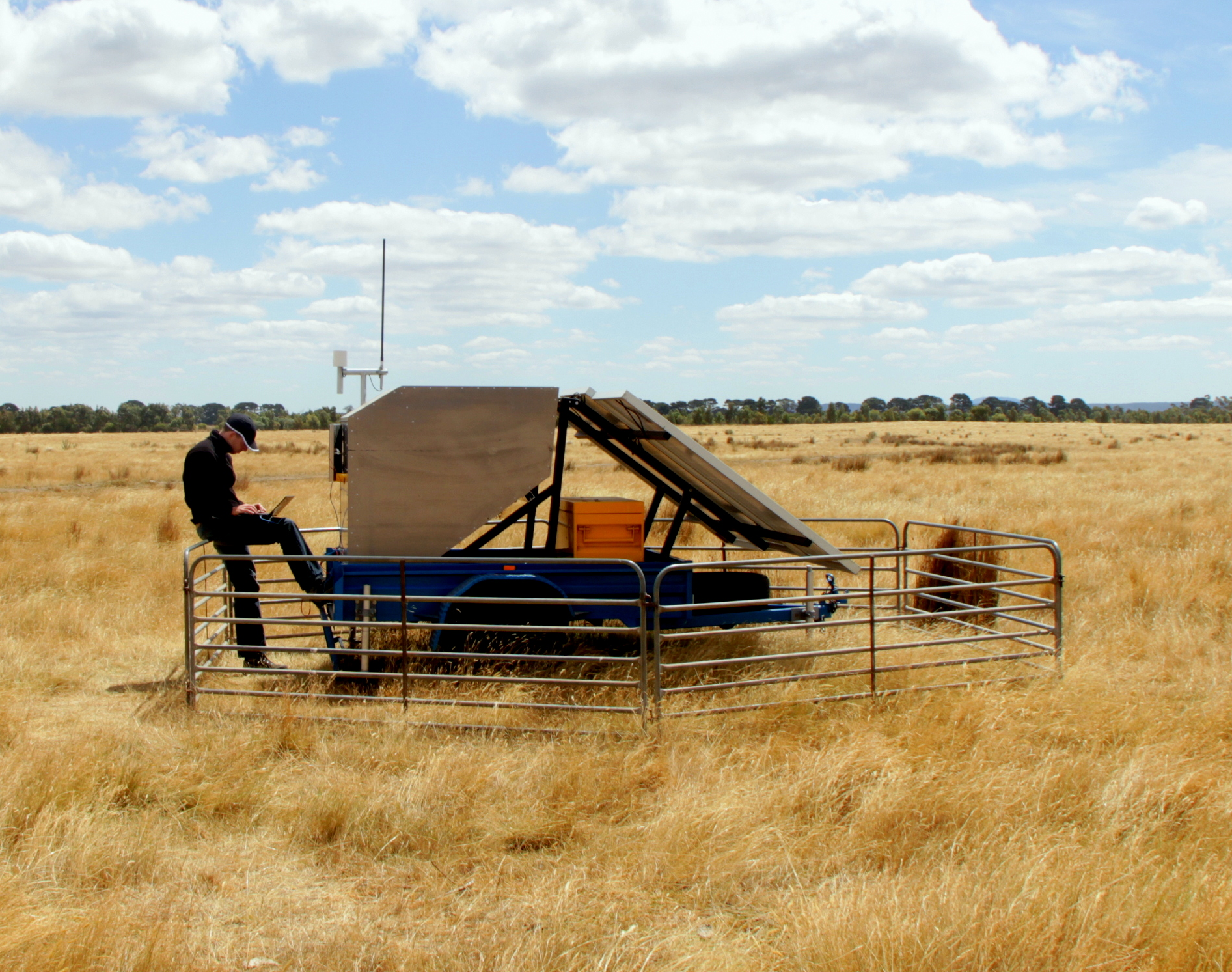
Wind monitoring using the Fulcrum3D Sodar

Traditionally used in atmospheric research, sodars are now being applied as an alternative to traditional wind monitoring for the development of wind power projects. Sodars used for wind power applications are typically focused on a measurement range from 50m to 200m above ground level, corresponding to the size of modern wind turbines. Some sodar products, such as the Fulcrum3D FS1 Sodar, REMTECH PA-XS Sodar and the AQ510 Sodar, have been specifically developed for this market.

Compact-beam sodars are more accurate in complex terrain where the wind vector can change across the measurement area of the sodar. By providing a more compact beam angle, these sodars reduce the effect of any change in the wind vector. This provides a more accurate estimate of wind flow and therefore energy production of a wind turbine. Compact beam sodars also reduce the effect of fixed echos and allow a more compact unit design.

Multiple-axis sodars provide the capability for the simultaneous firing of all three sound beams, unlike single-axis sodars which must fire each sound beam sequentially. Simultaneous firing can provide three times the number of sample points in any given period, resulting in a higher signal to noise ratio (SNR), higher data availability and greater accuracy.

Sodars designed for the wind energy industry also differ in important aspects such as the traceability of data as some manufacturers do not return full signal and noise spectrum data from the sodar unit, but rather, only return processed wind speed data. This means the raw data cannot be re-analysed or reprocessed.

== Analogy and differences between sodar and ADCP ==
The underlying physical principles behind the two devices are exactly the same. Both devices use sound waves to remotely determine properties of the environment. Both devices use the Doppler effect to measure radial speeds on at least three non-colinear beams, which after simple computations yield the three vector components of the speed of the transmitting medium (air or water) at different altitudes. Both sodars and Acoustic Doppler Current Profilers (ADCP) can use either separate transducers for each beam or use phased arrays. Finally, both devices may use piezoelectric transducers to produce and receive the sound.

However, the operating frequencies between sodars and ADCPs are typically different. Commercial ADCPs as manufactured e.g. by Teledyne RDI (the de facto leader of this market) typically use carrier frequencies that are in the hundreds of kilohertz range (300 kHz, 600 kHz, 1200 kHz) while sodars transmit only in the low kilohertz range. Transmitting at a higher frequency is possible for ADCPs due to the better sound transmitting qualities of water, and this also benefits to the compacity of the device (a diameter of typically 25 cm / 10" or less for ADCPs). Also, the acoustic impedance of the transducers is not the same, because they do not operate in the same medium: air for sodars, water for ADCPs; said differently, an ADCP would not work in the air, and a sodar would not work underwater. Finally, it is more common for ADCPs to use four beams, even when they are not using a phased array. This has the benefit of adding some form of redundancy, thus making the estimate of the water currents more robust to noise. This is feasible for sodars too, but for the cost of adding a fourth transducer. The operating range of typical ADCPs is less than two hundred meters (this lowers as frequency increases, as in air).

== See also ==
- Radio acoustic sounding system
- Wind power
