= Razzy Dazzy Spasm Band =

Razzy Dazzy Spasm Band may refer to:

- Razzy Dazzy Spasm Band (folk), a 1970s folk/bluegrass band
- Razzy Dazzy Spasm Band (jazz), an 1890s New Orleans jazz band
