= Radio acoustic sounding system =

Atmospheric lapse rate measurement system

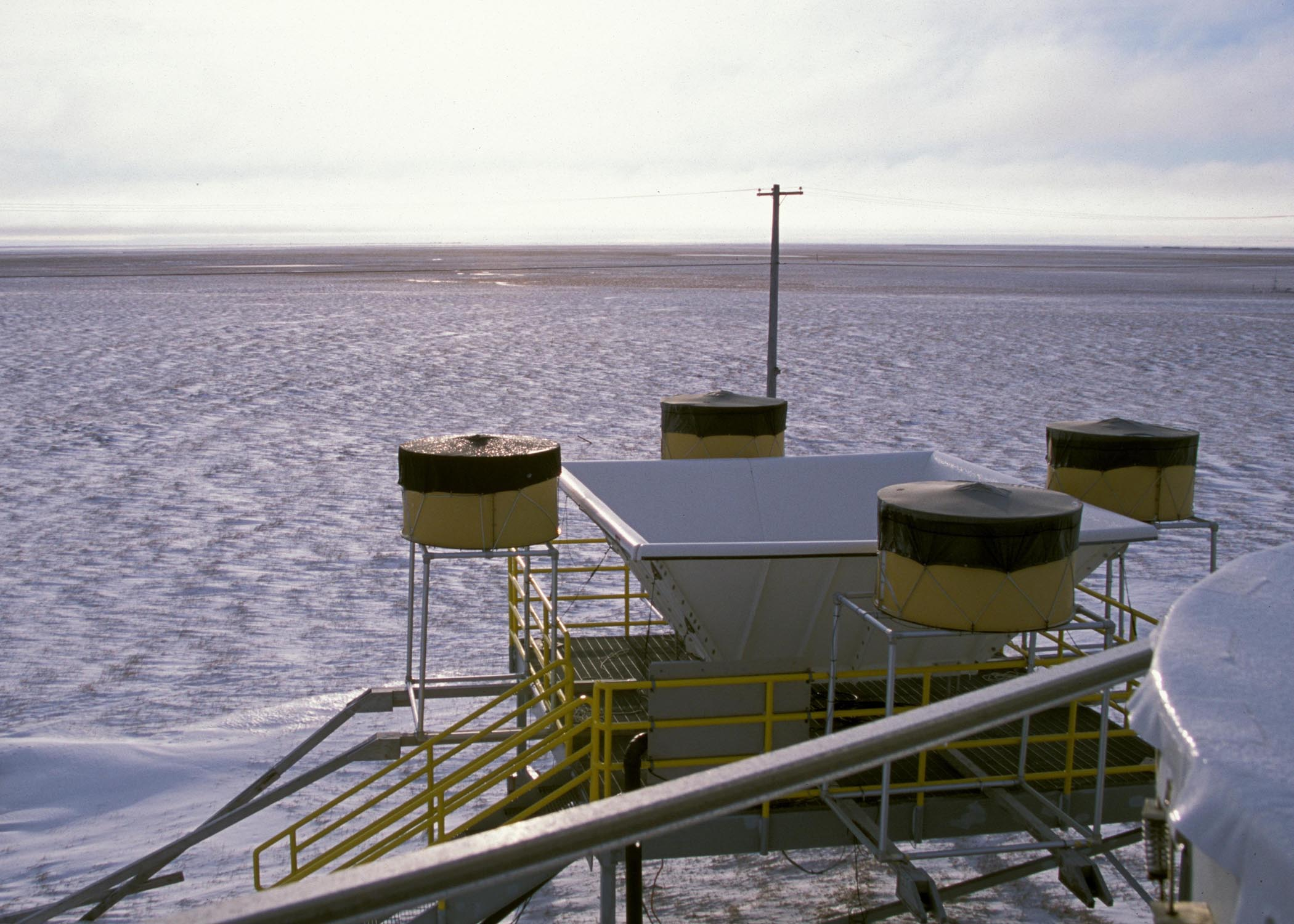
Radar wind profiler and RASS at the Alaska North Slope site in Barrow, Alaska

A radio acoustic sounding system (RASS) is a system for measuring the atmospheric lapse rate using backscattering of radio waves from an acoustic wave front to measure the speed of sound at various heights above the ground. This is possible because the compression and rarefaction of air by an acoustic wave changes the dielectric properties, producing partial reflection of the transmitted radar signal. From the speed of sound, the temperature of the air in the planetary boundary layer can be computed. The maximum altitude range of RASS systems is typically 750 metres (2,460 ft), although observations have been reported up to 1.2 km (3,900 ft) in moist air.

== Principle ==
The principle of operation behind RASS is as follows: Bragg scattering occurs when acoustic energy (i.e., sound) is transmitted into the vertical beam of a radar such that the wavelength of the acoustic signal matches the half-wavelength of the radar. As the frequency of the acoustic signal is varied, strongly enhanced scattering of the radar signal occurs when the Bragg match takes place.

When this occurs, the Doppler shift of the radar signal produced by the Bragg scattering can be determined, as well as the atmospheric vertical velocity. Thus, the speed of sound as a function of altitude can be measured, from which virtual temperature (TV) profiles can be calculated with appropriate corrections for vertical air motion. The virtual temperature of an air parcel is the temperature that dry air would have if its pressure and density were equal to those of a sample of moist air. As a rule of thumb, an atmospheric vertical velocity of 1 m/s (3.3 ft/s) can alter a TV observation by 1.6 °C (2.9 °F).

== Configurations ==
RASS can be added to a radar wind profiler or to a sodar system. In the former case, the necessary acoustic subsystems must be added to the radar wind profiler to generate the sound signals and to perform signal processing. When RASS is added to a radar profiler, three or four vertically pointing acoustic sources (equivalent to high quality stereo loud speakers) are placed around the radar wind profiler's antenna, and electronic subsystems are added that include the acoustic power amplifier and the signal generating circuit boards. The acoustic sources are used only to transmit sound into the vertical beam of the radar, and are usually encased in noise suppression enclosures to minimize nuisance effects that may bother nearby neighbors or others in the vicinity of the instrument.

When RASS is added to a sodar, the necessary radar subsystems are added to transmit and receive the radar signals and to process the radar reflectivity information. Since the wind data are obtained by the sodar, the radar only needs to sample along the vertical axis. The sodar transducers are used to transmit the acoustic signals that produce the Bragg scattering of the radar signals, which allows the speed of sound to be measured by the radar.

== Resolution ==
The vertical resolution of RASS data is determined by the pulse length(s) used by the radar. RASS sampling is usually performed with a 60 to 100 metres (200 to 330 ft) pulse length. Because of atmospheric attenuation of the acoustic signals at the RASS frequencies used by boundary layer radar wind profilers, the altitude range that can be sampled is usually 0.1 to 1.5 kilometres (330 to 4,920 ft), depending on atmospheric conditions (e.g., high wind velocities tend to limit RASS altitude coverage to a few hundred meters because the acoustic signals are blown out of the radar beam).
