= Maison de la paix =

Building in Geneva, Switzerland

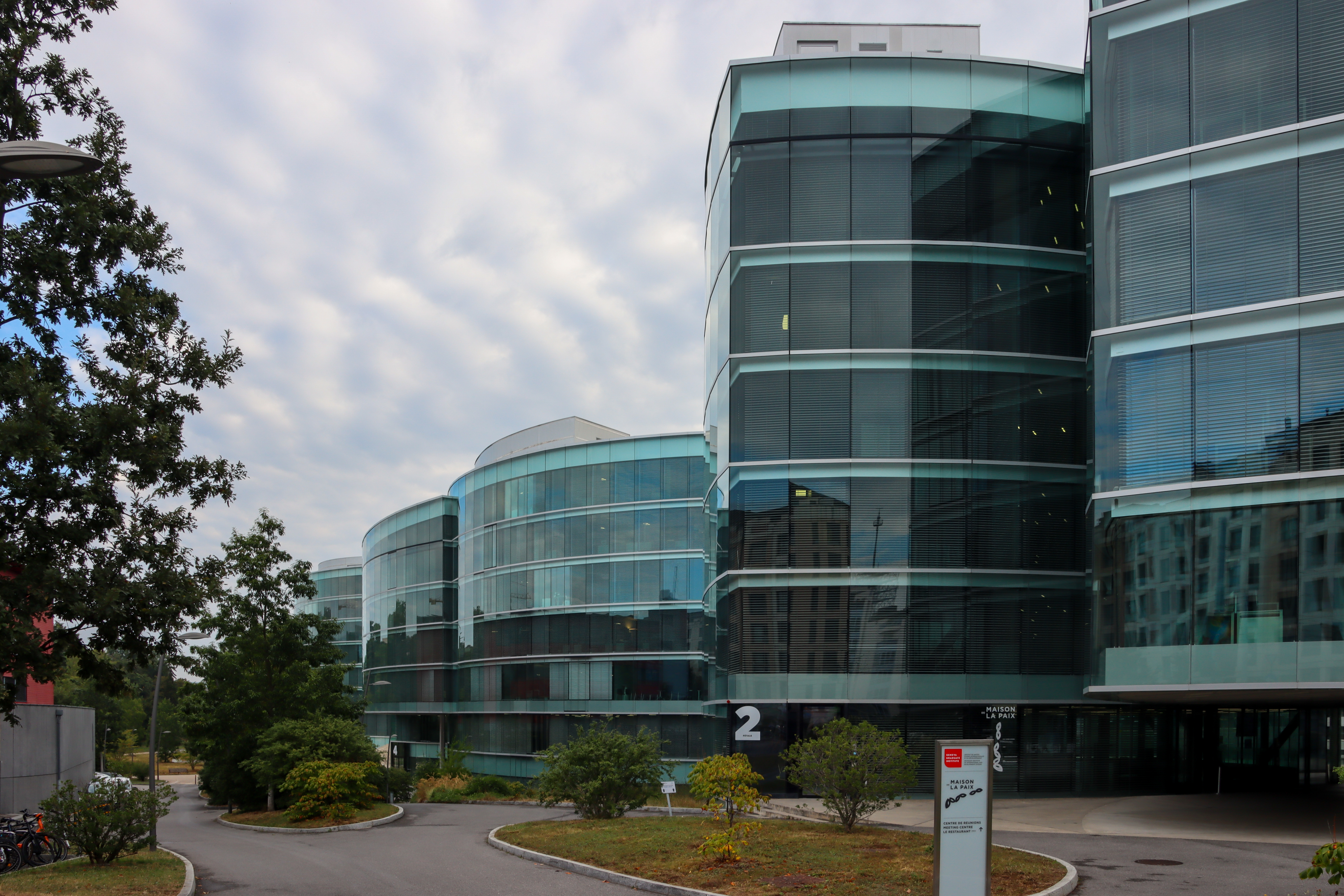
Maison de la paix.

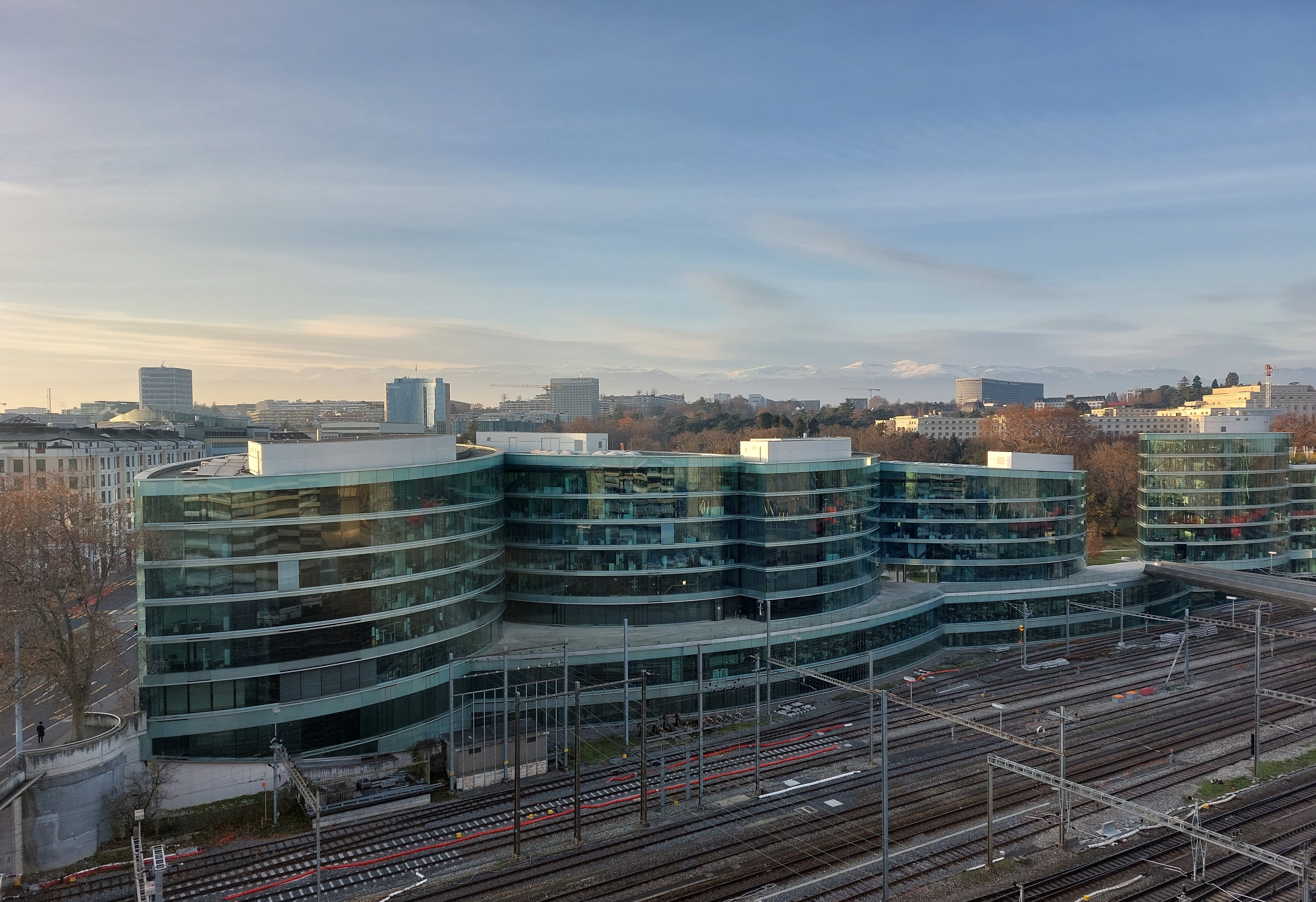
Maison de la paix.

The Maison de la paix (literally: House of Peace) is a building owned by the Graduate Institute of International and Development Studies in Geneva, Switzerland. The building was designed by Eric Ott of Neuchâtel's IPAS firm. It serves as the headquarters for the Graduate Institute and houses the three Geneva Centres, which comprise the Geneva Centre for Security Policy (GCSP), the Geneva International Centre for Humanitarian Demining (GICHD), and the Geneva Centre for the Democratic Control of Armed Forces (DCAF). It is the main element of the Campus de la paix (literally: Campus of Peace).

== Design ==
The Maison de la paix is constructed as a series of interconnected divisions. When seen from above, each division resembles a flower petal. Thus, each section of the building is known as a numbered "petal." The completed project consists of six petals, with petals one and two holding the main activities of the Graduate Institute and petals three through six housing the three Geneva Centres, all of which are supported by the Swiss Confederation as international foundations.

The petal design allows for maximum use of light within the structure. Natural light is used to light and heat the building. Petals one through three have large, open atriums that use skylights to "pull" sunlight from the roof through the center of each petal. These, and other features, help make the Maison de la paix one of the greenest buildings in Suisse Romande at the time of is construction, according to the architect.

== The Graduate Institute at the Maison de la paix ==
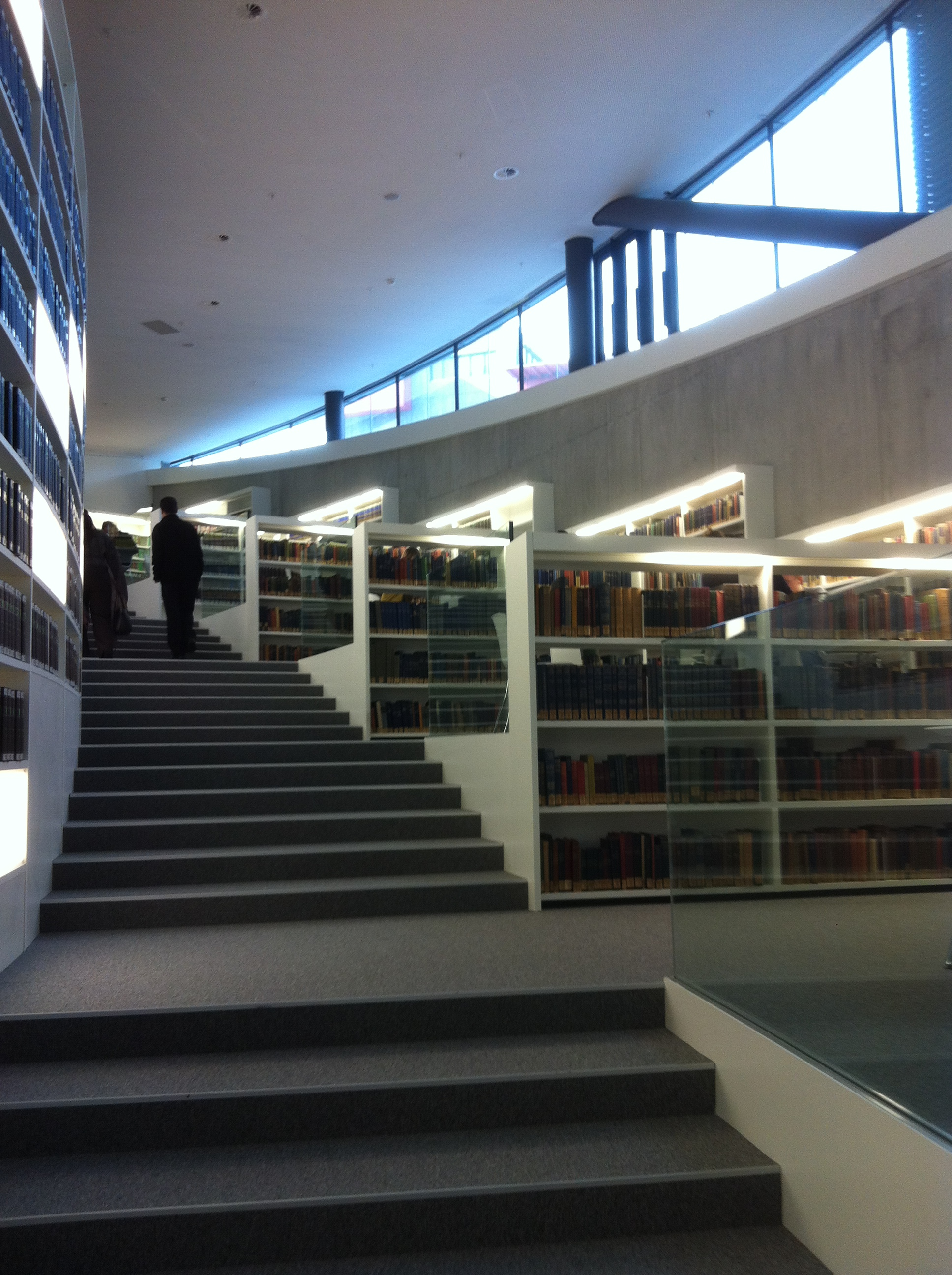
The Davis Library

The first two petals were inaugurated in September 2013 with the annual Opening Lecture given by Kofi Annan, one of the institute's most well-known alumnus. Classes for the Graduate Institute concurrently commenced in the Maison de la paix.

The Maison de la paix houses the classroom space for most of the Graduate Institute's masters and PhD programme courses as well as the office space for its professors and administration.

The Maison de la paix is home to the Davis Library, named after alumna and benefactor Kathryn Wasserman Davis and her husband Shelby Cullom Davis. The library hosts 350,000 physical volumes dedicated to the Graduate Institute's areas of study in international and development studies.

== The three Geneva centres ==
Petals three through six host the following centers which work in international peace and security policy:

- The Geneva Centre for Security Policy (GCSP)
- The Geneva International Centre for Humanitarian Demining (GICHD) including the Gender and Mine Action Programme (GMAP)
- The Geneva Centre for the Democratic Control of Armed Forces (DCAF)
