= Respiratory airway secretory cell =

Cell type of the lung

The respiratory airway secretory cell (RAS), is found in the lungs of humans and some other mammals, notably ferrets. They are facultative progenitors that have important functional roles in maintaining lung airway health. Their role in maintaining the gas-exchange compartment of the lung is critical and they may be altered in chronic lung disease.

== Function ==
RAS cells secrete molecules that maintain the fluid lining along bronchioles, which helps to prevent the tiny airways from collapsing. This maximizes the efficiency of the lungs.

The cells also act as progenitor cells for alveolar type 2 (AT2) cells, which are a special type of alveoli that secrete a chemical used, in part, to repair other damaged alveoli.
