= Heba Aly (journalist) =

Canadian and Egyptian journalist and news executive

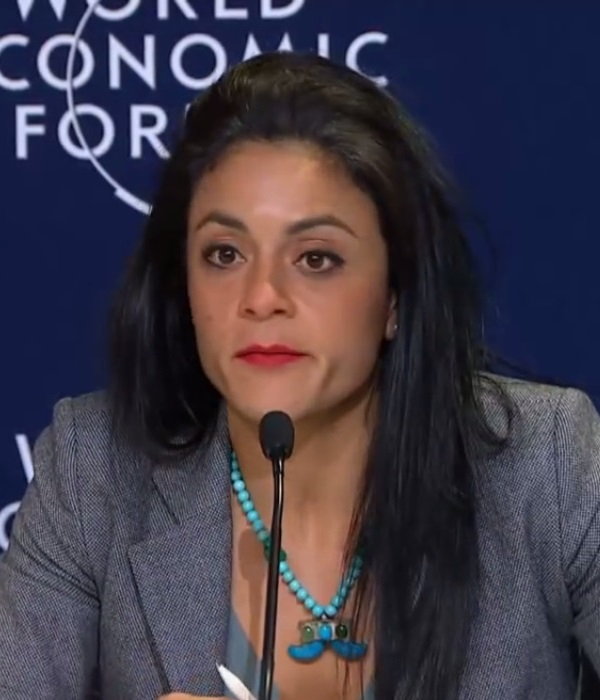
- Born: 1983; Ottawa
- Education: Carleton University
- Occupation: Journalist
- Employers: Article 109 Coalition; The New Humanitarian

Heba Aly is a Canadian and Egyptian journalist and non-profit executive, who is director of the Article 109 coalition, formerly known as the UN Charter Reform Coalition. She was chief executive officer of the independent, non-profit news agency The New Humanitarian, formerly a project of the United Nations Office for the Coordination of Humanitarian Affairs (OCHA) known as Integrated Regional Information Networks (IRIN). She led the transition of the news agency into its current status as an independent organization, which focuses on conflict journalism, especially in Africa.

Aly was named a 2018 Young Global Leader by the World Economic Forum. Her public leadership work involves advocating for quality news coverage of conflict areas and humanitarian work. She has been a speaker at TEDxChamonix and at PeaceTalks.

== Early life ==
Aly was born in Ottawa, Canada. She graduated with highest honors and B.S. degrees in journalism and human rights from Carleton University.

== Career ==
Aly spent her early career reporting from conflict zones in the Middle East, Africa and Central Asia. While a working journalist, she focused on reporting from Senegal, West Africa and Chad, central Africa, covering development and conflict in Niger, child trafficking in Nigeria, riots, and poverty in Senegal and Guinea Bissau, floods in Ghana, and displaced refugees from Chad and Sudan.

Her reporting has appeared on the Canadian Broadcasting Corporation, The Christian Science Monitor, and Bloomberg News. As chief executive, she is a frequent commentator and speaker on humanitarian policy at government briefings and conferences.

Aly is Director of the Article 109 Coalition, an international civil society organization calling for UN Charter reform.

== Awards and honors ==
Aly received a grant from the Pulitzer Center on Crisis Reporting for work in Sudan from 2008 to 2009.

She was named a 2018 Young Global Leader by the World Economic Forum.

Aly was named one of the 100 Most Influential Africans of 2018 by the New African Magazine.
