= D'Arras =

d'Arras is a French surname. Notable people with the surname include:

- Andrieu Contredit d'Arras (c. 1200 - 1248), French poet
- Gautier d'Arras (died c. 1185), French poet
- Jean d'Arras (14th century), French writer
- Moniot d'Arras (13th century), French composer and poet
