= Rez =

Rez or REZ may refer to:

== Entertainment ==
- Rez (video game), a 2001 Japanese rail shooter music video game released by Sega
- The Rez, a 1996-1998 Canadian television drama series
- Rez (Gex), a character in the video game series Gex
- Rez, a character in Spy Kids 3-D: Game Over

=== Music ===
- "Rez" (song), a 1993 non-album track by Underworld in the UK
- Rez Band, also known as simply Rez, a former Christian heavy metal rock group from Chicago

== Native Americans ==
- Rez, slang for an Indian reservation of United States Native Americans
- Rez, slang for an Indian reserve of Canadian First Nations peoples

== People ==
- Rez Abbasi (born 1965), Pakistani-American fusion and jazz guitarist
- Rez Cortez (born 1956), Filipino film and television actor and assistant director
- Rez Gardi, Kurdish New Zealander international lawyer and human rights activist
- Rez Toledo, Filipino singer-songwriter
- Rezz (Isabelle Rezazadeh, born 1995), Canadian musician

== Other uses ==
- Řež, a village in the Czech Republic
- Rez, a resource compiler for the Apple Macintosh, see ResEdit

== See also ==
- Rez dog (or reservation dog), a term for outdoor, stray, and feral dogs living on Indian reservations
- Res (disambiguation)
