= Raz (surname) =

Raz is a surname. Notable people with the name include:

- Adela Raz (born 1986), Afghan politician
- Aviad Raz, Israeli sociologist
- Guy Raz, American radio journalist
- Joseph Raz (1939–2022), legal, moral and political philosopher
- Jozef Ráž (born 1954), Slovak musician
- Jozef Ráž (born 1979), Slovak politician
- Kavi Raz (born 1953), Indian-British actor
- Lihie Raz (born 2003), American-born Israeli Olympic artistic gymnast
- Lior Raz (born 1971), Israeli actor and screenwriter
- Mossi Raz (born 1965), Israeli politician
- Nahman Raz (1924–2015), Israeli politician
- Ran Raz (born 1966), professor of computer science at Princeton University
- Ruhama Raz (born 1955), Israeli singer
