= Protocol on Explosive Remnants of War =

The Protocol on Explosive Remnants of War is an international treaty concluded in Geneva in 2003 that aims to limit the impact of cluster bombs and other unexploded devices on civilian populations after a conflict ends. It is the fifth Protocol to the Convention on Prohibitions or Restrictions on the Use of Certain Conventional Weapons.

The Protocol came into effect on 12 November 2006. As of May 2024, there are 98 state parties to the agreement.
