= Thomas Greminger =

Swiss diplomat (born 1961)

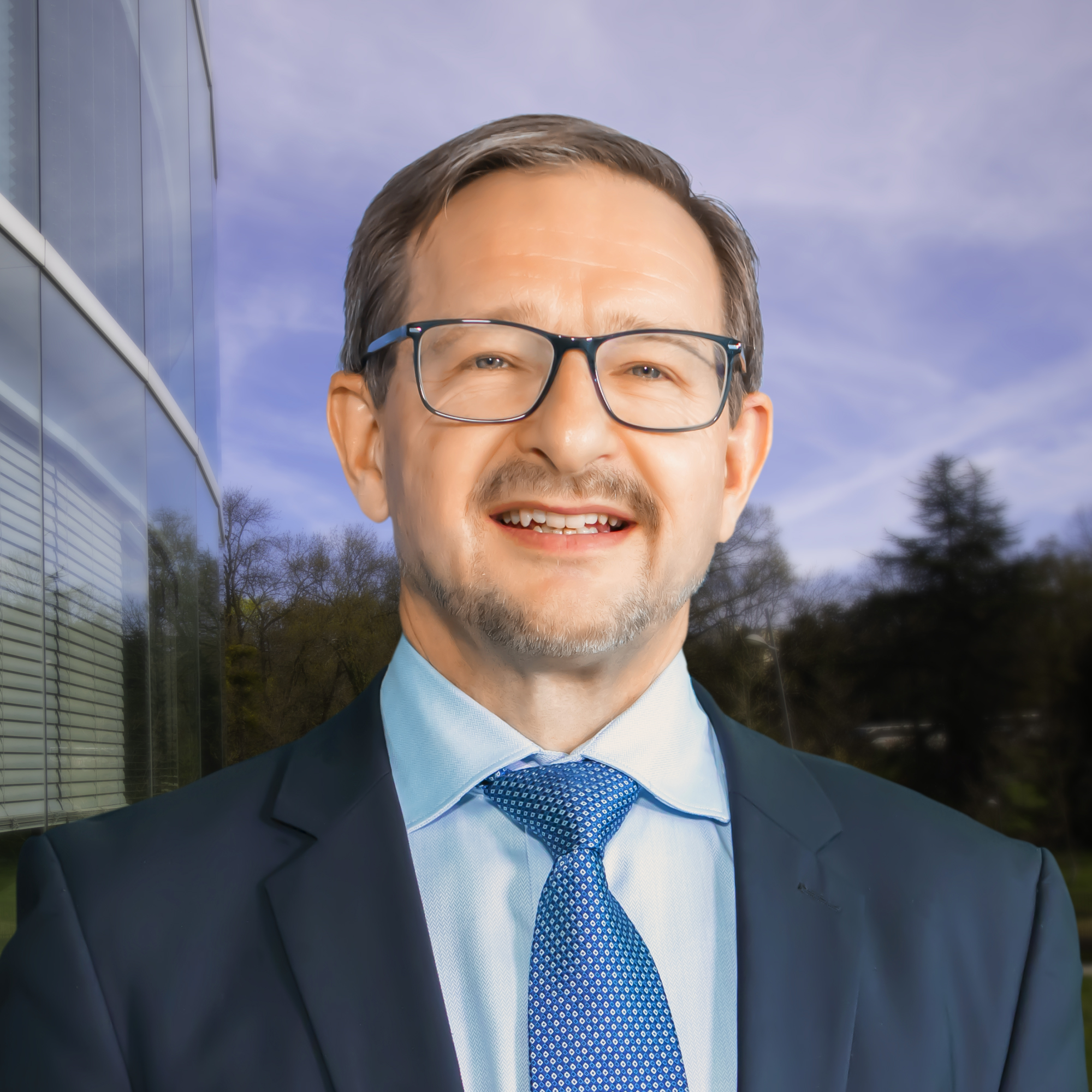
- Greminger in 2024
- Born: 22 April 1961 (age 65); Lucerne, Switzerland
- Occupation: Diplomat
- Known for: Former Secretary-general for the Organization for Security and Co-operation in Europe (OSCE)

Thomas Greminger (born 22 April 1961) is a Swiss diplomat. He served as Secretary-General for the Organization for Security and Co-operation in Europe (OSCE) from July 2017 to July 2020. Since May 2021, he has been the Director of the Geneva Centre for Security Policy (GCSP). He is a general staff officer in the Swiss army (lieutenant colonel).

== Education ==
Thomas Greminger studied history, economics, and political science at the University of Zurich, completing his studies with a doctorate in history with the dissertation Ordnungs-Truppen in Zürich. Der Einsatz von Armee, Polizei und Stadtwehr, Ende November 1918 bis August 1919.

== Diplomatic career ==
In 1990, Greminger joined the diplomatic service of the Federal Department of Foreign Affairs (FDFA). After his posts in Bern, Tel Aviv, and Geneva, he held various senior positions within the FDFA, both domestically and abroad. Between 1992 and 1998, he was a diplomatic staff member, then deputy section head, and finally section head in the Politics and Research section of the Swiss Agency for Cooperation and Development (SDC).

From 1999 to 2001, Greminger was the coordinator of Swiss development cooperation and acting chargé d'affaires at the Swiss Embassy in Maputo, Mozambique. From 2002 to 2004, he served as deputy head of the Human Security Division and head of the Peace Policy Section. He then became the head of the Human Security Division and was simultaneously appointed Ambassador. He led the competence center for peace, human rights, humanitarian, and migration policy from 2004 to 2010.

From 2010, Greminger was the Swiss ambassador to the OSCE, the United Nations, and international organizations in Vienna. During Switzerland's OSCE chairmanship in 2014, he chaired the OSCE Permanent Council and played a key role in establishing the observer mission for Ukraine. From August 2015, Greminger was the deputy director and head of the Southern Cooperation Division of DEZA in Bern, responsible for a budget of 730 million USD and 900 staff members in Bern and abroad.

On 11 July 2017, Greminger was designated as the Secretary-General of the OSCE, succeeding Lamberto Zannier. He was officially confirmed on 18 July 2017, for a three-year term. His term could have been extended once for another three years. Greminger was selected over four other candidates: Štefan Füle (Czech Republic), Erlan Idrissov (Kazakhstan), Alena Kupchyna (Belarus), and Ilkka Kanerva (Finland). The Secretary-General is the deputy of the annually rotating OSCE chairman and the administrative head of the OSCE and its secretariat.

In July 2020, Greminger's re-election was blocked, along with Harlem Désir (France), Representative on Freedom of the Media, Ingibjörg Sólrún Gísladóttir (Iceland), Director of the Office for Democratic Institutions and Human Rights (ODIHR), and Lamberto Zannier (Italy), High Commissioner on National Minorities. Azerbaijan, supported by Tajikistan, blocked the extension of Désir's mandate due to his "excessive criticism" of the media situation in Azerbaijan. Tajikistan and Turkey also blocked the extension of Gísladóttir's term. France, Iceland, Canada, and Norway insisted on re-electing all four officials as a package, which led to the blocking of Greminger and Zannier's re-elections as well. Helga Maria Schmid (Germany) was elected as Greminger's successor in December 2020. Matteo Mecacci (Italy) succeeded Gísladóttir, Teresa Ribeiro (Portugal) succeeded Désir, and Kairat Abdrachmanow (Kazakhstan) succeeded Zannier.

Since 1 May 2021, Thomas Greminger has been the Executive Director of the Geneva Centre for Security Policy (GCSP). In this role, he promotes dialogue and cooperation on security policy issues and leads various initiatives and programs aimed at fostering peace and security. His focus includes enhancing the GCSP's research and analysis capabilities and the establishment of informal dialogue platforms at regional and global levels. Examples include dialogues on geopolitical questions and strategic stability, particularly nuclear risks, as well as discussions between American and Russian experts on the Syrian conflict. Another focus is the war in Ukraine and the future of European security. This involves thematic issues, but also channels of communication between the parties to the conflict. A dialogue platform also deals with the current and future challenges facing the OSCE. Additionally, there are regional initiatives addressing security challenges in states outside NATO and the EU, such as conflict resolution in the Mediterranean and questions on co-operation in the Arctic.

Thomas Greminger chairs two boards of trustees of civil society organisations active in the field of peacebuilding (PeaceNexus; Geneva Peacebuilding Platform).

== Personal life ==
Greminger grew up in Adliswil, lives in Nyon, and has four daughters. He speaks German, English, French, and Portuguese. His hobbies include mountain biking, modern and classical music, and photography.

== Awards ==
- 2012: OSCE White Ribbon for his long-standing efforts towards gender equality

== Selected publications ==
- Ordnungstruppen in Zürich. Der Einsatz von Armee, Polizei und Stadtwehr, Ende November 1918 bis August 1919. Helbing & Lichtenhahn, Basel/Frankfurt a. M. 1990, ISBN 978-3-7190-1155-0 (zugleich Dissertation Universität Zürich).
- mit Peter Stutz: Die Felddivision 7. Rückblick auf die letzten zwei Jahrzehnte. Appenzeller Verlag, Herisau 2003, ISBN 978-3-85882-362-5.
- Frieden: eine andere Welt ist möglich. Verlag Neue Zürcher Zeitung, Zürich 2003.
- Am selben Strick in der Friedenspolitik. In: Schweiz global. Das Magazin des Departements für auswärtige Angelegenheiten (EDA), Ausgabe 2/2003, S. 14–15.
- mit Raphael Nägeli: Den Frieden nachhaltig sichern. In: ASMZ – Sicherheit Schweiz: Allgemeine Schweizerische Militärzeitschrift. Heft 7/8, 2006.
- Streitkräfte und zivile Akteure in komplexen multilateralen Friedensoperationen. In: Military Power. Revue der Schweizer Armee. Nr. 1, 2007, S. 6–17.
- Applying a sector-wide approach to the health sector: Switzerland's experience in Mozambique in the 1990s in: Case studies: the Role of Switzerland in Global Health Governance (2010).
- Le point de la Suisse sur la médiation et la facilitation francophones en Afrique in: Médiation et facilitation dans l’espace francophone: Théorie et pratique (co-author, 2010).
- Swiss Civilian Peace Promotion: Assessing Policy and Practice (2011).
- Die Entwicklung der zivilen Friedensförderung der Schweiz seit 2006 in: Zivile Friedensförderung der Schweiz (2011).
- AGORA: Human Security – Origins, Power and Potential in Times of Crisis, Considering Ukraine. In: Manfred Nowak und Ursula Werther-Pietsch (Hrsg.): All Human Rights For All. Vienna Guidebook on Peaceful and Inclusive Societies. NWV, Wien 2014, ISBN 978-3-7083-0853-1.
- The 2014 Ukraine Crisis: Curse and Opportunity for the Swiss Chairmanship: Perspectives on the Role of the OSCE in the Ukraine Crisis (2014).
- Vocational Skills Development. Begrüssungsansprache zum Tag der DEZA vor dem 2. Internationalen Kongress über Vocational Education and Training. Winterthur, 20. Juni 2016 (PDF; 284 kB).
- The OSCE: its role in maintaining peace and the rule of law in Europe in: Europa in der Welt (2019).
- Nachhaltiger Frieden, nachhaltige Entwicklung - die Rolle der OSZE in: OSZE-Jahrbuch (2019).
- Sustaining Peace, Sustaining Development - The Role of the OSCE (2020).
- Strengthening Cooperative Security in Difficult Times: Three Years as Secretary General of the OSCE (2017-2020) - a Critical Appraisal in: Multilateralism in Transition: Challenges and Opportunities for the OSCE (2021).
- Für eine effektivere OSZE: Praktische Empfehlungen eines ehemaligen Generalsekretärs in: OSCE Insights (2021).
- The Organization for Security and Cooperation in Europe in: The Oxford Handbook of the International Law of Global Security (2021).
- Die OSZE und COVID-19: Mandatserfüllung trotz Pandemie in: Rundbrief (2021).
- The OSCE Moscow Mechanism - relevant or obsolete? in: The Defence Horizon Journal (2021).
- The future of Human Security in: Envisioning Peace in a Time of War (2022), ISBN 978-3-7089-2309-3.
- Überwachung, Eindämmung und Bewältigung der Krise in der und um die Ukraine in: Die Ukraine im Krieg - ist Frieden möglich? (2022).
- Einem robusten diplomatischen Prozess den Weg ebnen in: The Art of Diplomacy (2022), ISBN 9783430210713
- The Future of Peace and War: The Geopolitical Lens (2023).
- Cooperative Security in the Future European Security Order GCSP, (2023).
- Perspectives for the War in Ukraine. GCSP, (2024).
- Ideas Notes 2030: Strategic Reflections on the Future of UN Policing. GCSP, (2024).
