= Raz Galleh =

Raz Galleh, Iran رزگله
- Village
- Location within Iran
- Coordinates: 30°16′36″N 55°18′06″E
- Country: Iran
- Province: Kerman
- County: Shahr-e Babak
- Bakhsh: Central
- Rural District: Meymand

Population (2006)
  - Total: 42
- Time zone: UTC+3:30 (IRST)
  - Summer (DST): UTC+4:30 (IRDT)

Raz Galleh (Persian: رزگله; also known as 'Raz Galeh Ābdār) is a village in Meymand Rural District, in the Central District of Shahr-e Babak County, Kerman Province, Iran. At the 2006 census, its population was 42, in 17 families.
