= Wind profiler =

Equipment to measure wind conditions

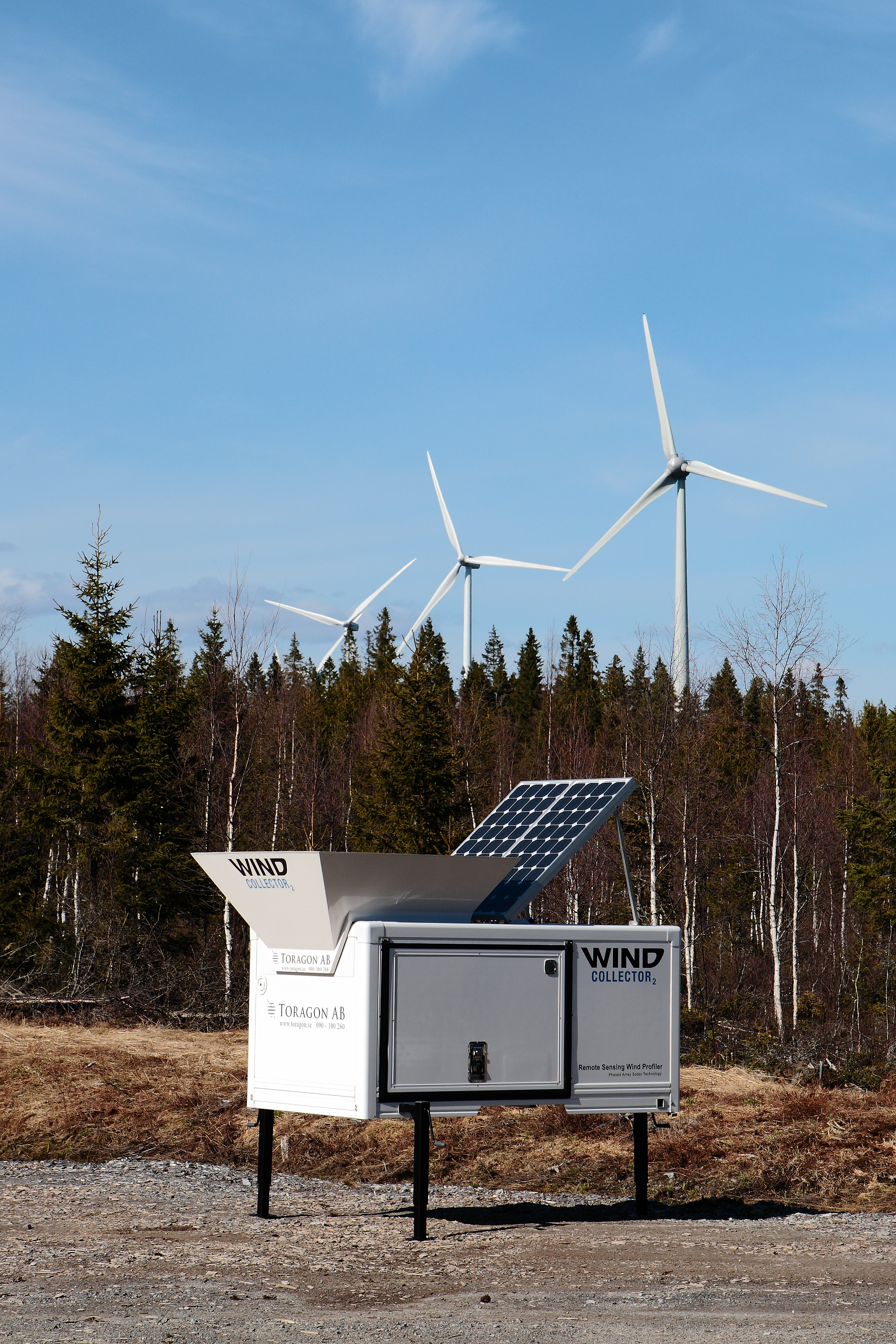
WindCollector2 with a Scintec SODAR SFAS

A wind profiler is a type of weather observing equipment that uses radar, sound waves (SODAR), or lasers (LIDAR) to detect the wind speed and direction at various elevations above the ground. Readings are made at each kilometer above sea level, up to the extent of the troposphere (i.e., between 8 and 17 km above mean sea level). Above this level there is inadequate water vapor present to produce a radar "bounce." The data synthesized from wind direction and speed is very useful to meteorological forecasting and timely reporting for flight planning. A twelve-hour history of data is available through NOAA websites.

== Principle ==
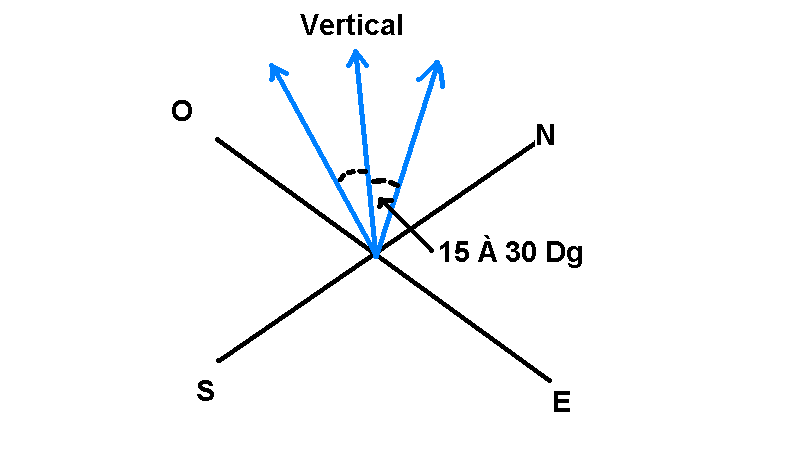
Orientation of the beams in the case of a three tilted wind profiler

In a typical implementation, the radar or sodar can sample along each of five beams: one is aimed vertically to measure vertical velocity, and four are tilted off vertical and oriented orthogonal to one another to measure the horizontal components of the air's motion. A profiler's ability to measure winds is based on the assumption that the turbulent eddies that induce scattering are carried along by the mean wind. The energy scattered by these eddies and received by the profiler is orders of magnitude smaller than the energy transmitted. However, if sufficient samples can be obtained, then the amplitude of the energy scattered by these eddies can be clearly identified above the background noise level, then the mean wind speed and direction within the volume being sampled can be determined. The radial components measured by the tilted beams are the vector sum of the horizontal motion of the air toward or away from the radar and any vertical motion present in the beam. Using appropriate trigonometry, the three-dimensional meteorological velocity components (u, v, w) and wind speed and wind direction are calculated from the radial velocities with corrections for vertical motions.

== Radar wind profiler ==
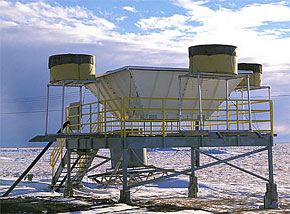
A radar wind profiler surrounded by inverted triangular clutter fence with Sodar system in short cylinders.

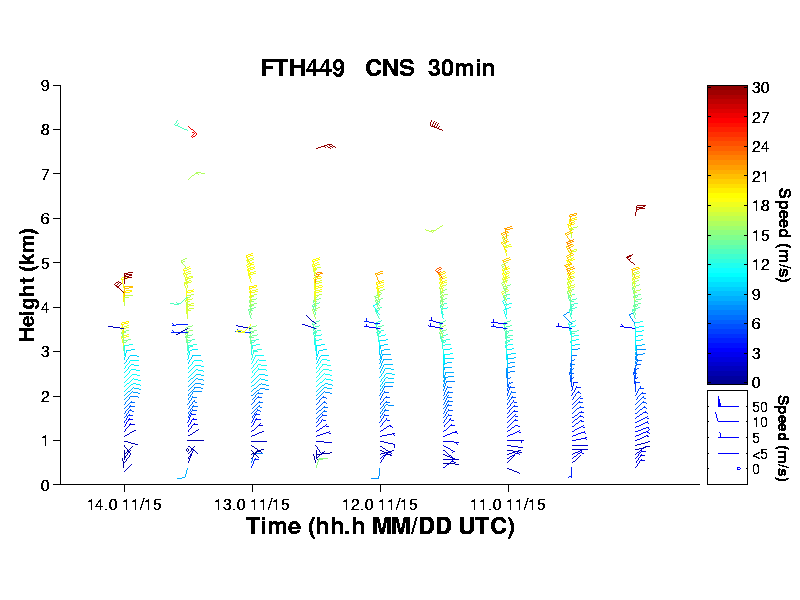
Horizontal plotted wind from a profiler.

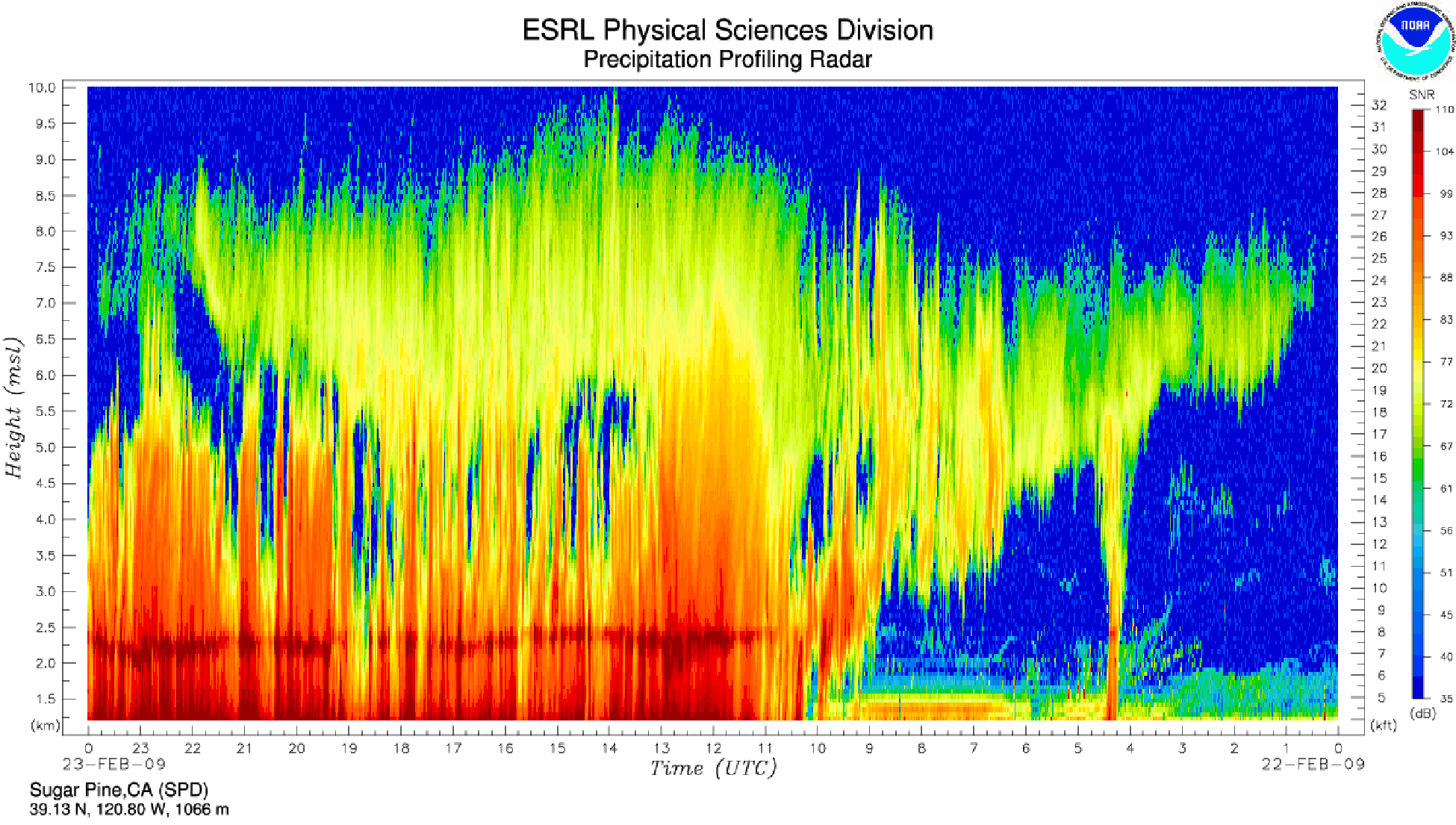
Reflectivity data obtained as a byproduct on a typical radar wind profiler.

Pulse-Doppler radar wind profilers operate using electromagnetic (EM) signals to remotely sense winds aloft. The radar transmits an electromagnetic pulse along each of the antenna's pointing directions. A UHF profiler includes subsystems to control the radar's transmitter, receiver, signal processing, and Radio Acoustic Sounding System (RASS), if provided, as well as data telemetry and remote control.

The duration of the transmission determines the length of the pulse emitted by the antenna, which in turn corresponds to the volume of air illuminated (in electrical terms) by the radar beam. Small amounts of the transmitted energy are scattered back (referred to as backscattering) toward and received by the radar. Delays of fixed intervals are built into the data processing system so that the radar receives scattered energy from discrete altitudes, referred to as range gates. The Doppler frequency shift of the backscattered energy is determined, and then used to calculate the velocity of the air toward or away from the radar along each beam as a function of altitude. The source of the backscattered energy (radar “targets”) is small-scale turbulent fluctuations that induce irregularities in the radio refractive index of the atmosphere. The radar is most sensitive to scattering by turbulent eddies whose spatial scale is ½ the wavelength of the radar, or approximately 16 centimeters (cm) for a UHF profiler.

A boundary-layer radar wind profiler can be configured to compute averaged wind profiles for periods ranging from a few minutes to an hour. Boundary-layer radar wind profilers are often configured to sample in more than one mode. For example, in a “low mode,” the pulse of energy transmitted by the profiler may be 60 m in length. The pulse length determines the depth of the column of air being sampled and thus the vertical resolution of the data. In a “high mode,” the pulse length is increased, usually to 100 m or greater. The longer pulse length means that more energy is being transmitted for each sample, which improves the signal-to-noise ratio (SNR) of the data. Using a longer pulse length increases the depth of the sample volume and thus decreases the vertical resolution in the data. The greater energy output of the high mode increases the maximum altitude to which the radar wind profiler can sample, but at the expense of coarser vertical resolution and an increase in the altitude at which the first winds are measured. When radar wind profilers are operated in multiple modes, the data are often combined into a single overlapping data set to simplify postprocessing and data validation procedures.

Radar wind profilers may also have additional uses, for example in a biological context to complement large-scale bird monitoring schemes.

== Radar precipitation profiler ==
A special case of a radar wind profiler is a vertical precipitation profiler. It consists of a single vertical axis pulse monostatic radar or FMCW Pseudo-monostatic radars. It is used to measure precipitation only. It can be used to identify the melting height of precipitation. These types of radars have been used to study the interactions of different freezing levels and atmospheric rivers on flooding in lowland mountains of the western US.

NOAA PSL FMCW Snow-Level Radar

== Sodar wind profiler ==
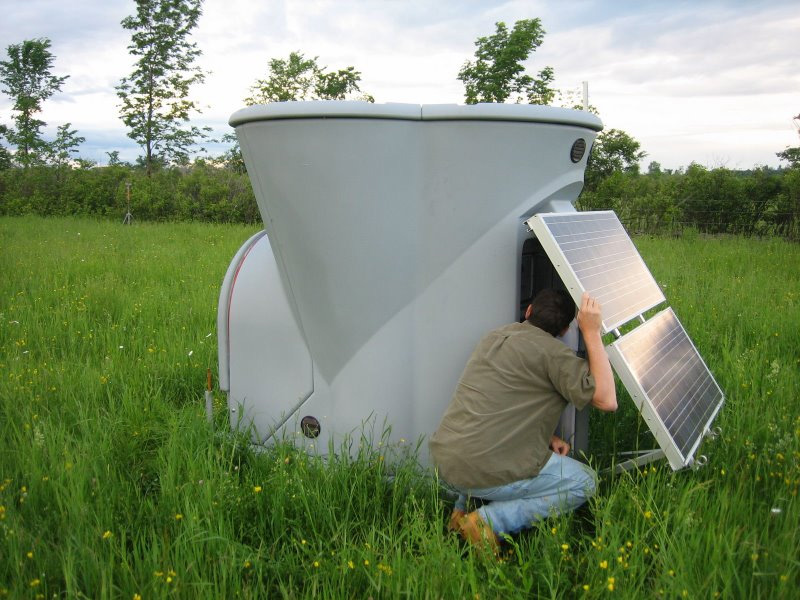
The TRITON transportable SODAR system used to measure wind profiles from Second Wind.

Alternatively, a wind profiler may use sound waves to measure wind speed at various heights above the ground, and the thermodynamic structure of the lower layer of the atmosphere. These sodars can be divided in mono-static system using the same antenna for transmitting and receiving, and bi-static system using separate antennas. The difference between the two antenna systems determines whether atmospheric scattering is by temperature fluctuations (in mono-static systems), or by both temperature and wind velocity fluctuations (in bi-static systems).

Mono-static antenna systems can be divided further into two categories: those using multiple axis, individual antennas and those using a single phased array antenna. The multiple-axis systems generally use three individual antennas aimed in specific directions to steer the acoustic beam. One antenna is generally aimed vertically, and the other two are tilted slightly from the vertical at an orthogonal angle. Each of the individual antennas may use a single transducer focused into a parabolic reflector to form a parabolic loudspeaker, or an array of speaker drivers and horns (transducers) all transmitting in-phase to form a single beam. Both the tilt angle from the vertical and the azimuth angle of each antenna are fixed when the system is set up.

The vertical range of sodars is approximately 0.2 to 2 kilometers (km) and is a function of frequency, power output, atmospheric stability, turbulence, and, most importantly, the noise environment in which a sodar is operated. Operating frequencies range from less than 1000 Hz to over 4000 Hz, with power levels up to several hundred watts. Due to the attenuation characteristics of the atmosphere, high power, lower frequency sodars will generally produce greater height coverage. Some sodars can be operated in different modes to better match vertical resolution and range to the application. This is accomplished through a relaxation between pulse length and maximum altitude.
