= Center for Comparative and International Studies =

Swiss research institute

Coordinates: 47.3805585°N 8.5405656°E

The Center for Comparative and International Studies (CIS) is a political science research institute founded in 1997 and based in Zürich. It is joint initiative between the institute of political science of the University of Zurich and the political science chairs of the Swiss Federal Institute of Technology. The director of the institute is Frank Schimmelfennig, Professor of European Politics. The staff (as of 2016) is 170.

== Research ==
Research at CIS focuses on five themes: democracy, markets and politics, political violence, sustainable development and security studies.

== Teaching ==
CIS offers a specialized joint master's degree program (MACIS). The degree program primarily addresses students who are interested in an academic career, but many also pursue an employment as a research associate in the public or private sector. The Masters Program comprises 120 ECTS credit points, and is meant to be accomplished within four semesters of studying. There is an emphasis on methodological training. Teaching also includes research seminars in the fields of democracy, political economy, political violence, security studies and sustainable development.
