= DCAF =

Security sector research foundation based in Geneva, Switzerland

Coordinates: 46.220787°N 6.143574°E

DCAF - Geneva Centre for Security Sector Governance
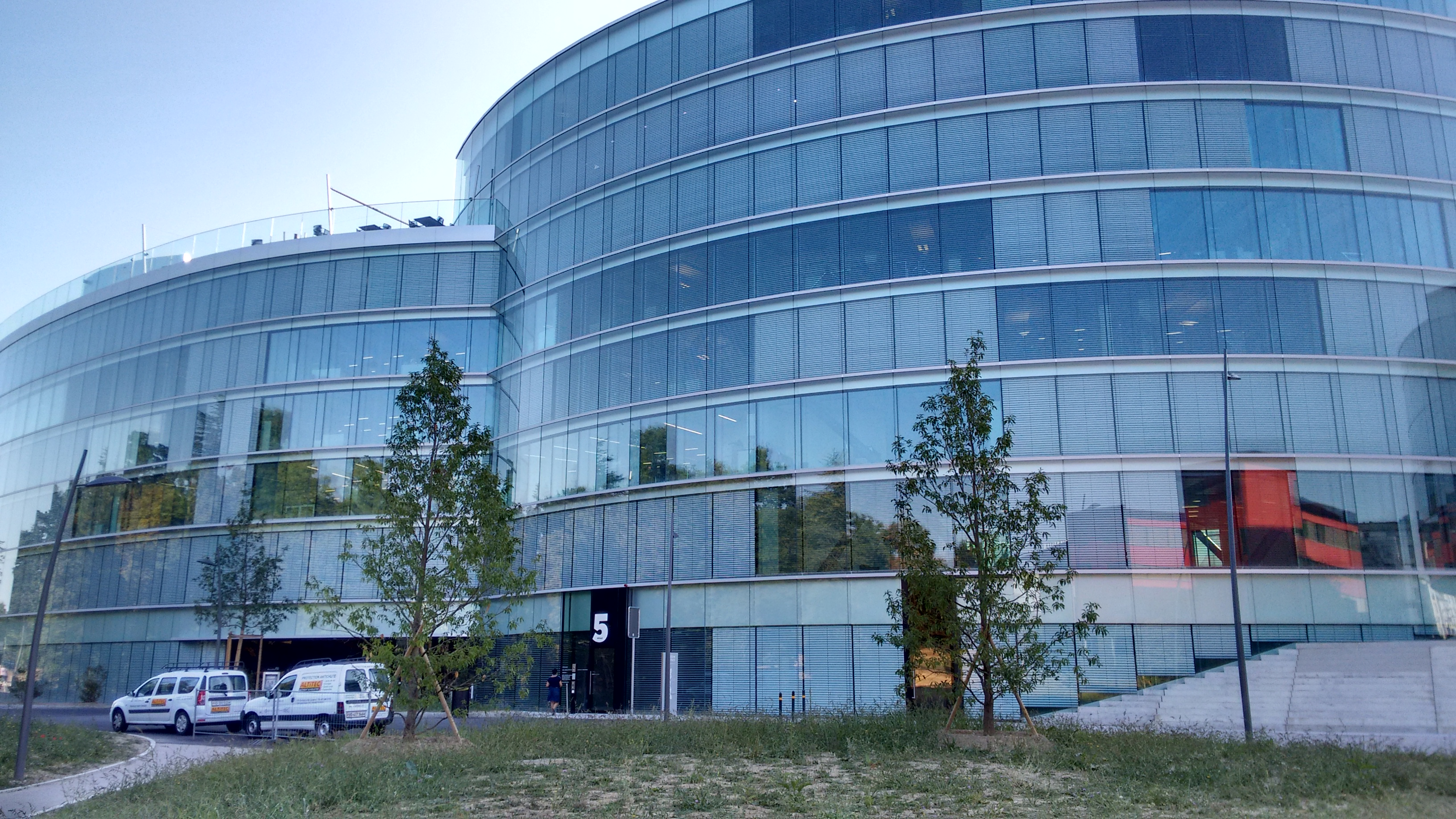
- DCAF headquarters at Maison de la Paix, Geneva
- Founded: October 2000; 26 years ago
- Type: Foundation under Swiss law
- Headquarters: Maison de la Paix; Geneva, Switzerland
- Offices: Addis Ababa, Bamako, Banjul, Beirut, Brussels, Kyiv, Ljubljana, Niamey, Ramallah, Skopje, Tegucigalpa, Tripoli, Tunis
- Member States: 54 states and the Canton of Geneva (2020)
- Director: Ambassador Nathalie Chuard
- Staff: 220 (2023)
- Web Address: dcaf.ch
- Budget: 32 million CHF (2020)

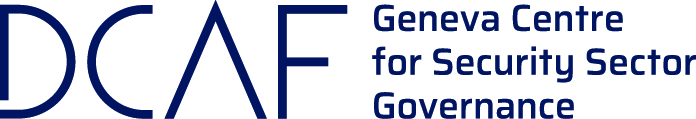
DCAF logo (as of 2019)

DCAF - /ˈdiˌkæf/; Geneva Centre for Security Sector Governance (French: Centre pour la gouvernance du secteur de la sécurité, Genève, German: Das Genfer Zentrum für die Gouvernanz des Sicherheitssektors) is an intergovernmental foundation-based think tank that provides research and project support to states and international actors in improving security sector governance and reform (SSG and SSR).

DCAF was established in 2000 as the 'Geneva Centre for the Democratic Control of Armed Forces' in the Canton of Geneva by the Swiss government and as of 2023 employs around 220 staff in 16 offices.

The Centre's founding mandate was to assist security institutions to reform themselves in ways that would help stabilize the fragile peace following the 1990s Balkans conflicts and during the democratic transitions of Central and Eastern Europe. At the time, ‘democratic control of armed and security forces' was considered a keystone of lasting peace and stability, under the OSCE's 1994 Code of Conduct on politico-military aspects of security.

The Centre was renamed 'DCAF – Geneva Centre for Security Sector Governance' on 2 May 2019, and took on new branding.

== Mandate ==
DCAF was established in October 2000 under Swiss law as a foundation and on the initiative of the Swiss government. The organization states that it is a good governance-promoting foundation focusing on a specific public sector area—the security sector. DCAF is mandated by its intergovernmental Foundation Council to assist partner states and international actors in improving the governance of the security sector through reform based on international norms and good practices.

== Activities ==
DCAF states that it provides in‐country advisory support and practical assistance programmes, identifies recommendations and good practices, develops and promotes norms and standards, and conducts tailored policy research. The think tank reports that it collaborates with international organizations, such as the United Nations, NATO, the African Union, the Organization for Security and Co-operation in Europe (OSCE) and the European Union (EU).

DCAF was ranked the 33rd (out of 65) in the Top Transparency and Good Governance Think Tanks and the 35th (out of 104) in the Top Defense and National Security Think Tanks on the 2017 Global Go To Think Tank Index The foundation is one of only seven institutions worldwide represented in both categories. Likewise, an external evaluation published in 2014 assessed that DCAF "has an excellent reputation as an organization with solid expertise".

== Infrastructure, staff and budget ==
DCAF is headquartered at the Maison de la Paix complex in Geneva together with its "sister centres", the Geneva International Centre for Humanitarian Demining (GICHD) and the Geneva Centre for Security Policy (GCSP), as well as the Graduate Institute of International and Development Studies (IHEID) and other peacebuilding-related institutions. In January 2018, DCAF became a member of the Geneva Peacebuilding Platform (GPP), a "a knowledge hub that connects the critical mass of peacebuilding actors, resources, and expertise in Geneva and worldwide". DCAF also maintains permanent offices in Beirut, Brussels, Ljubljana, Ramallah, Tripoli, and Tunis.

In 2023, DCAF employed 220 staff, of whom 60% were women, from 40 different nationalities. Its budget was 34 million Swiss francs. Switzerland provided approximately 66% of the budget and DCAF's top donors in descending order are currently: Switzerland, Germany, Netherlands, United Kingdom, Sweden, Denmark, Norway, European Union, Luxembourg, Ireland. All funding to DCAF qualifies as official development assistance.

== Organization ==
The Foundation Council is DCAF's supreme decision-making body. As of 2023 it comprises 54 states and the Canton of Geneva as well as four governments and two international organizations that hold observer status. DCAF is organized as a think-and-do tank and at the headquarters its work is carried out according to four pillars:

- Policy & Research Department
  - Policy & Research Division
  - Gender & Security Division
  - Business & Security Division
- Operations Department
  - Europe & Central Asia Division
  - Middle East & North Africa Division
  - Sub-Saharan Africa Division
  - Asia-Pacific Unit
  - Latin America & Caribbean Unit
- International Security Sector Advisory Team (ISSAT)
- Resources Department
  - Financial Resources
  - Human Resources
  - Administration & Support Services

== See also ==
- Advocacy
- Gender and security sector reform
- Foreign relations of Switzerland
- International development
- List of think tanks
- Peace and conflict studies
