= Reusable Asset Specification =

Reusable Asset Specification is an Object Management Group standard to package digital artifacts.

The specification is a set of guidelines and recommendations about the structure, content, and descriptions of reusable software assets. The main purpose of RAS is to increase the reusability of the software assets by encouraging reliable consistent and standard packaging.
