= RE5 (disambiguation) =

Resident Evil 5 is a 2009 video game.

RE5 may also refer to:

- Resident Evil: Retribution, the fifth film in the franchise
- Suzuki RE5, the 1970s motorcycle
- Rhein-Express (RE 5 (RRX)), a Regional-Express rail service in the German state of North Rhine-Westphalia
