= Al Ras =

Al Ras, Ar Rass, or variants thereof, may refer to:

- Ar Rass (الرس), a city in central Saudi Arabia
- Al Rass, Bareq (الرص), a neighborhood in southwestern Saudi Arabia
- Al Ras, Dubai (اَلـرَّأْس), a locality in Dubai, UAE
  - Al Ras (Dubai Metro), a station
- Al-Ras, Tulkarm (الرأس), a Palestinian village in the West Bank
- Al-Ras al-Ahmar (الرأس الأحمر), a former Palestinian village near Safad
- Ras Karkar, also known as Er-Ras, a Palestinian village near Ramallah
- Aras (river), known in Arabic as al-Rass, a river in the Caucasus
- People of Ar-Rass (أصحاب الرس), a legendary community mentioned in the Qur'an
- Al-ras (drum), a drum used in Qatar and the UAE
