= International Relations and Security Network =

Online information service

The International Relations and Security Network (ISN) was part of the Center for Security Studies (CSS) at the Swiss Federal Institute of Technology, which is located in Zürich, Switzerland. It was an online information service that provided a range of open access products and resources that concentrated on international relations (IR) and security studies. In 2016, the ISN ceased to be a stand-alone project and was fully integrated into its parent organization as CSS Resources.

== Overview ==
The ISN was established in 1994 as a means of improving cooperation between security policy institutes and to make research programs, projects and papers widely available on the internet. It was initially sponsored by the Federal Department of Defence, Civil Protection and Sports, the Swiss Federal Department of Foreign Affairs, the German Institute for International and Security Affairs, the United Nations Institute for Disarmament Research and the Center for Security Studies.

Its mission developed to promote dialogue and cooperation in the fields of international relations and security studies, primarily by creating, distributing and processing open access information on these issues. The ISN was also a co-organizer of the Swiss-sponsored International Security Forum (ISF), which is a large conference held every two years in Geneva and Zürich on a rotating basis.

== Directors ==
- Kurt R. Spillmann (1994–2002)
- Andreas Wenger (2002–2016)

== Activities ==
The ISN's web-based, information-providing activities and services were divided into three main categories.

- Digital Library – The ISN's Digital Library began as a repository of declassified Cold War documents and conference proceedings relevant to PfP countries. Prior to the end of the project, the library contained over 70,000 downloadable publications including journal articles, books, working papers and government reports. The Digital Library also included an archive of web articles, blog posts, podcasts and videos as well as a directory of international organizations, NGOs, research institutes and other organizations active in the field of international relations and security.
- Editorial Products – In cooperation with its partner network, the ISN published daily expert analyses, commentaries and blog posts as well as regular multimedia features on current IR- and security-related issues. It also provided Dossiers on a range of topics relevant to the international relations and security community.
- Communities and Partners – The ISN provided an online knowledge network of 249 partner institutions and affiliates, consisting of international organizations (IOs), non-governmental organizations (NGOs), state ministries, think tanks, universities and research institutes.
