= Richmond Agitation-Sedation Scale =

Medical scale used to measure agitation and sedation

- Purpose: Determine level of agitation or sedation

Richmond Agitation-Sedation Scale (RASS) is a medical scale used to measure the agitation or sedation level of a person. It was developed with efforts of different practitioners, represented by physicians, nurses and pharmacists.

The RASS can be used in all hospitalized patients to describe their level of alertness or agitation. It is however mostly used in mechanically ventilated patients in order to avoid over and under-sedation. Obtaining a RASS score is the first step in administering the Confusion Assessment Method in the ICU (CAM-ICU), a tool to detect delirium in intensive care unit patients.

The RASS is one of many sedation scales used in medicine. Other scales include the Ramsay scale, the Sedation-Agitation-Scale, and the COMFORT scale for pediatric patients.

== Score ==
The Richmond Agitation–Sedation Scale
| Score | Term | Description |
|---|---|---|
| +4 | Combative | Overtly combative or violent; immediate danger to staff |
| +3 | Very agitated | Pulls on or removes tube(s) or catheter(s) or has aggressive behavior toward staff |
| +2 | Agitated | Frequent nonpurposeful movement or patient–ventilator dyssynchrony |
| +1 | Restless | Anxious or apprehensive but movements not aggressive or vigorous |
| 0 | Alert and calm | Spontaneously pays attention to caregiver |
| -1 | Drowsy | Not fully alert, but has sustained (more than 10 seconds) awakening, with eye contact, to voice |
| -2 | Light sedation | Briefly (less than 10 seconds) awakens with eye contact to voice |
| -3 | Moderate sedation | Any movement (but no eye contact) to voice |
| -4 | Deep sedation | No response to voice, but any movement to physical stimulation |
| -5 | Unarousable | No response to voice or physical stimulation |

== Evaluation ==
RASS was designed to have precise, unambiguous definitions for levels of sedation that rely on an assessment of arousal, cognition, and sustainability using common responses common stimuli presented in a logical progression. To better use it these stimuli should presented to the patient as follows:

1. Observe patient. Is patient alert and calm (score 0)?
  - Does patient have behavior that is consistent with restlessness or agitation (score +1 to +4 using the criteria listed at the, under Description)?
2. If patient is not alert, in a loud speaking voice state patient's name and direct patient to open eyes and look at speaker. Repeat once if necessary. Can prompt patient to continue looking at speaker.
  - Patient has eye opening and eye contact, which is sustained for more than 10 seconds (score -1).
  - Patient has eye opening and eye contact, but this is not sustained for 10 seconds (score -2).
  - Patient has any movement in response to voice, excluding eye contact (score -3).
3. If patient does not respond to voice, physically stimulate patient by shaking shoulder and then rubbing sternum if there is no response to shaking shoulder.
  - Patient has any movement to physical stimulation (score -4).
  - Patient has no response to voice or physical stimulation (score -5).
