= Center for Security Studies =

Swiss research institute

- Abbreviation: CSS
- Formation: 1986
- Location: Zurich, Switzerland
- Website: Official website

The Center for Security Studies (CSS) is a research institute at the Swiss Federal Institute of Technology in Zurich, which focuses on Swiss and international security.

== Overview ==
The center was founded by Prof. Dr. Kurt Spillmann in 1986 and has been led by Prof. Dr. Andreas Wenger since 2002. It also constitutes as part of the Center for Comparative and International Studies (CIS) along with the political science professorships at the Swiss Federal Institute of Technology in Zurich and the University of Zurich.

The mission of the CSS is to examine the challenges surrounding security policy development and how to deal with them. It does this by performing research on security-related issues and by training researchers and practitioners. The center also includes an independent think tank, which focuses on Swiss and international security policy as well as furthering peace. Another key aim of the CSS is to serve as a link between academia, practitioners and the public on security matters.

== Projects ==
Projects which have been supported by the CSS include the Parallel History Project, an online project which collected together and analyzed declassified and other government documents relating to the Cold War, as well as the International Relations and Security Network, an online information service that provided a range of open access products and resources on international relations. While the International Relations and Security Network was closed in 2016, its extensive digital library as well as other products have been integrated into the CSS and transformed into a new project, CSS Resources.
