= Demining =

Process of removing land mines

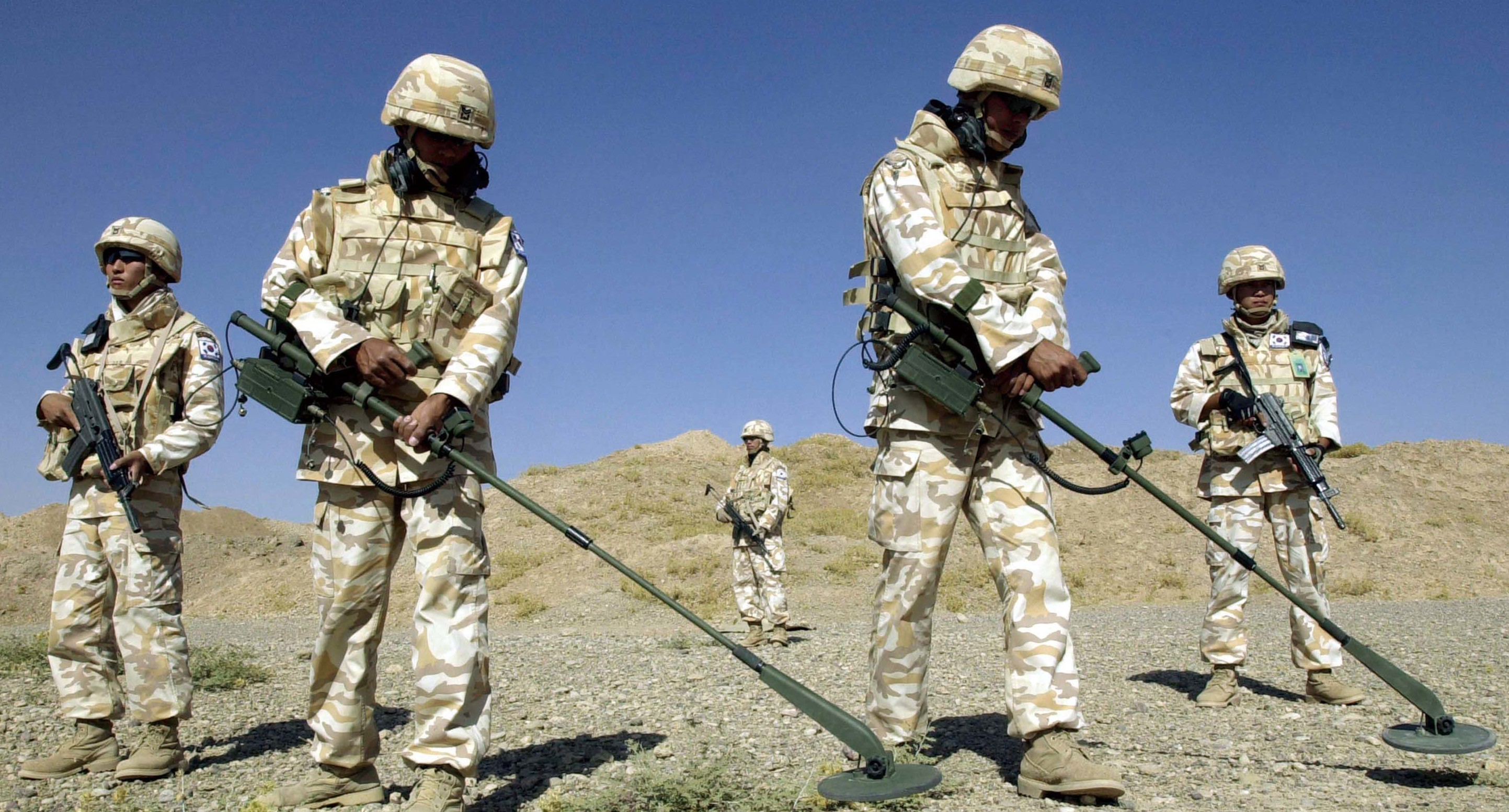
South Korean soldiers searching for land mines in Iraq

A US soldier clears a mine using a grappling hook during training.

Demining or mine clearance is the process of removing land mines from an area. In military operations, the object is to rapidly clear a path through a minefield, and this is often done with devices such as mine plows and blast waves. By contrast, the goal of humanitarian demining is to remove all of the landmines to a given depth and make the land safe for human use. Specially trained dogs are also used to narrow down the search and verify that an area is cleared. Mechanical devices such as flails and excavators are sometimes used to clear mines.

A great variety of methods for detecting landmines have been studied. These include electromagnetic methods, one of which (ground penetrating radar) has been employed in tandem with metal detectors. Acoustic methods can sense the cavity created by mine casings. Sensors have been developed to detect vapor leaking from landmines. Animals such as rats and mongooses can safely move over a minefield and detect mines, and animals can also be used to screen air samples over potential minefields. Bees, plants, and bacteria are also potentially useful. Explosives in landmines can also be detected directly using nuclear quadrupole resonance and neutron probes.

Detection and removal of landmines is a dangerous activity, and personal protective equipment does not protect against all types of landmine. Once found, mines are generally defused or blown up with more explosives, but it is possible to destroy them with certain chemicals or extreme heat without making them explode.

== Land mines ==
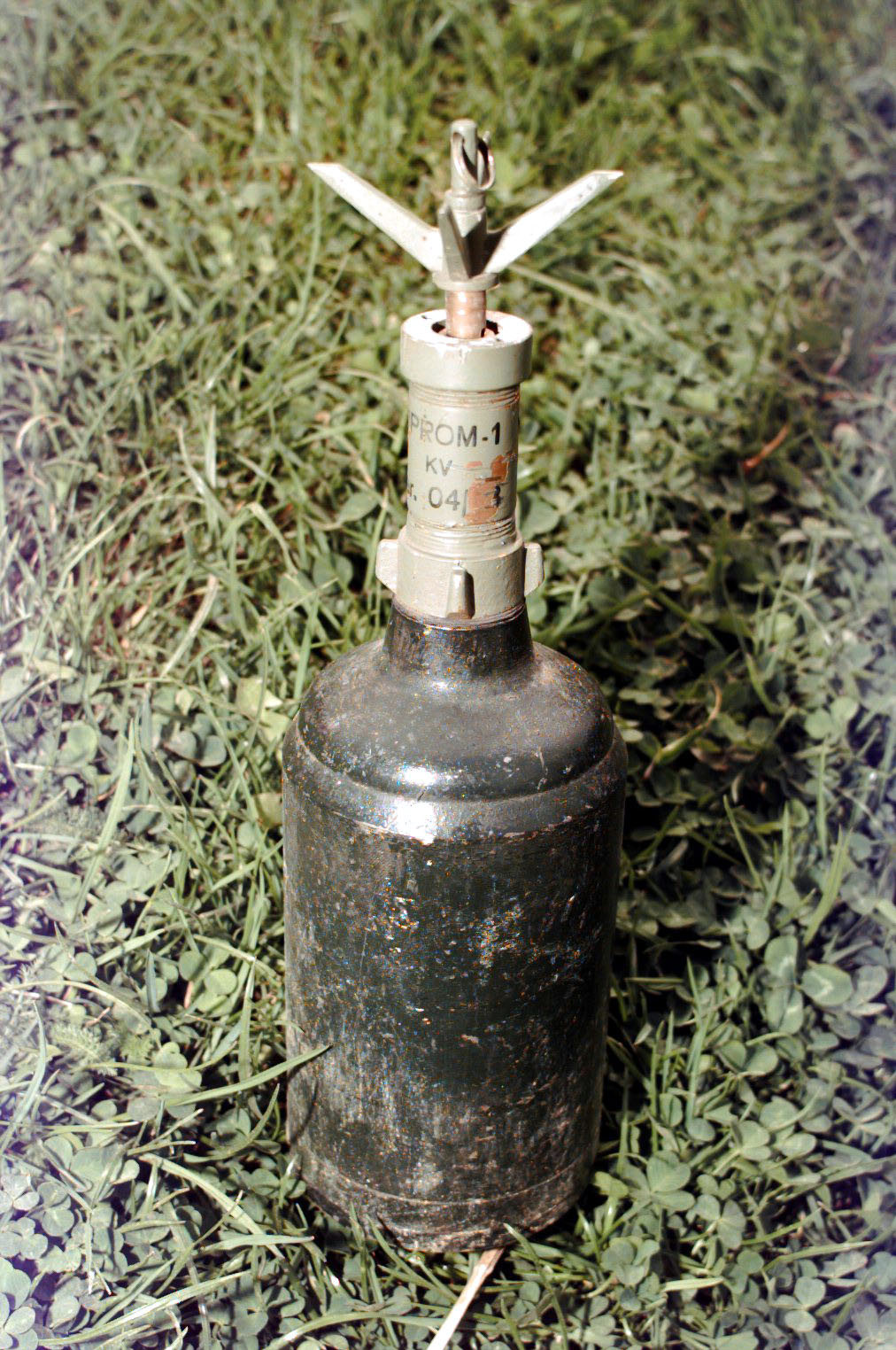
PROM-1 bounding landmine. Normally it is buried so only the prongs are exposed.

Land mines overlap with other categories of explosive devices, including unexploded ordnance (UXOs), booby traps and improvised explosive devices (IEDs). In particular, most mines are factory-built, but the definition of landmine can include "artisanal" (improvised) mines. Thus, the United Nations Mine Action Service includes mitigation of IEDs in its mission. Injuries from IEDs are much more serious, but factory-built landmines are longer lasting and often more plentiful. Over 1999–2016, yearly casualties from landmines and unexploded ordnance have varied between 9,228 and 3,450. In 2016, 78% of the casualties were suffered by civilians (42% by children), 20% by military and security personnel and 2% by deminers.

There are two main categories of land mine: anti-tank and anti-personnel. Anti-tank mines are designed to damage tanks or other vehicles; they are usually larger and require at least 100 kilograms (220 lb) of force to trigger, so infantry will not set them off.

Anti-personnel mines are designed to maim or kill soldiers. There are over 350 types, but they come in two main groups: blast and fragmentation. Blast mines are buried close to the surface and triggered by pressure. A weight between 2 and 11 kilograms (4 and 24 lb), the weight of a small child, is usually enough to set one off. They are usually cylindrical with a diameter of 5–10 centimetres (2–4 in) and a height of 3–8 centimetres (1.3–3.0 in). Fragmentation mines are designed to explode outwards resulting in casualties as much as 100 metres (300 ft) away. A subtype of fragmentation mines called "bounding" mines are specifically designed to launch upward off the ground before detonating. Their size varies and they are mostly metal, so they are easily detected by metal detectors. However, they are normally activated by tripwires that can extend up to 20 metres (70 ft) away from the mine, so tripwire detection is essential.

The casing of blast mines may be made of metal, wood, or plastic. Some mines, referred to as minimum metal mines, are constructed with as little metal as possible – as little as 1 gram (0.04 oz) – to make them difficult to detect. Common explosives used in land mines include TNT (C_{7}H_{5}N_{3}O_{6}), RDX (C_{3}H_{6}N_{6}O_{6}), pentaerythritol tetranitrate (PETN, O_{12}N_{8}C_{4}H_{8}), HMX (O_{8}N_{8}C_{4}H_{8}) and ammonium nitrate (NH_{4}NO_{3}).

Land mines are found in about 60 countries. Deminers must cope with environments that include deserts, jungles, and urban environments. Antitank mines are buried deeply while antipersonnel mines are usually within 15 centimetres (6 in) of the surface. Mines may be placed by hand or scattered from airplanes, in regular or irregular patterns. In urban environments, fragments of destroyed buildings may hide them; in rural environments, soil erosion may cover them or displace them. Detectors can be confused by high-metal soils and junk. Thus, demining presents a considerable engineering challenge.

== Goals ==
=== Military mine clearance ===
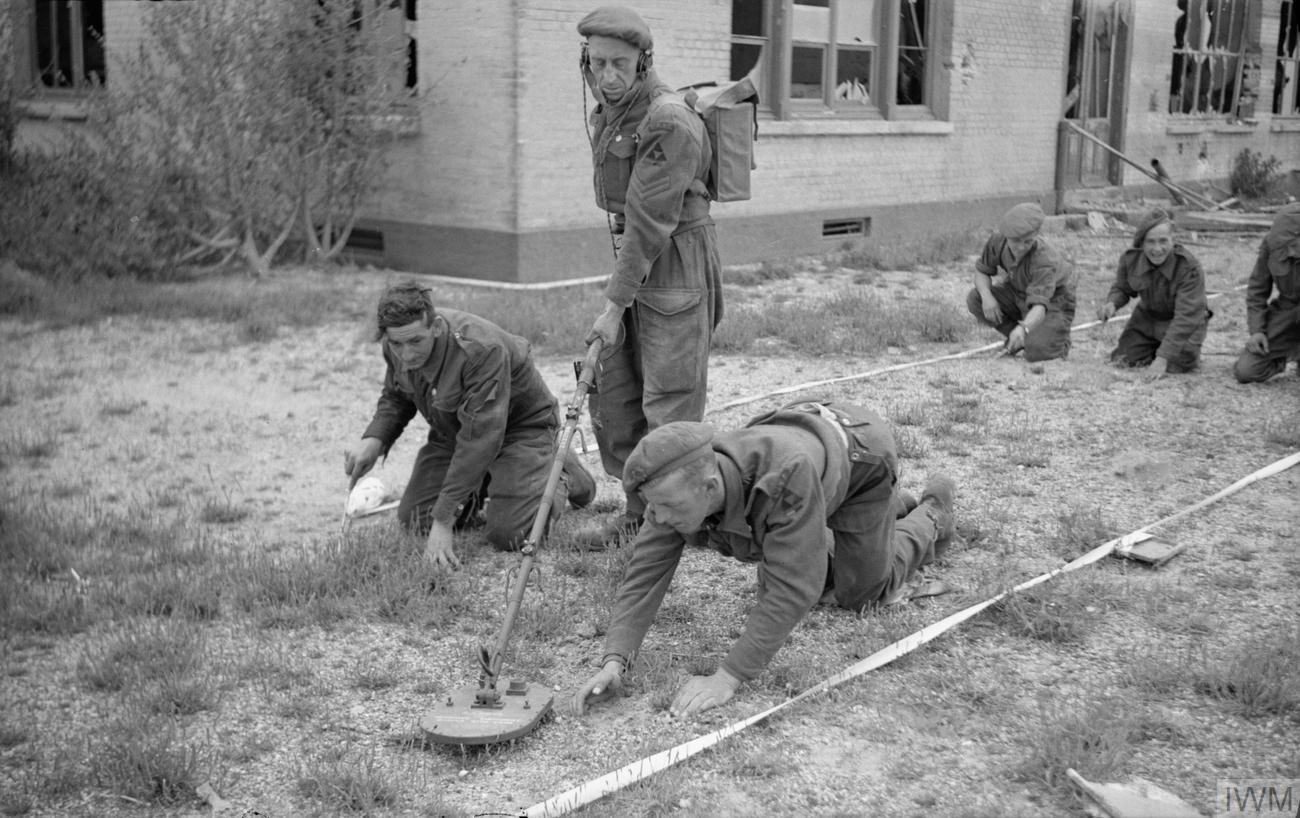
British Army sappers clearing a beach front in Normandy (1944)

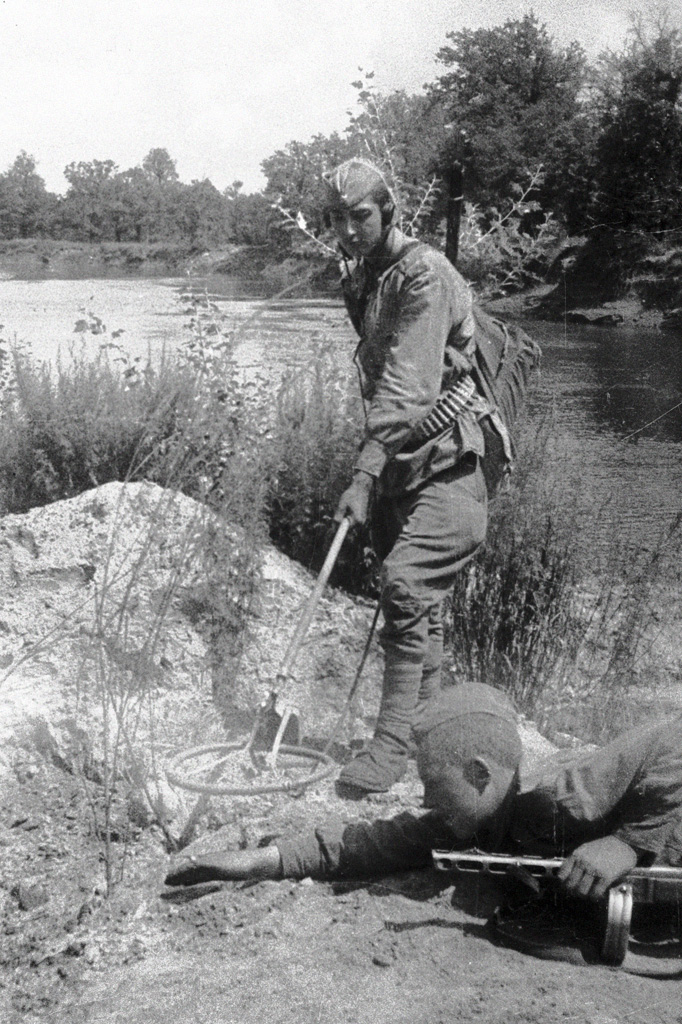
Soviet Engineer Troops defusing explosive devices in August 1942, during the Second World War

In military demining, the goal is to create a safe path for troops and equipment. The soldiers who carry out this task are known as combat engineers, sappers, or pioneers. Sometimes soldiers may bypass a minefield, but some bypasses are designed to concentrate advancing troops into a killing zone. If engineers need to clear a path (an operation known as breaching), they may be under heavy fire and need supporting fire to suppress the enemy or obscure the site with smoke. Some risk of casualties is accepted, but engineers under heavy fire may need to clear an obstacle in 7–10 minutes to avoid excessive casualties, so manual breaching may be too slow. They may need to operate in bad weather or at night. Good intelligence is needed on factors like the locations of minefields, types of mines and how they were laid, their density and pattern, ground conditions and the size and location of enemy defenses.

=== Humanitarian demining ===
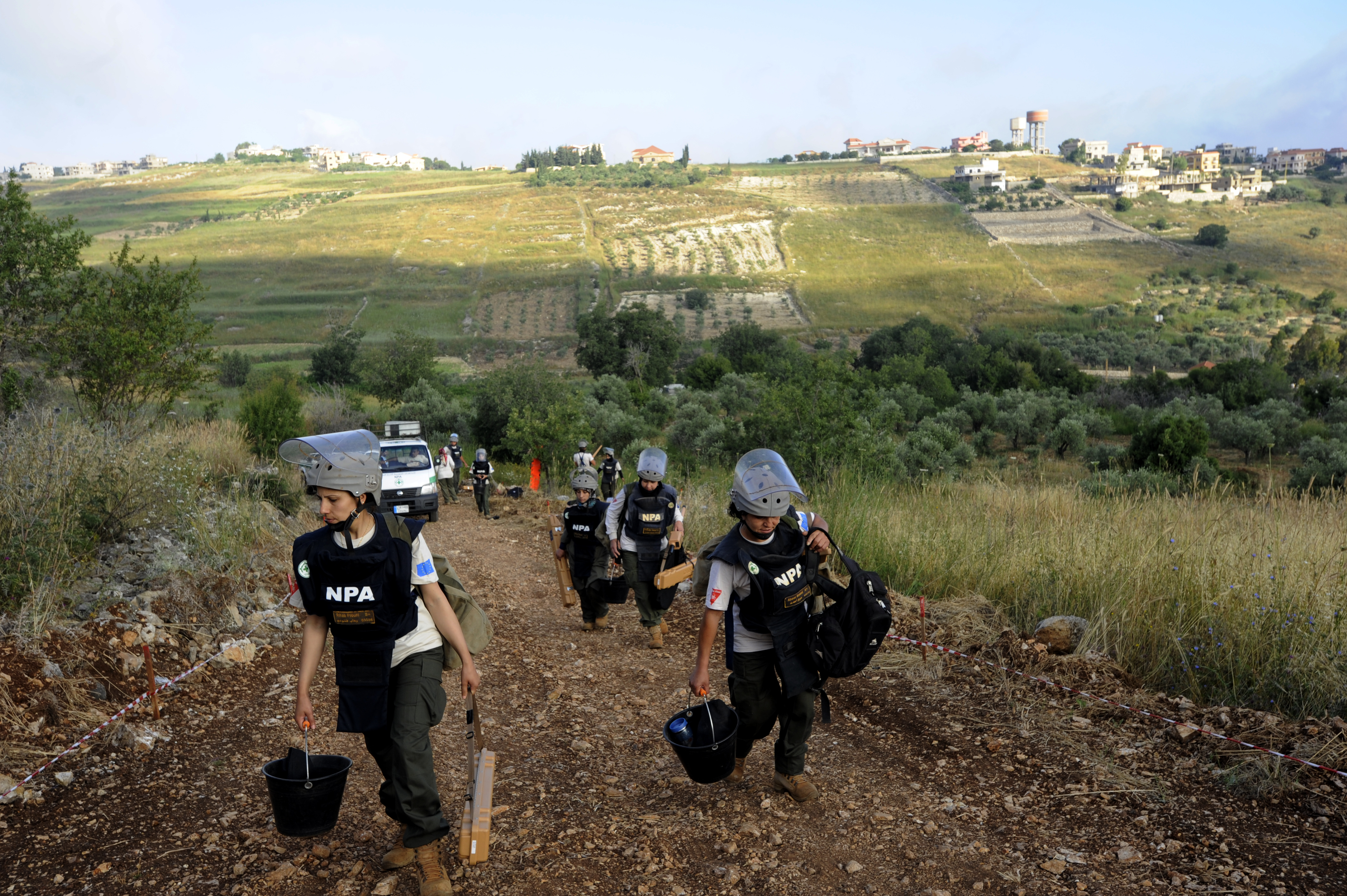
Humanitarian workers demining Israeli cluster bombs in South Lebanon, 2011

Humanitarian demining is a component of mine action, a broad effort to reduce the social, economic and environmental damage of mines. The other "pillars" of mine action are risk education, victim assistance, stockpile destruction, and advocacy against the use of anti-personnel mines and cluster munitions. Humanitarian demining differs from military demining in several ways. Military demining operations require speed and reliability under combat conditions to safely bypass a mine field so it is more acceptable if some mines are missed in the process. Humanitarian demining aims to reduce risk for deminers and civilians as much as possible by removing (ideally) all landmines and demining work can usually be temporarily halted if unfavorable circumstances arise. In some situations, it is a necessary precondition for other humanitarian programs. Normally, a national mine action authority (NMAA) is given the primary responsibility for mine action, which it manages through a mine action center (MAC). This coordinates the efforts of other players including government agencies, non-governmental organizations (NGOs), commercial companies, and militaries.

The International Mine Action Standards (IMAS) provide a framework for mine action. While not legally binding in themselves, they are intended as guidelines for countries to develop their own standards. The IMAS also draw on international treaties including the Mine Ban Treaty, which has provisions for destroying stockpiles and clearing minefields.

In the 1990s, before the IMAS, the United Nations required that deminers had to clear 99.6% of all mines and explosive ordnance. However, professional deminers found that unacceptably lax because they would be responsible if any mines later harmed civilians. In contrast, the IMAS call for the clearance of all mines and UXOs from a given area to a specified depth.

== Contamination and clearance ==
As of 2017, antipersonnel mines are known to contaminate 61 states and suspected in another 10. The most heavily contaminated (with more than 100 square kilometres (40 mi^{2}) of minefield each) are Afghanistan, Angola, Azerbaijan, Bosnia and Herzegovina, Cambodia, Chad, Iraq, Thailand, Turkey, and Ukraine. According to TeKimiti Gilbert, Lebanon has the highest contamination density of cluster bombs relative to its size, with over a million cluster munitions and 357,000 landmines remaining in South Lebanon. Parties to the Mine Ban Treaty are required to clear all mines within 10 years of joining the treaty, and as of 2017, 28 countries had succeeded. However, several countries were not on track to meet their deadline or had requested extensions.

A 2003 RAND Corporation report estimated that there are 45–50 million mines and 100,000 are cleared each year, so at present rates it would take about 500 years to clear them all. Another 1.9 million (19 more years of clearance) are added each year. However, there is a large uncertainty in the total number and the area affected. Records by armed forces are often incomplete or nonexistent, and many mines were dropped by airplane. Various natural events such as floods can move mines around and new mines continue to be laid. When minefields are cleared, the actual number of mines tends to be far smaller than the initial estimate; for example, early estimates for Mozambique were several million, but after most of the clearing had been done only 140,000 mines had been found. Thus, it may be more accurate to say that there are millions of landmines, not tens of millions.

Before minefields can be cleared, they need to be located. This begins with non-technical survey, gathering records of mine placement and accidents from mines, interviewing former combatants and locals, noting locations of warning signs and unused agricultural land, and going to look at possible sites. This is supplemented by technical survey, where potentially hazardous areas are physically explored to improve knowledge of their boundaries. A good survey can greatly reduce the time required to clear an area; in one study of 15 countries, less than 3 percent of the area cleared actually contained mines.

== Economics ==
By one United Nations estimate, the cost to produce a landmine is between $3 and $75 while the cost of removing it is between $300 and $1000. However, such estimates may be misleading. The cost of clearance can vary considerably since it depends on the terrain, the ground cover (dense foliage makes it more difficult) and the method; and some areas that are checked for mines turn out to have none.

Although the Mine Ban Treaty gives each state the primary responsibility to clear its own mines, other states that can help are required to do so. In 2016, 31 donors (led by the United States with $152.1 million and the European Union with $73.8 million) contributed a total of $479.5 million to mine action, of which $343.2 million went to clearance and risk education. The top 5 recipient states (Iraq, Afghanistan, Croatia, Cambodia and Laos) received 54% of this support.

== Conventional detection methods ==
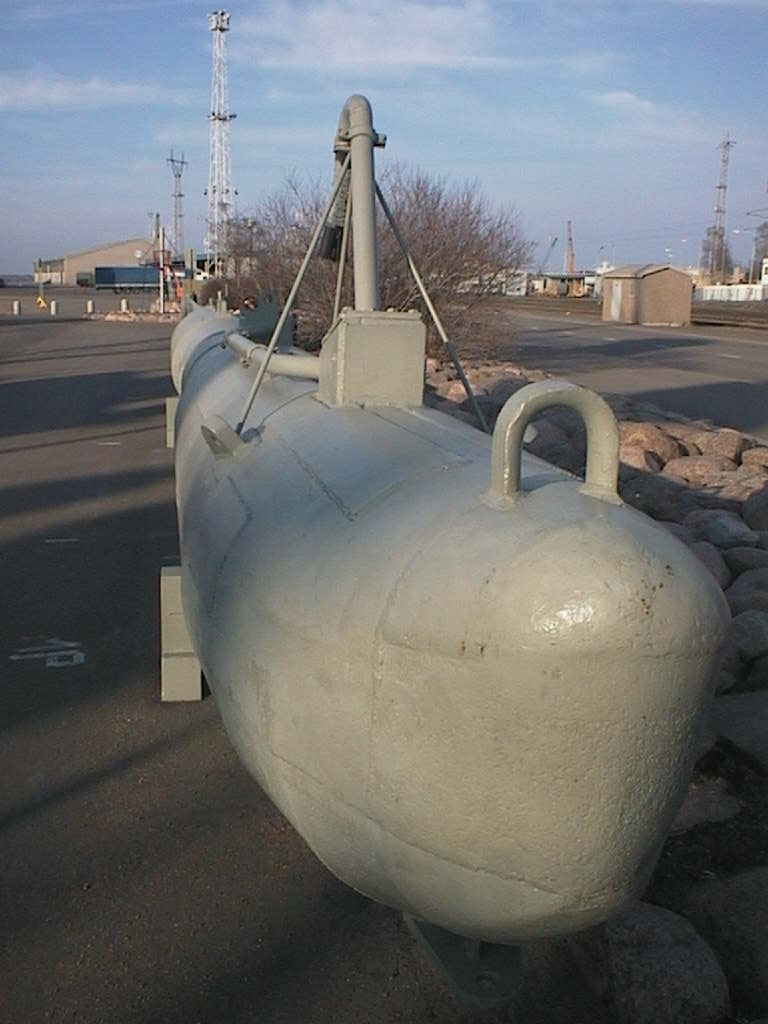
Naval minesweeper as a monument in Kotka, Finland

The conventional method of landmine detection was developed in World War II and has changed little since then. It involves a metal detector, prodding instrument and tripwire feeler. Deminers clear an area of vegetation and then divide it into lanes. A deminer advances along a lane, swinging a metal detector close to the ground. When metal is detected, the deminer prods the object with a stick or probe to determine whether it is a mine. If a mine is found, it must be deactivated.

Although conventional demining is slow (5 to 150 square metres (54 to 1,600 ft^{2}) cleared per day), it is reliable, so it is still the most commonly used method. Integration with other methods such as explosive sniffing dogs can increase its reliability.

Demining is a dangerous occupation. If a deminer prods a mine too hard or fails to detect it, the deminer can suffer injury or death, and the large number of false positives from metal detectors can make deminers tired and careless. According to one report, there is an accident for every 1,000–2,000 mines cleared. 35 percent of the accidents occur during mine excavation and 24 percent result from missed mines.

Mine layers often use anti-demining techniques, including anti-lift devices, booby traps and two or three mines placed on top of each other. Anti-personnel mines are often triggered by tripwires.

=== Prodders ===
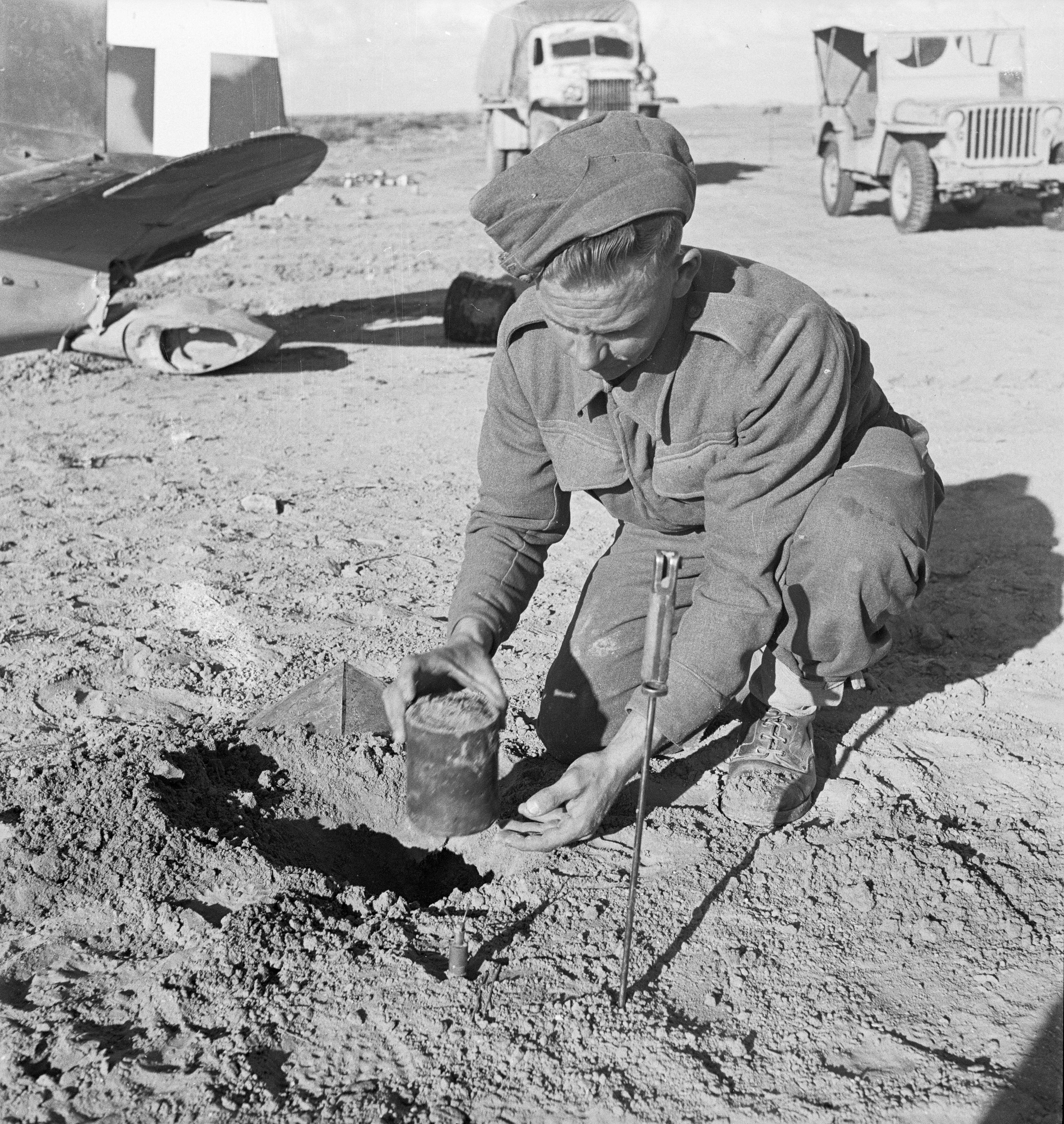
A New Zealand engineer clearing mines in Tripoli during World War II with a prodding tool in the foreground

In World War II, the primary method of locating mines was by prodding the ground with a pointed stick or bayonet. Modern tools for prodding range from a military prodder to a screwdriver or makeshift object. They are inserted at shallow angles (30 degrees or less) to probe the sides of potential mines, avoiding the triggering mechanism that is usually on top. This method requires the deminer's head and hands to be near the mine. Rakes may also be used when the terrain is soft (e.g., sandy beaches); the deminer is further away from the mine and the rake can be used to either prod or scoop up mines from beneath.

=== Metal detectors ===
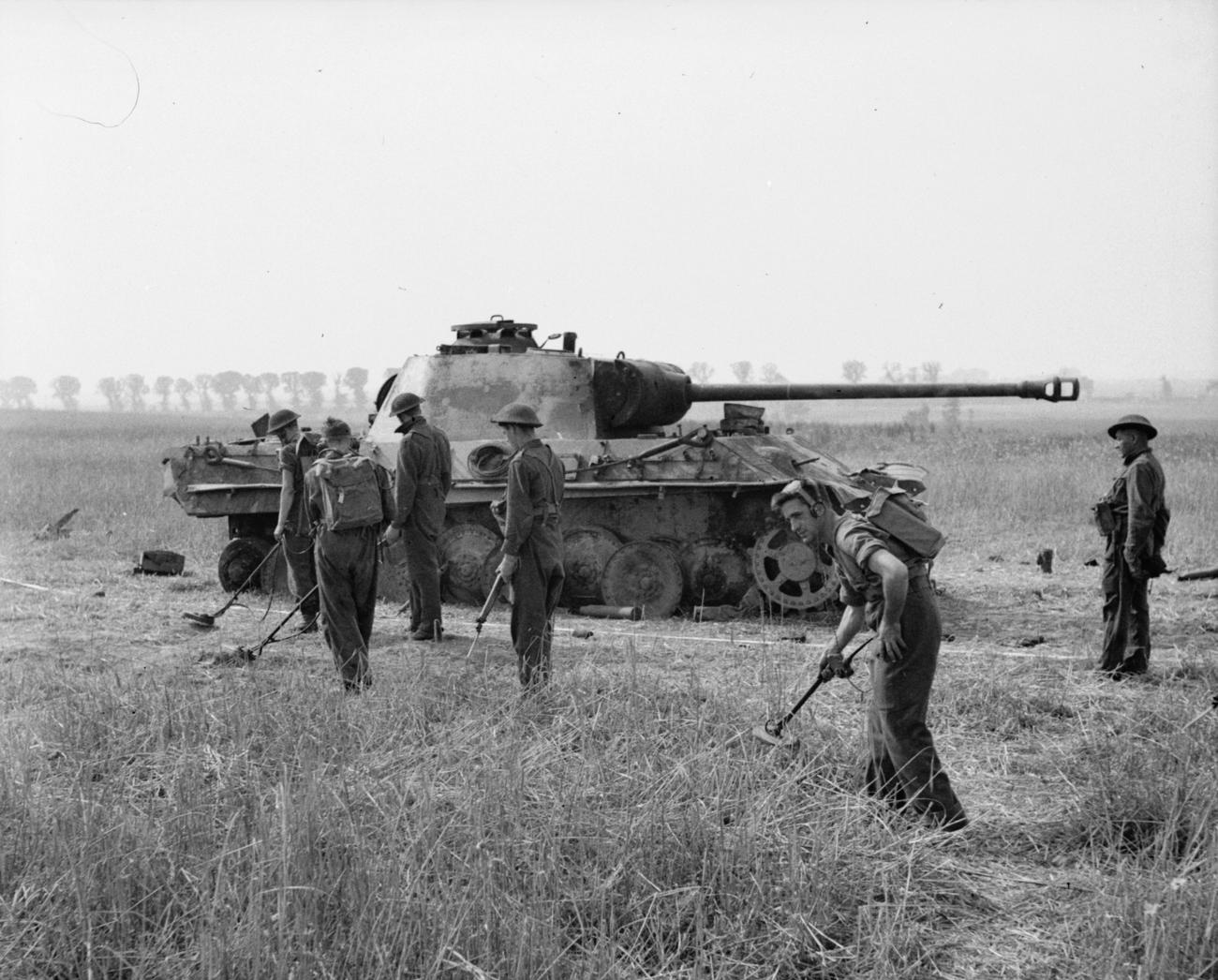
Royal Engineers with Polish mine detectors sweeping for mines near a knocked out tank, August 1944.

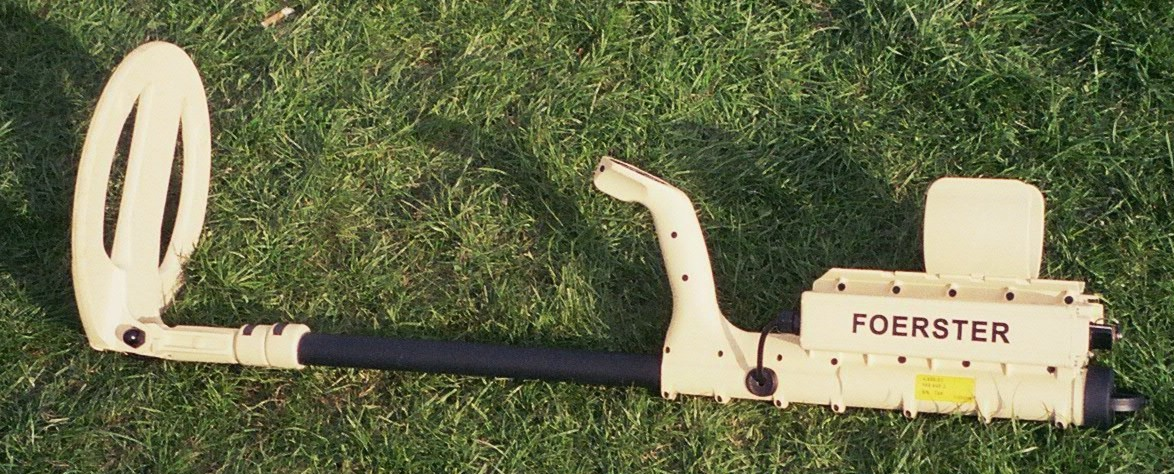
Foerster Minex 2FD 4.500 metal detector used by the French army

Metal detectors used by deminers work on the same principles as detectors used in World War I and refined during World War II. A practical design by Polish officer Józef Kosacki, known as the Polish mine detector, was used to clear German mine fields during the Second Battle of El Alamein.

Although metal detectors have become much lighter, more sensitive and easier to operate than the early models, the basic principle is still electromagnetic induction. Current through a wire coil produces a time-varying magnetic field that in turn induces currents in conductive objects in the ground. In turn, these currents generate a magnetic field that induces currents in a receiver coil, and the resulting changes in electric potential can be used to detect metal objects. Similar devices are used by hobbyists.

Nearly all mines contain enough metal to be detectable. No detector finds all mines, and the performance depends on factors such as the soil, type of mine and depth of burial. An international study in 2001 found that the most effective detector found 91 percent of the test mines in clay soil but only 71 percent in iron-rich soil. The worst detector found only 11 percent even in clay soils. The results can be improved by multiple passes.

An even greater problem is the number of false positives. Minefields contain many other fragments of metal, including shrapnel, bullet casings, and metallic minerals. 100–1000 such objects are found for every real mine. The greater the sensitivity, the more false positives. The Cambodian Mine Action Centre found that, over a six-year period, 99.6 percent of the time (a total of 23 million hours) was spent digging up scrap.

=== Dogs ===
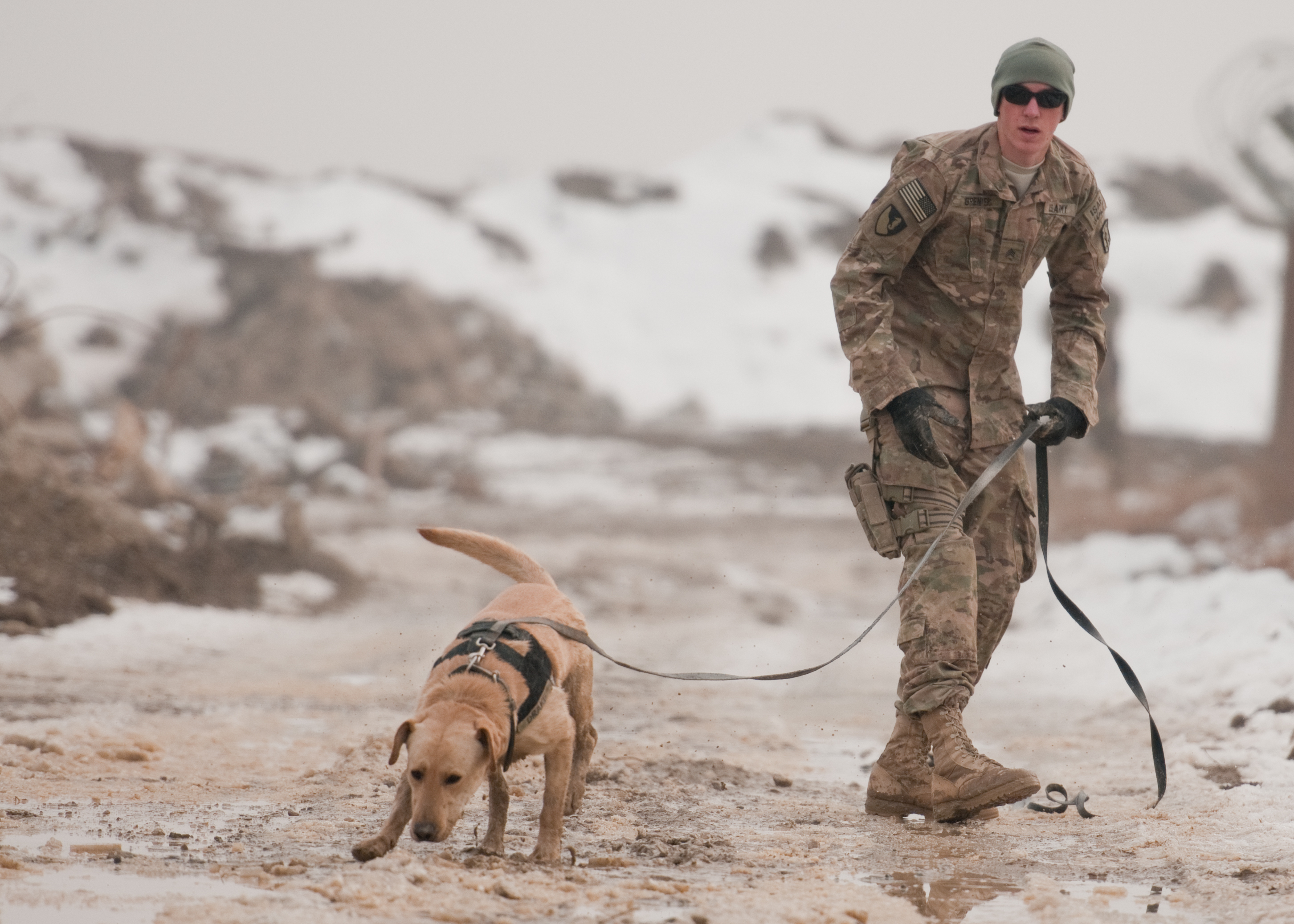
Mine detection dog in training (Bagram Airfield, Afghanistan)

Dogs have been used in demining since World War II. They are up to a million times more sensitive to chemicals than humans, but their true capability is unknown because they can sense explosives at lower concentrations than the best chemical detectors. Well-trained mine-detection dogs (MDDs) can sniff out explosive chemicals like TNT, monofilament lines used in tripwires, and metallic wire used in booby traps and mines. The area they can clear ranges from a few hundred to a thousand meters per day, depending on several factors. In particular, an unfavorable climate or thick vegetation can impede them, and they can get confused if there is too high a density of mines. The detection rate is also variable, so the International Mine Action Standards require an area to be covered by two dogs before it can be declared safe.

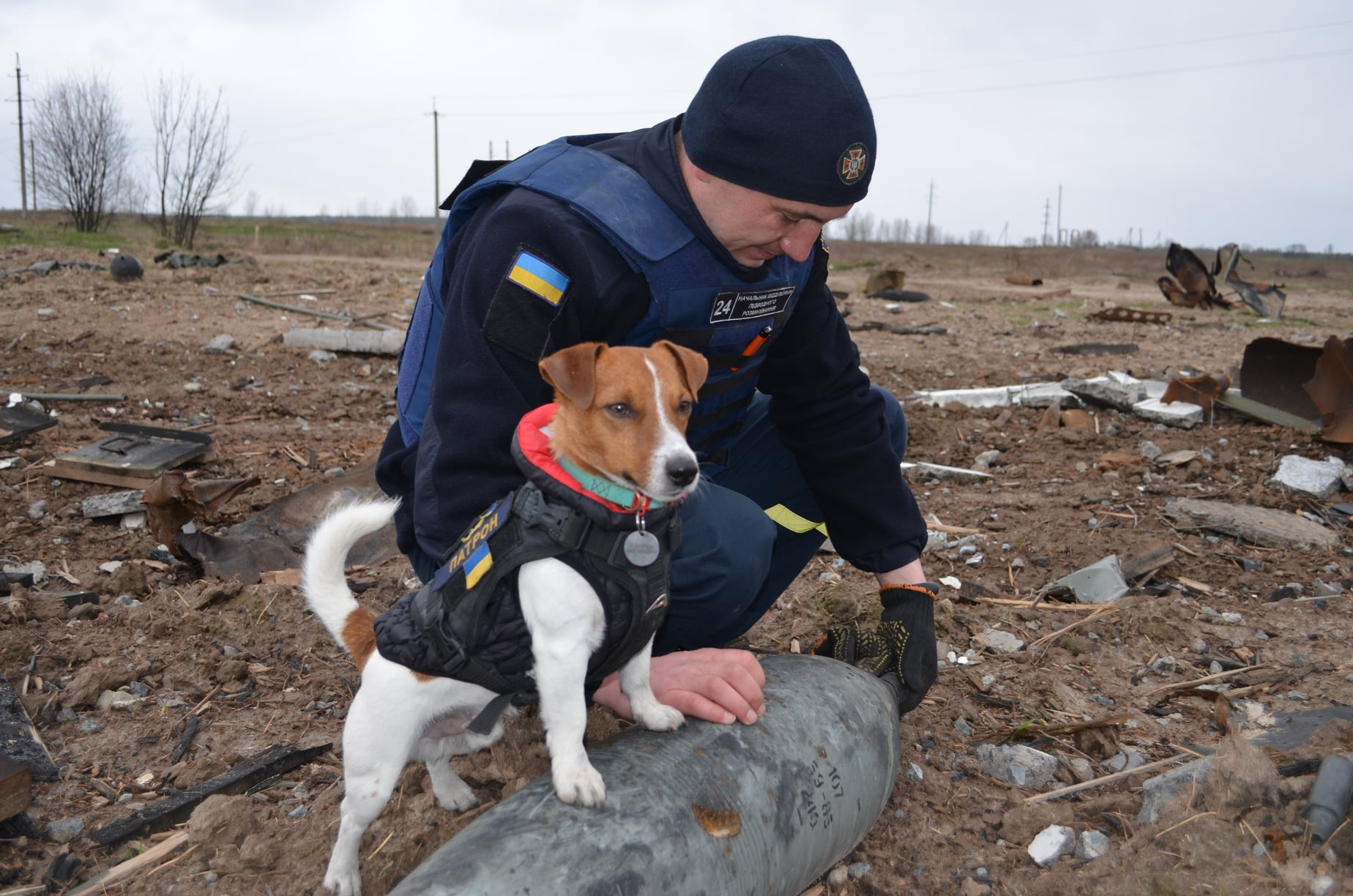
Ukrainian sapper with a landmine finder dog Patron after battle during the 2022 Russian invasion

Preferred breeds for MDDs are the German Shepherd and Belgian Malinois, although some Labrador Retrievers and Beagles are used. They cost about $10,000 each to train. This cost includes 8–10 weeks of initial training. Another 8–10 weeks is needed in the country where the dog is deployed to accustom the dog to its handler, the soil and climate, and the type of explosives.

MDDs were first deployed in WWII. They have been extensively used in Afghanistan, which still has one of the largest programs. Over 900 are used in 24 countries. Their preferred role is for verifying that an area is cleared and narrowing down the region to be searched. They are also used in Remote Explosive Scent Tracing (REST). This involves collecting air samples from stretches of land about 100 metres (300 ft) long and having dogs or rats sniff them to determine whether the area needs clearing.

=== Mechanical ===
==== Mine clearing machines ====
Mechanical demining makes use of vehicles with devices such as tillers, flails, rollers, and excavation. Used for military operations as far back as World War I, they were initially "cumbersome, unreliable and under-powered", but have been improved with additional armor, safer cabin designs, reliable power trains, Global Positioning System logging systems and remote control. They are now primarily used in humanitarian demining for technical surveys, to prepare the ground (removing vegetation and tripwires), and to detonate explosives.

Tiller systems consist of a heavy drum fitted with teeth or bits that are intended to destroy or detonate mines to a given depth. However, mines can be forced downwards or collected in a "bow wave" in front of the roller. They have trouble with steep slopes, wet conditions and large stones; light vegetation improves the performance, but thicker vegetation inhibits it. Flails, first used on Sherman tanks, have an extended arm with a rotating drum to which are attached chains with weights on the end. The chains act like swinging hammers. The strike force is enough to set off mines, smash them to pieces, damage the firing mechanism or throw the mine up. A blast shield protects the driver and the cabin is designed to deflect projectiles. Mine flail effectiveness can approach 100% in ideal conditions, but clearance rates as low as 50–60% have been reported.

First used in World War I with tanks, rollers are designed to detonate mines; blast-resistant vehicles with steel wheels, such as the Casspir, serve a similar purpose. However, those used in humanitarian demining cannot withstand the blast from an anti-tank mine, so their use must be preceded by careful surveying. Unlike flails and tillers, they only destroy functioning mines, and even those do not always explode.

Excavation, the removal of soil to a given depth, is done using modified construction vehicles such as bulldozers, excavators, front-end loaders, tractors and soil sifters. Armor plates and reinforced glass are added. Removed soil is sifted and inspected. It can also be fed through an industrial rock crusher, which is robust enough to withstand blasts from antipersonnel mines. Excavation is a reliable way of clearing an area to a depth that other mechanical systems cannot reach, and it has been used in several countries. In particular, the HALO Trust estimates that their excavation program destroys mines about 7 times faster than manual deminers.

A 2004 study by the Geneva International Centre for Humanitarian Demining concluded that the data on the performance of mechanical demining systems was poor, and perhaps as a result, they were not being used as the primary clearance system (with the exception of excavators). However, by 2014, confidence in these systems had increased to the point where some deminers were using them as primary clearance systems.

Mechanical demining techniques have some challenges. In steep, undulating terrain they may skip over some of the ground. Operators can be endangered by defective mines or mines with delay charges that detonate after the blast shield has passed over; shaped charge mines that are capable of piercing most armor; and intelligent mines that are off to the side and use a variety of sensors to decide when to fire a rocket at an armored vehicle. One answer is to use remote controlled vehicles such as the Caterpillar D7 MCAP (United States) and the Caterpillar D9 (Israel).

Improvised techniques are sometimes used by people who need the use of land before formal demining. In parts of Ukraine mined during fighting associated with the Russian invasion that started in 2022, farmers who need to use the land improvised a mine-clearing machine by welding parts of rugged abandoned Russian fighting vehicles such as tanks on to an old tractor and harrow, remotely controlled by a battery-powered controller.

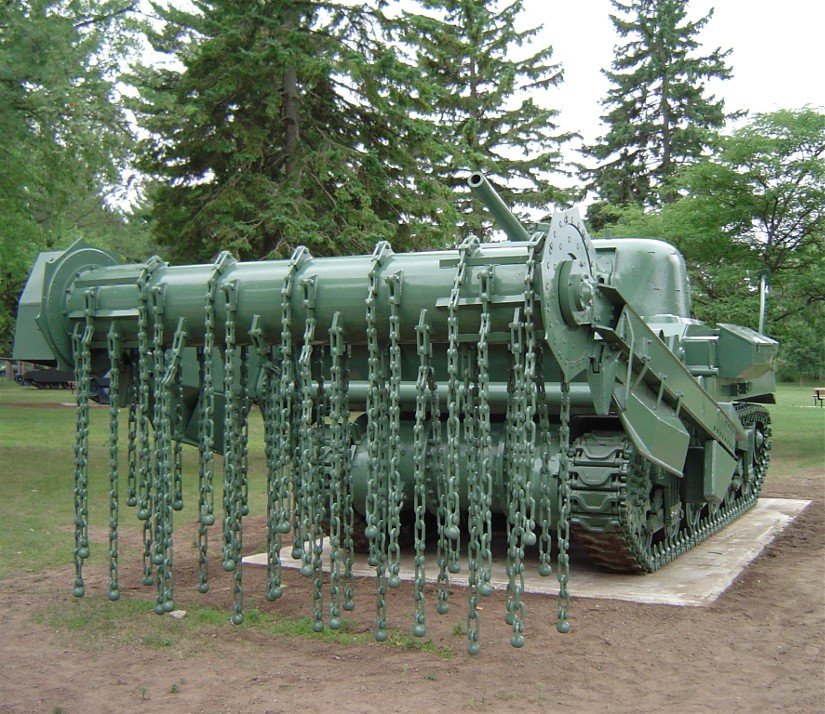
World War II M4 Sherman tank fitted with a flail

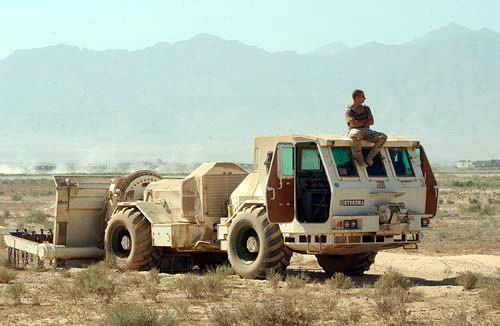
Hydrema mine clearing vehicles use flails.

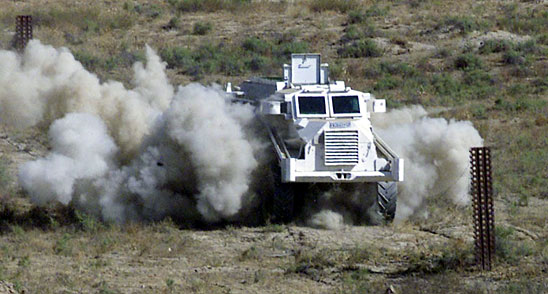
The Casspir, a steel, armor-bodied V-hulled vehicle de-mining Bagram Air Base

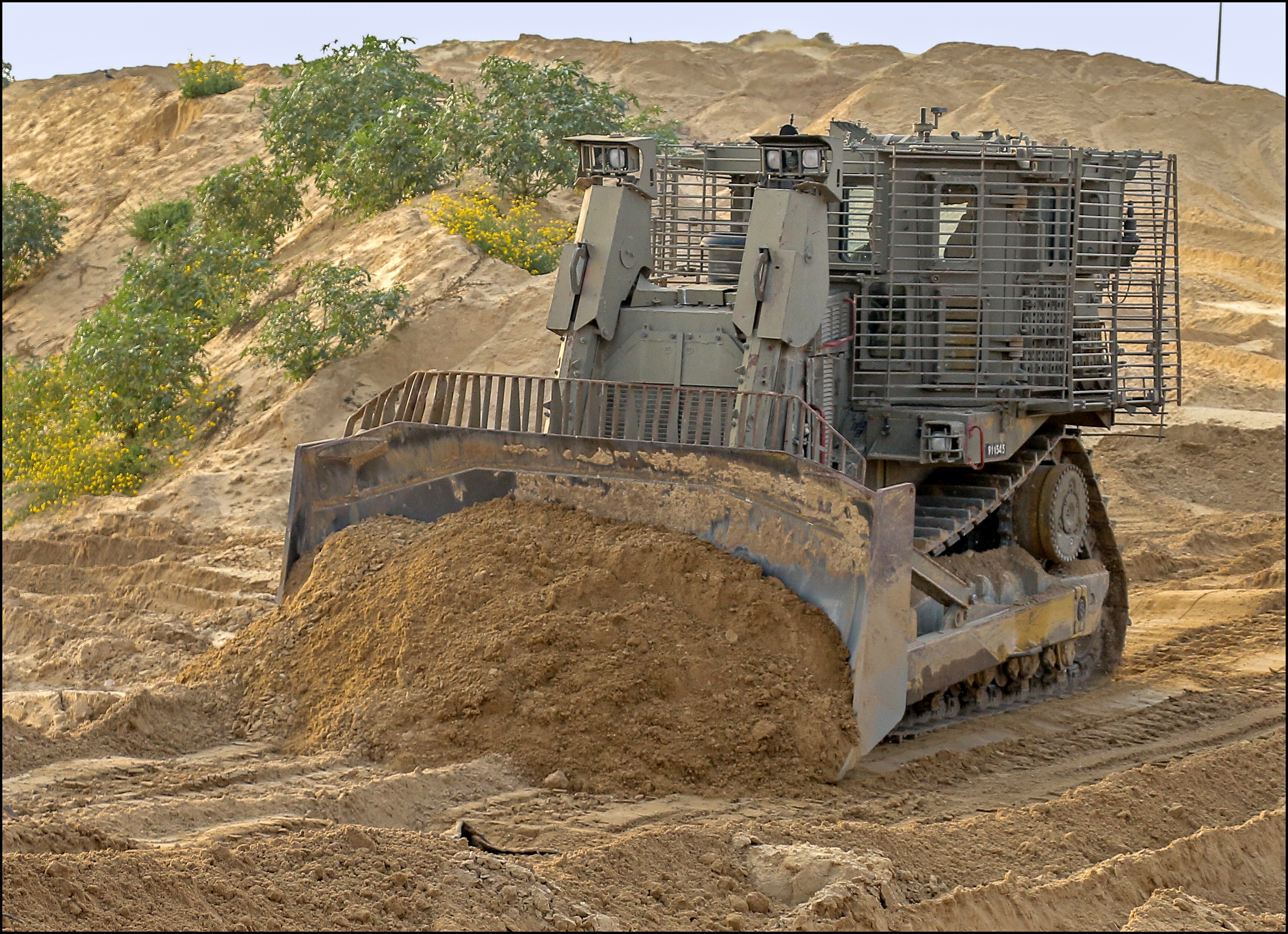
IDF Caterpillar D9 uses a standard blade or a special mine plow.

==== Smart prodders ====
Despite advances in mine detection technology, "mine detection boils down to rows of nervous people wearing blast-resistant clothing and creeping laboriously across a field, prodding the ground ahead to check for buried objects." Often, especially when the soil is hard, they unwittingly apply too much force and risk detonating a mine. Prodders have been developed that provide feedback on the amount of force.

== Detection methods under development ==
Universities, corporations and government bodies have been developing a great variety of methods for detecting mines. However, it is difficult to compare their performance. One quantitative measure is a receiver operating characteristic (ROC) curve, which measures the tradeoff between false positives and false negatives. Ideally, there should be a high probability of detection with few false positives, but such curves have not been obtained for most of the technologies. Also, even if field tests were available for all technologies, they may not be comparable because performance depends on a myriad of factors, including the size, shape and composition of the mines; their depth and orientation; the type of explosive; environmental conditions; and performance of human operators. Most field tests have taken place in conditions that favor the performance of the technology, leading to overestimates of their performance.

=== Electromagnetic ===
==== Ground-penetrating radar ====
Ground-penetrating radar (GPR) probes the ground using radar. A GPR device emits radio waves; these waves are reflected at discontinuities in permittivity and one or more antennae pick up the return signal. The signal is analyzed to determine the shapes and locations of the reflectors. Discontinuities occur between materials with different dielectric constants such as a landmine, a rock and soil. Unlike metal detectors, GPR devices can detect nonmetallic mine casings. However, radio waves have wavelengths that are comparable to the dimensions of landmines, so the images have low resolution. The wavelength can be varied; smaller wavelengths give better image quality but cannot penetrate as far into the soil. This tradeoff in performance depends on soil properties and other environmental factors as well as the properties of the mines. In particular, attenuation in wet soils can make it difficult to spot mines deeper than 4 centimetres (1.6 inches), while low-frequency radar will "bounce" off small plastic mines near the surface. Although GPR is a mature technology for other applications such as searching for archaeological artifacts, the effect of those factors on mine detection is still not adequately understood, and GPR is not widely used for demining.

GPR can be used with a metal detector and data-fusion algorithms to greatly reduce the false alarms generated by metallic clutter. One such dual-sensor device, the Handheld Standoff Mine Detection System (HSTAMIDS) became the standard mine detector of the US Army in 2006. For humanitarian demining, it was tested in Cambodia for a variety of soil conditions and mine types, detecting 5,610 mines and correctly identifying 96.5% of the clutter. Another dual detector developed by ERA Technology, the Cobham VMR3 Minehound, had similar success in Bosnia, Cambodia and Angola. These dual-sensor devices are relatively light and cheap, and the HALO Trust has begun to deploy more of them around the world.

==== Infrared and hyperspectral ====
Soil absorbs radiation from the Sun and is heated, with a resulting change in the infrared radiation that it emits. Landmines are better insulators than soil. As a result, the soil overhead tends to heat faster during the day and cool faster at night. Thermography uses infrared sensors to detect anomalies in the heating and cooling cycle. The effect can be enhanced using a heat source. The act of burying a mine also affects the soil properties, with small particles tending to collect near the surface. This tends to suppress the frequency-dependent characteristics that are evident in the larger particles. Hyperspectral imaging, which senses dozens of frequency bands ranging from visible light to long-wave infrared, can detect this effect. Finally, polarized light reflecting off man-made materials tend to remain polarized while natural materials depolarize it; the difference can be seen using a polarimeter.

The above methods can be used from a safe distance, including on airborne platforms. The detector technology is well developed and the main challenge is to process and interpret the images. The algorithms are underdeveloped and have trouble coping with the extreme dependence of performance on environmental conditions. Many of the surface effects are strongest just after the mine is buried and are soon removed by weathering.

==== Electrical impedance tomography ====
Electrical impedance tomography (EIT) maps out the electrical conductivity of the ground using a two-dimensional grid of electrodes. Pairs of electrodes receive a small current and the resulting voltages measured on the remaining electrodes. The data are analyzed to construct a map of the conductivity. Both metallic and non-metallic mines will show up as anomalies. Unlike most other methods, EIT works best in wet conditions, so it serves as a useful complement to them. However, the electrodes must be planted in the ground, which risks setting off a mine, and it can only detect mines near the surface.

==== X-ray backscatter ====
In X-ray backscatter, an area is irradiated with X-rays (photons with wavelengths between 0.01 and 10 nanometres) and detecting the photons that are reflected back. Metals strongly absorb x-rays and little is reflected back, while organic materials absorb little and reflect a lot. Methods that use collimators to narrow the beams are not suitable for demining because the collimators are heavy and high-power sources are required. The alternative is to use wide beams and deconvolve the signal using spatial filters. The medical industry has driven improvements in x-ray technology, so portable x-ray generators are available. In principle, the short wavelength would allow high-resolution images, but it may take too long because the intensity must be kept low to limit exposure of humans to the radiation. Also, only mines less than 10 centimetres deep would be imaged.

=== Explosive vapor detection ===
A buried mine will almost always leak explosives through the casing. 95 percent of this will be adsorbed by the soil, but the other 5 percent will mostly dissolve in water and be transported away. If it gets to the surface, it leaves a chemical signature. TNT biodegrades within a few days in soil, but an impurity, 2,4-dinitrotoluene (2,4-DNT), lasts much longer and has a high vapor pressure. Thus, it is the primary target for chemical detection. However, the concentrations are very small, particularly in dry conditions. A reliable vapor detection system needs to detect 10^{−18} grams of 2,4-DNT per millilitre of air in very dry soil or 10^{−15} grams per millilitre in moist soil. Biological detectors are very effective, but some chemical sensors are being developed.

==== Honey bees ====
Honey bees can be used to locate mines in two ways: passive sampling and active detection. In passive sampling, their mop-like hairs, which are electrostatically charged, collect a variety of particles including chemicals leaking from explosives. The chemicals are also present in water that they bring back and air that they breathe. Methods such as solid phase microextraction, sorbent sol-gels, gas chromatography and mass spectrometry can be used to identify explosive chemicals in the hive.

Honey bees can also be trained, in 1–2 days, to associate the smell of an explosive with food. In field trials, they detected concentrations of parts per trillion with a detection probability of 97–99 percent and false positives of less than 1 percent. When targets were placed consisting of small amounts of 2.4-DNT mixed with sand, they detect vapor plumes from the source several meters away and follow them to the source. Bees make thousands of foraging flights per day, and over time high concentrations of bees occur over targets. The most challenging issue is tracking them when a bee can fly 3 to 5 kilometres (2 to 3 mi) before returning to the hive. However, tests using lidar (a laser scanning technique) have been promising.

Bees do not fly at night, in heavy rain or wind, or in temperatures below 4 °C (39 °F), but the performance of dogs is also limited under these conditions. So far, most tests have been conducted in dry conditions in open terrain, so the effect of vegetation is not known. Tests have commenced in real minefields in Croatia and the results are promising, although after about three days the bees must be retrained because they are not getting food rewards from the mines.

==== Rats ====
Like dogs, giant pouched rats are being trained to sniff out chemicals like TNT in landmines. A Belgian NGO, APOPO, trains rats in Tanzania at a cost of $6000 per rat. These rats, nicknamed "HeroRATS", have been deployed in Mozambique and Cambodia. APOPO credits the rats with clearing more than 100,000 mines.

Rats have the advantage of being far lower mass than the human or dogs, so they are less likely to set off mines. They are just smart enough to learn repetitive tasks but not smart enough to get bored; and unlike dogs, they do not bond with their trainers, so they are easier to transfer between handlers. They have far fewer false positives than metal detectors, which detect any form of metal, so in a day they can cover an area that would take a metal detector two weeks.

==== Other mammals ====
In Sri Lanka, dogs are an expensive option for mine detection because they cannot be trained locally. The Sri Lankan Army Corps of Engineers has been conducting research on the use of the mongoose for mine detection, with promising initial results. Engineer Thrishantha Nanayakkara and colleagues at the University of Moratuwa in Sri Lanka have been developing a method where a mongoose is guided by a remote-controlled robot.

During the Angolan Civil War, elephants fled to neighboring countries. After the war ended in 2002, they started returning, but Angola was littered with millions of landmines. A biologist noticed that the elephants soon learned to avoid them. In a study in South Africa, researchers found that some elephants could detect TNT samples with a high sensitivity, missing only one out of 97 samples. They were 5% more likely to indicate the presence of TNT than dogs and 6% less likely to miss a sample (the more important measure of success). While researchers do not plan to send elephants to minefields, they could sniff samples collected by unmanned vehicles in a preliminary screening of potential minefields.

==== Plants ====
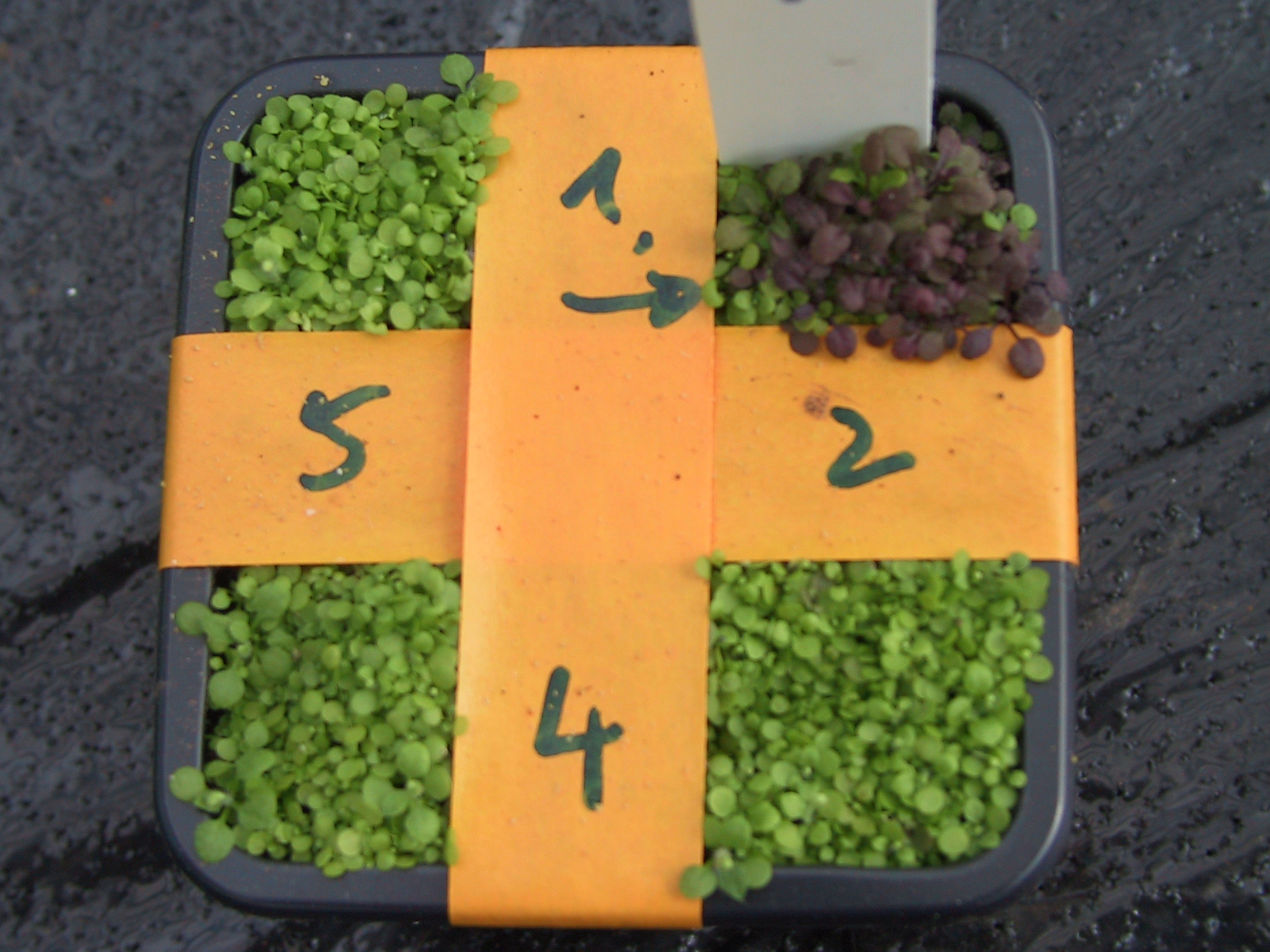
Genetically modified thale cress turns brown in the presence of nitrous oxide.

Thale cress, a member of the mustard family and one of the most-studied plants in the world, normally turns red under harsh conditions. But using a combination of natural mutations and genetic manipulation, scientists from Danish biotechnology company Aresa Biodetection created a strain that only changes color in response to nitrate and nitrite, chemicals that are released when TNT breaks down. The plants would aid demining by indicating the presence of mines through color change, and could either be sown from aircraft or by people walking through demined corridors in minefields. In September 2008, Aresa Biodetection ceased development of the method, but in 2012 a group at Cairo University announced plans for large-scale testing of a method that would combine detection using Arabidopsis with bacteria that would corrode metal in mines and rose periwinkle, sugar beet, or tobacco plants that would absorb nitrogen from the TNT that was released.

An inherent problem with sensing nitrate and nitrites is that they are already in the soil naturally. There are no natural chemical sensors for TNT, so some researchers are attempting to modify existing receptors so they respond to TNT-derived chemicals that do not occur naturally.

==== Bacteria ====
A bacterium, known as a bioreporter, has been genetically engineered to fluoresce under ultraviolet light in the presence of TNT. Tests involving spraying such bacteria over a simulated minefield successfully located mines. In the field, this method could allow for searching hundreds of acres in a few hours, which is much faster than other techniques, and could be used on a variety of terrain types. While there are some false positives (especially near plants and water drainage), even three ounces of TNT were detectable using these bacteria. Unfortunately, there is no strain of bacteria capable of detecting RDX, another common explosive, and the bacteria may not be visible under desert conditions. Also, well-constructed munitions that have not had time to corrode may be undetectable using this method.

==== Chemical ====
As part of the "Dog's nose" program run by the Defense Advanced Research Projects Agency (DARPA), several kinds of non-biological detectors were developed in an attempt to find a cheap alternative to dogs. These include spectroscopic, piezoelectric, electrochemical, and fluorescent detectors. Of these, the fluorescent detector has the lowest detection limit. Two glass slides are coated with a fluorescent polymer. Explosive chemicals bind to the polymer and reduce the amount of fluorescent light emitted. This has been developed by Nomadics, Inc. into a commercial product, Fido, that has been incorporated in robots deployed in Iraq and Afghanistan.

Chemical sensors can be made lightweight and portable and can operate at a walking pace. However, they do not have a 100% probability of detection, and the explosive vapors they detect have often drifted away from the source. Effects of environmental conditions are not well understood. As of 2016, dogs outperformed the best technological solutions.

=== Bulk explosive detection ===
Although some of the methods for detecting explosive vapors are promising, the transport of explosive vapors through the soil is still not well understood. An alternative is to detect the bulk explosive inside a landmine by interacting with the nuclei of certain elements. In landmines, explosives contain 18–38% nitrogen by weight, 16–37% carbon and 2–3% hydrogen. By contrast, soils contain less than 0.07% nitrogen, 0.1–9% carbon and 0–50% hydrogen. Methods for interrogating the nuclei include nuclear quadrupole resonance and neutron methods. Detection can be difficult because the "bulk" may amount to less than 100 grams and a much greater signal may come from the surrounding earth and cosmic rays.

==== Nuclear quadrupole resonance ====
Nuclear quadrupole resonance (NQR) spectroscopy uses radio frequency (RF) waves to determine the chemical structure of compounds. It can be regarded as nuclear magnetic resonance "without the magnet". The frequencies at which resonances occur are primarily determined by the quadrupole moment of the nuclear charge density and the gradient of the electric field due to valence electrons in the compound. Each compound has a unique set of resonance frequencies. Unlike a metal detector, NQR does not have false positives from other objects in the ground. Instead, the main performance issue is the low ratio of the signal to the random thermal noise in the detector. This signal-to-noise ratio can be increased by increasing the interrogation time, and in principle the probability of detection can be near unity and the probability of false alarm low. Unfortunately, the most common explosive material (TNT) has the weakest signal. Also, its resonance frequencies are in the AM radio band and can be overwhelmed by radio broadcasts. Finally, it cannot see through metal casing or detect liquid explosives. Nevertheless, it is considered a promising technology for confirming results from other scanners with a low false alarm rate.

==== Neutrons ====
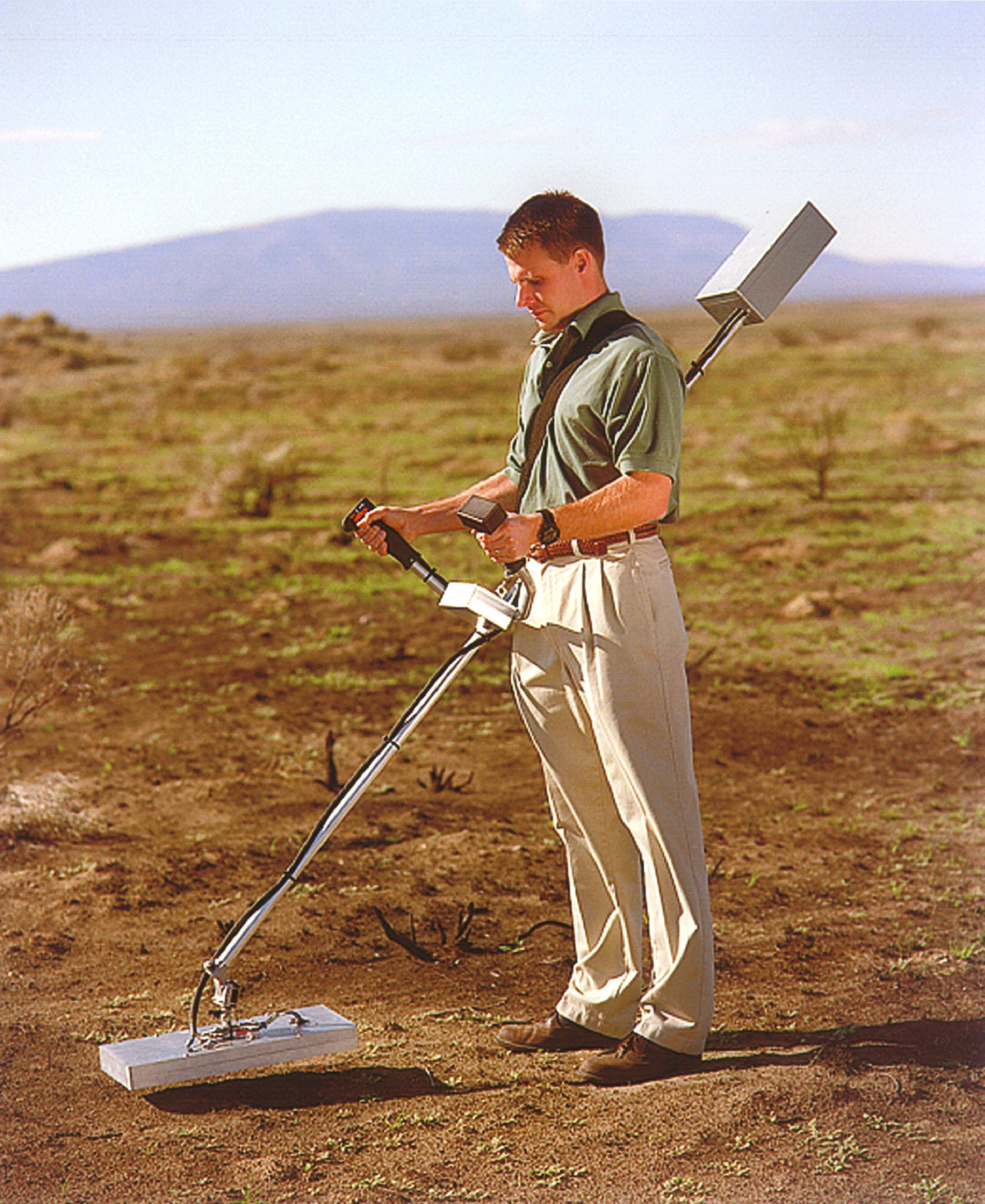
PNNL engineer testing a timed neutron detector

Since the late 1940s, a lot of research has examined the potential of nuclear techniques for detecting landmines and there have been several reviews of the technology. According to a RAND study in 2003, "Virtually every conceivable nuclear reaction has been examined, but ... only a few have potential for mine detection." In particular, reactions that emit charged particles can be eliminated because they do not travel far in the ground, and methods involving transmission of neutrons through the medium (useful in applications such as airport security) are not feasible because the detector and receiver cannot be placed on opposite sides. This leaves emission of radiation from targets and scattering of neutrons. For neutron detectors to be portable, they must be able to detect landmines efficiently with low-intensity beams so that little shielding is needed to protect human operators. One factor that determines the efficiency is the cross section of the nuclear reaction; if it is large, a neutron does not have to come as close to a nucleus to interact with it.

One possible source of neutrons is spontaneous fission from a radioactive isotope, most commonly californium-252. Neutrons can also be generated using a portable particle accelerator (a sealed neutron tube) that promotes the fusion of deuterium and tritium, producing helium-4 and a neutron. This has the advantage that tritium, being less radiotoxic than californium-252, would pose a smaller threat to humans in the event of an accident such as an explosion. These sources emit fast neutrons with an energy of 14.1 million electron volts (MeV) from the neutron tube and 0–13 MeV from californium-252. If low-energy (thermal) neutrons are needed, they must be passed through a moderator.

In one method, thermal neutron analysis (TNA), thermal neutrons are captured by a nucleus, releasing energy in the form of a gamma ray. One such reaction, nitrogen-14 captures a neutron to make nitrogen-15, releasing a gamma ray with energy 10.835 MeV. No other naturally occurring isotope emits a photon with such a high energy, and there are few transitions that emit nearly as much energy, so detectors do not need high energy resolution. Also, nitrogen has a large cross section for thermal neutrons. The Canadian Army has deployed a multi-detector vehicle, the Improved Landmine Detection System, with a TNA detector to confirm the presence of anti-tank mines that were spotted by other instruments. However, the time required to detect antipersonnel mines is prohibitively long, especially if they are deeper than a few centimeters, and a human-portable detector is considered unachievable.

An alternative neutron detector uses fast neutrons that enter the ground and are moderated by it; the flux of thermal neutrons scattered back is measured. Hydrogen is a very effective moderator of neutrons, so the signal registers hydrogen anomalies. In an antipersonnel mine, hydrogen accounts for 25–35% of the atoms in the explosive and 55–65% in the casing. Hand-held devices are feasible and several systems have been developed. However, because they are sensitive only to atoms and cannot distinguish different molecular structures, they are easily fooled by water, and are generally not useful in soils with water content over 10%. However, if a distributed pulsed neutron source is used, it may be possible to distinguish wet soil from explosives by their decay constants. A "Timed Neutron Detector" based on this method has been created by the Pacific Northwest National Laboratory and has won design awards.

=== Acoustic/seismic ===
Acoustic/seismic methods involve creating sound waves above the ground and detecting the resulting vibrations at the surface. Usually the sound is generated by off-the-shelf loudspeakers or electrodynamic shakers, but some work has also been done with specialized ultrasound speakers that send tight beams into the ground. The measurements can be made with non-contact sensors such as microphones, radar, ultrasonic devices and laser Doppler vibrometers.

A landmine has a distinctive acoustic signature because it is a container. Sound waves alternately compress and expand the enclosed volume of air and there is a lag between the volume change and the pressure that increases as the frequency decreases. The landmine and the soil above it act like two coupled springs with a nonlinear response that does not depend on the composition of the container. Such a response is not seen in most other buried objects such as roots, rocks, concrete or other man-made objects (unless they are hollow items such as bottles and cans) so the detection method has few false positives.

As well as having a low false positive rate, acoustic/seismic methods respond to different physical properties than other detectors, so they could be used in tandem for a richer source of information. They are also unaffected by moisture and weather, but have trouble in frozen ground and vegetation. However, because sound attenuates in the ground, the technology has shown difficulty finding mines "deeper than approximately one mine diameter". It is also slow, with scans taking between 125 and 1000 seconds per square meter, but increasing the number of sensors can speed the scan up proportionately.

=== Unmanned ground vehicles ===
Unmanned ground vehicles (UGVs) such as demining robots help protect the controller by distancing them from potential mines. Being electric they need an electrical source to charge batteries and be robust enough to withstand close detonations. In Ukraine in 2023, under the Brave1 platform, an "iron caterpillar" that uses a robotic vehicle with a cheap disposable mine activation roller as a form of all terrain mine activator, is in operation.

=== Unmanned aerial vehicle ===
Unmanned aerial vehicles (UAVs), or drones, can be used to detect mines. The system that includes the drone, the person operating the machine, and the communication system is called an unmanned aerial (or aircraft) system (UAS). In the past decade, the use of such systems for demining has grown rapidly.

Drones equipped with cameras have been used to map areas during non-technical survey, to monitor changes in land use resulting from demining, to identify patterns of mine placement and predict new locations, and to plan access routes to minefields. One such system, a fixed-wing UAV made by SenseFly, is being tested by GICHD in Angola. A Spanish company, CATUAV, equipped a drone with optical sensors to scan potential minefields in Bosnia and Herzegovina; their design was a finalist in the 2015 Drones for Good competition. From February to October 2019, Humanity & Inclusion, an international NGO, is testing drones for non-technical survey in northern Chad.

Several ideas for detecting landmines are in the research and development phase. A research team at the University of Bristol is working on adding multispectral imaging (for detecting chemical leaks) to drones. Geophysicists at Binghamton University are testing the use of thermal imaging to locate "butterfly mines", which were dropped from airplanes in Afghanistan and mostly sit on the surface. At DTU Space, an institute in the Technical University of Denmark, researchers are designing a drone with magnetometer suspended underneath it, with the initial goal of clearing mines from World War II so power cables can be connected to offshore wind turbines.

The Dutch Mine Kafon project, led by designer Massoud Hassani, is working on an autonomous drone called the Mine Kafon Drone. It uses robotic attachments in a three-step process. First, a map is generated using a 3-D camera and GPS. Next, a metal detector pinpoints the location of mines. Finally, a robotic gripping arm places a detonator above each mine and the drone triggers it from a distance.

Drone programs must overcome challenges such as getting permission to fly, finding safe takeoff and landing spots, and getting access to electricity for charging the batteries. In addition, there are concerns about privacy, and a danger that drones could be weaponized by hostile forces.

A drone developed in 2023 through the Ukrainian Brave1 platform to detect mines ST-1 is in use.

== Personal protective equipment ==
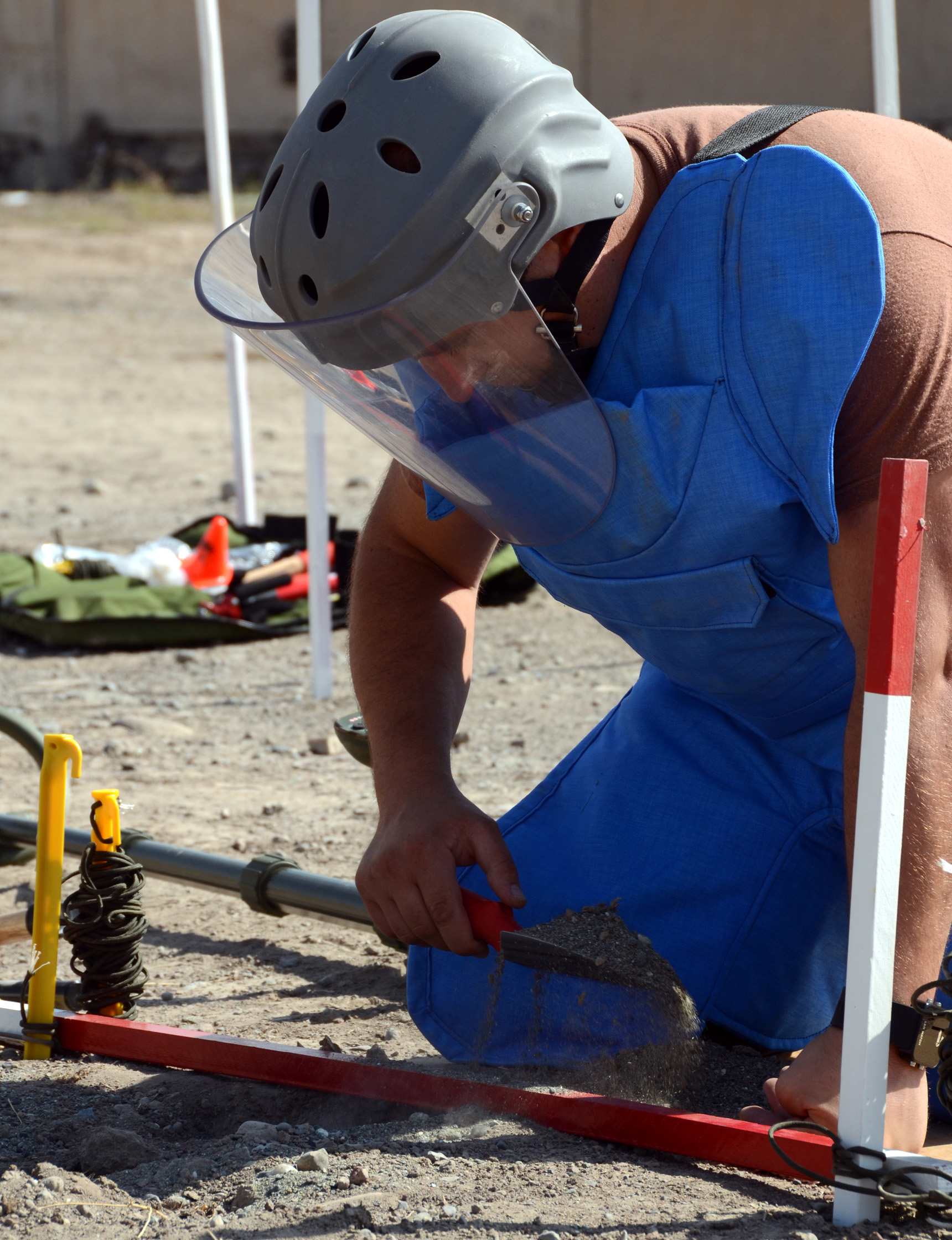
Protective equipment including helmet, visor and body armor with throat protection

Deminers may be issued personal protective equipment (PPE) such as helmets, visors, armoured gloves, vests and boots, in an attempt to protect them if a mine is set off by accident. The IMAS standards require that some parts of the body (including the chest, abdomen, groin and eyes) be protected against a blast from 240 grams of TNT at a distance of 60 centimeters; head protection is recommended. Although it says blast resistant boots may be used, the benefits are unproven and the boots may instill a false sense of security.

The recommended equipment can afford significant protection against antipersonnel blast mines, but the IMAS standards acknowledge that they are not adequate for fragmentation and antitank mines. Heavier armor increases protection at the expense of comfort and mobility. PPE selection is a balance between protection should a blast occur and being sufficiently unhindered to prevent a blast in the first place. Other ways of managing risk include better detectors, remote-controlled vehicles to remove fragmentation mines, long-handled rakes for excavation and unmanned aerial vehicles to scout the hazards before approaching.

== Removal methods ==
=== Humanitarian ===
Once a mine is found, the most common methods of removing it are to manually defuse it (a slow and dangerous process) or blow it up with more explosives (dangerous and costly). Research programs have explored alternatives that destroy the mine without exploding it, using chemicals or heat.

The most common explosive material, TNT, is very stable, not burnable with a match and highly resistant to acids or common oxidizing agents. However, some chemicals use an autocatalytic reaction to destroy it. Diethylenetriamine (DETA) and TNT spontaneously ignite when they come in contact with each other. One delivery system involves a bottle of DETA placed over a mine; a bullet shot through both brings them in contact and the TNT is consumed within minutes. Other chemicals that can be used for this purpose include pyridine, diethylamine and pyrole. They do not have the same effect on explosives such as RDX and PETN.

Thermal destruction methods generate enough heat to burn TNT, such as using leftover rocket propellant from the NASA Space Shuttle missions. Thiokol, the company that built the engines for the shuttles, developed a flare with the propellant. Placed next to a mine and activated remotely, it reaches temperatures exceeding 1,927 °C (3,501 °F), burning a hole through the landmine casing and consuming the explosive. These flares have been used by the US Navy in Kosovo and Jordan. Another device uses a solid state reaction to create a liquid that penetrates the case and starts the explosive burning.

=== Military ===
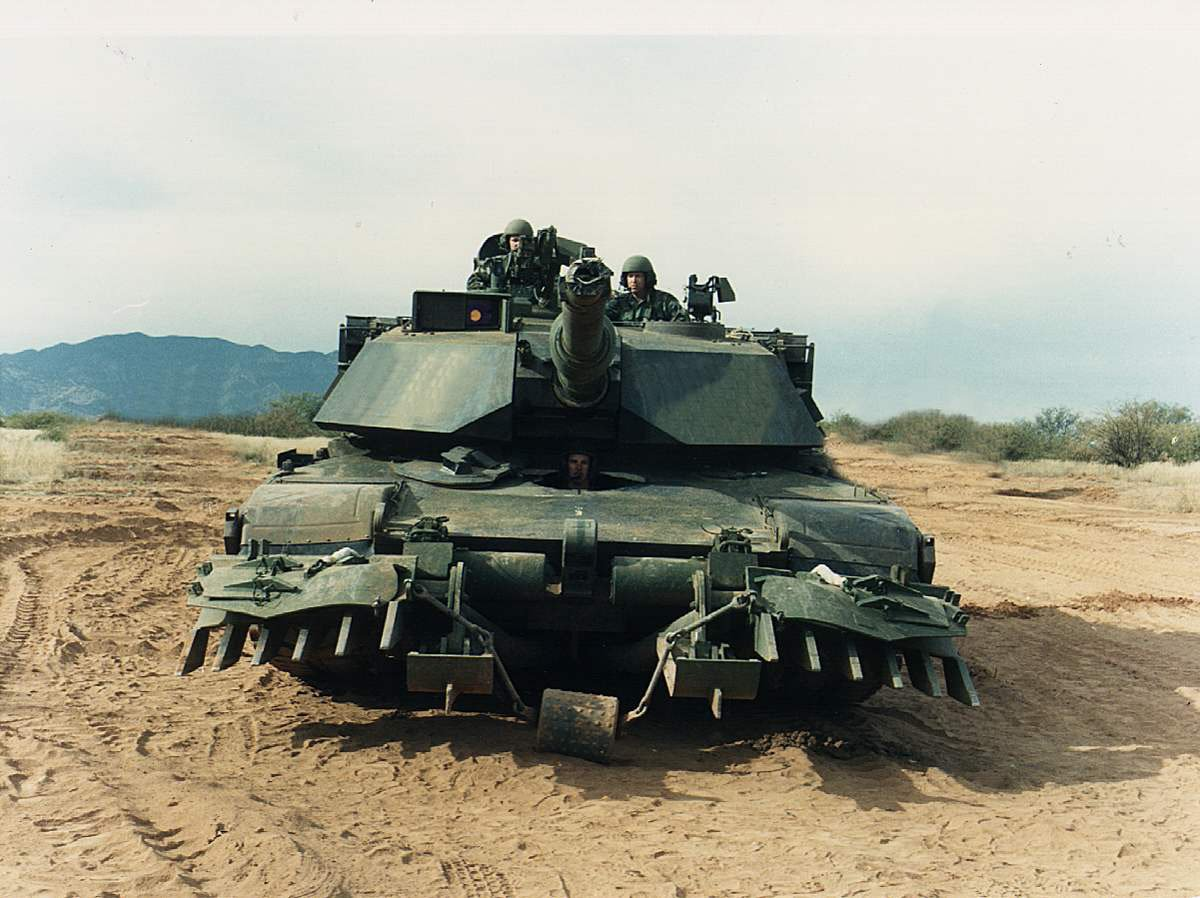
US Army M1 Abrams tank with mine plow

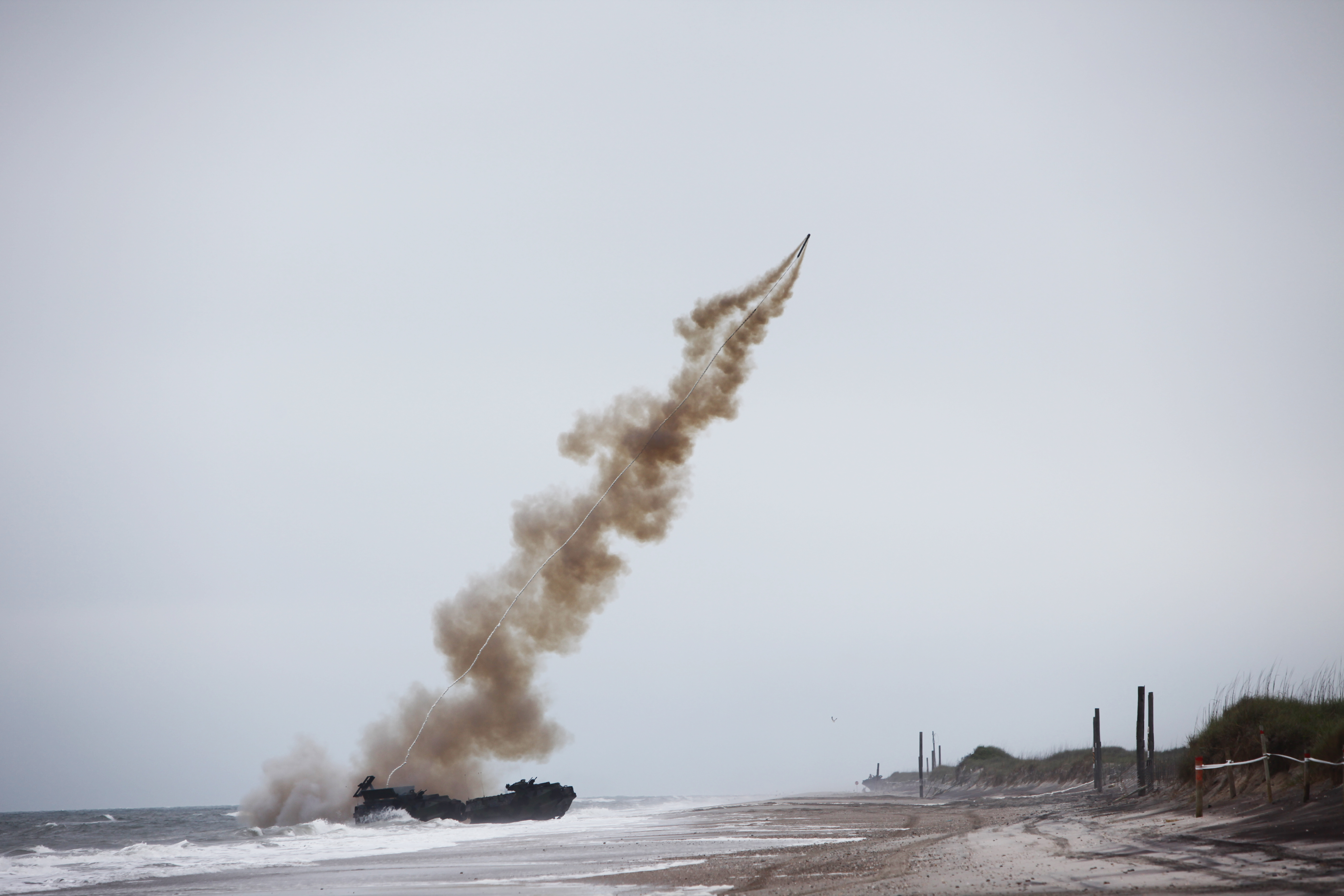
An amphibious assault vehicle fires a line charge to clear beachhead during an exercise at the Camp Lejeune Marine Corps Base.

In World War II, one method used by the German SS to clear minefields was to force captured civilians to cross the minefields, which would trigger any mine they encountered. In 1987, during the Iran–Iraq War, Iran used volunteers known as the Basij to clear out minefields for the Army. More humane methods included mine plows, mounted on Sherman and Churchill tanks, and the Bangalore torpedo. Variants of these are still used today.

Mine plows use a specially designed shovel to unearth mines and shove them to the side, clearing a path. They are quick and effective for clearing a lane for vehicles and are still attached to some types of tank and remotely operated vehicles. The mines are moved but not deactivated, so mine plows are not used for humanitarian demining.

The mine-clearing line charge, successor to the Bangalore torpedo, clears a path through a minefield by triggering the mines with a blast wave. Several examples include the anti-personnel obstacle breaching system and the Python minefield breaching system, a hose-pipe filled with explosives that is carried across a minefield by a rocket.

In the 2000s fuel-air explosive (FAE) technology has been increasingly used for demining operations, offering an effective method for clearing minefields and neutralizing IEDs. One notable example of this application is the Rafael Carpet, a mine breaching system developed by Rafael Advanced Defense Systems. This system uses a series of rockets to disperse a fuel spray over a targeted area, creating a fuel-air explosive cloud that detonates to clear mines over a wide area, thus providing a rapid and safe path for military operations.

== See also ==
- Aftermath: The Remnants of War
- Bomb disposal
- Center for International Stabilization and Recovery
- Counter-IED efforts
- Land mines in Latin America and the Caribbean
- Mines Advisory Group
- Swiss Foundation for Mine Action (FSD)
- Mine clearance organization
- MineWolf Systems
- Fares Scale of Injuries due to Cluster Munitions
- Ottawa Treaty
