= CATUAV =

Spanish UAV manufacturer

- Company type: Private
- Industry: Unmanned aerial vehicles services
- Founded: 2007
- Founder: Jordi Santacana
- Headquarters: Moià, Spain
- Key people: Jordi Salvador, Marc Beltran
- Products: Atmos, Argos, Furos, Stratos
- Website: www.catuav.com

CATUAV S.L. is a technology-based private company that offers aerial services using unmanned aerial vehicles (UAV). Its headquarters are located in the Moià airfield in the BCN Drone Center, 40 km north of Barcelona, Spain.

== History ==
CATUAV is a company involved in developing UAV technologies for aerial image acquisition purposes in Europe. The first UAV prototype was built in 2003, as a new business line within Aeroplans Blaus S.L., a company dedicated to experimental and sport aviation equipment. During this period some surveillance UAV systems were developed as part of a strategic agreement with Proytecsa and Indra.

In 2007 the UAV business line had grown enough to create a new company, CATUAV, founded to provide all the services offered with these systems. In 2008 the company signed a strategic agreement with AURENSIS, a Telespazio/Finmeccanica company. Since then, CATUAV has performed more than 100 commercial missions in the civil market.

== Technologies ==
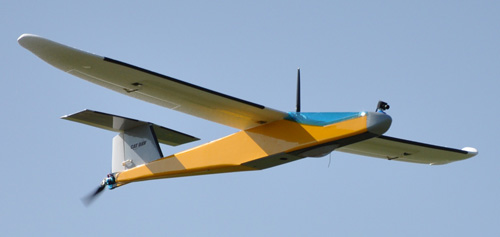
The Atmos6 unmanned aerial vehicle, for civil applications

Since 2003 CATUAV has developed different technologies in order to perform its services:

- Atmos series: Mini-UAV that weighs less than 2 kg and can carry a payload of up to 500g. Powered with an electric motor this is a platform that is used primarily for mapping projects. The current version is Atmos-6, which is an evolution of the five previous models (from Atmos-1 to Atmos-5)
- Furos: A medium-range UAV that thanks to its gasoline engine can fly for six hours and cover distances of over 400 km guided by autopilot. The cargo bay has ample space for payload in the central area of the fuselage and the nose has a modular system designed to accommodate thermal cameras. The high power of its engine and its special streamlined design allows to take off and land in very little space from unprepared terrain. It can reach a top speed of 145 km / h and climb to 3,000 m in less than ten minutes. Equipped with a new video link and long-range data link, can be manually controlled to 20 km or undertake missions on their pre-programmed autopilot. It weighs less than 11 kg and can carry a payload of up to 5 kg (including fuel).
- Argos: Evolution of the Furos, this UAV weighs less than 12 kg and can carry a payload up to 6.25 kg (including fuel). Powered with a fuel engine, it can fly for up to 14 hours, making it CATUAV's longest enduring platform. It has a big cargo bay that is easy to adapt to different payloads and a long endurance to get the maximum of each flight. ARGOS is an easy to deploy, easy to fly mid-range platform that has a conventional landing gear for taking off from very short runways or a special hook for catapult launching when there is no runway available. Wings are foldable in less than five minutes for easy transportation even in small vehicles.
- Mineos: a versatile mini-UAV with a silent electrical propulsion system. Its small size allows performing a great variety of missions, it is ideal for video surveillance, photogrammetry, filming and as a platform for scientific and remote sensing applications. It has GPS navigation system, automatic stabilizer system and emergency locator transmitter. The new MINEOS is foldable and easy to carry in any vehicle.
- Telemetry data link: CATUAV has its own telemetry protocol that ensures the security and safety of all the communications. The UAVs can be controlled in a 15 km radius with a radio frequency link. This range can be extended using a satellite link.
- Ground control station: In order to operate the UAV, CATUAV has developed a towable ground station with all the equipment required to deploy and operate the UAVs and read all the telemetry data. It also has a portable ground station for missions that do not have path access.
- Mission software: CATUAV is operating its own planning and control mission software, specially adapted to its UAV platforms and application requirements.

CATUAV also operates third-party products that play a role in its activity, such as:

- Falcon 8 blades multirotor.
- Thermoteknix: a high resolution thermal camera.
- EnsoMosaic software: this software package allows the creation of orthophoto mosaics and digital elevation model (DEM).

== Services ==
Some services the company offers include:

=== Orthophotos ===
Orthophotos are aerial photographies that have been geometrically corrected such that the scale is uniform, having each pixel an associated geographic coordinate. Orthophotos have the same lack of distortion as maps, so they are an accurate representation of the Earth's surface that can be used to measure distances.

Using photogrammetric software, the aerial images acquired with UAV systems can be rectified and merged in order to create orthorectified image mosaics of the desired extension. The orthophotos have a resolution between 5 cm to 2 m/píxel. In one flight, areas up to 1000 hectares can be detected.

The generation of the orthophotos is made using software that automatically applies photogrammetric principles to rectify the images. As input, it needs georeferenced aerial images and the usage of a calibrated camera. This process leads to submeter precisions in the full orthophoto extension, which can still be increased adding manual control points.

The UAV systems can be equipped with multiple cameras, allowing us the acquisition of images in multiple spectral bands: visible, near infrared, thermal, hyperspectral. Those images can be postprocessed (for example to compute vegetation index) and orthophotos can be generated for each spectral band, resulting in a huge range of applications:

- Precision agriculture
- Forestry management
- Environmental studies
- Hydrology
- Landmine detection
- Archaeological work
- Town illumination management
- Light pollution studies
- Fire detection
- Energy efficiency studies
- Waste management
- Surveillance

=== Digital elevation models for GIS applications ===
A Digital Elevation Model (DEM) is a continuous 3D representation of a terrain surface area that has been geometrically corrected, so it can be used to measure distances and heights. Two main kinds of DEM can be generated:

- Digital Terrain Model (DTM): 3D representation of the terrain base surface without vegetation and artificial objects.
- Digital Surface Model (DSM): 3D representation of all elements in the area.

CATUAV systems generate a DTM in every flight as a product of the rectification process. From this previous DTM, with more intensive software procedures, a dense Point Cloud 3D model can be generated, from which a high-resolution DSM can be derived.

Obtaining in the same flight an orthophoto plus a DEM, provides a high quality and low-cost product that can be used to support any topography and cartography work. With further processing, dense Point Cloud and DSM can also be obtained, which leads to applications in multiple fields:

- Topography
- Mining
- Forestry management
- Civil Works
- Geology

=== Non-metric, oblique aerial images ===
If the onboard camera pose has a certain angle from the vertical direction, oblique images are obtained, which allows the obtaining of an aerial perspective of the scene. Thanks to the use of an onboard GPS and inertial system, each image acquired can be automatically georeferenced. The aerial perspective obtained with this kind of images makes it possible to see the scene from a bird's point of view and leads to numerous applications where they are useful:

- Civil works management
- Power lines maintenance
- Energy efficiency in buildings
- 360º panorama creation

=== Atmospheric data ===
The systems can be equipped with any desired sensors in order to obtain atmospheric data such as temperature, pressure, CO_{2} concentration, etc. This data can be used to perform atmospheric prospection and environmental studies.

== Featured missions ==
- Lorca earthquake: In May 2011 CATUAV performed a series of flights over Lorca (Spanish town in Murcia) 38 hours after it was struck by a strong earthquake. The high resolution orthophoto created from the town allowed the emergency services to evaluate and quantify the damages in buildings. This is the first known application of a mini-UAV in a civil emergency in Europe.
- SAFEDEM project: CATUAV is participating in the SAFEDEM project of the ESA to develop a system capable of helping in the demining works in Bosnia.

== Awards ==
CATUAV has been awarded the Galileo Masters European GNSS Agency (GSA) special topic prize and regional prize in 2011 for its TCAS for mini UAV project.

Other awards:

- ESNC Regional Prize
- Innovacat (2012)
- Premi Medi Ambient (2012)
- Drone social innovation award
- Nit de la robotica (2015)
