= Land mines in Latin America and the Caribbean =

Land mines in Latin America and the Caribbean are a by-product of the Cold War-era conflicts starting off in the 19th century. Contrary to the requirements of generally accepted international law, the minefields of Latin America and the Caribbean (including Central America), were usually unmarked and unrecorded on maps. Once placed, mines remain active for decades, waiting the pressure of an unwary foot to detonate. As of 2023, within all of the Americas the only nations not to ratify the AP Mine Ban Convention are Cuba and the United States.

== Background ==
With an estimated 100,000 land mines buried across Central America, mainly in Nicaragua, there was grave concern over their location and removal or deactivation as the Cold War began to wind down. In August 1991 Nicaragua asked the Organization of American States (OAS) for assistance, and the Secretary General forwarded the request to the Inter-American Defense Board (IADB), which sent a group of staff officers to Nicaragua to assess the situation. A Demining Plan was developed under which the IADB, working with U.S. technical experts, would supervise the training of teams of Nicaraguan demining personnel. The Nicaraguan program operated for six months in 1993 before being suspended due to funding limitations (it was reinitiated in 1996). In those first six months, the teams destroyed almost 3,000 mines.

== Demining operations ==
Subsequently, demining operations have been launched in Costa Rica, Honduras and Guatemala. The primary responsibility for the program lay with the OAS' Unit for the Promotion of Democracy, with the IADB providing technical support and planning assistance. The goal was to make Central America essentially a mine-free area as soon as possible.

=== Colombia ===
Colombia has been under internal conflict between heavily armed groups which has led to an increase in landmines being placed throughout the conflict zones of the country. Some estimates are Colombia remains one of the most heavily afflicted countries in the world littered by landmines. Not all landmine laden areas are easily marked or identifiable for tourists and visitors in rural and remote places. Governing administrations have considered efforts in supporting removal though local groups have frustrate these efforts through intentional placement of additional armaments.

=== Costa Rica ===
Demining activities began in Costa Rica along the border of Nicaragua in October 1996. With support from the OAS, the Ministry of Public Security has undertaken both mine clearance operations and a public awareness component to prevent accidents involving the civilian population. To date more than 300 of the estimated 1,000 existing mines and unexploded devices have been found and destroyed. Because Costa Rica possesses no stockpiled mines, completion of demining operations will convert it to a mine-free nation.

=== Cuba ===
Around 1960s both the governments of the United States and rebels in Cuba placed close to 50,000 land mine devices in a 17-mile strip surrounding the military base at Guantanamo Bay. The devices have injured U.S. military personnel over the years and also Cubans attempting safe haven at the base.

=== Honduras ===
In Honduras, demining operations began in September 1995, and since that time, ten operational modules have been supported, resulting in the destruction of more than 2,200 mines. As a result of these operations, numerous tracts of land have been reclaimed and turned over to local authorities for development. In November 2000, Honduras became the first of the OAS Member States to eliminate its stockpiled antipersonnel mines when the Honduran Army destroyed its reserves of nearly 8,000 mines.

=== Guatemala ===
Following the signing of a peace agreement in Guatemala, the OAS provided assistance in developing a mine and unexploded ordnance clearance program, which was launched in 1998. The Guatemalan National Commission for Peace and Demining has overall responsibility for the national project. Also participating in the program are the Volunteer Firemen's Corps, the Guatemalan Army and demobilized members of the Guatemalan National Revolutionary Union. Operations in Guatemala are somewhat unusual within the OAS program, as the primary threat comes from the approximately 8,000 unexploded devices, including mortar and artillery shells, aerial bombs and hand grenades, which are scattered throughout Guatemalan territory. The clearance process requires extensive cooperation among the three operational components, as well as a concerted effort to communicate with the population of affected zones in order to locate and destroy hazardous items.

=== Nicaragua ===
The civil war (Nicaraguan Revolution) of the 1980s left 16 of Nicaragua's 17 provinces affected by anti-personnel mines. These were particularly rural and impoverished areas. After having cleared over 179,000 anti-personnel mines from its territory and half a million pieces of unexploded ordnance, Nicaragua declared itself free of landmines in 2010. It did so supported by a number of organisations including the OAS. There are however, at least 1,200 surviving victims of these weapons.

== See also ==
- Unexploded ordnance
- Ottawa Treaty

== Sources ==
- Inter-American Defense Board web site: https://web.archive.org/web/20061208133725/http://www.jid.org/en/programs/demining/
- "Recobrando tierras condenadas", Americas (OAS), October 1997, pp. 53–55
- "Demining in Central America", OAS/UPD Newsletter, July 1997, pp. 1 & 4.
