= Aresa Biodetection =

Danish biotechnology firm

Aresa Biodetection was a biotechnology firm based in Copenhagen, Denmark which is best known for genetically modifying a common weed to indicate the presence of land mines. The company created a thale cress whose leaves turn brown in the presence of nitrogen dioxide, a compound which is leached into the soil by unexploded land mines. Previously identification of land mines was done by probing or by metal detectors. Use of these plants as indicators significantly reduces the risks to humans and animals who have previously probed the soil to locate mines and finds mines in plastic housings that cannot be found with metal detectors.

In 2008 Aresa Biodetection announced it had stopped further development of genetically engineered thale cress. In 2009, Aresa Biodetection had no sales and only one employee.
