= Task Force Kandahar =

Task force

- Active: 2005–2011
- Country: Canada; United States
- Allegiance: NATO
- Role: Combat operations
- Part of: Regional Command South
- Headquarters: Kandahar Airfield

Commanders
- Commander TF 5-10: Brigadier-General Dean Milner

Insignia
- TF 5-08

Task Force Kandahar (TFK) was the formation conducting the International Security Assistance Force (ISAF) mission in Kandahar Province under ISAF Regional Command South. When it concluded its mission in summer 2011, the formation included a Canadian Armed Forces battle group, three U.S. Army battalions (two of infantry and one of military police), an engineer regiment, a signal squadron, Operational Mentor and Liaison Teams (OMLTs), and contributions to Operational Mentor and Advisory Teams (OMATs) and the Police Operational Mentor and Liaison Team (P-OMLT).

== Origin ==
=== Move from Kabul ===
On 29 November 2005, the Canadian base Camp Julien in southwest Kabul officially closed. Canadian Forces (CF) components that were in Kabul under Operation Athena were relocated to Kandahar as part of the U.S.-led campaign against terrorism known as Operation Enduring Freedom (OEF). The Canadian component was initially designated Operation Archer. The Canadian Provincial Reconstruction Team (PRT) had already been at Camp Nathan Smith in Kandahar since August 2005. The PRT integrated elements from the Canadian Forces (CF), Foreign Affairs Canada (FAC), the Canadian International Development Agency (CIDA), and the Royal Canadian Mounted Police (RCMP).

=== Task Force Afghanistan ===
In early 2006, Canada's contribution to Operation Archer increased to approximately 2300 personnel. The then-designated Task Force Afghanistan also included a Canadian-led multinational brigade headquarters, designated Task Force Aegis, and Canadian battle group designated Task Force Orion centred on 1st Battalion Princess Patricia's Canadian Light Infantry (1 PPCLI). This time frame also saw the introduction of the M777 howitzer as part of the task force in February 2006. The period was highlighted by Operation Mountain Thrust and Operation Zahara (also designated the First Battle of Panjwaii). 1 PPCLI was given the Commander-in-Chief Unit Commendation from the Governor General of Canada for "exceptional determination and courage during relentless combat in Afghanistan, from January to August 2006". On 31 July 2006, with the expansion of the International Security Assistance Force (ISAF) mandate, US-led Coalition forces handed command of the southern region of Afghanistan to Regional Command South. With the transfer of command authority, the majority of Canadian Forces in Afghanistan came again under Operation Athena.

== Evolution of Task Force Kandahar ==
=== Task Force 3-06 (Operation Athena Rotation 2) ===
On 19 August 2006, the 1st Battalion The Royal Canadian Regiment Battle Group (1RCR BG) assumed command of the Kandahar Province area of operations from Task Force Orion. In early September 2006 the task force lead Operation Medusa with the aim to clear Taliban insurgents from a fortified position in Pashmul. For the operation, the battle group was partnered with forces from the United States, the Netherlands, the United Kingdom, Denmark and Afghanistan. The Battle of Pashmul marked the first time NATO had engaged in combat operations at the battle group-level. In the citation for the Commander-in-Chief Unit Commendation, the battle group had succeeded "where larger forces had failed, they prevented the enemy from realizing their goals of capturing the city and weakening international resolve and cohesion". An Operational Mentor and Liaison Team (OMLT) was formed to work with the 1st Brigade of the 205 Atul (Hero) Corps (1/250 Corps), based in Kandahar Province. This surge, along with the deployment of a squadron of Leopard 1 tanks from Lord Strathcona's Horse (Royal Canadians), CFB Edmonton, increased the number Canadian Forces in Afghanistan to 2500. With Brigadier-General Timothy Grant assuming command of the Canadian elements in Kandahar in November 2006 and the construction of Provincial Operations Centre at Kandahar Airfield, the framework for Joint Task Force Afghanistan (JTF-Afg) was in place.

=== Task Force 1-07 (Operation Athena Rotation 3) ===
Although the battle group for TF 1-07 was based on 2nd Battalion The Royal Canadian Regiment (2RCR) from CFB Gagetown, the headquarters for Task Force Kandahar was primarily force generated from Land Force Atlantic Area, taking on a greater responsibility than previously rotations' Nation Command Elements. The commander for Task Force Kandahar was also designated Commander Joint Task Force Afghanistan, ultimately responsible for all Canadian Forces personnel and assets deployed in southwest Asia. The task force contributed to Operation Achilles mid-April to mid-March 2007, the clearing of Taliban fighters from Helmand Province. This offensive action was the largest NATO operation in Afghanistan up to this point. On 15 May 2007, the Canadian OMLT took over full responsibility for the mentoring of 1/250 Corps from the United States Army. In July 2007, the Government of Canada increased its diplomatic presence in Kandahar by appointing Michel de Salaberry as the Representative of Canada Kandahar (RoCK).

=== Task Force 3-07 (Operation Athena Rotation 4) ===
Both the headquarters and the battle group were generated from 5 Canadian Mechanized Brigade Group (5 CMBG) with Brigadier-General Guy Laroche as the commander. This rotation of the headquarters saw the "digitizing" of the task force, modernizing the command and control information systems within the task force and the standing up of Task Force Kandahar Signal Squadron. The 3rd Battalion Royal 22^{e} Régiment Battle Group (3 R22^{e}R BG), which was awarded the Commander-in-Chief Unit Commendation, was "instrumental in dismantling improvised explosive device networks, re-capturing checkpoints and returning them to Afghan control, enhancing the capacity of Afghan forces and providing guidance on community building and local governance." On 16 October 2007, the Government of Canada indicated the current mission was to end in 2011.

=== Task Force 1-08 (Operation Athena Rotation 5) ===
- Battle group – 2nd Battalion Princess Patricia's Canadian Light Infantry Battle Group
- JTF-A Reconnaissance Squadron - 12^{e} Régiment blindé du Canada, 'D' Squadron
- Provincial Reconstruction Team – B Company, 1st Battalion, Princess Patricia's Canadian Light Infantry
- Task Force Kandahar – Rotation 4 Task Force Kandahar headquarters remained (9-month tour)
- National Support Element(NSE), Supply and Transportation Company, 1 Service Battalion.
- Dates – February 2008 – September 2008

=== Task Force 5-08 ===
Based on headquarters from 2 Canadian Mechanized Brigade Group, TF 5-08 was also part of Operation Athena Rotation 5, but as the headquarters were on nine-month tours instead of the standard six, the headquarters were no longer in sync with their respective rotation. The headquarters, although it was involved with force-generation exercises with both Rotation 5 and 6, the Commander, Brigadier-General Denis Thompson, referred to the headquarters as "Rotation 5.5". On the evening of 13 June 2008, Taliban fighters executed a raid on Kandahar’s Sarposa Prison, freeing as many as 1100 prisoners (approximately 400 Taliban).

- Battle of Arghandab
- 2nd Battalion, 2nd Infantry Regiment (United States) comes under operational command of TFK for operations in Maywand.

=== Task Force 3-08 (Operation Athena Rotation 6) ===
- Battle Group – 3rd Battalion The Royal Canadian Regiment Battle Group
- Operation Shahi Tandar
- Joint Task Force Afghanistan Air Wing stands up 6 December 2008
- Dates – August 2008 – February 2009
- A-SQN Lord Strathcona’s Horse Royal Canadians (LdSH RC)

=== Task Force 5-09 ===
- Task Force Kandahar – Headquarters rotation only. Based on headquarters from 1 Canadian Mechanized Brigade Group.
- Commander – Brigadier-General Jonathan Vance
- Transfer of command authority 19 February 2009

=== Task Force 1-09 (Operation Athena Rotation 7) ===
- Battle group – 2nd Battalion Royal 22^{e} Régiment Battle Group
- Dates – March 2009 – November 2009

=== Task Force 3-09 (Operation Athena Rotation 8) ===
- Battle group – 1st Battalion Princess Patricia’s Canadian Light Infantry Battle Group
- Dates – November 2009 – May 2010

=== Task Force 6-09 ===
- Task Force Kandahar – Headquarters rotation only. Based on headquarters from 5 Canadian Mechanized Brigade Group.
- Commander – Brigadier-General Daniel Ménard. Relieved from his position, and Colonel Simon Hetherington was designated as acting commander in the interim. Brigadier-General Jonathan Vance returns in until TF 5-10.
- At the beginning of July 2010, Canadians transferred command responsibility for Kandahar, Arghandab and Zhari to U.S. forces and control for the Horn of Panjwaii directly to Regional Command South.

=== Task Force 1-10 (Operation Athena Rotation 9) ===
- Battle group – 1st Battalion The Royal Canadian Regiment Battle Group
- Dates – April 2010 – November 2010

=== Task Force 3-10 (Operation Athena Rotation 10) ===
- Battle group – 1st Battalion Royal 22^{e} Régiment Battle Group
- Dates – November 2010 – July 2011
- Last task force under combat operations mandate

=== Task Force 5-10 ===
- Task Force Kandahar – Headquarters rotation only. Based on headquarters from 2 Canadian Mechanized Brigade Group.
- Commander – Brigadier-General Dean Milner
- Last headquarters prior to Mission Transition Task Force and Operation Attention.
- Canada's combat mission in Kanadar ends 7 July 2011.

== See also ==
- Operation Athena
- Canada's role in the Afghanistan War
- Canadian Forces casualties in Afghanistan
