= Camp Mirage =

Former logistics facility in the UAE operated by the Canadian Armed Forces

Camp Mirage
- Part of Al Minhad Air Base
- Dubai

Site information
- Type: Forward logistics facility
- Controlled by: Canada

Location
- Location within Dubai
- Coordinates: 25°01′37″N 055°22′15″E

Site history
- In use: 2001-2010
- Battles/wars: Afghan War

Garrison information
- Garrison: 225-250 Canadian Forces personnel

Camp Mirage is the codename for a former Canadian Forces forward logistics facility located in Dubai, United Arab Emirates. The facility was established in late-December 2001 and, though not officially acknowledged by the Canadian Forces, is considered an "open secret". According to CTV sources, the base was closed in November 2010.

== Location ==
It was established in December 2001 to support Canadian Forces operations in southwest Asia, namely Afghanistan. The exact location of Camp Mirage and the nature of its mission(s) are not officially acknowledged by the Canadian Forces or the Government of Canada; however, it has been widely reported that the facility is located at Al Minhad Air Base, operated by the United Arab Emirates Air Force.

== Operations ==
Camp Mirage was used starting in December 2001 by the Long Range Patrol Detachment Southwest-Asia using CP-140 Aurora maritime-patrol aircraft; a time later, the CC-130 Hercules arrived. Strategic airlift aircraft in the form of the C-17 Globemaster III and CC-150 Polaris operated from CFB Trenton and other air bases in Canada, to Camp Mirage, to drop off and pick up cargo. This cargo was then transferred onto tactical airlift aircraft in the form of the C-130 Hercules and C-17 Globemaster III aircraft for the final flight to Kandahar International Airport, in Afghanistan. This final flight was believed to take a route approximately 400 nautical miles (740 km) east southeast over the Gulf of Oman until passing east of the Iran-Pakistan border before turning north over Pakistan airspace for the remaining 500 nautical miles (930 km) to Kandahar. The base also included aircraft maintenance facilities, sleeping areas, a cafeteria and a ball-hockey rink. The outdoor basketball court had overhead lights, and was used as a rally point for transient military personnel. The annual throughput at the base was reported to be 3,600,000 kilograms (7,900,000 lb) and as many as 32,500 personnel per year. The Canadian garrison at Camp Mirage ranged between 225 and 250 personnel, with ground personnel rotated every six months and CC-130 Hercules aircrew replaced every eight weeks.

== Allied forces ==
Al Minhad Air Base is also believed to be used as a logistics facility by the Australian Defence Force, the New Zealand Defence Force (almost certainly Task Group Troy), and the Military of the Netherlands. These militaries likely have their own codewords for their logistics operations based there.

== Canadian Forces non-combat fatality ==
A Canadian Forces military police non-commissioned member was found dead on July 4, 2008 in the sleeping quarters of Camp Mirage. Brendan Anthony Downey's death was the 11th non-combat fatality related to Canada's mission in Afghanistan; the incident remains under active investigation by the Canadian Forces National Investigation Service.

== 2010 closure ==
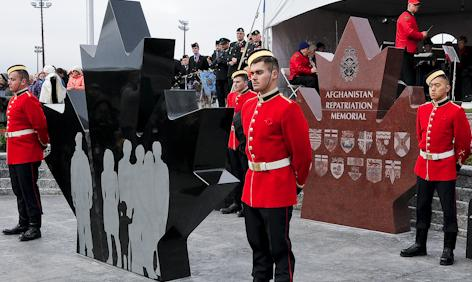
Royal Military College of Canada cadets attend unveiling of Afghanistan Repatriation Memorial, Trenton, Ontario, November 10, 2012

CTV News disclosed on October 6, 2010 that the Canadian Forces might be closing a facility at a base near Dubai, United Arab Emirates. An unnamed source in the Government of Canada stated that the Government of the United Arab Emirates had threatened to revoke the Canadian Forces' access to the facility if the Government of Canada did not grant civilian landing rights to Emirates and Etihad Airways at the Calgary International Airport and Vancouver International Airport in Canada. The Government of Canada source continued by stating that Canada was "essentially a pawn in a heavy-handed blackmail scheme and the demands were unacceptable." It was announced on October 11, 2010 that the facility would be closed. On the same day, a military transport aircraft carrying the Canadian Defence Minister and the Chief of the Defence Staff returning from a visit to Afghanistan was refused landing permission at the airbase housing Camp Mirage. The UAE responded to the incident in the media saying that the Canadian government was distorting information about the incident saying that the plane had been notified ahead of time that landing rights had been suspended, and that the Canadian government was resorting to "fear tactics" to spin a negative light on the UAE in the Canadian media.

Operations at Camp Mirage were officially ended on November 3, 2010.

== See also ==
- Canada–United Arab Emirates aviation dispute
- Camp Julien
- Canada Dry (Persian Gulf War)
- Canadian Forces casualties in Afghanistan
