= Canada Dry One =

Canadian Forces base in Qatar during the first Gulf War

Canada Dry
- Doha in Qatar

Site information
- Type: Military air base / civilian airport
- Owner: Department of National Defence
- Operator: Royal Canadian Air Force; 1990
- Civilian operator: Doha International Airport

Location
- Location in Qatar
- Coordinates: 25°15′40″N 051°33′54″E

Site history
- In use: 1959 – present

Garrison information
- Occupants: No. 409 Squadron RCAF; No. 416 Squadron RCAF; No. 439 Squadron RCAF; 3rd Battalion, The Royal Canadian Regiment

Airfield information
- Identifiers: IATA: DIA, ICAO: OTBD
- Elevation: 35 ft (11 m) AMSL
Runways
Direction	Length and surface
16/34	15,000 ft (4,600 m) Asphalt concrete

Canada Dry was the nickname for two Canadian Forces bases in Doha, Qatar, during the first Gulf War. The two bases, named Canada Dry One (10 km outside Doha) and Canada Dry Two, housed land and air elements (CF-18 - Desert Cats).

Units stationed at the base included:

- No. 409 Squadron RCAF – CF-18
- No. 416 Squadron RCAF – CF-18
- No. 439 Squadron RCAF – CF-18
- Mike Company, 3rd Battalion, The Royal Canadian Regiment

A number of CF-18 fighters were stationed in the bases and flew sorties for the coalition.

A Boeing CC-137 Husky tanker from 437 Transport Squadron also flew at the base to provide refueling for the CF-18 fighters.

== See also ==
- Camp Julien
- Camp Mirage
