= Daniel Ménard =

Canadian general and executive

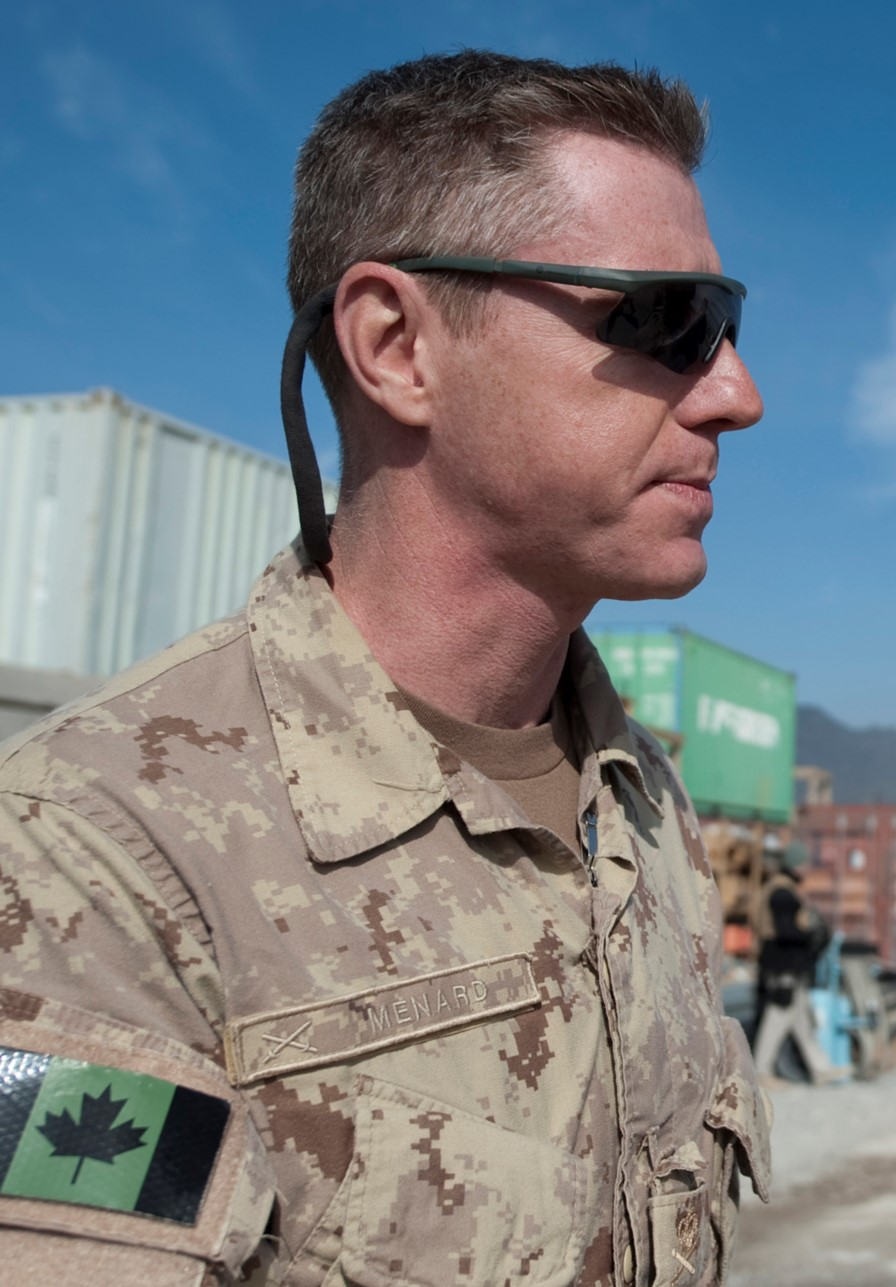
- Daniel Ménard in Afghanistan, December 2009
- Born: 1965 or 1966 (age 60–61)
- Spouse: Julie Fortin
- Children: 2
- Military career
- Allegiance: Canada
- Branch: Army
- Service years: 1984-2010
- Rank: Brigadier General
- Unit: 3rd Battalion, Royal 22nd Regiment
- Commands: Task Force Kandahar; Joint Task Force Afghanistan
- Conflicts: War in Afghanistan (2001–2021)

Daniel Ménard (born 1965/1966) is a Canadian executive and former Canadian Army brigadier general and NATO commander during the War in Afghanistan. At the time of his promotion, he was one of the youngest general officers in the Canadian Armed Forces. In 2010, he was dismissed from command of Task Force Kandahar in Afghanistan following an affair with a subordinate, and subsequently retired from the military.

He entered the private sector in 2011 as managing director for Afghanistan with security company GardaWorld. In January 2014 he was arrested in Kabul following licensing issues under Afghanistan's strict regulations for private security contractors, but was released without charges after several weeks. He has since worked as an executive at several Quebec-based companies.

== Early life ==
Daniel Ménard studied military and international studies at the Canadian Forces College while enlisted. He earned his masters in International Management from the University of Quebec.

== Military career ==
Ménard joined the Canadian Army in 1984. He was initially posted to the 3rd Battalion of the Royal 22nd Regiment as a platoon commander. Ménard served in the United Kingdom, Germany, Haiti, and Bosnia. In 2005, as a lieutenant-colonel, he was the commanding officer of a unit stationed at CFB Valcartier in Quebec.

From September 2008 to July 2009, he was a colonel in command of the 5th Canadian Mechanized Brigade Group. He was promoted to brigadier general later that year at the age of 43, making him one of the youngest general officers in the Canadian Armed Forces at the time.

=== Afghanistan ===
Ménard was deployed to Afghanistan in November 2009 as commander of NATO's Joint Task Force Afghanistan and Task Force Kandahar, officially succeeding Brigadier General Jonathan Vance on November 19. He was the sixth Canadian and second French Canadian commander of Task Force Afghanistan since Canadian troops were deployed to Afghanistan in 2006. He was initially in charge of 2800 Canadian soldiers, including units from Princess Patricia's Canadian Light Infantry, as well as 1200 American troops seconded to Canadian command.

By December 3, that had increased to 2000 American troops. At that time, he announced that a unit from the 508th Parachute Infantry Regiment, 82nd Airborne Division of the United States Army would be seconded to Canadian command in Kandahar to assist with stabilizing the city. On December 18, The Montreal Gazette reported that three American units had been seconded to Ménard's command, bringing his brigade to a total of 5,800 troops. On January 29, it was announced that a squadron from the US Army's 71st Cavalry Regiment, 10th Mountain Division, would be joining Ménard's so-called "super brigade".

On March 1, 2010, a car bomb was set off on the Tarnak River Bridge near the city of Kandahar, killing multiple civilians and one American soldier. American war correspondent Michael Yon blamed the Canadian forces for failing to secure the bridge, specifically singling out Ménard for negligence. The Canadian military denied that it had full responsibility for the bridge and described it as being in "a messy gray area that has changed hands a few times".

On March 25, 2010, Ménard accidentally fired his C8 carbine rifle as he was boarding a helicopter at Kandahar Air Field, discharging two bullets into the ground. At the time, he was loading the gun and had neglected to switch on the safety. He reported the incident and ordered an investigation, which confirmed an accidental discharge had occurred, triggering an automatic court-martial. He was found guilty of accidentally discharging his weapon in late May, and was fined $3,500.

=== Affair with subordinate ===
In late May 2010, shortly after his accidental discharge conviction, Ménard was accused of having an inappropriate sexual relationship with a subordinate, Master Corporal Bianka Langlois. The relationship began in Canada in 2008 and continued after they were deployed to Afghanistan, where it was reportedly an open secret among personnel in Kandahar. After Yon blogged about the affair in early 2010, military officials began an internal investigation, as Canadian military regulations forbid sexual relationships during active deployments. Evidence of the affair was discovered in the pair's emails, and they were questioned. Langlois admitted the relationship to investigators, although Ménard pressured her to delete her emails and recant. According to court documents, he "lied twice about the affair when confronted".

Lieutenant General Marc Lessard, commander of Canada's military abroad, stripped Ménard of his command of Task Force Kandahar on May 30. It was the first time since World War II that a Canadian general had been dismissed on the battlefield. Vance resumed command shortly after Ménard's removal.

Ménard was charged on July 12, 2010, with four counts: three from the National Defence Act relating to the inappropriate conduct and obstruction of justice, and one from the Criminal Code of Canada relating to obstruction of justice. Ménard was sent home to Canada and assigned a desk job in Ottawa. He resigned from the military effective December 2010. On July 21, 2011, he pled guilty to two counts relating to inappropriate conduct; the obstruction charges were dropped. He was fined $7,000 and demoted to the rank of colonel, although his resignation rendered the demotion symbolic. The incident resulted in public debate in Canada about the Canadian military's rules about fraternization as well as workplace relationships in general.

== Private sector ==
=== GardaWorld ===
Security company GardaWorld hired Ménard in November 2011 as their managing director for Afghanistan, working out of Afghanistan and Dubai in the United Arab Emirates. Canada's Department of National Defence paid $40,000 for him to relocate from the Montreal area to the United Arab Emirates to take up the job, under a policy which allows retired members with at least 20 years of service to claim the cost of one post-retirement move.

On January 10, 2014, Ménard was arrested in Kabul following a meeting with Afghan officials. He was accused of possessing military equipment – 129 rifles and 148 radios – without a license. Afghan authorities described the charges as "gun smuggling," but GardaWorld described the situation as an administrative issue relating to licensing for the equipment, as Afghanistan strictly regulates the licensing of military equipment to private military contractors. Ménard was kept in a holding facility until he was released without charges on February 19. He departed the country for Dubai shortly after.

=== Subsequent positions ===
After spending nearly 6 years with GardaWorld, Ménard resigned in early 2017 to assume the position of chief operations officer with Quebec-based supply chain, Groupe Robert. Ménard later served as the chief executive officer of Montreal-based security technology company Octasic. As of 2023, Ménard is the chief operating and financial officer at Voti Detection, a Montreal-based company which specializes in 3D X-ray security scanning.

== Personal life ==
Ménard is married with two children. His wife was a major in the Canadian Armed Forces.
