= Silver Cross Mother =

Canadian veterans organization recognition

A Silver Cross Mother (French: Mères décorées de la Croix d’argent) is chosen each year by the Royal Canadian Legion to lay the second wreath during the Remembrance Day ceremony at the National War Memorial in Ottawa on behalf of all mothers who have lost children in the service of their country and after the Governor General of Canada lays the first wreath. The title is named for the Silver Cross, a medal awarded to such mothers by the King or Queen of Canada.

== List ==
Year	Name	Address	In memory of
2026	Virginia Hicks	Frankford, Ontario	daughter, Sapper Mariebeth Short , d. 23 September 2002 at CFB Petawawa
2025	Nancy Payne	Lansdowne, Ontario	son, Cpl. Randy Joseph Payne, d. 22 April 2006 in Afghanistan
2024	Maureen Anderson	Oromocto, New Brunswick	son, Sgt. Ron Anderson, d. 2014 son, Sgt. Ryan Anderson, d. 2017
2023	Gloria Hooper	St. Claude, Manitoba	son, Sapper Christopher Holopina, d. 4 July 1996 in Bosnia
2022	Candy Greff	Lacombe, Alberta	son, Master Cpl. Byron Greff, d. October 2011 in Afghanistan
2021	Josee Simard	Les Méchins, Quebec	daughter, Cpl. Karine Blais, d. 13 April 2009 in Afghanistan
2020	Debbie Sullivan	Summerville, New Brunswick	son, Lt. Chris Saunders, d. 2004 on submarine in Atlantic Ocean
2019	Reine Samson Dawe	South Frontenac, Ontario	son, Capt. Matthew Dawe, d. 4 July 2007, in Afghanistan
2018	Anita Cenerini	Winnipeg, Manitoba	son, Pte. Thomas Welch, d. 8 May 2004, in Petawawa, Ontario
2017	Diana Abel	Brampton, Ontario	son, Cpl. Michael David Abel, d. 3 May 1993, in Somalia
2016	Colleen Fitzpatrick	Prince George, British Columbia	son, Cpl. Darren James Fitzpatrick, d. 20 March 2010, in Afghanistan
2015	Sheila Anderson	Yellowknife, Northwest Territories	son, Cpl. Jordan Anderson, d. 4 July 2007, in Afghanistan
2014	Gisèle Michaud	Edmundston, New Brunswick	son, Master Cpl. Charles-Philippe Michaud, d. 4 July 2009, in Afghanistan
2013	Niki Psiharis	Laval, Québec	son, Sgt. Chris Karigiannis, d. 30 May 2007, in Afghanistan
2012	Roxanne Marie Priede	Grand Forks, British Columbia	son, Master Cpl. Darrell Jason Priede, d. 30 May 2007, in Afghanistan
2011	Patricia (Patty) Braun	Raymore, Saskatchewan	son, Cpl. David Braun, d. 22 Aug. 2006, in Afghanistan
2010	Mabel Girouard	Bathurst, New Brunswick	son, CWO Robert Girouard, d. 27 Nov. 2006, Afghanistan
2009	Della Morley	Winnipeg, Manitoba	son, Cpl. Keith Morley, d. 18 Sep. 06 in Afghanistan
2008	Avril Dianna Stachnik	Waskatenau, Alberta	son, Sgt. Shane Stachnik, d. 3 Sep. 2006, in Afghanistan
2007	Wilhelmina Beerenfenger-Koehler	Embrun, Ontario	son, Cpl. Robbie Beerenfenger, d. 10 Feb. 2003, in Afghanistan
2006	Alice Murphy	Conception Harbour, Newfoundland and Labrador	son, Cpl. Brendan Murphy, d. 27 Jan. 2004, in Afghanistan
2005	Claire Léger	Stittsville, Ontario	son, Sgt. Marc Léger, d. 17 Apr. 2002, in Afghanistan
2004	Agnes Dyer	Montreal, Quebec	son, Cpl. Ainsworth Dyer, d. 17 Apr. 2002, in Afghanistan
2003	Charlotte Lynn Smith	Tatamagouche, Nova Scotia	son, Pte. Nathan Lloyd Smith, d. 17 Apr. 2002, in Afghanistan
2002	Doreen Coolen	Hubbards, Nova Scotia	son, Pte. Richard Anthony Green, d. 17 Apr. 2002, in Afghanistan
2001	Ina Galvin	East Bolton, Quebec	son, Cpl. Daniel Galvin d. 29 Nov. 1993, in Bosnia and Herzegovina
2000	Carol Isfeld	Courtenay, British Columbia	son, Master Cpl. Mark Isfeld d. 21 Jun. 1994, in Croatia
1999	Loyola Helen Park	London, Ontario	son, Cpl. Michael William Simpson d. 9 Aug. 1974, in Syria
1998	Anna Zuk (Prygroski)	Winnipeg, Manitoba	son, Emil Prygroski, d. 1950 from wounds sustained 19 Aug. 1942, in France
1997	Alice Taylor	Ottawa, Ontario	son, Tpr. Richard Taylor, d. 17 Aug. 1944, in France
1996	Margaret Langille	River John, Nova Scotia	son, Pte. Lawrence Alvin Langille, d. 16 Aug. 1944 in France
1995	Elsie Wells	Edmonton, Alberta	son, Pte. Fredrick Orman Wells, d. 8 Mar. 1951, in South Korea
1994	W. Baerr	Yorkton, Saskatchewan	son, Tpr. August Baerr, d. 2 Oct. 1943, in Italy
1993	Isabella Hutchings	St. John's, Newfoundland	son, AB Samuel Grenfell Hutchings, d. 10 Oct. 1945, in the Pacific
1992	Ida Orser	Hartland, New Brunswick	son, Sgt. Ivan Malcolm Orser, d. 28 Feb. 1945, in Germany
1991	Alice Taylor	Ottawa, Ontario	son, Tpr. Richard Taylor, d. 17 Aug. 1944, in France
1990	Elsie Pearce	Trenton, Ontario	son, F/O Stewart William Pearce d. 12 Dec. 1942, over the English Channel son, F/Sgt. Jack Gordon Pearce, d. 27 July 1944, over France
1989	Rachel Morin	Rimouski, Quebec	son, Pte. Camille Joseph Morin, d. 6 Aug. 1952, in South Korea
1988	Hazel Driscoll	Halifax, Nova Scotia	son, AB Kenneth Driscoll, d. 11 Feb. 1941 off Bermuda
1987	Secondina Di Persio	Sydney Mines, Nova Scotia	son, F/Sgt. Querino Di Persio, d. 16 July 1942, in Egypt
1986	Mabel Bateman	Richmond Hill, Ontario	son, Pte. Russell Ernest Bateman, d. 25 July 1944, in France
1985	Rose Bernst	Thunder Bay, Ontario	son, Pte. Clarence Robert Bernst, d. 29 Aug. 29, 1941, in Nova Scotia son, AB Ronald William Bernst, d. 24 Nov. 1944, in Cabot Strait
1984	Olive (Rumball) Hunter	Summerland, British Columbia	son, P/O Harold Marland Rumball, d. 15 Jan. 1945, over Germany
1983	Constance Wylie	Vancouver, British Columbia	son, Pte. Lloyd Wylie, d. 7 Mar. 1951, in South Korea
1982	Janet Fraser	Debert, Nova Scotia	son, F/Sgt. George William Fraser, d. 24 Aug. 1943, over Germany son, Pte. John Robert Fraser, d. 13 Oct. 1944 in the Netherlands
1981	Isabel Harrison	Bury, Quebec	son, L/Cpl. Argyle Clayton Harrison, d. 19 Dec. 1941, in Hong Kong son, Rfn. Edmond Cameron Harrison, d. 9 Sep. 1943 in Hong Kong
1980	Greta Steeves	Elgin, New Brunswick	son, Sgt. John Chesley Steeves, d. 7 July 1941, in the United Kingdom son, L/Cpl. Russell Weldon Steeves, d. 14 Oct. 1945 in New Brunswick
1979	Eliza Beatty	Carlyle, Saskatchewan	son, Pte. Melville Douglas Beatty, d. 19 Aug. 1942, in France son, Pte. Walter Earl Beatty, d. 19 Aug. 1942, in France
1978	Janet Cantley	Montreal, Quebec	son, Sgt. Alexander Crawford Cantley, d. 17 Apr. 1943, in France son, L/Cpl. Charles Robin Cantley, d. 13 Sep. 1944, in France
1977	Mary Boutilier	Niagara Falls, Ontario	son, Pte. Douglas Albert Henry Boutilier, d. 29 Aug. 1944, in France son, Cpl. William Charles Boutilier, d. 10 Sep. 1944, in Belgium
1976	Olive Rae (Jubb)	Victoria, British Columbia	son, P/O Harold Oliver Rae, d. 25 June 1944, in France son, P/O Leslie Elmer Rae, d. 16 Mar. 1945, over Germany
1975	Alta Wilkinson	Ottawa, Ontario	son, Pte. Arthur Campbell Wilkinson, d. 18 July 1944, in France
1974	Annie Margaret Rudd	Stettler, Alberta	son, Sgt. Francis Rudd, d. 9 Oct. 1943, in Germany son, Spr. Thomas William Rudd, d. 19 Sep. 1944, in France
1973	Maragaret Santo	Bender, Saskatchewan	son, W/O Class I Frank Robert Santo, d. 5 May 1943, in the United Kingdom son, P/O John Alexander Santo, d. 1 Aug. 1944, in France
1972	Marie Louise McLeod	Chippewas of Nawash Unceded First Nation, Ontario	son, Pte. Alfred Joseph McLeod, d. 17 Jan. 1944, in Italy son, Tpr. John Joseph McLeod, d. 27 Jul. 1944, in France
1971	Mary Anderson	Selkirk, Manitoba	son, Pte. Vernon Anderson, d. 14 Dec. 1943, in Italy son, Pte. John George Anderson, d. 21 July 1944, in France
1970	Mary Josephine Meech	North Sydney, Nova Scotia	son, F/Sgt. William Ian Meech, d. 13 Apr. 1942, in the United Kingdom son, P/O Lloyd Remington Joseph Meech, d. 19 Feb. 1944, in the North Sea
1969	Wilhemina Gray	Vancouver, British Columbia	son, F/Sgt. John Balfour Gray, d. 27 Feb. 1942, in the United Kingdom son, Lt. Robert Hampton Gray, VC, d. 9 Aug. 1945, in the Pacific
1968	Pearl Rich	Vancouver, British Columbia	son, Private William Rich, d. 2 Nov. 1943, in Italy son, Private George Rich, d. 22 Dec. 1943, in Italy daughter, Wren Mary Rich (Rech), d. 12 Jul. 1944, in Nova Scotia
1967	Elsie Adams	St. Catharines, Ontario	son, Lt. William George Adams, d. 15 Aug. 1944, in France son, Sgt. Allan Frederick Adams, d. 27 Sep. 1944 in Belgium
1966	Mrs. George Stephens	Toronto, Ontario	son, F/Sgt. William Freeborne Colville, d. 6 May 1942, in Newfoundland son, F/O Alexander Colborne Colville, d. 16 Mar. 1944, in the United Kingdom son, F/O John Spencer Colville, 18 Aug. 1944, in France
1965	Nora Wagner	Teeterville, Ontario	son, Pte. Ivan Samuel Wagner, d. 18 July 1944, in France son, Cpl. Harry Everett Wagner, d. 12 Aug. 1944, in France son, Pte. Bruce Howard Wagner, d. 31 Jan. 1945, in France
1964	Bernadette Rivait	Windsor, Ontario	son, Pte. Leon Maxime Rivait, d. 19 Aug. 1942, in France son, Pte. Alphonse Cecil Rivait, d. 19 Aug. 1942, in France son, Pte. Lawrence Rivait, d. 23 Nov. 1944, in the Netherlands
1963	Mary E. Stodgell	Norwood, Manitoba	son, Pte. Stanley Fredrick Stodgell, d. 19 Dec. 1941, in Hong Kong son, Pte. Garnett James Stodgell, d. 20 Mar. 1943, in Hong Kong son, Cpl. Cyril Angus Stodgell, d. 11 Sep. 1944, in Belgium
1962	Vitaline Lanteigne	Caraquet, New Brunswick	son, Pte. Jean Baptiste Lanteigne, d. 12 June 1944, in France son, Pte. Philippe Joseph Lanteigne, d. 14 Aug. 1944, in France son, L/Cpl. Arthur Lanteigne, d. 15 Sep. 1944, in Italy
1961	Sylvia Kimmel	Mission, British Columbia	son, Rfn. Gordon Leroy Kimmel, d. 8 June 1944, in France son, Cpl. Richard Kenneth Kimmel, d. 18 Jun 1944, in France son, Cpl. Clifford Howard Kimmel, d. 5 Dec. 1944, in Italy
1960	Julienne Cantin	McCreary, Manitoba	son, Pte. Wilfred Cantin, d. 4 Nov. 1940, in Ontario son, F/O Clement Francis Cantin, d. 9 Oct. 1942, in Egypt son, F/O Maurice Raoul Cantin, d. 26 Nov. 1943, over Germany
1959	Dagnie Asta Anderson	Craigmyle, Alberta	son, F/Sgt. James Sangster Anderson, d. 17 Oct. 1942, in the United Kingdom son, F/O William Boyd Anderson, d. 20 Jan. 1943, in the Bay of Biscay son, F/Sgt. Lloyd George Anderson, d. 31 Mar. 1944, over Germany
1958	Helen Forestell	Coniston, Ontario	son, W/O Class II Daniel Arthur Forestell, d. 5 Apr. 1943, in the English Channel son, W/O Class II Thomas Bernard Forestell, d. 20 Mar. 1944, in Ontario son, F/O Robert Samuel Forestell, d. 8 Aug. 1944, in the Bay of Biscay
1957	Zylpha MacFarlane	Truro, Nova Scotia	husband, Pte. John Henry Griffiths, d. 9 Apr. 1917, in France son, F/Sgt. David William MacFarlane, d. 26 May 1943, over Germany son, Sgt. Robert James Griffiths, d. 8 July 1944 in France
1956	Gertrude Edna Reynolds	Chatham, Ontario	son, F/O Hugh Gordon Reynolds, d. 16 Jan. 1943, in the United Kingdom son, W/O Class II Arthur Mac Reynolds, d. 31 Jan. 1943, in Malta son, P/O Douglas Glen Reynolds, d. 15 Apr. 1944 in Nova Scotia
1955	Regina Leboldus	Vibank, Saskatchewan	son, F/O Peter John Leboldus, d. 13 Feb. 1943, in France son, F/Sgt. John Anthony Leboldus, d. 24 Nov. 1943, in Italy son, Sgt. Martin Benedict Leboldus, d. 20 Feb. 1944, over Europe
1954	Margaret Heeney	Ottawa, Ontario	son, Cpl. Cecil George Heeney, d. 29 Dec. 1941, in Ontario son, F/O Robert Tilton Heeney, d. 9 Aug. 1943, in France
1953	Mary Casey	Ottawa, Ontario	son, W/O Class II Raymond Francis Casey, d. 14 July 1942, in the United Kingdom son, F/O John Joseph Casey, d. 31 Mar. 1945, over Germany
1952	Hannah McCann	Ottawa, Ontario	son, P/O Leonard Myles McCann, d. 24 Mar. 1944, over Germany
1951	Alice Rochon	Ottawa, Ontario	son, Maj. Robert Lionel Rochon, d. 25 Apr. 1945, in the Netherlands
1950	Susan Beasley	Ottawa, Ontario	son, AC 1st Class William Harold Beasley, d. 12 June 1944, in Ontario son, F/O Joseph Ronald Beasley, d. 24 Dec. 1944, in Belgium
1949	Marie Aline D’Aoust	Ottawa, Ontario	son, Lt. Gerard Raoul D’Aoust, d. 14 Aug. 1944, in France
1948	Catherine Helen MacDonald	Ottawa, Ontario	son, Sgt. Neil Richardson MacDonald, d. 30 Apr. 1941, off the coast of Ireland son, Sgt. Ian Alistair MacDonald, d. 20 Oct. 1941, in England
1947	Martha Labarge	Ottawa, Ontario	son, F/Sgt. Leo John Labarge, d. 30 Sep. 1942, in Libya son, P/O Bernard Henry Labarge, d. 12 Mar., 1943, over Germany
1944 - 1946	Jessie Isobel Olga McCleery	Ottawa, Ontario	son, F/O Raymond Norman McCleery, d. 17 Dec. 1942, in the Netherlands
1943	Edith Louisa Coldrey	Ottawa, Ontario	son, Spr. Kendall Augustus Coldrey, d. 3 May 1917, in France
1942	Sarah Wilkins Lamplough	Ottawa, Ontario	son, Cpl. Leonard Alderson Lamplough, d. 9 May 1915, in Belgium son, Gnr. Frank Wilkins Lamplough, d. 10 July 1918, in France
1939 - 1941	Catherine Lewis	Ottawa, Ontario	son, Pte. Henry Bartle Lewis, d. 27 Nov. 1915, in Belgium son, Pte. Charles Walter Lewis, d. 18 Nov. 1916, in France
1936	Charlotte Susan Wood	Winnipeg, Manitoba	son, Pte. Frederick Francis Wood, d. 24 Aug. 1914, in Belgium son, Pte. Peter Percy Wood, d. 5 May 1917, in France
