= Canada–United Arab Emirates relations =

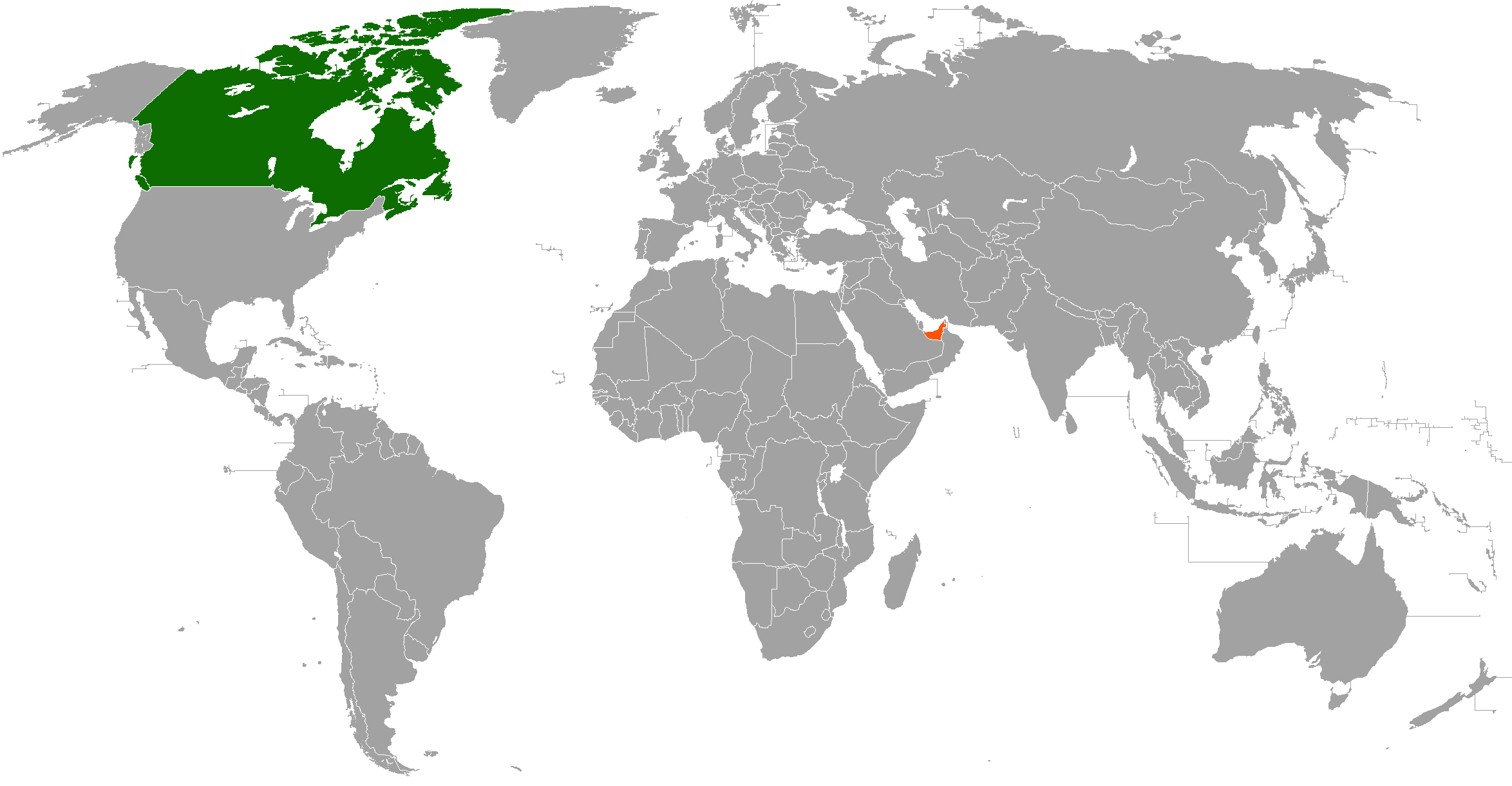

- Canada: United Arab Emirates

Canada and the United Arab Emirates established diplomatic relations in 1974. Each maintains an embassy in the other's capital.

== History ==
Formal relations between the two countries were established in 1974, 3 years after the independence of the United Arab Emirates.

In November 2025, Canadian Prime Minister Mark Carney faced criticism during a high-profile trade mission to the United Arab Emirates following investigations that linked Canadian-made weapons to atrocities in Sudan. While the mission aimed to secure a $70 billion (CAD) investment deal and to establish a Comprehensive Economic Partnership Agreement (CEPA) with the UAE, critics argued that economic interests were prioritized over human rights concerns. The deal was further scrutinized by human rights advocates due to allegations that the UAE was involved in arming the Rapid Support Forces (RSF) militia during the Sudanese civil war. Activists and human rights organizations accused the UAE of serving as a key intermediary in facilitating these weapons, thereby bypassing international arms embargoes.

== Diplomatic relationship ==
Canada's ambassador to the United Arab Emirates, Masud Husain, appointed 23 October 2016, completed his term in July 2019. As of September 2019, the current Canadian Ambassador to the UAE is Marcy Grossman. The current Emirati ambassador to Canada is Fahad Al Raqbani, appointed 1 January 2018.

=== Visa requirement ===
Due to the cordial relationship between the two governments, a free visa on arrival for Canadian citizens traveling to UAE and with UAE meeting the requirements for visa free entry to Canada, Canadian and Emirati citizens do not require a visa and enjoy a visa free travel between the two countries.

== Aviation ==
Travel between Canada and United Arab Emirates is operated by Emirates, Etihad, and Air Canada all operating daily flights. Emirates operates daily between Toronto and Dubai on Airbus A380 aircraft, Air Canada operates daily between Toronto and Dubai on Boeing 787 Dreamliner aircraft and Etihad operates daily between Toronto and Abu Dhabi on a Boeing 777-300ER aircraft. As of July 2023, Emirates also operates daily between Montreal and Dubai on Boeing 777-300ER aircraft while Air Canada will operate 5 flights a week between Vancouver and Dubai on Boeing 787 Dreamliner aircraft as of October 2023.

=== Aviation dispute ===
The Canada–United Arab Emirates aviation dispute was a dispute between Canada and the United Arab Emirates over aviation rights. The dispute revolved around Canada's refusal to allow extra landing rights to Emirati air carriers: Emirates and Etihad Airways. The dispute has resolved in July 2018 after Canada opened its airspace to 5 flights a week between Toronto and Dubai and Toronto and Abu Dhabi.

==== Background ====
In 1999 Canada and the United Arab Emirates signed their first air agreement, under which Emirati airliners would be allowed to fly into Canada six times a week. In October 2007 Emirates began offering three flights a week between Toronto and Dubai; soon after this it began requesting that Canada allow increased flights to the country as part of an expansion plan to service increased demand between Canada and the UAE, citing the 27,000 Canadians residing in the UAE and important trade relationships between the two countries, Canada's largest trade partner in the Middle East.

Negotiations between the two countries occurred for several years, but resulted in little to no progress. In June 2010, an agreement for the Canadian military to use a UAE military base to service its operations in Afghanistan expired. The UAE granted a three-month extension of the military base lease, but further talks stalled and the agreement was not renewed after again expiring in October.

In November 2010 it was reported that although Air Canada objected to any increased service to Canadian destinations, Canada was prepared to offer more landing slots at Calgary and Vancouver. The UAE wasn't satisfied with anything less than more flights to Toronto, however. It was also reported that Canada's offers included a capacity cut instead of a capacity increase, meaning that the offers were of little value to the UAE and UAE negotiators were accordingly offended.

==== Closure of airspace to Canadian ministers' plane ====
On 11 October 2010, Canada's Minister of National Defence, Peter MacKay, spoke at a news conference in Kandahar, Afghanistan, while visiting Canadian troops stating that negotiations with the UAE to extend the lease of the Canadian base had failed and that the Canadian Forces would vacate Camp Mirage in compliance with the UAE's wishes. This posed a potential problem for transportation to and from Afghanistan.

Hours later MacKay, Chief of the Defence Staff General Walter Natynczyk and Veterans Affairs Minister Jean-Pierre Blackburn were on a plane back to Canada which was scheduled to land at Camp Mirage when it was denied landing rights and forced to reroute to Europe. The UAE responded to the incident saying that the Canadian government of Prime Minister Stephen Harper (Conservative Party) was distorting information about the incident; that the plane had been notified ahead of time that landing rights had been suspended, and that the Harper government was resorting to "fear tactics" to spin a negative light on the UAE in the Canadian media. The Harper government in turn said that it would not be "blackmailed" by the UAE using its military base as a bargaining chip.

==== Possible effect on Canada's United Nations Security Council bid ====
According to Canadian Broadcasting Corporation, an unnamed UAE official stated that the UAE lobbied against Canada's bid in the 2010 United Nations Security Council election, which Canada failed to acquire a seat in, due to the airline dispute. No official connection or response was made by Canada or UAE regarding the news source.

==== Visa requirements imposed on Canadians ====
In November 2010 the UAE announced that Canadians would require visas to enter the UAE beginning 2 January 2011. Visa requirements for UAE citizens to enter Canada were already present. After a nuclear deal was signed between Canada and UAE in September 2012, the visa fees ($1,000 for a six-month, multiple-entry visa, and $250 for a 30-day visa) has been reduced by a third.

Canada and the United Arab Emirates agreed to end the visa requirements for Canadians traveling to UAE when Canadian Foreign Affairs Minister John Baird and his UAE counterpart Sheikh Abdullah bin Zayed Al Nahyan met on 2 April 2013, during Baird's visit to the UAE. They announced that they have agreed to restore the visa regime that existed prior to the dispute. They said the two countries are also ready to sign a nuclear co-operation deal. Details on the two agreements formalized in the next month.

==== 2011 Canadian federal election ====
On 2 May 2011, Canadians went to the polls in the 41st federal election and once again the Conservative Party of Stephen Harper emerged as the party with most elected representatives, this time with a majority of seats in Parliament. This was much to the dismay of the UAE, which considered Harper largely responsible for the souring of their bilateral relationship. The Emirati airlines have since announced that they will take some time before re-approaching the deal with Canadian authorities.

==== Resolution ====
In June 2018, Sultan Al Mansouri, the UAE's Minister of Economy, met with Marc Garneau, the Canadian Minister of Transport, in Ottawa to discuss cooperation in the air transport field. The meeting came during the same time where Canadian-Emirati relations seem to have improved drastically, with Canada declaring that UAE has met the status quo for visa free travel and removed its visa requirements for Emirati citizens. In July 2018, the years-long dispute has been resolved as Emirates and Etihad Airlines announced that they will increase their flights to Toronto 5 times a week after signing an agreement with Canadian authorities.

In April 2023, Canada and the UAE signed another bilateral agreement that allows up to 21 more weekly flights between the two countries; both Emirates and Etihad Airlines announced that they will further increase their flights to 7 times a week (daily) to Toronto, and as of July 2026 both airlines fly Airbus A380s on their Toronto flights.

== Resident diplomatic missions ==
- Canada has an embassy in Abu Dhabi and a consulate-general in Dubai.
- United Arab Emirates has an embassy in Ottawa and a consulate-general in Toronto.

Embassy of Canada in Abu Dhabi
- Location: Abu Dhabi
- Address: Abu Dhabi Trade Towers, Abu Dhabi Mall, West Tower, 9th & 10th Floors
- Ambassador: Radha Krishna Panday

Embassy of United Arab Emirates in Ottawa
- Location: Ottawa
- Address: 125 Boteler St, ON K1N 0A4
- Ambassador: Fahad Saeed Mohamed Abdulla AL Raqbani

== See also ==
- Embassy of Canada, Abu Dhabi
- List of ambassadors of Canada to the United Arab Emirates
- Foreign relations of Canada
- Foreign relations of the United Arab Emirates
