= List of ambassadors of Canada to the United Arab Emirates =

The Canadian ambassador to the United Arab Emirates is an official diplomatic post held by a senior Canadian civil servant.

== List of Canadian ambassadors to the United Arab Emirates ==
| Ambassador | Start of term | End of term |
|---|---|---|
| James George | February 26, 1974 | September 17, 1977 |
| Kenneth Douglas Taylor | July 28, 1977 | October 19, 1978 |
| Harry Stewart Hay | October 19, 1978 | July 15, 1981 |
| Francis Ian Wood | September 3, 1981 | September, 1984 |
| Henry W. Guy^{*} | September, 1984 | September, 1984 |
| David Stewart McCracken | November 21, 1985 | August, 1986 |
| George James Shannon^{*} | August, 1986 | April, 1987 |
| Lawrence T. Dickenson | September 22, 1988 | September 24, 1992 |
| J. Christopher Poole | August 27, 1992 | May 23, 1996 |
| Stuart B. McDowall | July 12, 1996 | August 11, 1999 |
| Christopher Thomson | August 11, 1999 | July 2, 2002 |
| David Hutton | July 2, 2002 | June 14, 2006 |
| Sara Hradecky | June 14, 2006 | 2009 |
| Ken W. Lewis | September 30, 2009 | 2012 |
| Arif Z. Lalani | 2 April 2013 | 2016 |
| Husain Masud | July 18, 2016 | |
| Marcy Grossman | October 2019 | |
| Radha Krishna Panday | | |

== See also ==
- Canada–United Arab Emirates relations
- Embassy of Canada, Abu Dhabi
