= Embassy of Canada, Abu Dhabi =

Diplomatic mission of Canada in the United Arab Emirates

Coordinates: 24.4964°N 54.3828°E

The Embassy of Canada to the United Arab Emirates (French: Ambassade du Canada aux Émirats arabes unis) is Canada's diplomatic mission to the United Arab Emirates. The embassy is located on the 9th and 10th floors of the West Tower of the Abu Dhabi Trade Center, next to Abu Dhabi Mall.

== History ==
Diplomatic relations between Canada and the United Arab Emirates were established in 1974. As Canadian presence in the United Arab Emirates increased, a Trade Office was opened in Dubai in 1991 in cooperation with the private-sector Canada Arab Business Council. Two years later, in 1993, the Trade Office was upgraded to a consulate, with Robert Farrell becoming the first consul-general and senior trade commissioner. The embassy was officially opened in 1996, with Stuart McDowall becoming the first resident ambassador. In 1999, the United Arab Emirates opened its embassy in Ottawa.

The embassy was originally located on the Corniche by the Hilton hotel and then in 1998 moved to a Villa in Al Manasir area. In 2006, having outgrown the villa, the embassy moved to its present location in Abu Dhabi Mall, West Tower 9th & 10th floors.

There are 40,000 Canadian citizens currently living in the United Arab Emirates, with a large number of them involved in the health and education sectors. 15,000 reside in the emirate of Abu Dhabi and the remaining 25,000 in Dubai and the northern emirates. The United Arab Emirates is the only Persian Gulf country to host two Canadian diplomatic missions (one in Abu Dhabi and one in Dubai).

The United Arab Emirates is also Canada's largest export market in the Middle East and North Africa region. A bilateral agreement to further enhance economic cooperation, trade and investment was signed in 2009 by Canada's Minister of International Trade, Stockwell Day, and the United Arab Emirates' Minister of Economy, Sultan bin Saeed Al Mansoori.

== Embassy sections ==
The Visa Section processes applications for temporary resident and permanent resident visas from citizens and residents of the United Arab Emirates, Bahrain, Kuwait, Oman, Qatar, Saudi Arabia and Yemen.

The Trade Section promotes Canada's trade and economic interests in the emirate of Abu Dhabi, and supports Canadian companies and their products, services or technologies in the Emirati and regional market. This section also offers UAE clients assistance regarding investment and trade opportunities in Canada.

The Consular Section provides assistance to Canadians travelling, studying or residing in the emirate of Abu Dhabi.

The Political, Economic and Public Affairs Section has a broad scope of responsibilities including promoting bilateral political relations and managing public affairs.

The Department of National Defence has also a Canadian Defence Attaché Office.

== List of ambassadors ==
- 1996-1999: Stuart McDowall
- 1999-2002: Christopher Thomson
- 2002-2006: David Hutton
- 2006-2009: Sara S. Hradecky
- 2009-2012: Ken W. Lewis
- 2012-2016: Arif Lalani
- 2016-2019: Masud Husain
- 2019-2022: Marcy Grossman
- 2022-Present: Radha Krishna Panday

== See also ==
- Canada–United Arab Emirates relations
- List of ambassadors of Canada to the United Arab Emirates
