= Planned Tarnak Farm raid =

1998 CIA plan to capture Osama bin Laden

Tarnak Farm, the site of the planned raid, photographed in 2001

In 1998, the Central Intelligence Agency (CIA) of the United States planned to capture Osama bin Laden from Tarnak Farm, a compound in Afghanistan. At the time, bin Laden was a notorious financier of terrorism and a major target for American officials. The plan for the raid was first drafted in the fall of 1997. Throughout the spring of 1998, various CIA and National Security Council officials discussed the plan. While some CIA officials were hopeful, the operation was called off about a month away from being executed. Officials were concerned about the risk of civilian casualties and the possibility of bin Laden being killed or him escaping. The lead CIA officer in Afghanistan described the odds of bin Laden being captured or killed as roughly 40%.

== Background ==
In 1993, the CIA became aware that bin Laden paid for the training of Egyptian terrorists in Sudan and supported Yemeni terrorists who tried to kill American troops in Aden in 1992. Sources in the US State Department described bin Laden as financing jihads against "anti-Islamic regimes worldwide." He was placed on the TIPOFF anti-terrorism watchlist after Sudan was designated a state-sponsor of terrorism. In 1996, the CIA established the Bin Laden Issue Station (Alec Station) as a group directly focused on bin Laden's activities.

Bin Laden left Sudan for Afghanistan in May 1996. By 1997, officers in the Bin Laden Issue Station realized that al-Qaeda was a military committee actively plotting against the United States. Station analysts found links that connected al-Qaeda to attacks on American troops in Aden in 1992 and in Somalia in 1993, and to the Bojinka plot—a foiled terrorist plan to blow up 11 airliners flying from Asia to the United States. The chief of the Alec Station, Michael Scheuer, viewed bin Laden's move to Afghanistan "as a stroke of luck." The CIA established old Soviet-era contacts in the country as they tracked down Mir Amal Kansi, a Pakistani national who killed two CIA employees in January 1993. These contacts were able to provide information on bin Laden's movements, activities, and living arrangements. They also provided evidence that he was spending large amounts of money to help the Taliban.

=== Tarnak Farm ===
Tarnak Farm was a compound just outside Kandahar Airport in Afghanistan. It consisted of roughly 80 concrete or mud-brick buildings that were surrounded by a wall that was 10 feet (3.0 m) high. It had been constructed as an agricultural cooperative by the Soviet-backed Democratic Republic of Afghanistan. It contained dormitory-style houses, storage facilities, a mosque, and a building that had been converted into a medical clinic. A six-story office building sat on the edge of the compound. Outside Tarnak Farm were a series of plots, irrigation canals, and drainage ditches. The site was roughly half an hour's drive away from the city of Khandahar, and the nearest buildings were over 1 mile (1.6 km) away. Alongside Taliban fighters, there were dozens of women and children living at the site.

== Plan ==
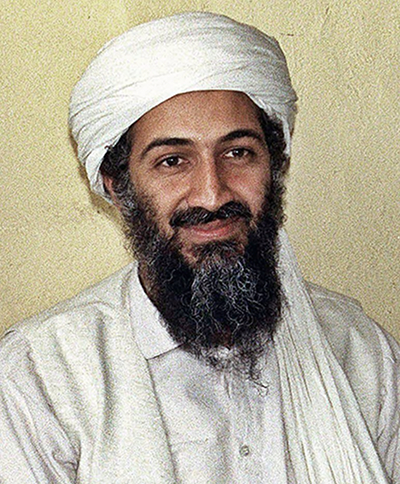
Osama bin Laden, the target of the raid, in 1997 or 1998

The operation would take place late at night on June 23. A group of tribal Afghans, about thirty in total, would drive from a CIA staging point to a site a few miles away from Tarnak Farm. There, the main raiding party would walk to the compound. Their path would allow them to avoid minefields and use natural gullies to keep them hidden. They would enter by climbing through a drainage ditch on the north side of the compound.

The second group would take their vehicles to the front gates of the compound. They would kill the two guards using silenced pistols. The main group would break into the buildings where bin Laden and his wives slept. Once they located him, he would be cuffed, taken to the gates, and loaded into a Toyota Land Cruiser. They would then return to the rally point to offload bin Laden to a second group. The second group would hold him for an unknown amount of time in a cave complex roughly 30 miles (48 km) away. He would be held for about a month. By July 23, he would be taken to a desert landing zone near the Afghan-Pakistani border that had been tested in the 1997 capture of Kansi. A CIA plane would then take him to wherever he was to be arraigned.

== Development and preparation ==
From a combination of satellite photos and on-the-ground intelligence by the Afghans, the CIA mapped the site. They were able to identify the houses that belonged to bin Laden's wives and where he was most likely to sleep. The plan was developed over the course of several meetings between case officers in Islamabad and the leaders of the tribal team. In the fall of 1997, a rough draft of the plan was made. That fall, they also ran two complete rehearsals of the plan. CIA officers debated amongst themselves about their legal authority to conduct such an operation and the potential for civilian casualties. CIA headquarters asked tribal agents for detailed explanations on how they planned to minimize harm to the compound's women and children. This back-and-forth was described as a "frustrating discussion on both sides" by Steve Coll, an American journalist and historian, in his 2004 book Ghost Wars.

Planners at the CIA's Counterterrorist Center (CTC) returned to the White House in early 1998 to seek formal approval of the plan. CIA Director George Tenet, walked the National Security Advisor, Sandy Berger, through the plan on February 13. CTC briefing papers acknowledged that the plan was full of hitches: people might be killed and bin Laden's supporters might retaliate. However, the papers said, there was also a risk in inaction. They said that bin Laden would attack American interests, possibly using weapons of mass destruction.

Following this meeting, Richard Clarke's Counterterrorism Security Group (CSG) reviewed the plan. The National Security Council told CIA planners to begin drafting legal documents that could authorize the operation. The CSG stressed the fact that the raid should only target bin Laden and not the entire Tarnak Farm complex. Following a third rehearsal in March, CIA planners briefed the CSG again. Clarke wrote to Berger and described the plan as "somewhat embryonic", saying that the CIA was several months away from doing anything.

Scheuer described the plan as being perfect as it required minimum infastructure. He modified the plan so the tribals would keep bin Laden in hiding for about a month before turning him over to the United States. The lead CIA officer in Afghanistan, Gary Schroen, also had confidence in the tribal forces. He estimated the odds of capturing or killing bin Laden at 40% and said the odds were "about as good as it can be." White House officials reacted with skepticism, describing the tribals as "old anti-Soviet mujahideeen" who were likely milking the CIA for money while minimizing their danger. Some felt they were unlikely to attempt a serious raid on Tarnak Farm. If they did, women and children could die and bin Laden would likely escape. The White House's support was necessary as they would have to approve a formal budget for the operation. CIA headquarters and policymakers would also have to approve the operation.

On May 18, CIA officials reviewed a draft of a legal document that would authorize the capture operation. Discussion revealed that some CIA senior managers were uneasy about the plan. James Pavitt, the assistant head of the Directorate of Operations, was worried about casualties and said the plan had the "slight flavor" of an assassination. He also calculated that it would cost several million US dollars. Despite his concerns, CIA leadership approved the draft and sent it to the NSC. From May 20–24, the CIA ran a final rehearsal of the operation. It spread over three timezones and brought in personnel from the region as well as the FBI.

== Scrapping ==
A meeting of the NSC Principals Committee was scheduled on May 29, but it was cancelled the same day. Scheuer, Tenet, Pavitt, and the chief of the Directorate of Operations' Near Eastern Division met and decided not to go ahead with the operation. Cabinet-level officials were concerned about the risk of civilian casualties, the safety of the tribal operatives, and the possibility of killing bin Laden. The plan was never formally presented to the White House, which itself had no enthusiasm. Some lower-level CIA officers reacted poorly to the decision as they were confident the raid could succeed.
