= Tarnak Farms =

Former Afghan training camp

Coordinates: 31°27′18″N 65°49′26″E

- Interactive map of Tarnak Farms

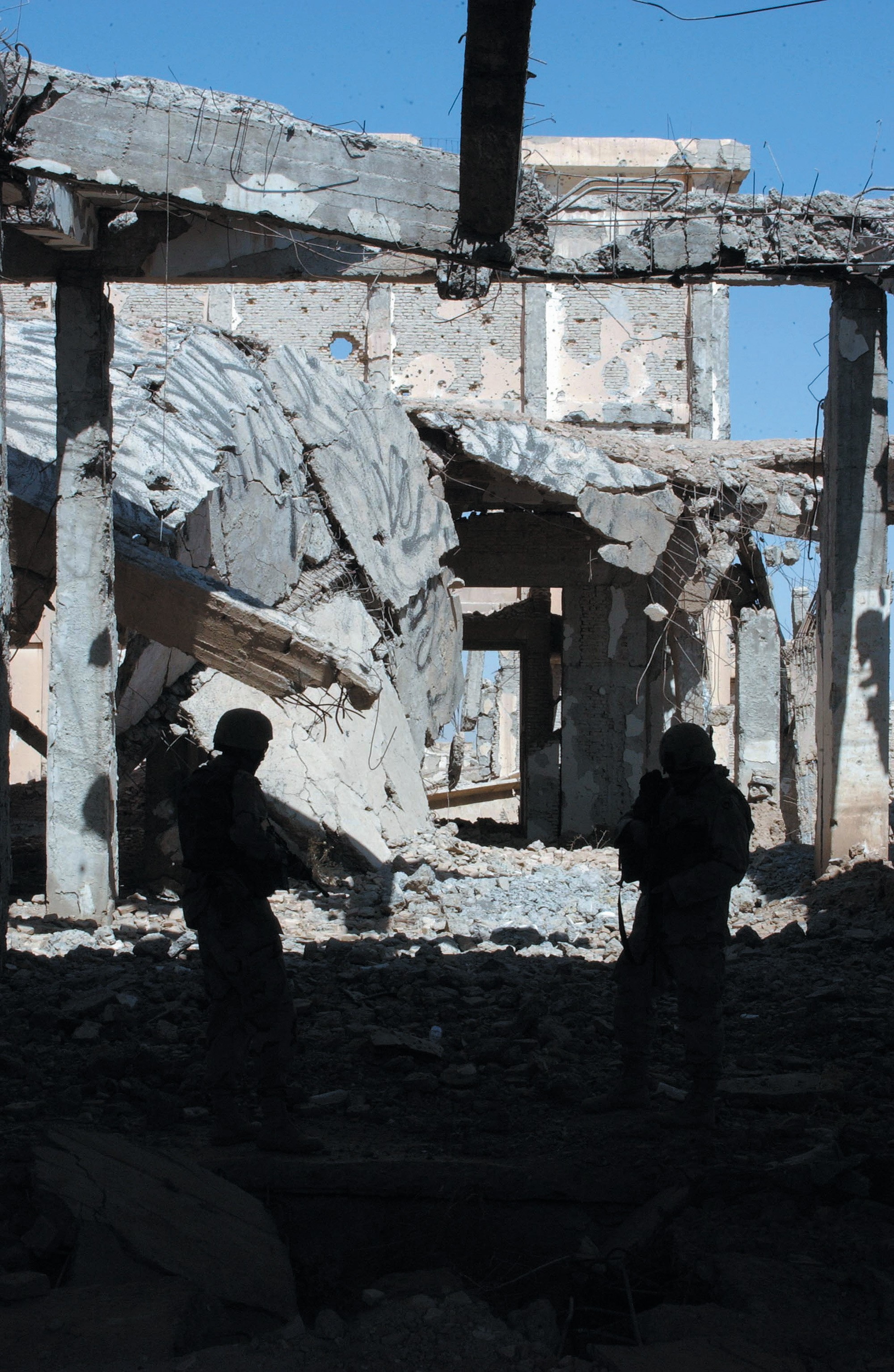
Tarnak Farms still in ruins in 2005.

Tarnak Farm was an Afghan training camp near Kandahar, which served as a base to al-Qaeda emir Osama bin Laden and his followers from 1998 to 2001. It was also the site of the Tarnak Farm incident.

== Description ==
Tarnak Farms was a compound just outside Khandahar Airport in Afghanistan. It consisted of roughly 80 concrete or mud-brick buildings that were surrounded by a wall that was 10 feet (3.0 m) high. It had been constructed as an agricultural cooperative by the Soviet-backed Democratic Republic of Afghanistan. It contained dormitory-style houses, storage facilities, a mosque, and a building that had been converted into a medical clinic. A six-story office building sat on the edge of the compound. Outside Tarnak Farms were a series of plots, irrigation canals, and drainage ditches. The site was roughly half an hour's drive away from the city of Khandahar, and the nearest buildings were over 1 mile (1.6 km) away.

== History ==
In 1998, Osama bin Laden moved his followers from Nazim Jihad to Tarnak Farms following Northern Alliance threats to attack Jalalabad. Video of Tarnak Farms in 2000 made by the Central Intelligence Agency appeared to show bin Laden at the location. The administration of U.S. President Bill Clinton considered seizing bin Laden at Tarnak Farm, but the mission was never carried out due to concerns about killing innocent women and children, as well as legal disagreements within the administration.

The Tarnak Farms facility housed an al-Qaeda poison and explosive training laboratory and an advanced operational training camp. Operatives of al-Qaeda received advanced operational training at the facility, including urban assault. The September 11 hijackers Mohamed Atta and Ziad Jarrah recorded their wills at Tarnak Farms.

On April 17, 2002, a friendly fire incident occurred when four Canadian soldiers of the Princess Patricia's Canadian Light Infantry were killed at Tarnak Farms while conducting a live-fire training exercise. While flying an F-16, American pilot Harry Schmidt dropped a 227-kilogram laser-guided bomb on the Canadian position. The bomb killed Canadian Forces Sgt Marc Leger, Cpl Ainsworth Dyer, Pte Richard Green and Pte Nathan Lloyd Smith and wounded eight CF soldiers.

== See also ==
- Al-Damazin Farms
