= Tarnak Farm incident =

Friendly-fire airstrike in Afghanistan

- Part of the War in Afghanistan
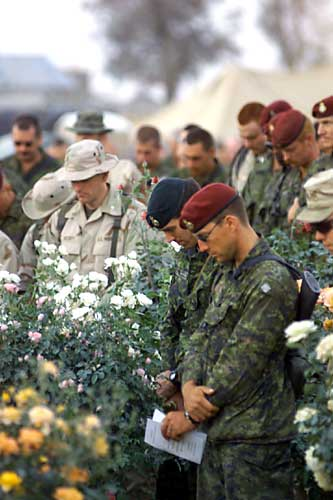
- Memorial service for the dead Canadian soldiers held shortly after the incident.
Date	April 17, 2002
Location	Kandahar province, Afghanistan
Result	4 Canadian soldiers killed

Belligerents
Canada	United States

Units involved
Princess Patricia's Canadian Light Infantry	332d Aerospace Expeditionary Group

Strength
Unknown number of troops	1 F-16

Casualties and losses
4 killed 8 injured 1 anti-tank weapon 1 artillery piece	None

On the night of April 17, 2002, a United States F-16 fighter jet piloted by Air National Guard Major William Umbach and Major Harry Schmidt dropped a laser-guided 500-pound (230 kg) bomb on a Canadian training camp in Tarnak Farms, Afghanistan, killing four Canadian soldiers and injuring eight members of the 3rd Battalion Princess Patricia's Canadian Light Infantry Battle Group (3PPCLIBG) in what is known as the Tarnak Farm incident.

The Canadian soldiers were conducting a firing exercise at Tarnak Farms. The Air National Guards, thinking that the shots were aimed at them, dropped a bomb in "self-defence", an act that would lead to both Umbach and Schmidt being tried on counts of negligent manslaughter, aggravated assault, and dereliction of duty.

The deaths were the first of Canada's war in Afghanistan, and the first Canadian deaths in a combat zone since the Korean War.

== Incident ==
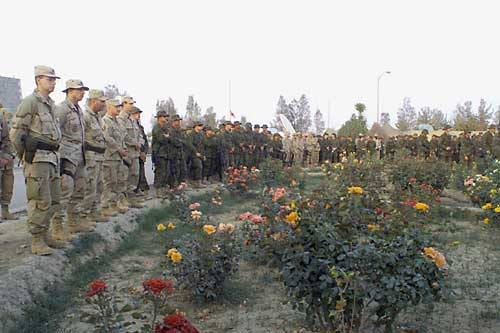
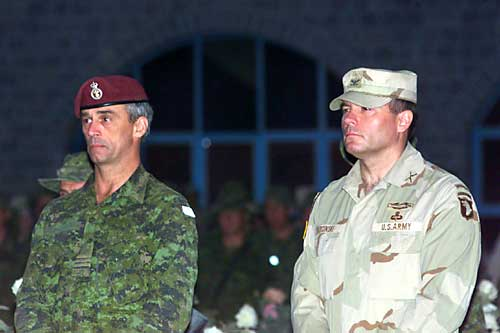
Memorial service for the dead Canadian soldiers held shortly after the incident.

USAF F-16 pilots Major William Umbach and his wingman Major Harry Schmidt were returning to their base after a 10-hour night patrol. While flying at 23,000 feet (7,000 m), they reported surface-to-air fire. The fire was actually from a Canadian Forces anti-tank and machine-gun exercise, which was taking place on a former Taliban firing range.

Schmidt descended a few thousand feet to take a closer look, and asked for permission to "lay down some 20 mike-mike", or spray the area with 20-millimeter cannon fire, but was told to stand by. Umbach cautioned his wing man to wait, as well. "Let's just make sure that it's, that it's not friendlies, is all", he said.

At 9:25, the pilots' AWACS controller ordered them to "hold fire" and asked Schmidt for more information on the surface-to-air fire. A minute later, after seeing another firing plume from an anti-tank weapon, Schmidt reported seeing "some men on a road, and it looks like a piece of artillery firing at us."

"I am rolling in in self-defense", he said.

After Umbach reminded him to unlock his weapons, Schmidt called "bombs away". Twenty-two seconds later, he reported a direct hit. Ten seconds later, the controller ordered the pilots to disengage, saying the forces on the ground were "friendlies Kandahar".

Schmidt's testimony at his Article 32 hearing was that he believed his flight leader, Umbach, was under attack. The radio logs show that Schmidt requested permission from flight control to fire his 20 mm cannons at what he alleged was an anti-aircraft or Multiple Launch Rocket System below.

== Casualties ==
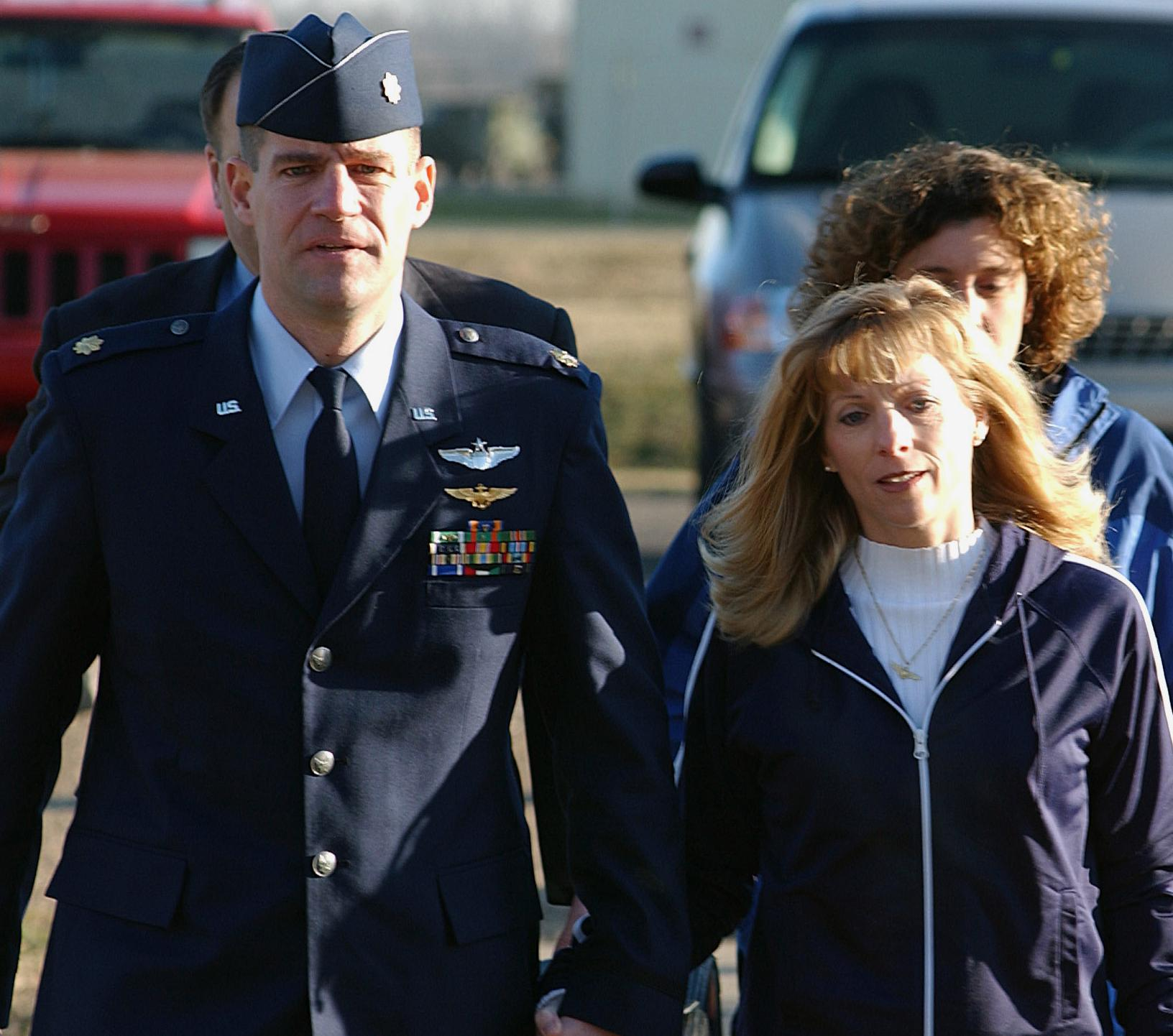
Major Harry Schmidt and wife Lisa enter the Tarnak Farms Article 32 hearing room.

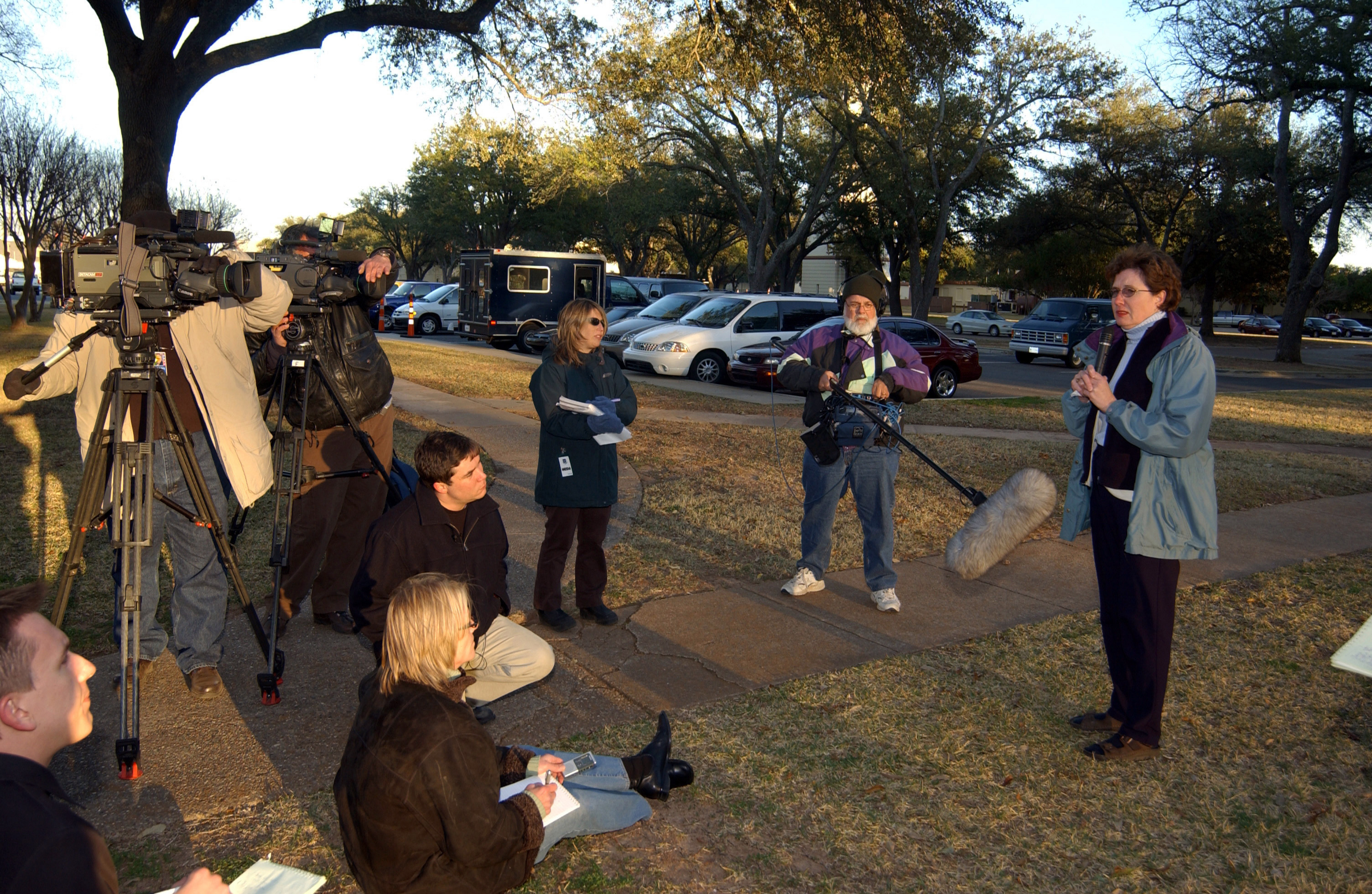
Claire Léger, mother of Canadian Sergeant Marc Léger, speaks to media about the Tarnak Farms incident.

The soldiers who were killed were:

- Sergeant Marc Daniel Léger, Age: 29, from Lancaster, Ontario.
- Corporal Ainsworth Dyer, Age: 24, Montreal, Quebec.
- Private Richard Green, Age: 21, Mill Cove, Nova Scotia.
- Private Nathan Lloyd Smith, Age: 27, Porters Lake, Nova Scotia.

The eight wounded men include:

- Sergeant Lorne Ford, Age: 33, Brampton, Ontario
- Corporal René Paquette, Age: 33, Winnipeg, Manitoba
- Corporal Brett Perry, Age: 26, Winnipeg, Manitoba
- Private Norman Link, Age: 24, Grande Prairie, Alberta
- Corporal Brian Decaire, Age: 25, Winnipeg, Manitoba
- Master Corporal Curtis Hollister, Age: 29, Cupar, Saskatchewan
- Master Corporal Stan Clark, Age: 35, Vancouver, British Columbia
- Corporal Shane Brennan, Age: 28, Collingwood, Ontario

== Findings of Board of Inquiry ==
Two Boards of Inquiry, one Canadian and one American, were held simultaneously. The two boards shared personnel information. Canadian Brigadier-General M.J. Dumais was specialist advisor to the Canadian board and co-chair of the American board. The findings of the four-member Canadian Tarnak Farm Board of Inquiry, chaired by General Maurice Baril, were released on June 28, 2002. The Board found that the Canadian troops engaged in the night live-fire exercise had conducted their operations as authorized and in accordance with the established range procedures for the types of weapons fire. The Board concluded that the American F-16 pilots contravened established procedures and were the cause of the incident. The Board further concluded that correcting deficiencies in air coordination and control and tactical planning might have prevented the accident:

"... as much as the F-16 pilots bear final responsibility for the fratricide incident, there existed other systemic shortcomings in air coordination and control procedures, as well as mission planning practices by the tactical flying units, that may have prevented the accident had they been corrected."

== Schmidt's rationale and statement ==
In his official statement to the family and friends of the dead and injured Canadians, Schmidt stated:

I believed at the time that my flight lead's transmission to 'check master arm, check laser arm,' indicated he concurred with my decision that the situation required self-defense.

I would like to say first and foremost that I sincerely regret the accident that occurred... My heart goes out to the families of the men killed and injured in what can only be described as a tragic accident in the 'fog of war'. The accident was truly unfortunate and I am sorry that it happened.

I was called upon to make a perfect decision in a rapidly unfolding combat environment. I had to make that decision with what I now know, with the acuity of 20/20 hindsight, was imperfect information...

My perception was that we had been ambushed, as we had been briefed that Taliban were expected to use ambush tactics in and around Kandahar. I believed that the projectiles posed a real and present danger to our flight and specifically to my flight lead...

While I was assigned to the 332 Aerospace Expeditionary Group, I was never alerted to the possibility of live-fire training being conducted in the war zone. Further, at no time prior to our mission on 17 April 2002 were we briefed of a live-fire exercise at Tarnak Farms or in the vicinity of Kandahar. Nor were we ever advised while airborne by the AWACS command and control platform, or any calls on the Guard frequency, that there was a live-fire exercise ongoing anywhere in the war zone. Because such an event in a combat area would have been so unusual and unexpected, information about such training would be the type of information we would note so that we could avoid it. This lack of information is the one link in the chain, which if corrected, would surely have avoided this accident...

I attempted to use warning shots to suppress the threat but I was denied by bossman (the controller on the AWACS). I finally communicated to bossman that I was engaging in self-defence because my flight lead was at risk of being shot down.

Finally, I would like to tell the families of Sgt. Leger, Cpl. Dyer, Pte. Green and Pte. Smith that I am deeply sorry for what happened... I will always regret what happened that night. Next, I apologize to each of the men I wounded... I think about the men who were killed and the men who were injured. As a family man myself with a wife and two young boys, I can only imagine how difficult it is for they and their families to grapple with the fact that these men volunteered to serve their country and were killed in a wartime accident. I sincerely want them to know that my heart goes out to them and that I am truly sorry for their loss."

== Article 32 hearing ==
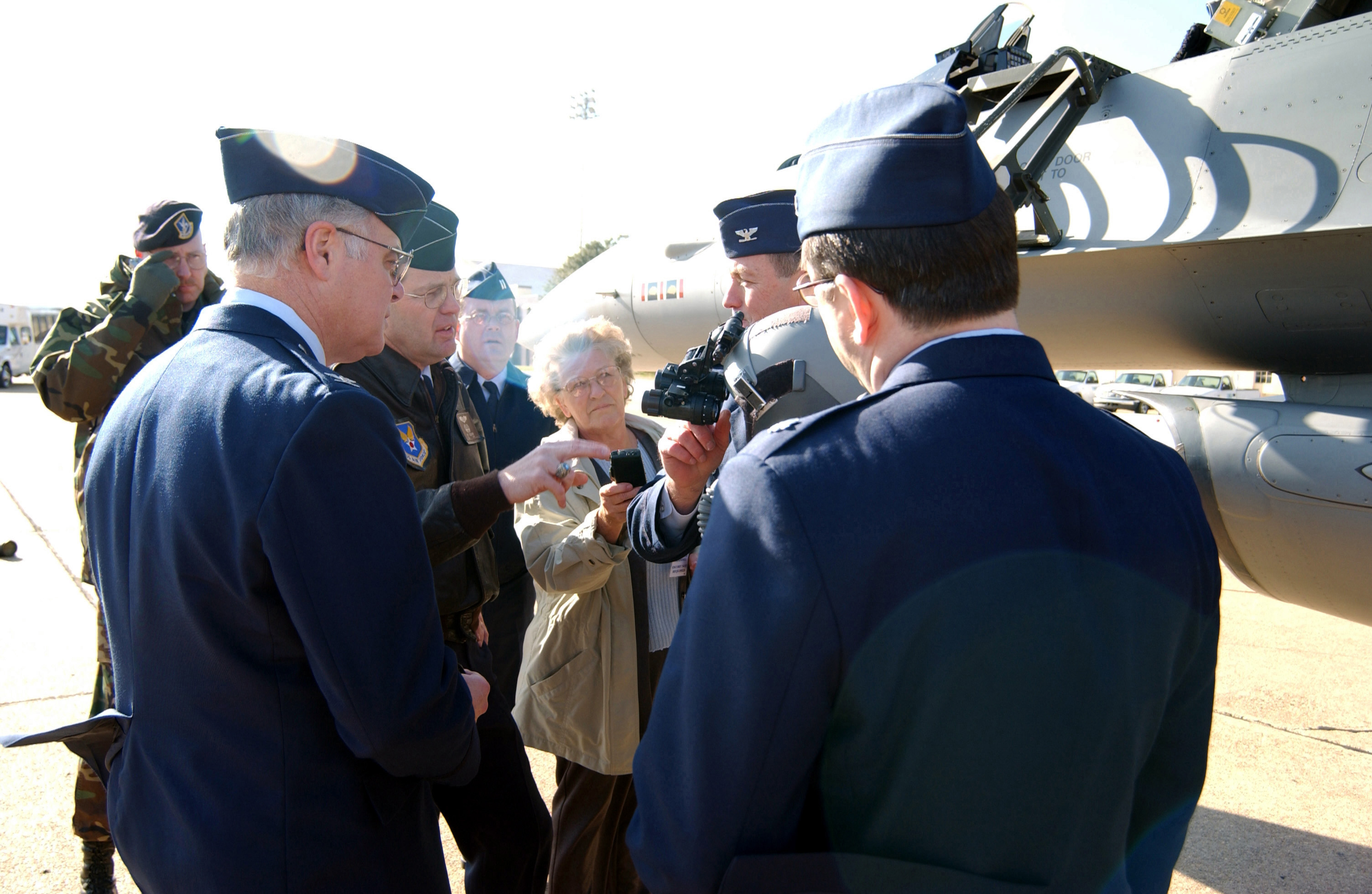
Colonel Robert Murphy briefs the investigating officer, Colonel Patrick Rosenow (in leather jacket), about a helmet and night vision goggles during the Article 32 hearing.

During the Article 32 hearing, five F-16 pilots testified, including one who had led the US Board of Inquiry. All five pilots agreed under oath that the dropping of the bomb by Schmidt was a reasonable action. Michael Friscolanti summarized their comments in his book Friendly Fire:

- Major John Milton: A reasonable fighter pilot could have believed he was trapped in a threat envelope and had no choice but to drop a bomb. It was Maj. Schmidt's right to roll in self-defense, even after the "hold fire" order.
- Lieutenant Colonel Ralph Viets: Rolling in would be a reasonable response because Maj. Schmidt was reasonable to believe that he was already in the threat envelope of a rocket-based weapons system.
- Colonel David C. Nichols: A reasonably prudent F-16 pilot might have done the same thing. "Combat aviation is not a science. It's an art."
- Lieutenant Colonel Craig Fisher: There were no "significant departures from flight discipline". A reasonable fighter pilot would have egressed the area, but that doesn't mean Maj. Schmidt and Maj. Umbach were reckless.
- Major General Stephen T. Sargeant: A reasonable pilot never would have believed that the fire on the ground was a threat to his flight. And even if he did, turning, descending, and decelerating was an unreasonable reaction. However, disregarding all the alleged reckless maneuvers Maj. Schmidt made to reach the spot where he invoked self-defense, dropping a bomb at that instant was not unreasonable. In other words, if Maj. Schmidt suddenly woke up at 14,000 feet (4,300 m) and four nautical miles (7 km) away from the mystery fire, it would be reasonable to drop a bomb in self-defense.

One of the issues highlighted by the Inquiry related to the use of amphetamines in combat. In testimony it was revealed that Schmidt and Umbach were told by their superiors to use "go pills" on their missions, and the airmen blamed the incident on the drugs. This was a significant part of the defense of the two pilots. Schmidt's defense also blamed the fog of war.

Another issue that was evident, but remained largely in the background, was the quality of communications between the various coalition forces in Afghanistan.

== Disposition ==
On September 11, 2002, William Umbach and Harry Schmidt were officially charged with four counts of negligent manslaughter, eight counts of aggravated assault, and one count of dereliction of duty. Umbach's charges were later dismissed. Schmidt's charges were reduced on June 30, 2003, to just the dereliction of duty charge.

On July 6, 2004, Umbach was reprimanded for leadership failures and allowed to retire.

U.S. Lieutenant General Bruce Carlson found Schmidt guilty of dereliction of duty in what the U.S. military calls a "non-judicial hearing" before a senior officer (see Article 15). He was fined nearly $5,700 in pay and reprimanded. The reprimand, written by Carlson, said Schmidt had "flagrantly disregarded a direct order", "exercised a total lack of basic flight discipline", and "blatantly ignored the applicable rules of engagement".

The letter of reprimand given to Schmidt read in part:

"You acted shamefully on 17 April 2002 over Tarnak Farms, Afghanistan, exhibiting arrogance and a lack of flight discipline. When your flight lead warned you to "make sure it's not friendlies" and the Airborne Warning and Control System aircraft controller directed you to "stand by" and later to "hold fire", you should have marked the location with your targeting pod. Thereafter, if you believed, as you stated, you and your leader were threatened, you should have taken a series of evasive actions and remained at a safe distance to await further instructions from AWACS. Instead, you closed on the target and blatantly disobeyed the direction to "hold fire." Your failure to follow that order is inexcusable. I do not believe you acted in defense of Major Umbach or yourself. Your actions indicate that you used your self-defense declaration as a pretext to strike a target, which you rashly decided was an enemy firing position, and about which you had exhausted your patience in waiting for clearance from the Combined Air Operations Center to engage. You used the inherent right of self-defense as an excuse to wage your own war."

In April 2006, Schmidt sued the USAF, saying that the military violated the federal Privacy Act by disclosing parts of his military record without his permission and by doing so ruined his reputation. On September 22, 2007, U.S. District Judge Jeanne Scott ruled against Schmidt, stating, "The release of Schmidt's reprimand gave the public ... insight into the way in which the United States government was holding its pilot accountable. Thus considering all of the circumstances, the disclosures at issue were clearly warranted."

This was the most serious case of friendly fire to have been experienced by the Canadian Forces in joint operations with allies since the Korean War.

== Legacy ==
Private Green's mother, Doreen Coolen, was chosen by the Royal Canadian Legion to be the Silver Cross Mother for the Remembrance Day ceremony in Ottawa in 2002.

Private Smith's mother, Charlotte Lynn Smith, was named the Silver Cross Mother in 2003. Camp Nathan Smith in Afghanistan was named after him.

Corporal Dyer's mother, Agatha Dyer, was chosen as the Silver Cross Mother in 2004. Ainsworth Dyer Memorial Bridge in Rundle Park, Edmonton, was named in his memory.

Sergeant Léger's mother, Claire Léger, was chosen as the Silver Cross Mother in 2005. Léger was awarded the South-West Asia Service Medal and the United States Bronze Star Medal posthumously.
