= Canadian Forces casualties in Afghanistan =

Canadian military fatalities during the War in Afghanistan

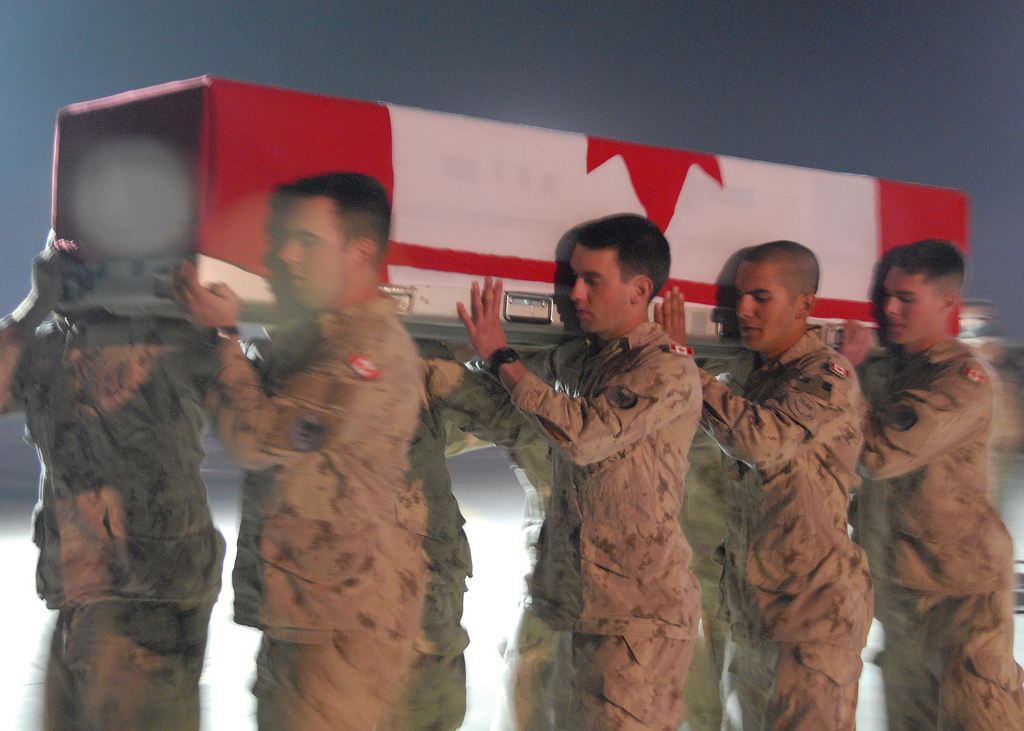
Canadian Forces personnel carry the coffin of a deceased comrade onto an aircraft at Kandahar Air Field, 1 February 2009

The number of Canadian Forces' fatalities resulting from Canadian military activities in Afghanistan is the largest for any single Canadian military mission since the Korean War between 1950 and 1953. A total of 159 Canadian Forces personnel and 7 civilians were killed in the conflict.

== Specifics ==
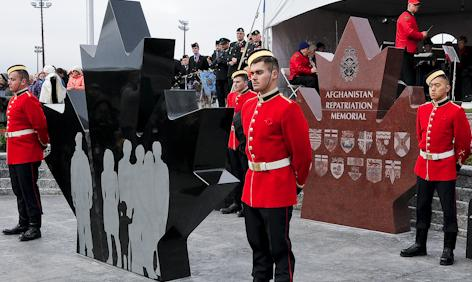
Royal Military College of Canada cadets attend unveiling of Afghanistan Repatriation Memorial, Trenton, Ontario 10 Nov 2012

The first casualties occurred in the Tarnak Farm incident, in which four Canadians were killed and eight seriously wounded when a United States warplane dropped a bomb on a training exercise in the belief that the Canadians were enemy soldiers. The four servicemen were honoured at an event unprecedented in Canada in 2002. The Skyreach Centre in Edmonton, Alberta, was filled to capacity for a tribute ceremony for the four deceased soldiers that included personal messages from Governor General Adrienne Clarkson, Prime Minister Jean Chretien, the Chief of Defence Staff, Premier of Alberta and Premier of Manitoba, and the Mayor of Edmonton, most of whom attended the service. Subsequently, deceased soldiers have been honoured by much smaller services.

On 9 April 2007, Queen Elizabeth II made reference to all the deceased Canadians in Afghanistan when she rededicated the Vimy Memorial "to their eternal remembrance, to Canada, to all who would serve the cause of freedom, and to those who have lost their lives in Afghanistan."

Further, in honour of all those who died during the Afghan mission, the section of Ontario's Highway 401 along which deceased soldiers are carried from Canadian Forces Base Trenton to Toronto after repatriation was named the Highway of Heroes.

All those Canadian Forces personnel who are killed during the mission are posthumously awarded the Sacrifice Medal and their spouse or next of kin receive the Memorial Cross. The first deployed Canadian woman combatant to die in combat was Captain Nichola Goddard. The first soldier from Quebec to die in the mission in Afghanistan was Cpl Simon Longtin who died of his wounds resulting from an IED blast.

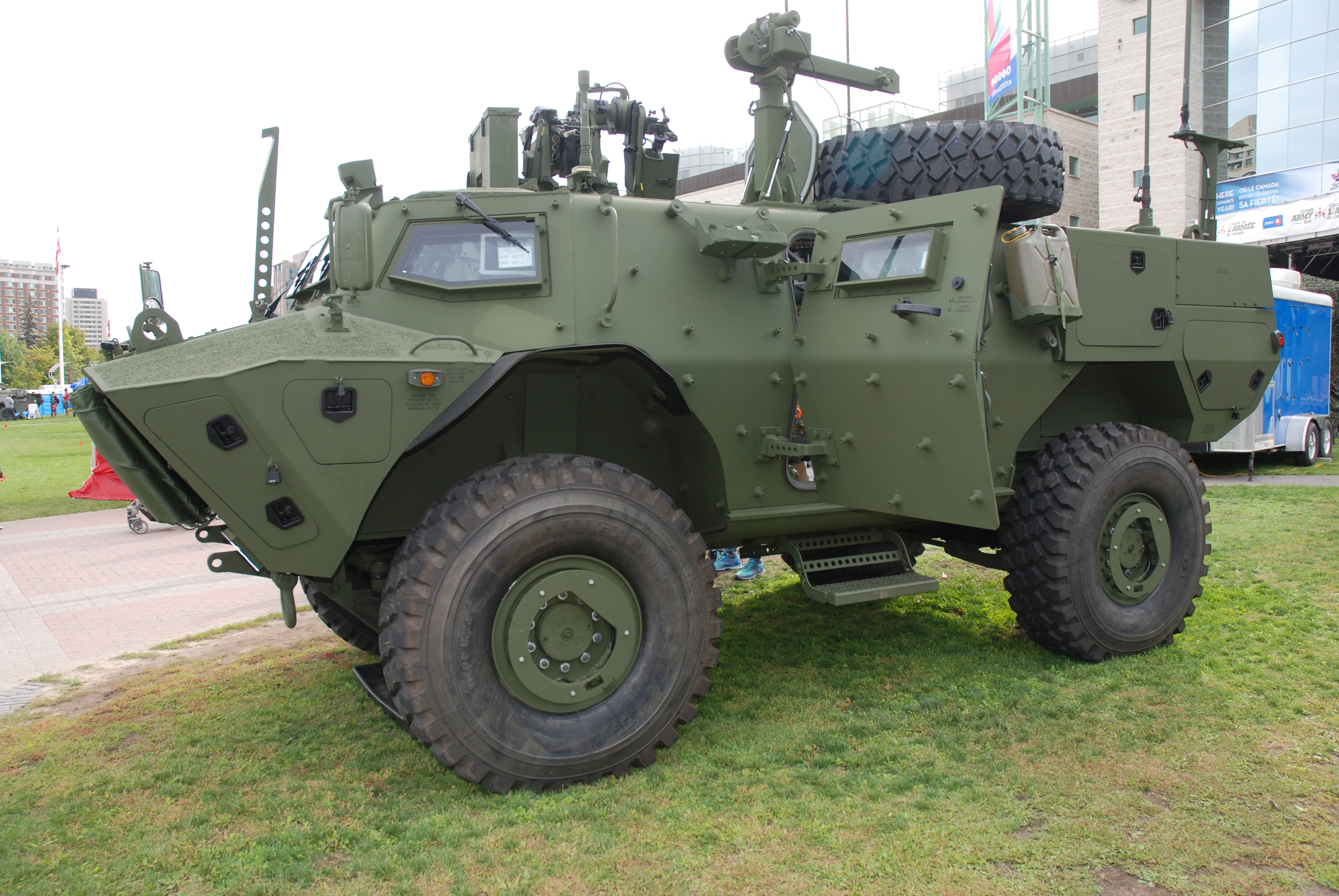
Textron TAPV

The death of Anthony Boneca initiated debate about the combat readiness of Canadian reservists, wherein questions were asked not only about the suitability of employing reservists, but also the role of the media in reporting comments by grief-stricken relatives, such as those made by Boneca's partner's father. The suitability of the Iltis vehicle was also questioned heavily following a land mine incident on 2 Oct 2003 that claimed the lives of two Canadian soldiers, Cpl Robbie Beerenfenger and Sgt Robert Short, leading the military to thereafter acquire Mercedes-Benz G-Class and RG-31 Nyala armoured patrol vehicles. The Textron TAPV was developed by the CAF over the period 2012-2016 (when it entered service) especially to protect soldiers in Afghanistan.

The first Canadian woman to die of suicide on an overseas deployment was Major Michelle Mendes, an intelligence officer, who died from self-inflicted gunshot wounds at Kandahar Airfield on 24 Apr 2009 only a few days after her arrival.

The first gravely injured Canadian soldier to redeploy in Kandahar was Captain Simon Mailloux in November 2009. Capt Mailloux had been gravely injured in November 2007 following an IED incident in the Panjwayi district and his left leg had to be amputated. Two more Canadian soldiers, Corporal Nicholas Beauchamp and Private Michel Levesque, died in the same incident.

The highest ranking casualty was sustained on 18 May 2010, when Colonel Geoff Parker was killed after a suicide bomber drove a car full of explosives into a NATO convoy during morning rush hour on the edge of Kabul. Five U.S. soldiers and 12 Afghan civilians were also killed in this attack.

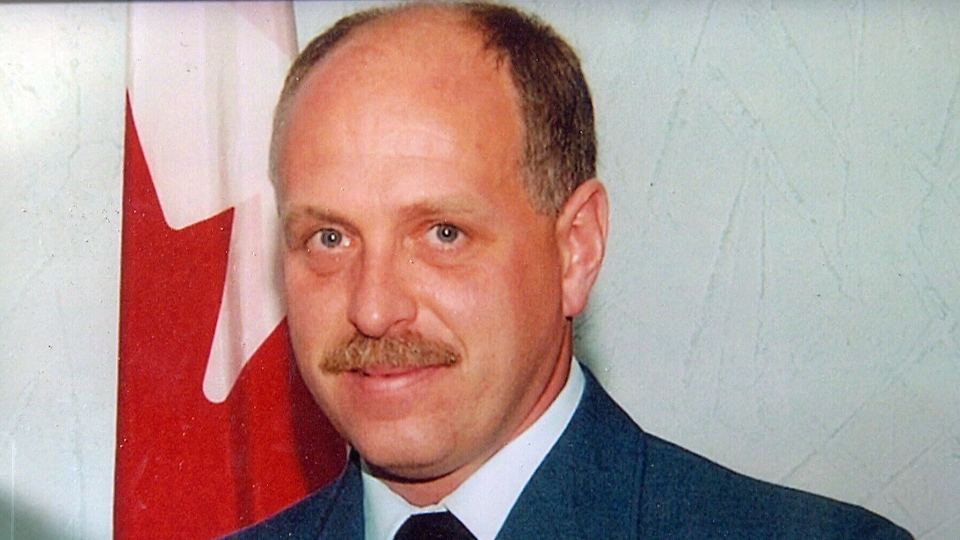
Cpl Jacques Larocque

On 28 November 2014, Veterans Affairs Canada attributed Corporal Jacques Larocque's (8 AMS Trenton) death (27 August 2005) to the Afghanistan mission. On 21 September 2015, the city of Quinte West confirmed they were to add another name to the monument, Cpl Jacques Larocque's name was added on 16 October 2015 as the 159th Canadian soldier who died in active service on the Afghan mission.

== Fatalities ==
Fatalities by rank
Rank	Number
General Officers (officiers généraux)
Total	0
Senior Officers (officiers supérieurs)
Colonels	1
Majors	3
Total	4
Junior Officers (officiers subalternes)
Captains	6
Lieutenants	3
'Total	9
NCM Senior Rank (Rangs supérieurs)
Chief Warrant Officer	1
Master Warrant Officer	1
Warrant Officers	6
Sergeants (17 Sergeants, 1 Petty Officer 2nd Class)	18
Total	26
NCM Junior Ranks (Rangs subalternes)
Master Corporals	16
Corporals (55 Corporals, 3 Bombardiers)	58
Privates (30 Privates, 10 Troopers, 1 Gunner, 5 Sappers)	46
Total	120
Total	159

Fatalities by cause
Cause	Number
Enemy action
Explosives	97
Direct fire	22
Suicide attacks	13
Total	132
Non-enemy action
Friendly-fire	6
Vehicle accidents	6
Helicopter accidents	2
Accidental falls	2
Accidental gunshots	2
Suicides	3
Unspecified	4
Illness	2
Total	27
Total	159

Fatailties by Unit or Formation
Unit	Branch	Total
Princess Patricia's Canadian Light Infantry	Infantry	43
The Royal Canadian Regiment	Infantry	27
Royal 22e Régiment	Infantry	13
Royal Canadian Dragoons	Armour	12
1 Combat Engineer Regiment	Engineer	6
5e Régiment du genie de combat	Engineer	6
2 Combat Engineer Regiment	Engineer	4
The Loyal Edmonton Regiment (4th Battalion, PPCLI)	Infantry	3
1st Regiment, Royal Canadian Horse Artillery	Artillery	3
5e Régiment d'artillerie légère du Canada	Artillery	2
12e Régiment blindé du Canada	Armour	2
2 CMBG Headquarters & Signal Squadron	HQ Support	2
1 Field Ambulance	Medical	2
2 Field Ambulance	Medical	2
5 Field Ambulance	Medical	2
15 Field Ambulance	Medical	1
28 Field Ambulance	Medical	1
1 Canadian Field Hospital	Medical	1
Intelligence Branch	HQ Support	1
Canadian Special Operations Forces Command	HQ Support	1
Canadian Special Operations Regiment	HQ Support	1
Land Force Central Area	HQ Support	1
Army News Team, 3 Area Support Group (5th Division Support Group)	HQ Support	1
The King's Own Calgary Regiment (RCAC)	Armour	1
Lord Strathcona's Horse (Royal Canadians)	Armour	2
Land Force Western Area HQ from 20th Field Artillery Regiment, RCA	HQ Support	1
5th (British Columbia) Field Artillery Regiment, RCA	Artillery	1
84th Independent Field Battery, RCA	Artillery	1
The Lake Superior Scottish Regiment	Infantry	1
The Black Watch (Royal Highland Regiment) of Canada	Infantry	1
The Nova Scotia Highlanders	Infantry	1
The Princess Louise Fusiliers	Infantry	1
The Royal Westminster Regiment	Infantry	1
The Lincoln and Welland Regiment	Infantry	1
The Royal Newfoundland Regiment	Infantry	1
Canadian Forces Military Police Detachment at CFD Dundurn	Military Police	1
2 Military Police Platoon	Military Police	1
1 Garrison Military Police Company, Detachment CFB Wainwright	Military Police	1
41 Combat Engineer Regiment	Engineer	1
425 Tactical Fighter Squadron	Air Force	1
430 Tactical Helicopter Squadron	Air Force	1
8 Air Maintenance Squadron, 8 Wing	Air Force	1
1 Fleet Diving Unit (Atlantic)	Navy	1
The Irish Regiment of Canada	Infantry	1

== Notable fatalities ==
On 17 May 2006, 26-year-old Captain Nichola Goddard from the 1 Royal Canadian Horse Artillery was killed during operations against insurgents. She was the first Canadian female soldier to die in combat.

On 4 September the same year, Olympic athlete Private Mark Anthony Graham from the 1st Battalion The Royal Canadian Regiment was killed when two US A-10 Thunderbolt II ground attack aircraft strafed Canadian troops in a friendly fire incident. More than 30 other Canadian soldiers were wounded in the incident.

On 28 Oct 2009, Saskatoon born, 26-year-old Lieutenant Justin Boyes, assigned to the Kandahar Provincial Reconstruction Team, from 3rd Battalion, Princess Patricia's Canadian Light Infantry (3PPCLI) was killed in an explosion while leading a foot patrol 20 km southwest of Kandahar City in Panjwayi district.

== Non-fatal casualties ==
Figures released by DND in June 2013 show that the total number of Canadian soldiers injured and wounded in more than ten years of war reached 2,071 by the end of December 2012. 1,436 of these are listed as NBI (Non battle injuries) and 635 are listed as WIA (wounded in action).

Following a policy change at the beginning of 2010, the Canadian military began to withhold all injury reports, releasing only statistics after the end of a calendar year, citing security reasons.

The Department of National Defence also refuses to disclose the nature or severity of injuries and wounds, as it is an operational secret.

== Honors and awards ==
The Sacrifice Medal may be awarded to members of the Canadian Forces that they were deployed as part of a military mission, that have, on or after 7 October 2001, died or been wounded under honourable circumstances as a direct result of hostile action on the condition that the wounds that were sustained required treatment by a physician and the treatment has been documented. Most of the casualties on this page would have received the Sacrifice Medal along with the General Campaign Star for their deployment in support of the combat Operation Athena.

== See also ==
- Canada's role in the War in Afghanistan
- Coalition casualties in Afghanistan
- Criticism of the war on terror
- Opposition to the War in Afghanistan (2001–2021)
- International public opinion on the war in Afghanistan
- Protests against the War in Afghanistan (2001–present)
