= Camp Nathan Smith =

Former Canadian and later American military base in Kandahar, Afghanistan

Coordinates: 31°37′47″N 65°44′08″E

- Kandahar in Afghanistan
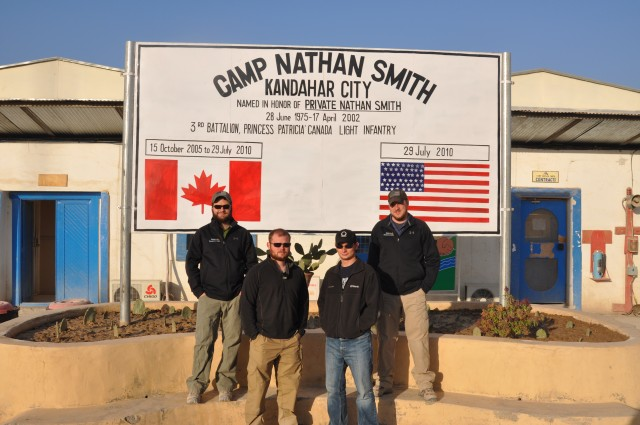

Site information
- Type: Military army base
- Owner: Department of National Defence
- Operator: Canadian Armed Forces; 2003 – 2011

Location
- Location in Afghanistan

Site history
- Built: 2003
- Built by: United States Army
- In use: 2003 – 2013

Camp Nathan Smith was a Canadian and later American military base in Kandahar, Afghanistan. Originally, it was an abandoned fruit factory. The camp was located in the heart of Kandahar City, north of Highway 1 and south of the Canal.

In November 2003, the site was reconstructed by US Army soldiers of C Battery, 3rd Battalion, 321st Field Artillery Regiment from Fort Bragg, North Carolina. The camp was turned over to the Canadian Forces in 2005 and named for Private Nathan Smith of the 3rd Battalion, Princess Patricia's Canadian Light Infantry. Smith was killed in the Tarnak Farm friendly fire incident.

In July 2010, the 1st Brigade Combat Team, 4th Infantry Division (United States), took command of Camp Nathan Smith. On June 19, 2011, a transfer of authority ceremony took place on Camp Nathan Smith signifying the end of 1st Brigade Combat Team, 4th Infantry Division’s deployment and the beginning of its sister brigade 2nd Brigade Combat Team, 4th Infantry Division’s partnership with the Government of the Islamic Republic of Afghanistan and the Afghan National Security Forces.

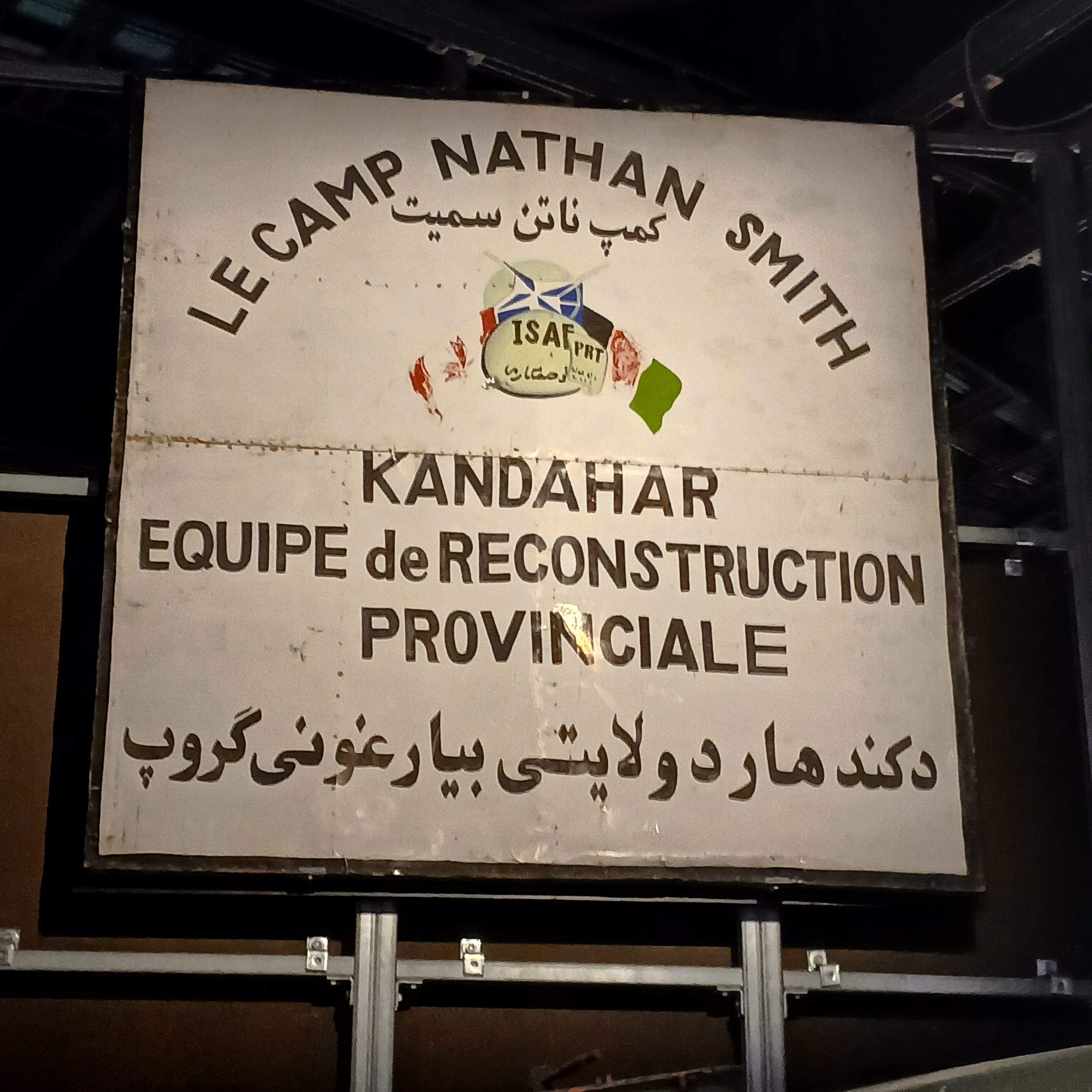
A sign for Camp Nathan Smith at the Canadian War Museum in Ottawa, Ontario, Canada

The Canadians left on June 22, 2011.

On October 27, 2011, a coordinated attack from insurgents within the city occurred at the camp. Although one interpreter, a member of SFA Team 5, was killed and eight ISAF soldiers were wounded, the attack was deemed unsuccessful. The camp's location in the heart of Kandahar City allowed ISAF forces to quickly respond to enemy attacks during the early years of the Afghan war. As Kandahar City became more peaceful its purpose changed to a place for meetings to discuss city governance, developmental projects, and to train Afghan police officers.

There was a small post exchange, a local bazaar, an aid station, a gym, a water reservoir and two dining facilities at Camp Nathan Smith. One of the dining facilities was named after Army SSG Sheldon Tate. Tate died July 13, 2010, while repelling an insurgent attack on an Afghan police compound in Kandahar City.

On July 31, 2013, Camp Nathan Smith was transferred to the Afghan Uniform Police by the US Army (1 Armored, 1st Brigade Combat Team). The Afghan Uniform Police already had a quick reaction force at the camp, and it intended to move two more police companies there. The Afghans also planned on developing a school for women at the camp. Basic infrastructure was left behind, including generators and a working fuel point.

== U.S. Commands located at Camp Nathan Smith in chronological order ==
- 4th Brigade Combat Team, 82nd Airborne Division (-July 2010)
- 1st Brigade, 4th Infantry Division (July 2010 - July 2011)
- 2nd Brigade, 4th Infantry Division (July 2011 - April 2012)
- 2nd Brigade, 2nd Infantry Division (April 2012 - January 2013)
- 1st Brigade, 1st Armored Division (January 2013 - July 2013)
