= Afghanistan Repatriation Memorial =

War memorial in Trenton, Ontario, Canada

Coordinates: 44.104024°N 77.548428°W

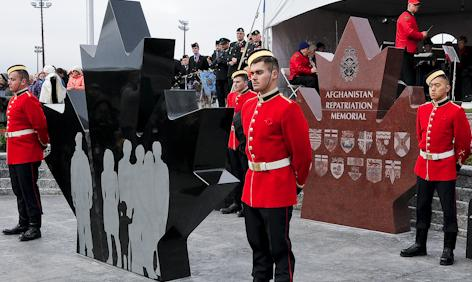
Afghanistan Repatriation Memorial

The Afghanistan Repatriation Memorial is a war memorial in Trenton, Ontario, Canada to memorialize Canadian Forces casualties in Afghanistan. The memorial was funded by a public fundraiser announced in July, 2011, and opened November 11, 2012.

== See also ==
- Canadian war memorials
