= Battle of Hill 187 =

1953 battle of the Korean War

- Part of the Korean War
Date	2–3 May 1953
Location	Yeoncheon County, Gyeonggi Province, South Korea
Result	Indecisive

Belligerents
Canada	China

Commanders and leaders
(Canada) Gerard Balfour Meynell †; (Canada) Edgar Herbet Hollyer	Unknown

Strength
Unknown	400 men (initially)

Casualties and losses
32–39 dead; 34–45 wounded; 11 missing; 9 captured	Unknown

The Battle of Hill 187 was a battle between Canadian and Chinese forces during the Korean War which took place north of the city of Gapyeong. The Battle of Hill 187 was one of the last battles of the Korean War.

== First attack ==
On 2 May 1953, Lieutenant Gerard Balfour Meynell of the 3rd Battalion, Royal Canadian Regiment, was leading a patrol near Hill 187. Chinese forces numbering 400 men attacked the patrol. During the ambush Meynell and half of the patrol were killed, with remnants of the patrol managing to withdraw to defensive positions on Hill 187.

== Defence of the hill ==
After a heavy artillery barrage, the Chinese launched numerous human wave attacks in an attempt to take the hill. One wave blew gaps in the wire, another wave threw grenades and the other wave was the assault group. The 81st Field Regiment, RCA, laid down defensive fire in an attempt to keep Chinese forces back. Canadian heavy machine gun, mortar, tank, and artillery fire inflicted heavy casualties on Chinese forces who continued to advance due to their numerical superiority. Tanks from B Squadron of Lord Strathcona's Horse supported the 3rd Battalion of the RCR during the battle. After reaching the trench line, Chinese soldiers destroyed defensive works and took prisoners and hand-to-hand fighting ensued. To prevent a major breakthrough, Lieutenant Edgar Herbet Hollyer ordered artillery to fire on his own position while also ordering his men to retreat into their bunkers. Hollyer survived and was awarded the Military Cross for his actions. Eventually, the Chinese withdrew after Canadian forces reoccupied their positions.

== Casualties ==
=== Canadian ===
The 3rd RCR's casualties were 26 dead, 27 wounded and 7 captured. Other sources place the 3rd Battalion's casualties at 33 dead, 41 wounded, and 11 missing. Princess Patricia's Canadian Light Infantry's casualties were 4 dead (2 gunners and 2 soldiers), and 7 wounded. The 81st Field Regiment, RCA, suffered 2 dead. This makes the total number of Canadian casualties during the battle 32–39 dead, 34–45 wounded, 11 missing and 9 captured.

=== Chinese ===
Chinese forces suffered much heavier casualties during the battle. Canadian veteran Donovan Redknap of the 81st Field Regiment, Royal Canadian Artillery, said that the Chinese "had no regard for casualties, didn't matter. They just attacked en masse".

== Legacy ==
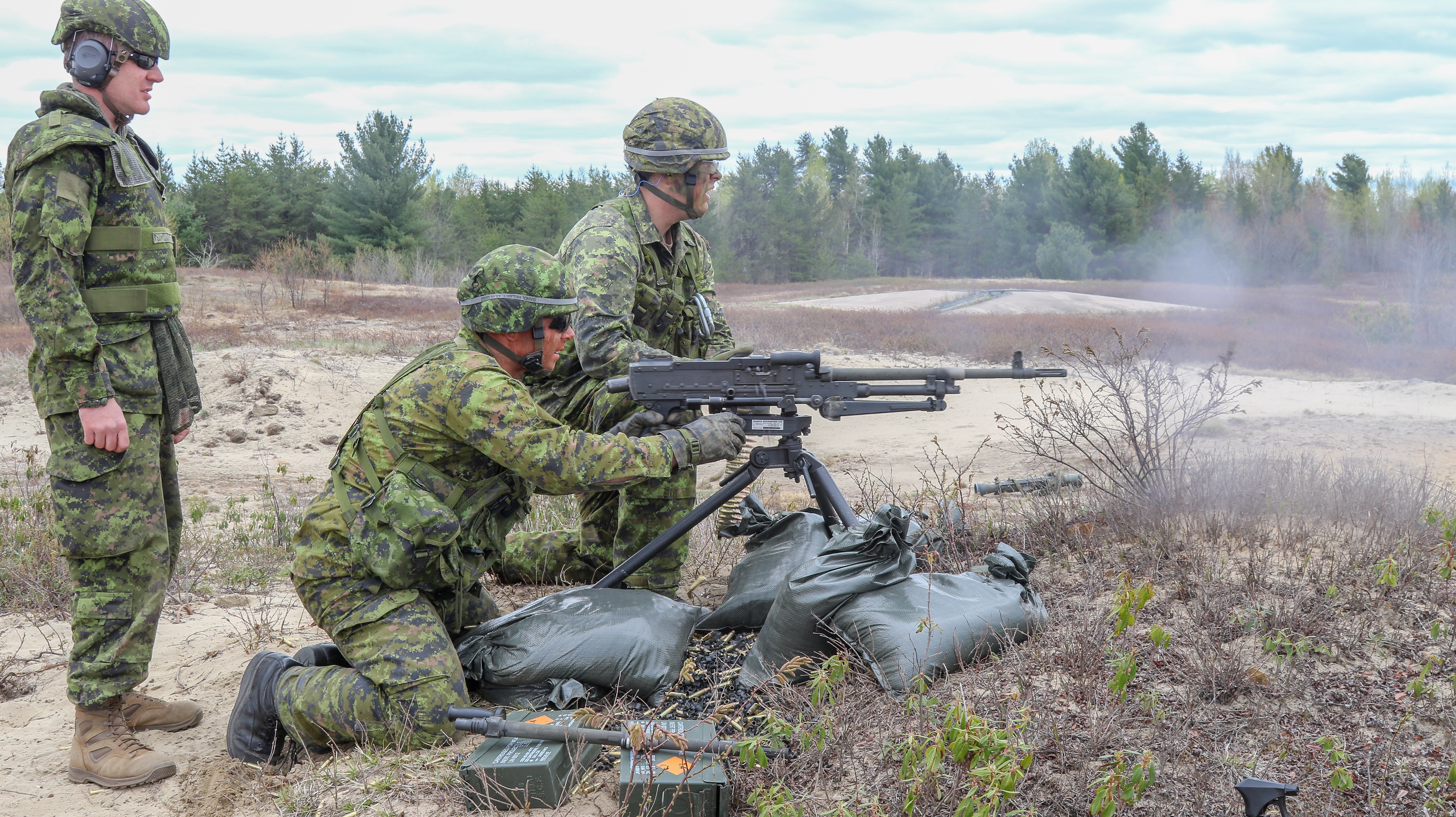
Canadian soldiers participating in the Hill 187 competition.

The Battle of Hill 187 was one of the last major battles that Canadian forces participated in before the Korean Armistice Agreement. Brigadier General Jean Allandale considered the battle a defeat. Nevertheless, retired United States Marine Lieutenant Colonel Jack Ogelsby said that the Battle of Hill 187 "was a very significant battle. It is because the troops survived that and distinguished themselves there that it became part of the regimental lore." The history of the battle is passed on to new members of the Royal Canadian Regiment. The Hill 187 Competition was named in honour of the battle.
