= 3rd Battalion, Royal Canadian Regiment =

3rd Battalion, The Royal Canadian Regiment
- Cypher of The Royal Canadian Regiment
- Active: 8 February 1900 – 1 October 1902; 9 December 1950 – 21 July 1954; 6 July 1970 – present
- Country: Canada
- Branch: Canadian Army
- Type: Light infantry
- Role: Airborne, air assault, complex terrain
- Size: Battalion
- Part of: 3rd Canadian Light Infantry Regiment
- Garrison/HQ: Foulkes Barracks, Petawawa
- Nickname: 3 RCR
- Motto: Pro patria (Latin for 'for country')
- Engagements: Korean War: Battle of Hill 187; Yugoslav Wars: Operation Palladium; War in Afghanistan
- Website: www.canada.ca/en/army/corporate/4-canadian-division/3-battailon-the-royal-canadian-regiment.html

Commanders
- Commanding officer: LCol Aaron Corey
- Deputy commanding officer: Maj Grant McDonald
- Regimental sergeant major: CWO Mike Martens

3rd Battalion, The Royal Canadian Regiment (3 RCR) is a regular force light infantry battalion of the Canadian Forces. 3 RCR's most notable service occurred in Korea, Germany, Bosnia and Afghanistan. In 2006–2010, the battalion was deployed to Kandahar Province, Afghanistan. All three rifle companies were deployed at various times during this period of combat. Also notable was the period between 2003 and 2004, when it was the initial Canadian Forces unit to serve as part of the International Security Assistance Force, deploying to Kabul in August 2003.

== History ==
=== Formation ===
The Royal Canadian Regiment was formed 21 December 1883, under the name of the "Infantry School Corps". The regiment was known by a variety of names until "The Royal Canadian Regiment" became official.

There have been three occasions when there have been more than one battalion of the RCR. First was during the time of the Second Boer War, when 2nd (Special Service) Battalion, The Royal Canadian Regiment of Infantry constituted Canada's initial involvement in that war. 3rd (Special Service) Battalion was formed on 8 February 1900 occupied Wellington Barracks in London, Ontario, on 25 March 1900. It conducted garrison duties there until it was disbanded on 1 October 1902. The second was at the tail end of the Second World War when 2nd Battalion RCR was formed for duty in Japan. Finally, during the Korean War, 3rd Battalion was formed on 10 January 1951. 3 RCR served in Korea from March 1953 until March 1954.

During a reorganization of the Canadian Army in the early 1950s, 3 RCR ceased being on the regular force order of battle. 3 RCR was the designation of the militia battalion of the RCR.

3 RCR was once again a regular force battalion when it assumed duties as a mechanised infantry battalion of 4 Canadian Mechanized Brigade Group, taking over 3 (Mechanized) Commando of the Canadian Airborne Regiment. It served in Baden, West Germany, until 1984, when it was replaced by 2nd Battalion Princess Patricia's Canadian Light Infantry. It then was based in Winnipeg as part of 1 Canadian Mechanized Brigade Group. It then returned to West Germany in 1988, where it stayed until 1993, following the end of the Cold War. It was then designated a so-called "10/90" battalion and was based at CFB Borden. "10/90" battalions were composed of 10% regular force members, and 90% reserve force members.

3 RCR was stood up as a full-fledged regular force infantry battalion in 1996, and was designated as a light infantry battalion, consisting of three rifle companies, a combat support company and a combat service support company:

- M Company (Airborne) – Jump Company
- N Company (Air Assault)
- O Company (Mountain Operations)
- Q Company (Combat Support)
- R Company (Combat Service Support)

=== Korean War ===
3 RCR replaced 2 RCR in Korea in early 1953. Early in May the battalion withstood a strong enemy assault on its position during the Battle of Hill 187. The attack was repulsed, but the engagement cost the regiment heavy casualties – 26 killed, 27 wounded and seven taken prisoner.

=== 3 RCR as a reserve battalion ===
In 1954 two Militia regiments in London, Ontario, the Canadian Fusiliers (City of London Regiment) (MG) and The Oxford Rifles were amalgamated and redesignated The London and Oxford Fusiliers (3rd Battalion, The Royal Canadian Regiment). This unit was allied with the RCR but remained a separate regiment until 1958 when it amalgamated with the RCR under the name 3rd Battalion, The Royal Canadian Regiment (London and Oxford Fusiliers), thus becoming the reserve component of the RCR.

The Militia battalion changed from the 3rd to the 4th Battalion in 1970 when The Canadian Guards were reduced to nil strength and the soldiers of that regiment's 2nd Battalion (at CFB Petawawa) became the restored 3rd Battalion, The RCR, on the Regular Force order of battle. The 1958 amalgamation also brought to the regiment the perpetuation of a number of battalions of the First World War Canadian Expeditionary Force: the 1st, 33rd, 71st, 142nd and 168th Battalions as well as the 2nd Battalion of the Canadian Machine Gun Corps.

=== Cold War ===
3 RCR was one of two infantry battalions that formed Canada's commitment to NATO. It assumed duties from 3 Mechanised Commando, Canadian Airborne Regiment in 1977. It was stationed in Baden-Söllingen, Germany, as part of 4 CMBG. It remained there until 1984, when it was replaced by 2nd Battalion, Princess Patricia's Canadian Light Infantry. 3 RCR was then stationed in Winnipeg, Manitoba. In 1988, 3 RCR was once again rotated to Germany. At this time, it deployed with four rifle companies instead of the usual three rifle companies. It consisted of the following:

- M Company (Mechanized Infantry)
- N Company (Mechanized Infantry)
- O Company (Mechanized Infantry)
- P Company (Mechanized Infantry)
- Q Company (Combat Support)
- R Company (Combat Service Support)

3 RCR remained in Germany until 1993, when 4 Canadian Mechanized Brigade Group was stood down following the end of the Cold War.

=== Bosnia and Herzegovina ===
3 RCR deployed to Bosnia and Herzegovina twice as part of SFOR. The first tour in 1998–1999 as Rotation 3 for Operation Palladium under command of Lieutenant-Colonel Jorgensen and then again in 2001 as Rotation 8 under command of Lieutenant-Colonel Thompson.

=== Afghanistan ===
3 RCR served in Afghanistan three times. The first tour was in Kabul in 2003/2004 as Rotation 0 for Operation Athena as part of the International Security Assistance Force (ISAF), the second consisting of Reconnaissance Platoon in 2005 as augmentation of the Royal Canadian Dragoons (RCD) reconnaissance squadron, during Rotation 4 of Operation Athena and Rotation 0 of Operation Archer in Kandahar. Later as Rotation 6 for Operation Athena in Kandahar in 2008/2009.

After seeing the unit in the reconstitution phase of the army training operations framework cycle, it was prepared once again for deployment. It stood up as the core of Task Force 3–08 Battle Group in January 2008 and assumed duties in Kandahar in September of that year. 3 RCR redeployed to Canada in April and May 2009. In 2010, O Company deployed as a component of the Task Force 1-10 Battle Group.

1st Platoon, M Company was featured in the Discovery Channel documentary series Combat School while training for their first operational deployment to Afghanistan.

==== Kabul ====
As part of Canada's commitment to Afghanistan as part of ISAF, 3 RCR deployed to Kabul, in summer 2003. It was based out of Camp Julien. The 3 RCR Battlegroup (3 RCR BG) was augmented by "C" Company, 1 RCR. 3 RCR BG served in Kabul until early 2004, when it was replaced by a battle group of the Royal 22^{e} Régiment. In 2005 the Reconnaissance Platoon, including a sniper section, was attached to the RCD reconnaissance squadron for Rotation 4 of Operation Athena and the subsequent Rotation 0 of Operation Archer as Canada's involvement in Afghanistan transitioned to Kandahar.

==== Kandahar ====
In anticipation of its deployment to Afghanistan in autumn 2008, 3 RCR reroled into a mechanized infantry battalion. It formed the core of Task Force 3–08 Battle Group (TF 3–08 BG), augmented by:

- G Company, 2nd Battalion, RCR
- A Squadron, Lord Strathcona's Horse (Royal Canadians)
- D Squadron, RCD
- 24 Field Squadron, 2 Combat Engineer Regiment
- F Battery, 2nd Regiment, Royal Canadian Horse Artillery

(A Squadron was augmented by a troop from the RCD.)

3 RCR BG served in Kandahar from 21 September 2008 until 15 April 2009.

Counter-insurgency operations in 2010

In 2010, O Company was deployed to Khandahar as a mechanized rifle company in support of the 1 RCR Battle Group as a part of Task Force 1-10. Having completed extensive training in Fort Irwin, California, and CFB Petawawa, O Company was ready to fight in counter-insurgency-style combat. While deployed in theatre, O Company's three mechanized rifle platoons were individually deployed to various combat outposts in Panjwayi District, where they were in a state of continuous combat over the summer of 2010. All three platoons were proactively engaged in counter-insurgency operations. Over the course of the deployment, one platoon, who were located along 'Route Nightmare', suffered a high number of casualties from IED and ambush attacks. Despite 2010's fighting season being the deadliest on record, O Company suffered no combat deaths. No members of O Company were awarded medals for valour or for bravery.

=== Other ===
In 2010, the M (Parachute) Company Group, consisting of combat engineer, mortar group, medical, and signals attachments took shape. They deployed as a group for the first time in February 2011 participating in an exercise with the US Army 82nd Airborne Division.

Shortly thereafter, N (Airmobile) Company, deployed to Yuma, Arizona, United States, to participate in the US Marine Corps' Weapons and Tactics Instructors course.

O Company were given greater attention, as well, and began preparations to give the battalion a fast-rope capability and successfully conducted their first series of fast-rope training exercises.

In late October and early November 2018, a contingent from the battalion, alongside the Royal Canadian Artillery Band, which provided musical support, mounted the Queen's Guard. The event was one of the rare occasions that a Canadian Forces unit wore an authorized Atholl-grey winter greatcoat.

== Cap badge ==
"An eight-pointed diamond cut star; upon the star a raised circle surmounted by the crown; within the raised circle, the block letters "VRI", the Imperial Cypher of Queen Victoria." (Description of the badge of The RCR as presented in Regiments and Corps of the Canadian Army, published by the Army Historical Section, 1964)

The letters VRI on the cap badge of the RCR stand for Victoria Regina Imperatrix, which is Latin for "Victoria, Queen and Empress". The right to wear the imperial cypher and crown was granted to the regiment by Queen Victoria in 1893.

When a royal or imperial cypher forms part of the badge of a regiment it is normal for it to change with each succeeding sovereign. During the period 1901 to 1919, the officially authorized versions of the regiment's cap badge were those with Edward VII's and George V's cyphers, although the regiment continued to use the "VRI" ensigned badges throughout this time while petitioning for their formal return. In 1919, George V granted the RCR permission to wear "VRI" in perpetuity – a unique privilege.

== Regimental colours ==
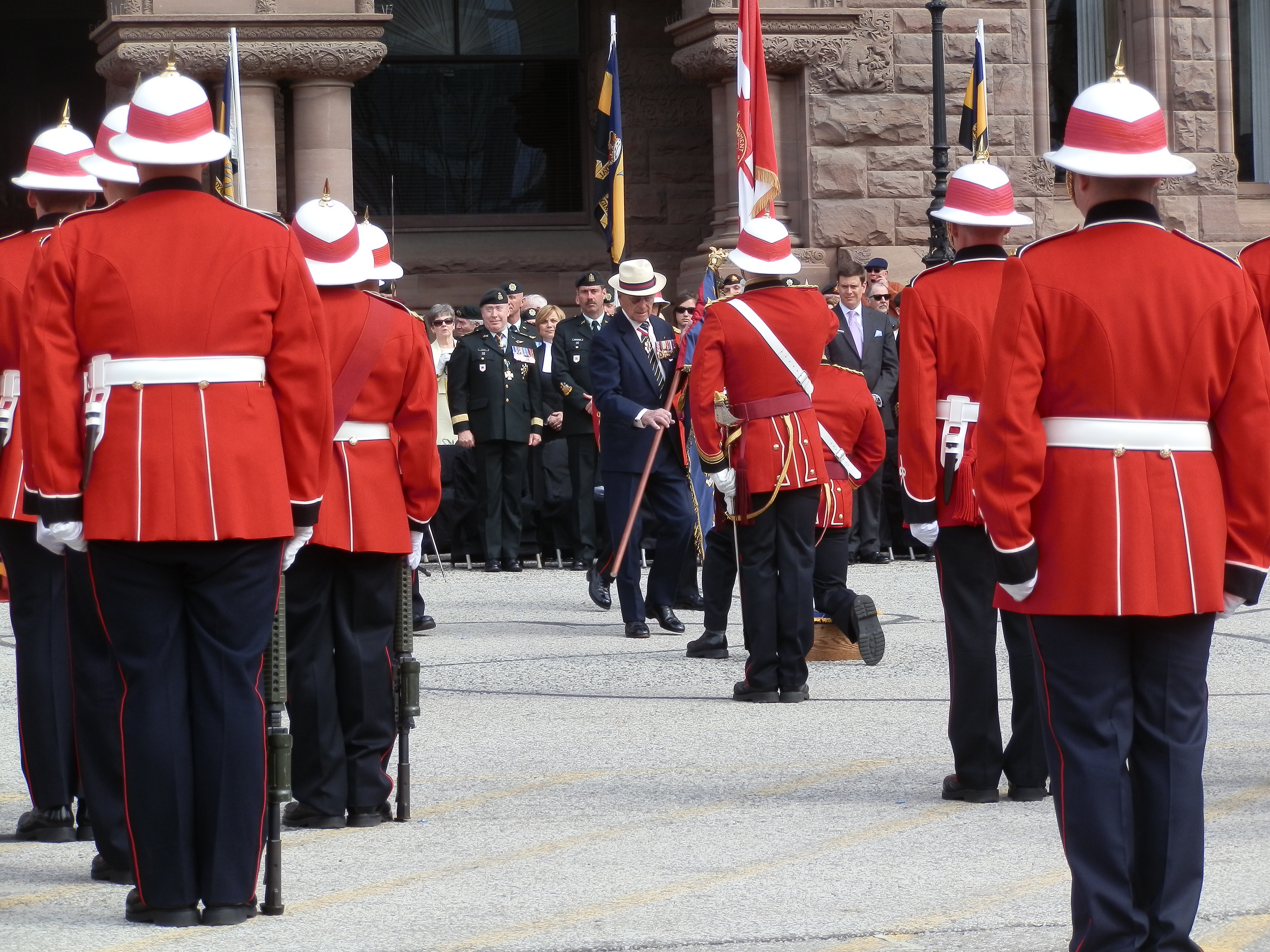
The Duke of Edinburgh, Colonel-in-Chief of RCR, presenting the 3rd Battalion with their Regimental Colours in April 2013.

The 3rd Battalion received their regimental colours from Prince Philip, Duke of Edinburgh, the regiment's colonel-in-chief, during a private working visit to Toronto in April 2013. The colours were received at Queen's Park and followed by a parade back to Fort York.
