= Camp Julien =

Camp Julien
- Kabul in Afghanistan
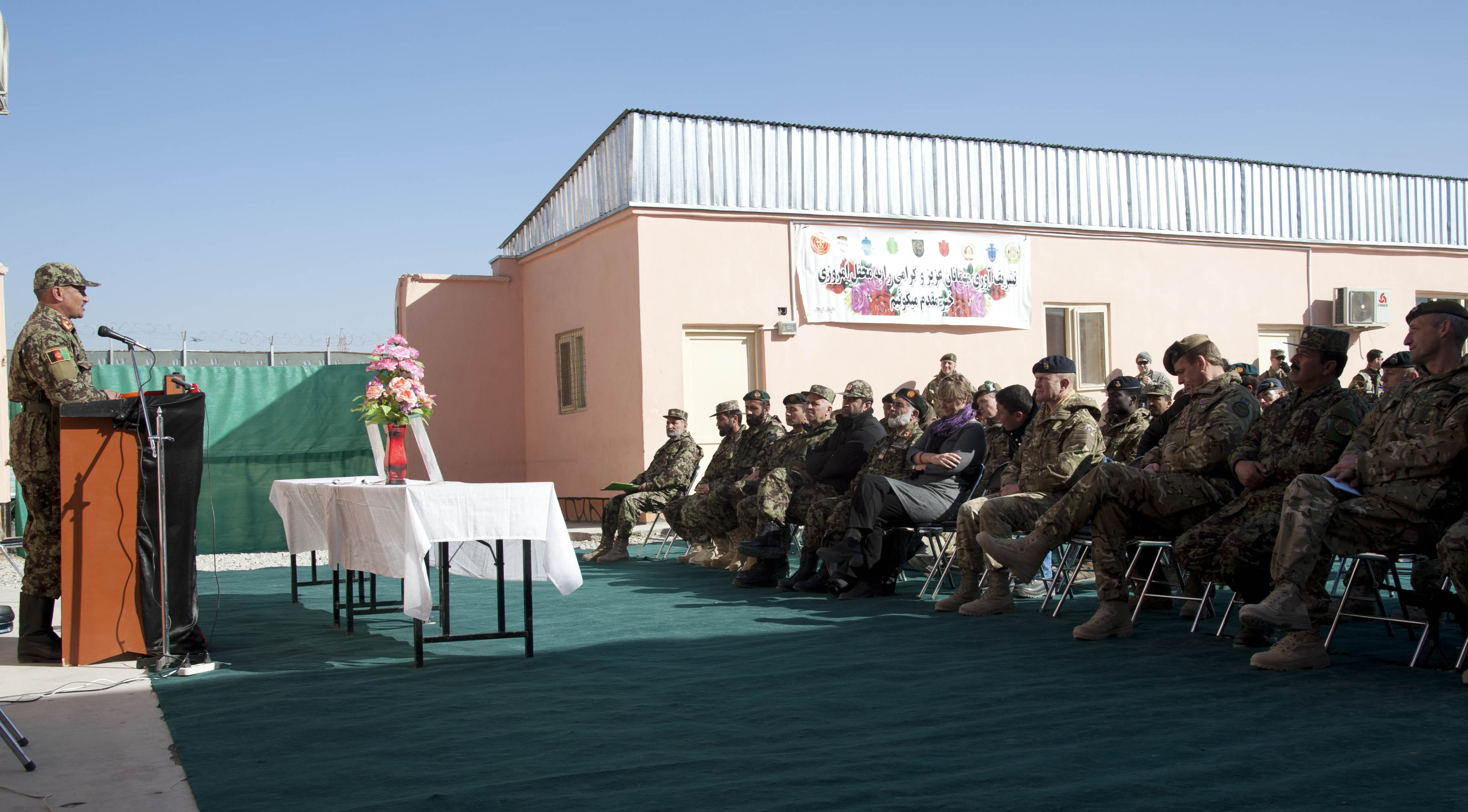

Site information
- Type: Military army base
- Owner: Department of National Defence
- Operator: Canadian Army; 2003 – 2005

Location
- Location in Afghanistan
- Coordinates: 34°27′33.4″N 69°07′00.1″E

Site history
- Built: 2003
- Built by: Canadian Army
- In use: 2003 – 2005

Camp Julien was the main base for the Canadian contingent of the International Security Assistance Force (ISAF) in Kabul, Afghanistan.

The camp was named after Lance Corporal George Patrick Julien, a Canadian Army soldier who was awarded the Military Medal as a Private, for his actions at Hill 187 in Korea in May 1953. LCpl Julien was a member of 3rd Battalion, The Royal Canadian Regiment, which was the first unit to occupy Camp Julien.

At its height the camp housed 2,000 Canadian soldiers and over 400 civilian workers, approximately half of whom were Nepalese. The Nepalese workers were responsible for manual labour, including cooking and cleaning. The Canadian workers supervised, and completed tasks in office, warehouse, laundry, maintenance, utilities, cleaning service and food preparation settings. Other workers hailed from South Africa, the United States, the United Kingdom and India. A limited number of local Afghan citizens were employed in the laundry. This was the Canadian military's first large-scale camp which was largely run by a third-party independent contractor, in this case SNC Lavalin PAE.

The camp had a good reputation with coalition troops for its amenities which included water and sewage treatment plants and a water bottling facility.

The site closed in November 2005 and was handed over to the Government of Afghanistan.

In April 2007, Camp Julien reopened and was designated a new home for the COIN (Counterinsurgency) Academy. It was a multinational organization that ran a week-long course designed to teach military leaders the basics of counterinsurgency operations.
