= 2 Area Support Group Signal Squadron =

- Active: 1998–2013
- Country: Canada
- Branch: Communications and Electronics Branch
- Type: Communications
- Role: To deliver secure and non-secure communication and information systems across LFCA.
- Size: Approximately 60 soldiers (50 in regular force, 10 reserve force) and 100 civilian employees.
- Part of: 2 ASG
- Locations: Sqn HQ – CFB Petawawa; A Tp – CFB Petawawa; B Tp – CFB Kingston; C Tp – ASU Toronto; D Tp – ASU London; Det Ottawa – Ottawa; Det Nor On – Sault Ste. Marie
- Motto(s): Fidelus Cursor (Faithful Runner)
- Colors: French grey and dark blue
- March: The Mercury March

2 Area Support Group Signal Squadron (2 ASG Sig Sqn) was a Regular Force Army unit within the Canadian Forces. The squadron was responsible for delivering secure and non-secure communication and information systems across Land Force Central Area (LFCA). The squadron's parent formation was 2 Area Support Group (2 ASG). Although an Army unit, for service delivery the squadron aligned itself to an ITIL framework for business processes and a common lexicon with industry partners.

2 ASG Signal Squadron was headquartered at Canadian Forces Base (CFB) Petawawa with platoon-sized troops in Petawawa, Kingston, Toronto, London and section-sized detachments in Ottawa, Sault Ste Marie, and North Bay. The majority of soldiers within the squadron came from the Communications and Electronics Branch. In 2013, 2 ASG Sig Sqn was renamed 4th Canadian Division Support Group Signal Squadron.

== History ==
2 ASG Sig Sqn, in various forms, has been located at CFB Petawawa since a school of signals was established in 1912. In 1960, Camp Petawawa Signal Squadron was formed from the amalgamation of three units: 2 Static Signal Troop, Camp Petawawa Signal Troop, and Increment D Troop. On 1 November 1966, Camp Petawawa Signal Squadron became 702 Communication Squadron (702 Comm Sqn) with the motto Nunquam Non Paratus (Never Unready).

Over the years the squadron has changed hands between Army Signals, Communication Command, Director Information Services Organization and back to the Army. In 1998, 702 Communications Squadron became part of 2 ASG within Land Force Central Area (LFCA) and renamed to 2 Area Support Group Signal Squadron. Base Information Technology Support Units (BITSUs) at Ottawa, Kingston, Toronto, London, North Bay and Sault Ste. Marie were amalgamated with the squadron to create a single unit within LFCA, which would provide consolidated information systems support to all Army units in Ontario. In 2013, 2 ASG Sig Sqn was renamed 4th Canadian Division Support Group Signal Squadron with a Government of Canada move to restore historical features of the Canadian Army.

== Commanding officers ==
- Lieutenant-Colonel Wayne Buck, CD, MSM (nato), 1998–2000
- Lieutenant-Colonel Paul Roy, CD, 2000–2002
- Major Luc Angiolini, CD, 2002–2004
- Major Ray Charlebois, CD, 2004–2006
- Major James Greengrass, CD, 2006–2008
- Major James Bronson, CD, 2008–2009
- Major Alex MacPherson, CD, 2009–2011
- Major Jason Smith, CD, 2011–2013

== Squadron Sergeants Major ==
- Master Warrant Officer Theresa Charlton, CD, 2001–2005
- Master Warrant Officer Don MacIsaac, CD, 2005–2007
- Master Warrant Officer Rob Sheldrick, CD, 2007–2008
- Master Warrant Officer Allan Montgomery, CD, 2008–2010
- Master Warrant Officer Stephen McNabb, MMM, CD, 2010–2011
- Master Warrant Officer Al Trask, CD, 2011–2013

== Armoury ==
Site	Date(s)	Designated	Location	Description	Image
Denison Armoury 1 Yukon Lane		Canada's Register of Historic Places	Toronto, Ontario	Large centrally located building houses 32 Canadian Brigade Group Headquarters; The Governor General's Horse Guards; 2 Intelligence Company; 32 Combat Engineer Regiment; 32 Service Battalion; 2 Military Police Regiment (Canada) and one of its sub-units, 32 Military Police Platoon; 4th Canadian Division Support Group Signal Squadron (formerly 2 Area Support Group Signal Squadron) Charlie Troop; 4th Canadian Division Support Group Detachment Toronto.	

== See also ==
- List of armouries in Canada
- Military history of Canada
- History of the Canadian Army
- Canadian Forces
- 2 CMBG Headquarters & Signal Squadron
