= Military training area =

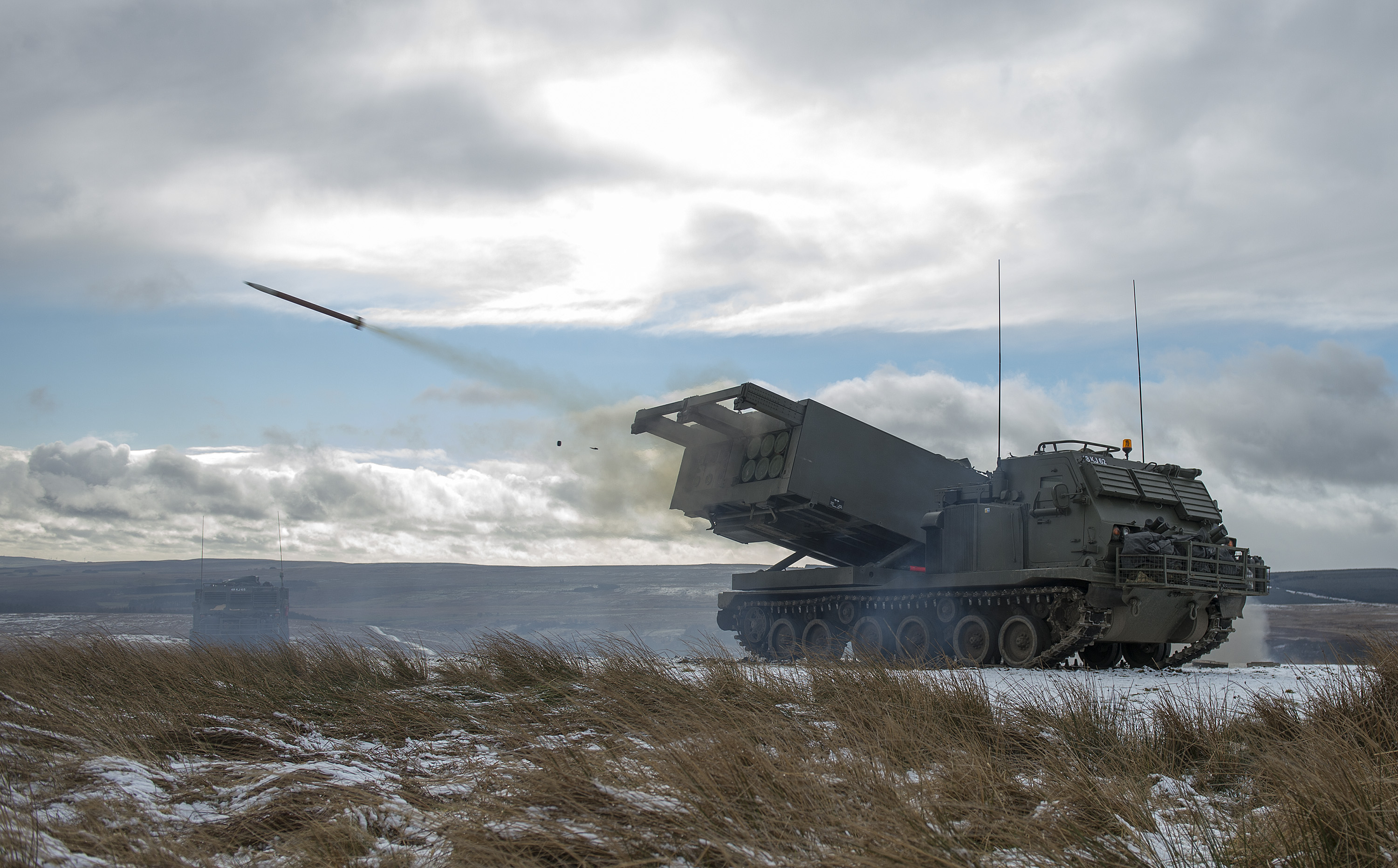
MLRS firing a live missile at Otterburn Training Area

A military training area, training area (Australia, Ireland, and the United Kingdom) or training centre (Canada) is land set aside specifically to enable military forces to train and exercise for combat. Training areas are usually out of bounds to the general public, but some have limited access when not in use. As well as their military function, they often serve as important wildlife refuges. They are distinct from proving grounds which are designed for purposes such as testing weaponry or equipment.

== Description ==
Military training areas are important because they enable troops to train more realistically and in greater numbers over a wide area without unduly inconveniencing the public or putting others at risk. They are particularly important for all arms training where the different elements of armed forces come together to cooperate and coordinate their fire and movement. Training areas often incorporate a variety of terrain types, including forests, heathland, waterbodies and farmland, as well as urban training facilities such as the 'Afghan village' at Thetford on Stanford Training Area. Such training areas are run by the military and are normally out-of-bounds to the public who may sometimes be allowed access during weekends or holidays. (Note: For example, there is guidance on public access to UK training areas at the HM Government website.) Training areas may incorporate shooting ranges or designated areas where live firing is permitted.

== Wildlife ==
Military training areas are often important wildlife refuges and can make a "significant contribution to conservation... if properly managed." This is because they comprise large tracts of countryside with restricted access and are free from development, cultivation or other exploitative activities. They typically divide into areas that are regularly disturbed by vehicle traffic or weapons such as bombs and missiles and areas that are relatively undisturbed.

Military training areas are home to some of our most endangered species of animals and plants "precisely because they are used by the military." In the US, 21% of endangered species live on DoD land which forms only 3% of the country. A Polish study showed that the training was not significantly detrimental to biodiversity. The major factor in this was the lack of human intervention for lengthy periods of time.

In Germany, it has been found that wolves moving into new areas will invariably settle first in military training areas before spreading out. This may be because there is less poaching and the hunting areas tend to be far larger than those on private land, so they are less easy to find.

== Training areas by country ==
=== Europe ===
==== Austria ====
Austria has had important training areas since the 18th century. From 1938 the German Wehrmacht established new training areas, the largest being Döllersheim (now Allentsteig) Training Area in the Waldviertel. Other areas in use today include:

- Allentsteig, Lower Austria (157 km^{2}), largest training area in Austria
- Bruckneudorf, Lower Austria
- Hochfilzen, Tyrol
- Lizum-Walchen, Tyrol (50 km^{2})

==== Bulgaria ====
- Novo Selo Range (144 km^{2}), has designated areas and sectors for tank shooting, and nuclear, biological, and chemical defense and reconnaissance training.

==== Czech Republic ====
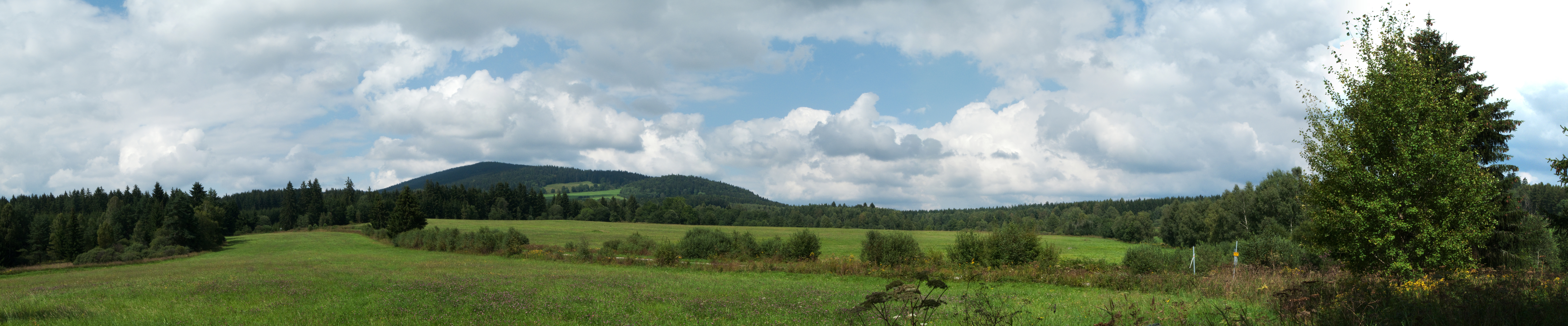
Boletice Military Training Area

There are four military training areas (MTAs) in the Czech Republic with the total area of 1,296 km^{2}: Boletice, Březina, Hradiště and Libavá. They are run by "Military Regions" and have been used since 1994 for joint exercises and training between the Czech armed forces and its allies. This was initially carried out as part of Partnership for Peace Programme and subsequently with NATO. In addition, since 2001, the armed forces of Austria, Belgium, France, Hungary, the Netherlands and the US have conducted national exercises on Czech MTAs.

==== Denmark ====
- Borris Skydeterræn (47 km^{2})

==== Finland ====
- Rovajärvi training area near Rovaniemi in Lapland is the largest of its kind in Northern Europe (1110 km^{2}).
- The Artillery Brigade in Niinisalo, currently housing the Finnish ordnance R&D centre (established 1921)

==== Germany ====
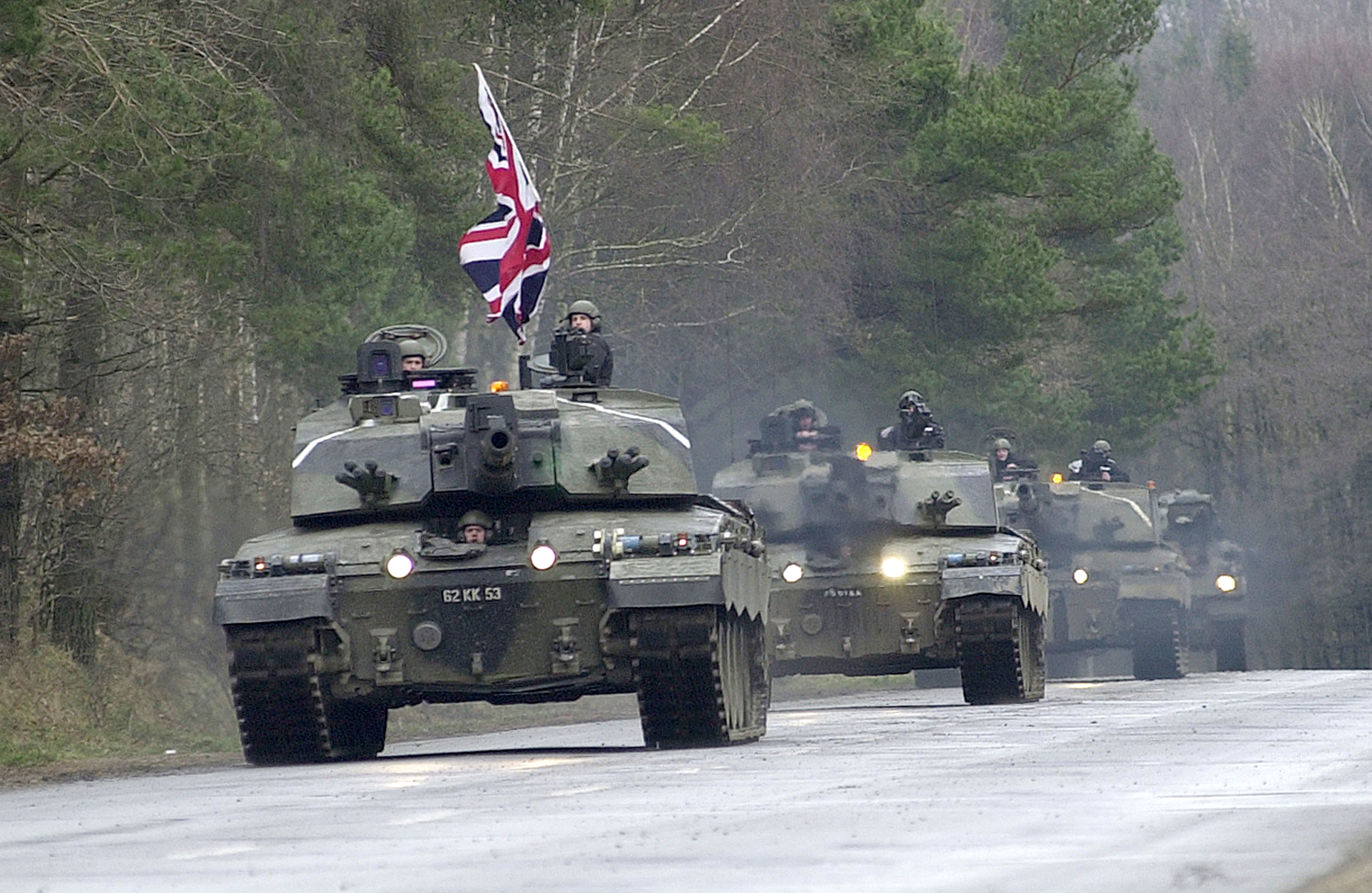
British Challenger 2 main battle tanks at Bergen-Hohne TA

- Bergen-Hohne Training Area, Lower Saxony (284 km^{2}), NATO facility, largest training area in Germany
- Grafenwöhr, Bavaria (229 km^{2}) a US facility
- Hammelburg, Bavaria (40 km^{2}), featuring a complete artificial village for German Army training
- Hohenfels, Bavaria (160 km^{2})
- Heuberg Training Area, Baden-Württemberg
- Munster Training Area, Lower Saxony
- Sennelager Training Area, North Rhine-Westphalia, managed by the British Army
- Vogelsang Training Area, in the Eifel, NRW
- Wildflecken Training Area in Bavaria

==== Ireland ====
- Glen of Imaal (27 km^{2}), an Irish Army artillery, live fire, and tactical training area

==== Italy ====
- Salto di Quirra (120 km^{2}), an Italian interforce training area on Sardinia

==== Poland ====
- Drawsko Training Ground (340 km^{2}), belonging to the Polish Army and Air Force since 1946 and also used by NATO since 1996. This facility is internationally known as DPTA (Drawsko Pomorskie Training Area). It is also an important archaeological excavation site.
- Ośrodek Szkolenia Poligonowego Wojsk Lądowych Żagań (about 34,000 ha) in Żagań County and Bolesławiec County, belonging to the Polish Land Forces and also used by NATO
- Poligon Bierdusko (about 7,300 ha) in Biedrusko near Poznań, mainly used for tank and artillery training.

==== Portugal ====
- Alcochete (75 km^{2}), an artillery and air bombing range. Established in 1904, it was managed by the Portuguese Army until 1993 and since then is managed by the Portuguese Air Force. It is the largest closed military facility in Europe. In 2008, it was chosen to be the site of the future New Lisbon International Airport.
- Santa Margarida (67 km^{2}), a mainly tank and mechanized infantry training camp. It includes a 35 km^{2} area of barracks, which houses the Mechanized Brigade of the Portuguese Army.

==== Romania ====
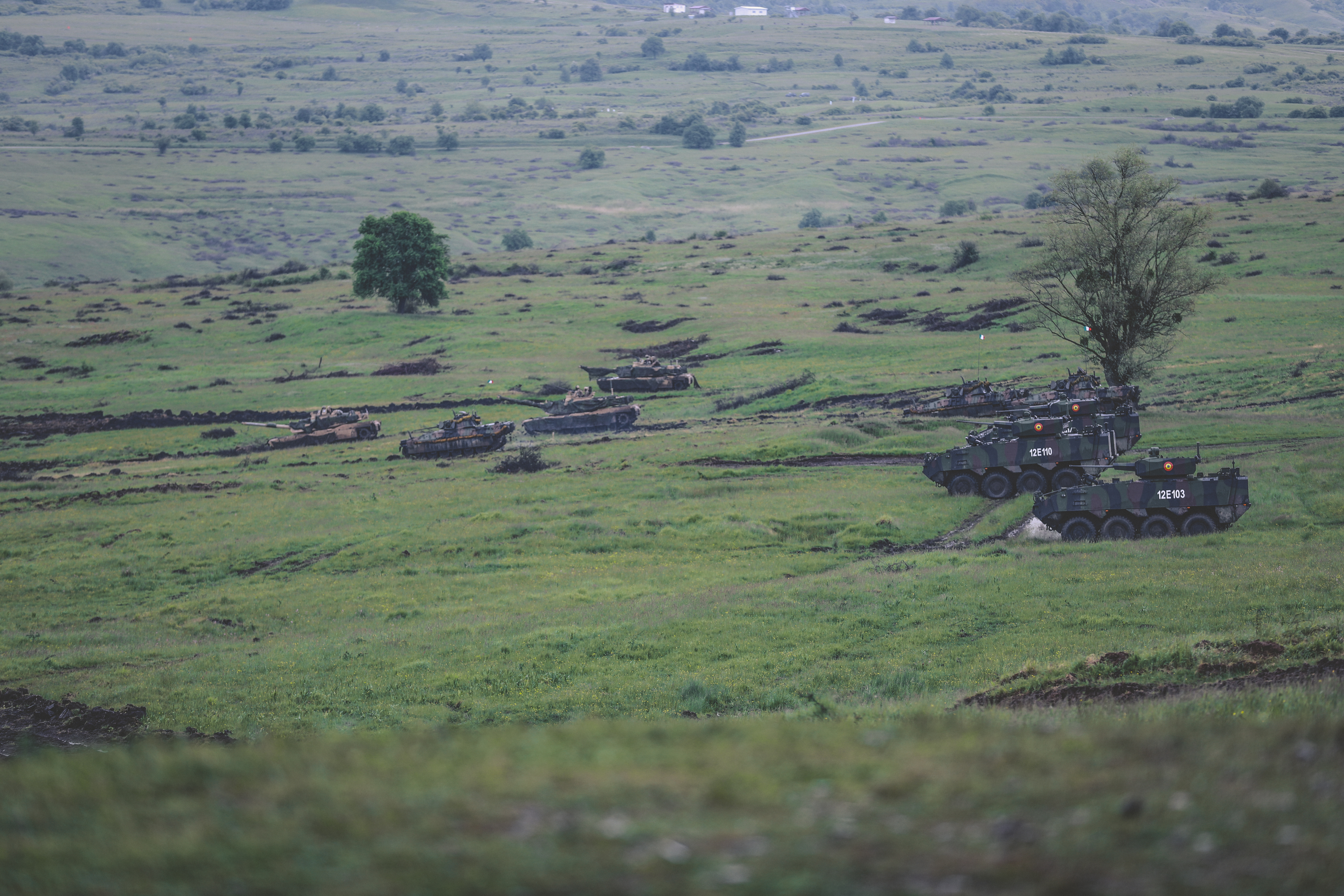
American, Italian and Romanian armored vehicles and tanks at Cincu

- Babadag Training Area (27 km^{2}), used for infantry and tanks training at company level as well as artillery subunits.
- Capu Midia Training Range, used for a variety of exercises as well as for the reception and testing of various weapon systems.
- Cincu Training Center (104 km^{2}), used for training military personnel and units up to brigade level. Established in 1919, it is also the location of the NATO Multinational Battlegroup Romania.
- Smârdan Training Area (about 100 km^{2}), training area for infantry fighting vehicles and tanks as well as air bombing exercises.

==== Spain ====
- Chinchilla, Albacete (CENAD Chinchilla), 232 km^{2}
- San Gregorio, Zaragoza (CENAD San Gregorio), 340 km^{2}

==== Sweden ====
- Villingsberg Training Area (100 km^{2})
- Revingehed (43 km^{2})

==== United Kingdom ====
The UK has six regional training areas and twenty two overseas training areas.

- Bronaber Training Area, Wales
- Salisbury Plain Training Area (380 km^{2})
- Stanford Training Area (STANTA), Norfolk (120 km^{2}), established 1942, includes an "Afghan" village
- Otterburn Training Area, Northumberland (242 km^{2})

=== North America ===
==== Canada ====
- CFB Suffield, Alberta (2690 km^{2}), training base for the Canadian Forces and British Army
- Canadian Forces Base Wainwright, Alberta (609 km^{2}), home of the Land Force Western Area Training Centre (LFWATC) and Canadian Manoeuvre Training Centre (CMTC)
- CFB Shilo, Manitoba (400 km^{2}), home station of the Royal Regiment of Canadian Artillery
- Land Force Central Area Training Centre Meaford, Ontario (68 km^{2}), training centre for the 4th Canadian Division
- Garrison Petawawa, Ontario (307 km^{2}), home of 2 CMBG and 4th CDSG
- CFB Valcartier, Quebec (28 km^{2}), home of 5 CMBG
- CFB Gagetown, New Brunswick (1100 km^{2}), the primary Eastern Canada training area
- Land Force Atlantic Area Training Centre Aldershot, Nova Scotia (11.4 km^{2})

=== Oceania ===
==== Australia ====
- Bindoon Military Training Area, Bindoon, Western Australia
- Bradshaw Field Training Area – Timber Creek, Northern Territory
- Buckland Military Training Area, near Hobart, Tasmania
- Cowley Beach Training Area - Cowley Beach, Queensland
- Lancelin Training Area, Lancelin, Western Australia
- Kangaroo Flats Training Area – Berry Springs, Northern Territory
- Mount Bundey Training Area - Mount Bundey, Northern Territory
- Murray Bridge Training Area, South Australia
- Shoalwater Bay Military Training Area, Shoalwater Bay, Queensland (4,545 km^{2})

== Literature ==
- Dudley, Marianna (2012). An Environmental History of the UK Defence Estate, 1945 to the Present. Bloomsbury.
