= Petawawa (disambiguation) =

Petawawa is a town located in the eastern portion of Southern Ontario.

Petawawa may also refer to:

- Petawawa Heliport, located 3.5 nautical miles northwest of Petawawa, Ontario Canada
- Petawawa River, a river in the Saint Lawrence River drainage basin in Nipissing District and Renfrew County in eastern and northeastern Ontario, Canada.
- Garrison Petawawa, located in Petawawa, Ontario, it is operated as an army base by the Canadian Army
