= Royal Canadian Corps of Signals =

Army component of the Canadian Armed Forces' Communications and Electronics Branch

- Corps des transmissions royal du Canada (French)
- Active: 1903–1968; 2013–present
- Country: Canada
- Branch: Canadian Army
- Type: Combat support
- Role: Military communications
- Size: Administrative corps
- Part of: Communications and Electronics Branch
- Garrison/HQ: Vimy Barracks, CFB Kingston, Ontario
- Nickname: "Jimmies" "Siggies" “Sigs Pigs”
- Mottos: Velox versutus vigilans (Latin for 'swift, accurate, watchful')
- Colors: Scarlet with black facings (mess dress)
- March: "Begone, Dull Care" (until 1968, 2014–present)
- Anniversaries: 24 October (corps birthday)

Commanders
- Current commander: Colonel Walter Jull
- Colonel-in-Chief: Anne, Princess Royal
- Notable commanders: Major Wallace Bruce Matthews Carruthers

Insignia
- Headdress: Dark blue beret

The Royal Canadian Corps of Signals (RCCS or RC Sigs; French: Corps des transmissions royal du Canada, CTRC) is a component within the Canadian Armed Forces' Communications and Electronics Branch, consisting of all members of that personnel branch who wear army uniform. Prior to 1968 it was a combat support corps of the Canadian Army. The Royal Canadian Corps of Signals was re-instituted in 2013. It provides communication support and information systems for the Canadian Army.

Signallers receive their training at CFB Kingston, Ontario, at the Canadian Forces School of Communication and Electronics (CFSCE). Upon completion of their trade's training, signallers are posted to one of three mechanized brigade groups in Canada, or the Canadian Forces Joint Signal Regiment at CFB Kingston. There are detachments of signallers at bases around Canada and other DND facilities.

In the Second World War era, the corps badge consisted of a circle, with a Tudor Crown on top with the text Royal Canadian Corps of Signals around the edge. At the centre of the circle is the Roman god Mercury. At the bottom is a ribbon with the text velox, versutus, vigilans and eight maple leaves.

== History ==
Major Wallace Bruce Matthews Carruthers established a militia (Non-Permanent Active Militia) component of signallers under the designation Signalling Corps on 24 October 1903, making it the first independent signal corps in the British Empire. It was redesignated The Canadian Signal Corps on 4 June 1913. On 1 April 1919 as part of the restructuring based on experiences during the Great War, a regular (Permanent Active Militia) component was established as the Canadian Signalling Instructional Staff. This was redesignated The Canadian Permanent Signal Corps on 15 December 1920. Shortly thereafter, on 15 June 1921, King George V, the Canadian monarch, bestowed on the permanent force portion of the organization the title The Royal Canadian Corps of Signals. Meanwhile, on 1 August 1921, the militia component was re-titled Canadian Corps of Signals; redesignated Royal Canadian Corps of Signals on 29 April 1936 (as part of the larger military restructuring that year). From the outset of the Second World War and before Canada's participation in 1939 members of the RCCS were active setting up radio equipment and signalling infrastructure at Camp X near Oshawa on Lake Ontario. Many signallers became involved in the clandestine work of Pat Bayly and Sir William Stephenson. Finally, the RCCS was aligned in nomenclature with the regular component as The Royal Canadian Corps of Signals on 22 March 1948, after the conclusion of the Second World War.

=== Korean War ===
In June 1950 North Korea invaded South Korea, initiating a conflict that became the Korean War. A United Nations-led coalition was formed with 16 countries providing troops. Canada was one of the countries to intercede in the conflict. Over 26,700 Canadian troops served as part of the British Commonwealth Forces Korea. The RCCS was disbursed among the Canadian regiments as well as some American units and contributed to the overall success of the UN mission.

Signallers served the war effort with distinction in multiple battles, one of which was the Battle of Kapyong. Princess Patricia's Canadian Light Infantry (PPCLI), with their attached signallers, held their position against a much larger enemy force during the first North Korean spring offensive. With such efforts by the PPCLI and signallers, The UN mission stopped North Korean aggression and subsequently provided deterrence that lead to an armistice, signed on 27 July 1953. This armistice is still in effect.

=== Post-War ===
During the 50s and 60s, the RCCS operated Emergency Government Headquarters, nicknamed "Diefenbunkers", that served to ensure the continuity of government at the height of the Cold War. The RCCS operated the Ennadai Lake Radio Station (VEJ) from the summer of 1949 until 18 September 1954 when it was turned over to the Department of Transportation. When the Canadian Army, Royal Canadian Air Force and Royal Canadian Navy were unified in 1968 to form the Canadian Forces, the RCCS was amalgamated into the Canadian Forces' Communications and Electronics Branch. On 19 April 2013, Minister of National Defence, Peter MacKay, announced that the designation of "Royal Canadian Corps of Signals" would be restored for the army component within the Communications and Electronics Branch.

== Structure ==
- Canadian Forces School of Communications and Electronics
- Canadian Forces Joint Signal Regiment
- 1 Signal Regiment
- 2 Canadian Mechanized Brigade Group Headquarters and Signal Squadron
- 5 Canadian Mechanized Brigade Group Headquarters and Signal Squadron
- 31 Signal Regiment
- 32 Signal Regiment
- 33 Signal Regiment
- 34 Signal Regiment
- 35 Signal Regiment
- 36 Signal Regiment
- 37 Signal Regiment
- 38 Signal Regiment
- 39 Signal Regiment
- 41 Signal Regiment
- 21 Electronic Warfare Regiment
  - Regimental Headquarters (Regular)
  - 211 Electronic Warfare Squadron (Regular)
  - 212 Electronic Warfare Squadron (Regular)
  - 214 Electronic Warfare Squadron (Reserve)
  - 215 Electronic Warfare Squadron (Regular)
  - 218 Combat Service Support Squadron (Regular)

== Colonels-in-Chief ==
- Mary, Princess Royal and Countess of Harewood (1940–1965)
- Anne, Princess Royal (1987–present)

== Notable former members ==
- William Arthur Steel – An officer with the RCCS during World War I and radio pioneer.
- Jack Kane – He was Anglo-Canadian arranger, conductor and clarinetist who served with the trumpet band from 1942 to 1945.
- James Gayfer – Served with the RCCS trumpet band in Europe. He was also the Director of the Band of The Canadian Guards in the 1950s and early 60s.
- William Carlton Woods

== See also ==
- List of Canadian organizations with royal prefix
- Communications Security Establishment
- Band of the Royal Canadian Corps of Signals
- Royal Corps of Signals
- Royal Australian Corps of Signals
- Royal New Zealand Corps of Signals
- South African Army Signal Formation
- Indian Army Corps of Signals
- Pakistan Army Corps of Signals
