= 2nd Combat Engineer Regiment =

2nd Combat Engineer Regiment may refer to:

- 2nd Combat Engineer Regiment (Australia), a regiment of the Royal Australian Engineers.
- 2 Combat Engineer Regiment (Canada), a regiment of the Canadian Military Engineers.

== See also ==
- 2nd Alpine Engineer Regiment, a regiment of the Italian Army.
- 2nd Combat Engineer Battalion, a battalion of the United States Marine Corps.
- 2nd Foreign Engineer Regiment, a regiment of the French Foreign Legion.
