= Boletice Military Training Area =

Military training area in the Czech Republic

Boletice
- Military training area
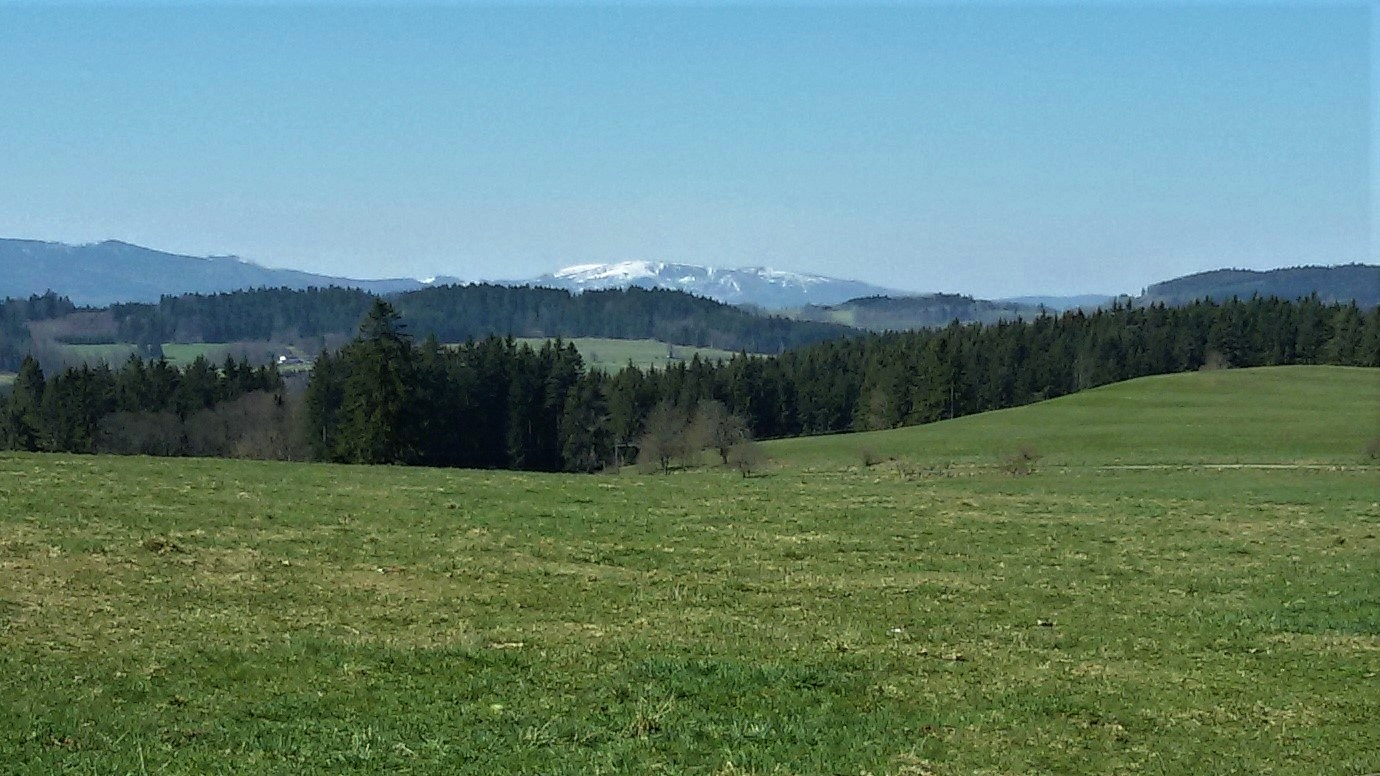
- Knížecí stolec, the highest point of Boletice

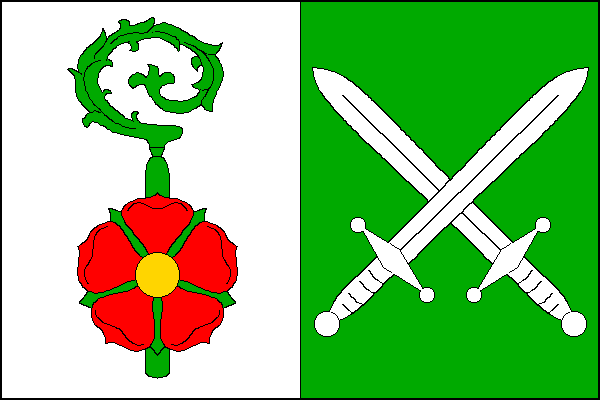
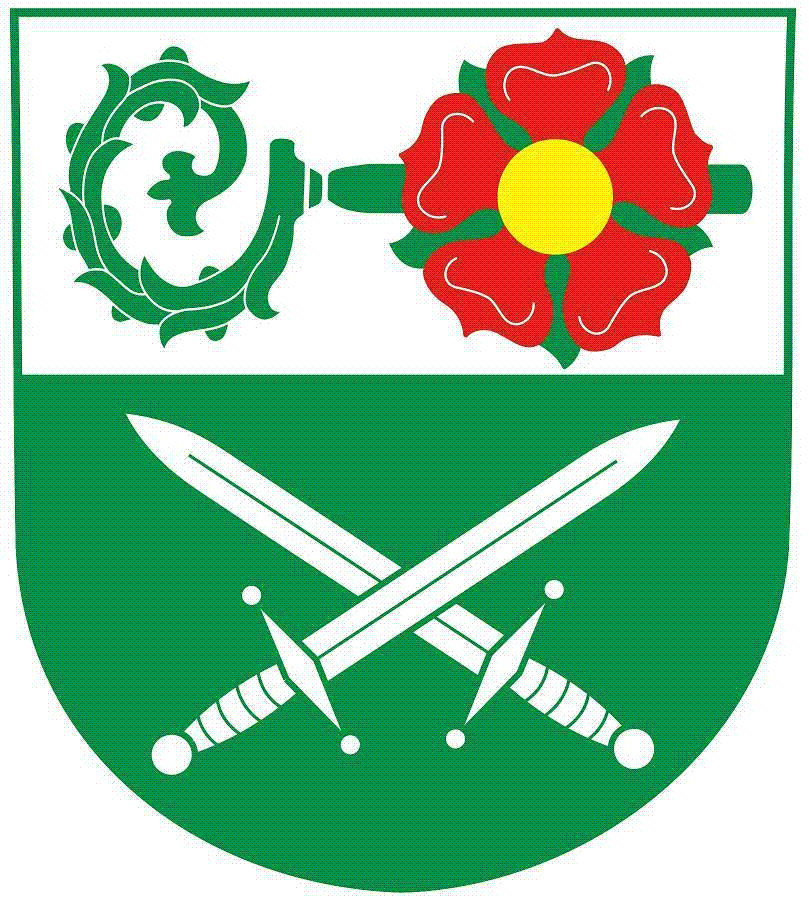
- Flag Coat of arms

- Location in the Czech Republic
- Coordinates: 48°49′30″N 14°13′2″E
- Country: Czech Republic
- Region: South Bohemian
- District: Český Krumlov
- First mentioned: 1263

Area
  - Total: 165.44 km^{2} (63.88 sq mi)
- Elevation: 620 m (2,030 ft)

Population (2026-01-01)
  - Total: 0
- Time zone: UTC+1 (CET)
  - Summer (DST): UTC+2 (CEST)
- Postal code: 382 08
- Website: www.vojujezd-boletice.cz

Boletice Military Training Area (Czech: Vojenský újezd Boletice) is a military training area in Český Krumlov District in the South Bohemian Region of the Czech Republic. Half of the military area is located in the Bohemian Forest range.

== Etymology ==
The military training area was named after the village of Boletice. The name Boletice was derived from the personal name Bolata, meaning "the village of Bolata's people".

== Geography ==
Boletice Military Training Area is located about 9 kilometres (6 mi) west of Český Krumlov and 25 km (16 mi) southwest of České Budějovice. It lies on the border with Austria. The western part of the military area lies in the Bohemian Forest and most of it belongs to the Šumava Protected Landscape Area. The eastern part lies in the Bohemian Forest Foothills. The highest point is the mountain Knížecí stolec at 1,236 m (4,055 ft) above sea level. The lowest point is the riverbed on the stream Boletický potok at 542 m (1,778 ft). The Blanice River originates in the western part of the military training area.

== History ==
Boletice Military Training Area was established on 19 May 1947 as the successor of the Boletice Military Camp. On 1 January 2016, its area was reduced by a quarter. Two new municipalities were established: Polná na Šumavě (including the settlements of Květušín, Olšina and Otice) and Křišťanov. In addition, the village of Boletice was joined to Kájov, and Třebovice was joined to Ktiš. Since then, no permanent residents have lived here.

Except for the seven settlements that separated from the military area in 2016, the following 40 villages and hamlets were located in its territory before the establishment of the military area: Arnoštov, Beníkovice, Bezděkov, Bílovice, Bláto, Bozdova Lhota, Břevniště, Chlumany, Dolní Brzotice, Hořičky, Horní Brzotice, Hvozd, Jablonec, Javoří, Květná, Lomek, Loutka, Míšňany, Mladoňov, Nová Víska, Nový Špičák, Ondřejov, Osí, Polečnice, Podvoří, Pražačka, Račín, Sádlno, Šavlova Lhota, Starý Špičák, Střemily, Strouhy, Uhlíkov, Veselí, Vitěšovice, Vítěšovičtí Uhlíři, Vlčí Jámy, Vražice, Zadní Bor and Zlatá.

== Demographics ==
Historical population

Year	Pop.	±%
1869	5,309	—
1880	5,803	+9.3%
1890	5,241	−9.7%
1900	5,008	−4.4%
1910	5,010	+0.0%

Year	Pop.	±%
1921	5,101	+1.8%
1930	5,076	−0.5%
1950	210	−95.9%
1961	329	+56.7%
1970	271	−17.6%

Year	Pop.	±%
1980	226	−16.6%
1991	235	+4.0%
2001	0	−100.0%
2011	11	—
2021	0	−100.0%

Source: Censuses

== Access ==
According to the laws of the Czech Republic, access to the entire area without permission is prohibited.
