= Wallace Bruce Matthews Carruthers =

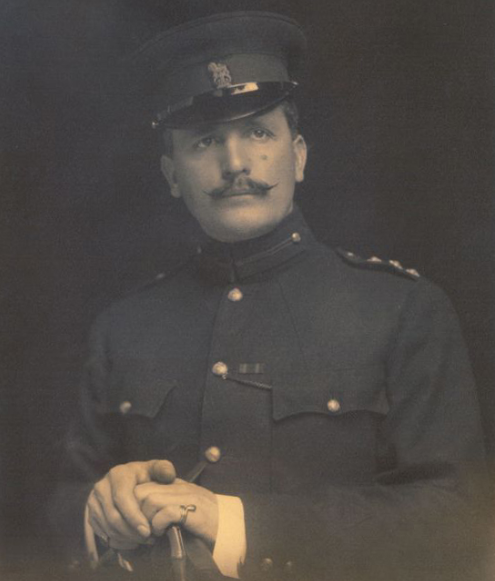
- Born: February 13, 1863; Kingston, Ontario, Canada West
- Died: October 21, 1910 (aged 47)
- Burial place: Cataraqui Cemetery
- Military career
- Allegiance: Canada
- Branch: Canadian Militia
- Service years: 1883–1910
- Rank: Major
- Nickname: Bruce
- Units: 21st Hussars; 14th Battalion, The Princess of Wales’ Own Rifles; 2nd (Special Service) Battalion; 2nd Canadian Mounted Rifles
- Commands: Assistant Adjutant General for Signalling
- Conflicts: Second Boer War: Battle of Paardeberg; Battle of Hart's River (WIA)
- Awards: Queen's South Africa Medal

Major Wallace Bruce Matthews Carruthers (February 13, 1863 – October 21, 1910) was an officer of the Canadian Militia (now the Canadian Army) and the founder of the Royal Canadian Corps of Signals.

== Education ==
Born in Kingston, Canada West, Bruce Carruthers graduated from the Royal Military College of Canada (College Number 82) in 1883.

== Service ==
Upon graduation from RMC he served in the British Army's 21st Hussars for four years before returning to Canada. He then served in the 14th Battalion, The Princess of Wales’ Own Rifles until 1899 when he resigned his commission in order to take part in the South African War. He served as a Sergeant in the 2nd (Special Service) Battalion of The Royal Canadian Regiment and took part in the Battle of Paardeberg. Carruthers returned to South Africa for further service as a Lieutenant in the 2nd Regiment, Canadian Mounted Rifles. On March 31, 1902, he fought at the Battle of Hart's River where he was leading some 21 men of 3rd and 4th Troops 'E' Squadron to screen the main body of Cookson's Column as they prepared a defensive position. Faced with several hundred charging Boers and no cover, Lieutenant Carruthers dismounted his men to meet the attack. They fought until out of ammunition by which time 17 had been killed or wounded, including Carruthers. As a result of his service he was awarded the Queen's South Africa Medal with five clasps: Paardeberg, Driefontein, Johannesburg, Cape Colony, SA 1902.

Based on his experiences in South Africa and his recognition of the importance of communications he lobbied for the establishment of a signal corps upon his return to Canada. He was successful and on October 24, 1903, the first independently organized signal corps in the British Empire was formed. Carruthers was appointed Inspector of Signalling of the young Corps and, when reorganization in 1906, was appointed the Assistant Adjutant-General for Signalling.

== Royal Canadian Corps of Signals ==
Carruthers was the founder of the Canadian Signalling Corps, forerunner of the Royal Canadian Corps of Signals and the Communications and Electronics Branch. In the 1968 unification of the Canadian Armed Forces, functional similar components of the Royal Canadian Navy, Canadian Army and Royal Canadian Air Force were combined into the new Communications and Electronics Branch.

During the Boer War, Carruthers noted the importance of tactical signaling in a successful campaign. Observing the employment of heliographs, semaphore flags and lamps, he realized there was a need for a unit to provide proper training in the use of these systems. Upon his return to Canada in 1902, he wrote a paper on signaling for the Royal Military College Club and championed an establishment of a signaling Corps. In 1903, the formation of the Canadian Signal Corps was authorized by General Order 167. It was the first Signal Corps in the British Commonwealth and is the forerunner of the Royal Canadian Corps of Signals.

On 3 February 1903, now Major Carruthers was appointed as one of two Inspectors of Signaling. Setting up his headquarters in Kingston, Ontario, he was responsible to the Militia Council for the supervision of instruction and practice of signaling and the inspection of signalers and their equipment. In 1904, the first Provisional School of Signaling was established, with schools held in Kingston, Ottawa, Winnipeg, Montreal, Halifax, London, Quebec and Toronto over the next 2 years. Training began in earnest in 1905 in summer militia instructional camps or in provisional schools set up in those eight cities. 546 Officers and men from the Rural Corps were trained in semaphore at the summer camps and 68 of those had qualified as signalers over the next few years.

== Death ==
Major Carruthers died at the age of 47 on October 21, 1910, from tuberculosis contracted during his service in South Africa. He was given a huge military funeral at Chalmers Presbyterian Church and was buried in the Cataraqui Cemetery.
