= 2 Canadian Mechanized Brigade Group Headquarters and Signal Squadron =

2 Signal Regiment
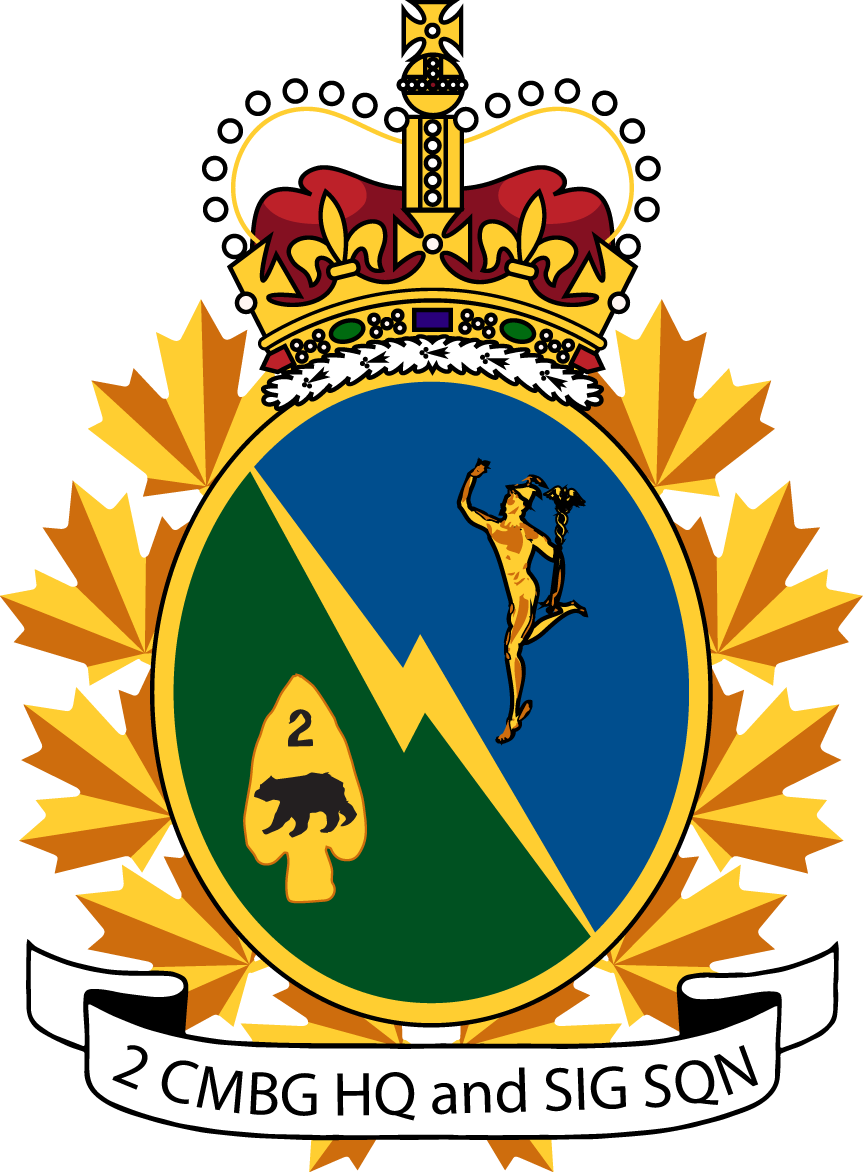
- Active: 1995 - Present
- Country: Canada
- Branch: Communications and Electronics Branch
- Role: To empower Commander 2 CMBG and his staff by providing the communication services necessary to exercise command and control (C2) over the formation.
- Garrison/HQ: Garrison Petawawa
- Mottos: Velox, Versutus, Vigilans (Speed, Accuracy, Vigiliance)
- Colors: French grey and dark blue
- March: The Mercury March
- Mascot: Jimmy
- Anniversaries: 24 June 1995
- Engagements: War in Afghanistan (2001–2021); Operation ATHENA; Operation Medusa; Battle of Panjwaii

Commanders
- Commanding Officer: Lieutenant Colonel Justin Yoo
- Regimental Sergeant Major: Chief Warrant Officer Darryl Radbourne

2nd Signal Regiment is a Regular Force Army unit of the Canadian Forces garrisoned at Canadian Forces Base (CFB) Petawawa. The unit's parent formation is 2 Canadian Mechanized Brigade Group (2 CMBG).

== History ==
The Special Service Force Headquarters and Signal Squadron (SSF HQ & Sig Sqn) was renamed 2 Canadian Mechanized Brigade Group Headquarters and Signal Squadron on 1 June 1995, coincident with the name change of its parent formation. The squadron has provided personnel and equipment for many United Nations (UN) and North Atlantic Treaty Organization (NATO) missions, particularly Operation ALLIANCE (Former Yugoslavia) in 1996, Operation PRUDENCE (Central African Republic) in 1998 and Operation KINETIC (Kosovo) in 1999. The squadron has been involved with significant domestic operations including the Winnipeg flood in 1997, the ice storms in 1998, and the G8 Summit in Huntsville in 2010.

== Afghanistan ==
=== Kabul (2003-2005) ===
In July 2003, the squadron deployed to Afghanistan as part of Operation ATHENA Rotation 0 with a transfer of command authority on 17 July 2003. Under the command of Major Sean Sullivan, the unit provided integral communications support to the Canadian-led Kabul Multi-National Brigade (KMNB) led by Brigadier-General Peter Devlin, then Commander 2 CMBG. Although the core of the squadron was stationed within Camp Warehouse, the squadron had several outstations in allied locations throughout KMNB including Kabul International Airport and radio rebroadcast site on TV Tower Hill. They returned to CFB Petawawa in January 2004. The remainder of the time in Kabul prior to the move to Kandahar in 2005, 2 CMBG HQ & Sig Sqn only provided individual augmentation to the subsequent rotations.

=== Kandahar (2006-2011) ===
The G6 (Communications - General Staff System) Staff for the National Command Element of Rotation 2 (Task Force 3-06) was composed of the leadership of 2 CMBG HQ & Sig Sqn. This period saw some of the heaviest fighting during the Afghanistan Campaign including Operation Medusa. A complete squadron again deployed in May 2008 as Task Force Kandahar Signal Squadron under the leadership of Major (promoted Lieutenant-Colonel on tour) James Lambert as part of Task Force 5-08 (also called Rotation 5.5). When Brigadier-General Denis Thompson passed command of Task Force Kandahar to his successor, Brigadier-General Jonathan Vance on 19 February 2009, the squadron redeployed to Canada. The squadron deployed to Kandahar once again in August 2010 under Lieutenant-Colonel Chris McGuffin to support the last Task Force Headquarters (Task Force 5–10) under the combat-operations mandate. The squadron handed over to the Mission Transition Task Force in July 2011.

=== Fallen soldiers ===
During the Afghanistan campaign, the squadron lost two soldiers killed in action:

- Corporal Matthew McCully of Orangeville Ontario, was killed on 25 May 2007 when he stepped on a land mine while on foot patrol.
- Corporal Kenneth O'Quinn was killed on 3 March 2009 when the vehicle he was in detonated an improvised explosive device (IED).

== Commanding officers ==
- Major Mark Lilienthal, CD, 1995–1996
- Major Stephen Saulnier, CD, 1996–1998
- Major Donald Rousseau, CD, 1998–2000
- Major Maurice Audet, CD, 2000–2002
- Major Sean Sullivan, CD, 2002–2004
- Major Gilles Fortin, CD, 2004–2006
- Major James Lambert, CD, 2006–2008
- Major David Yarker, CD, 2008–2009
- Major Chris McGuffin, CD, 2009–2010
- Major Marie-Claude Arguin, CD, 2010–2012
- Major Neil Marshall, CD, 2012–2014
- Major Gavin Hunt, CD, 2014-2016
- Major Michael Janelle, CD, 2016–2018
- Major Patrick Perron, CD, 2018–2020
- Major Jean-Louis Boudreau, CD, 2020–2022
- Major Nicolas Gonthier, CD, 2022–2024
- Major Ben Clarke, CD, 2024-2026
- Lieutenant Colonel Justin Yoo, CD, 2026- Present

== Regimental Sergeants Major ==
- Chief Warrant Officer Gerry Cook, CD, 1995–1996
- Chief Warrant Officer Wilf Wityshyn, CD 1996-2000
- Chief Warrant Officer René Maillet, CD, 2000–2002
- Chief Warrant Officer Tony Fequet, CD, 2002–2005
- Chief Warrant Officer Kevin Symes, CD, 2005–2008
- Chief Warrant Officer Gerry Blais, CD, 2008–2010
- Chief Warrant Officer Gilles Ouellet, CD, 2010–2013
- Chief Warrant Officer Stephen McNabb, MMM, CD, 2013-2016
- Chief Warrant Officer Michelle Harris, CD, 2016–2019
- Chief Warrant Officer Scott Tanner, CD, 2019–2021
- Chief Warrant Officer Raymond Laplante, MMM, CD, 2021–2024
- Chief Warrant Officer Darryl Radbourne, CD, 2024-Present

== See also ==
- 2 Area Support Group Signal Squadron
