= Polná na Šumavě =

- Municipality
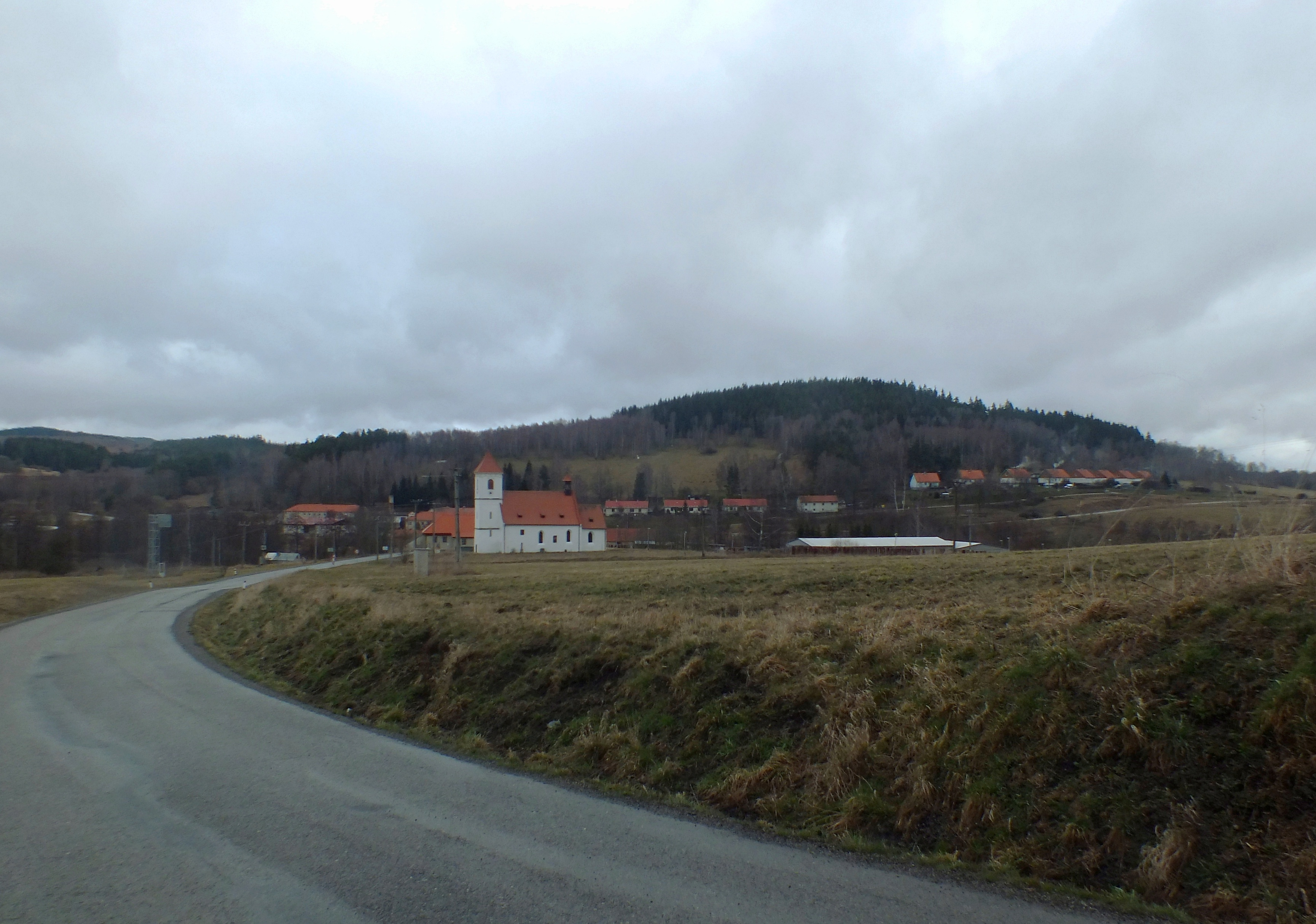
- View from the south

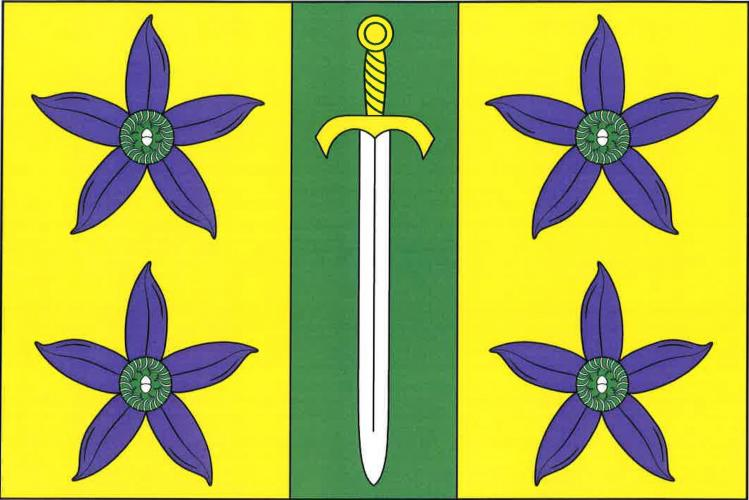
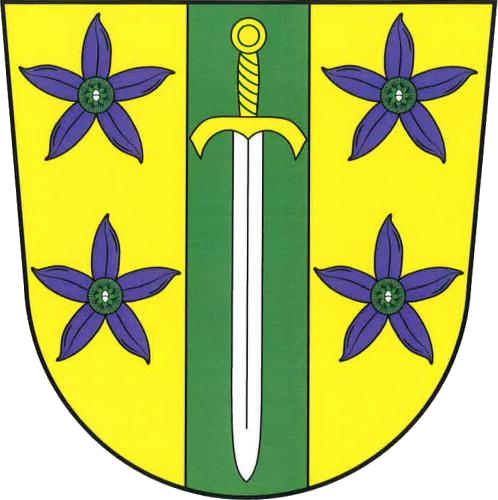
- Flag Coat of arms

- Location in the Czech Republic
- Coordinates: 48°47′57″N 14°8′49″E
- Country: Czech Republic
- Region: South Bohemian
- District: Český Krumlov
- First mentioned: 1259

Area
  - Total: 19.12 km^{2} (7.38 sq mi)
- Elevation: 750 m (2,460 ft)

Population (2026-01-01)
  - Total: 202
  - Density: 10.6/km^{2} (27.4/sq mi)
- Time zone: UTC+1 (CET)
  - Summer (DST): UTC+2 (CEST)
- Postal code: 382 29
- Website: www.polnanasumave.cz

Polná na Šumavě (German: Stein im Böhmerwald) is a municipality and village in Český Krumlov District in the South Bohemian Region of the Czech Republic. It has about 200 inhabitants.

== Administrative division ==
Polná na Šumavě consists of four municipal parts (in brackets population according to the 2021 census):

- Polná na Šumavě (52)
- Květušín (143)
- Olšina (0)
- Otice (3)

== History ==
The first written mention of Polná na Šumavě is from 1259. The municipality was recreated on 1 January 2016 by diminishing of the Boletice Military Training Area.

== Demographics ==
Historical population
Year	Pop.	±%
1869	719	—
1880	787	+9.5%
1890	736	−6.5%
1900	773	+5.0%
1910	836	+8.2%
1921	780	−6.7%
1930	830	+6.4%
1950	222	−73.3%
1961	0	−100.0%
1970	0	0.00%
1980	0	0.00%
1991	0	0.00%
2001	213	—
2011	203	−4.7%
2021	198	−2.5%
Source: Censuses
