= Battle of Hart's River =

1902 battle of the Second Boer War

- Part of Second Boer War
Date	31 March 1902
Location	Harts River, South Africa
Result	Boer victory

Belligerents
United Kingdom; Canada	South African Republic

Commanders and leaders
(United Kingdom) Walter Kitchener (United Kingdom) Colonel Cookson (Canada) Bruce Carruthers	(South African Republic) Jan Kemp (Orange Free State) Koos de la Rey

Strength
1,800+	2,500+

Casualties and losses
33 killed 126 wounded 70 missing	No definitive numbers

The Battle of Hart's River, also known as the Battle of Boschbult, was fought near the end of the Second Boer War on March 31, 1902.

== Background ==
By the end of March 1902, the British had gained the upper hand in the war. They had enclosed in barbed wire more than 23,000 square kilometres of the Transvaal and 27,000 square kilometres of the Orange Free State. More than 50,000 troops patrolled the wire and manned the 8,000 blockhouses studding the line. Over 80,000 mounted troops were prepared to meet the Boers in battle.

== Battle ==
On March 31, a British column under Colonel Cookson, dispatched by General Walter Kitchener to pursue a force of 2,500 Boers under the command of generals Kemp and De La Rey, who were believed to be operating in the western Transvaal, came into contact with an advance party of Boers. The main force of the column took off after the Boers, but around 1:30 in the afternoon ran into the full force, 2,500 strong, and became encircled by the larger numbers. The Boers had brought up pieces of artillery and began shelling the British positions, using the artillery as a screen to push forward mounted troops and drive in British defenses.

The 2nd Canadian Mounted Rifles, who had been guarding the baggage train, spurred forward towards the fight and made a series of determined charges on the Boer positions to relieve pressure on the main force. Twenty-one Canadians from 3 and 4 Troops, 'E' Squadron, under the command of Lt Bruce Carruthers became cut off from the main force during a charge, but rather than surrender they determined to fight to the last, eventually running out of ammunition and being overrun. Around 5 pm, the Boers called off the attack and withdrew, having inflicted great damage on the British force and escaping with minor losses.

== Aftermath ==
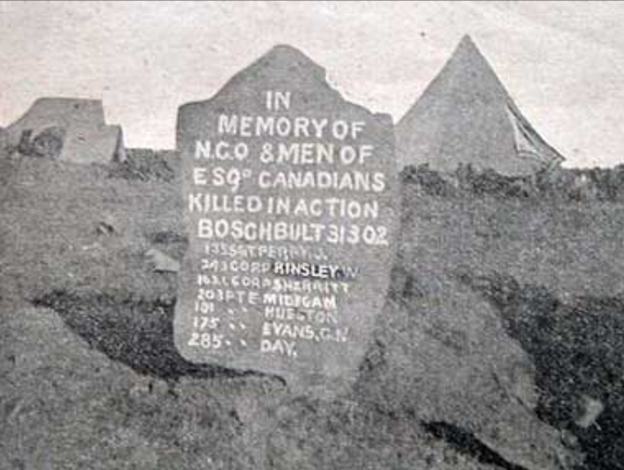
Stone erected shortly after the battle commemorating the Canadians who were killed

The Canadian Mounted Rifles suffered the most casualties during the battle, losing 13 men killed and over 40 men wounded, the second largest loss of life in battle for Canada after Paardeberg. A telegram to the Minister of Militia of Canada stated: "The regiment and field hospital have undergone [a severe] test, and have acquitted themselves most creditably. I regret the heavy losses". Lord Roberts telegraphed his congratulations to the Governor General of Canada as well as to the men in the field.

Hart's River was one of the last significant battles of the Boer War, and although it was a British defeat, the Boers could not fight on much longer, and were forced to come to the negotiating table, with peace finally being signed in May.
