= Communications and Electronics Branch =

Unified communications branch of the Canadian Armed Forces

- Branche des communications et de l'électronique (French)
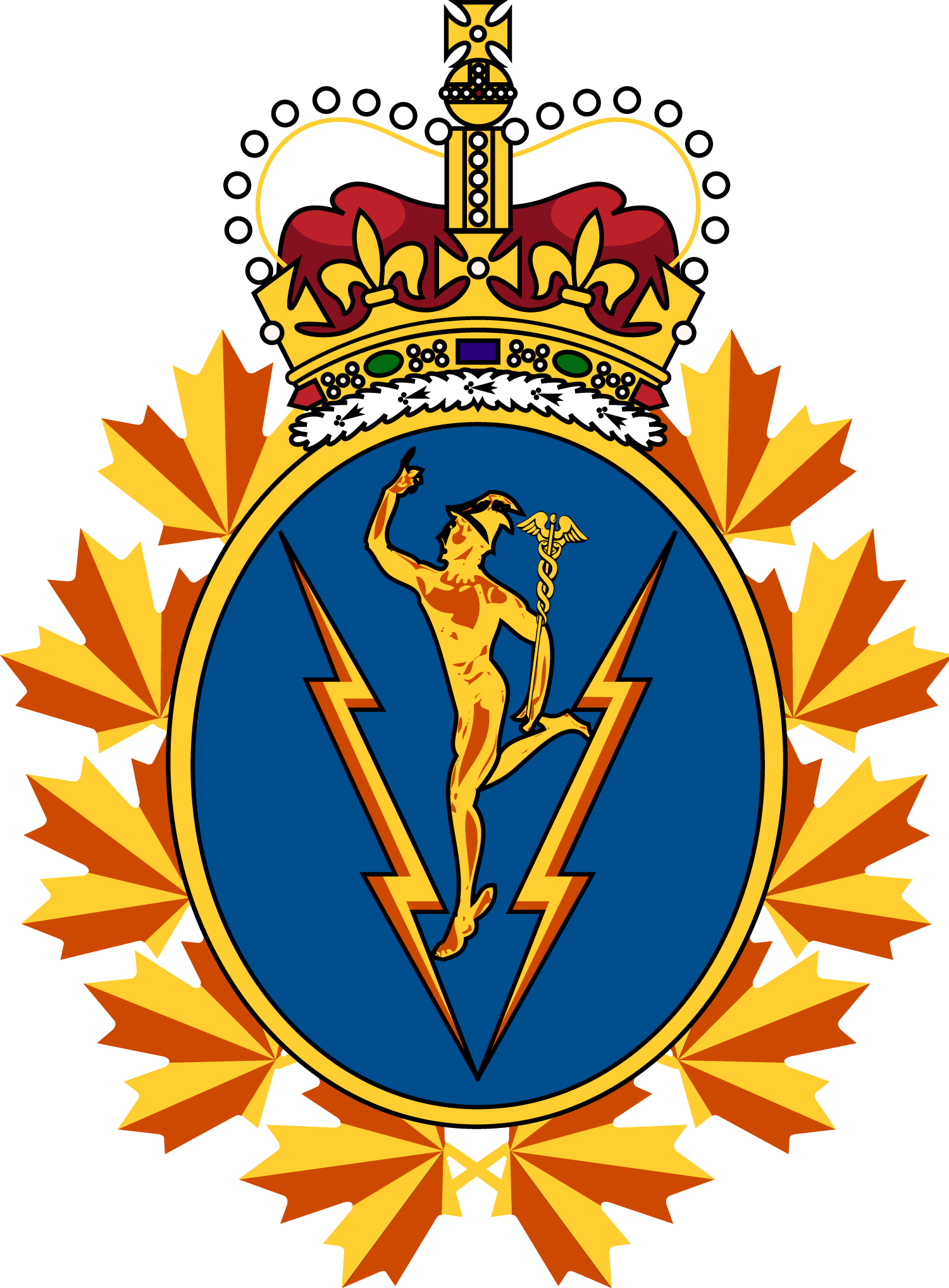
- Branch badge
- Active: 1968–present
- Country: Canada
- Branch: Canadian Armed Forces
- Type: Personnel branch
- Role: Military communications
- Home station: CFB Kingston
- Mottos: Velox, versutus, vigilans (Latin for 'Swift, Accurate, Watchful')
- Colors: French grey, dark blue (camp flag); Scarlet with black facings (RCCS mess dress)
- March: "The Mercury March"

Commanders
- Colonel-in-chief: Anne, Princess Royal

The Communications and Electronics Branch (French: Branche des communications et de l'électronique) is a personnel branch of the Canadian Armed Forces (CAF). The army component of the branch is designated the Royal Canadian Corps of Signals (French: Corps des transmissions royal du Canada).

== History ==
Major Wallace Bruce Matthews Carruthers (13 February 1863 – 21 October 1910) was the founder of the Canadian Signalling Corps, forerunner of the Royal Canadian Corps of Signals and the Communications and Electronics Branch. In the 1968 unification of the Canadian Forces, functional similar components of the Royal Canadian Navy, Canadian Army and Royal Canadian Air Force were combined into the new Communications and Electronics Branch.

During the Boer War, Carruthers noted the importance of tactical signalling in a successful campaign. Observing the employment of heliographs, semaphore flags and lamps, he realized there was a need for a unit to provide proper training in the use of these systems. Upon his return to Canada in 1902, he wrote a paper on signalling for the Royal Military College Club and championed an establishment of a signalling corps. In 1903, the formation of the Canadian Signal Corps was authorized by General Order 167. It was the first signal corps in the British Empire and is the forerunner of the Royal Canadian Corps of Signals.

On 3 February 1903, now Major Carruthers was appointed as one of two inspectors of signalling. Setting up his headquarters in Kingston, Ontario, he was responsible to the Militia Council for the supervision of instruction and practice of signalling and the inspection of signallers and their equipment. In 1904, the Provisional School of Signalling was established, with schools held in Kingston, Ottawa, Winnipeg, Montreal, Halifax, London, Quebec and Toronto over the next 2 years.

Training began in earnest in 1905 in summer militia instructional camps or in provisional schools set up in those eight cities. 546 officers and men from the rural corps were trained in semaphore at the summer camps and 68 of those had qualified as signallers over the next few years.

A reorganization of the corps in 1906 made Carruthers the Canadian Corps of Signal's commanding officer. He received the title of Assistant Adjutant General for Signalling

In April 2013, the army component of the branch was officially designated with its historic title, the Royal Canadian Corps of Signals, but it remains a part of the C&E Branch.

== Uniform ==
- Cap badge: A silver depiction of Mercury with golden lightning bolts on either side placed on a field of blue.
- Army shoulder title:
  - English: "RCCS" (all uniforms)
  - French: "CTRC" (all uniforms)
- Miscellaneous:
  - The signalman's trade qualification badge (worn on the lower sleeve of the Service Dress jacket) is the only such trade badge that features colours (blue and white) instead of just gold.

== Customs and traditions ==
- Colonel-in-Chief: Anne, Princess Royal

Flag of the Communications and Electronics Branch

- Branch flag: Horizontal bicolour, French grey (Munsell Notation 5PB5/2) over dark blue (Munsell Notation 7.5PB2/2). It is commonly believed that the colours of the flag represent "grey skies over blue waters"; however, the colours were inherited from the officer's Mess Dress uniforms of the Royal Canadian Corps of Signals (RCCS), which were in turn inherited from the 21st Lancers, the first unit of Major Carruthers, founder of the RCCS
- Home station: CFB Kingston, Ontario
- Motto: Latin: Velox Versutus Vigilans, "Swift, Accurate, Watchful"); motto inherited from the Royal Canadian Corps of Signals
- Nickname:
  - "Jimmies" – after "Jimmy", the nickname given to the Roman god Mercury as patron (and insignia) of Signals in Commonwealth countries; the origin of this particular sobriquet for the god is unknown; there are a number of theories as to why 'Jimmy' was adopted as a term of endearment for the emblem. The most widely accepted is that it came from a very popular Royal Signals boxer, Jimmy Emblem, who was the British Army Champion in 1924 and represented the Royal Signals Corps from 1921 to 1924.
  - "Sigs" – after the abbreviation of "Signals"
  - "Sig Pigs" – rhyming slang name; sometimes used deprecatingly by non-Signalmen, generally with pride by Signalmen
- Authorized march: "The Mercury March"
- Branch colours: French grey and dark blue
- Miscellaneous:
  - Signals units follow the cavalry practice of naming their units "regiment" for "battalion", "squadron" for "company", and "troop" for "platoon".
  - Trained privates in Signals or Communications units are styled "Signaller" or "Sig" for short.

== Training ==
=== Canadian Forces School of Communications and Electronics ===
The Canadian Forces School of Communications and Electronics (CFSCE) in Kingston, Ontario was founded in 1937. Initially, CFSCE provided training in Communications and Electronics in Canadian Army and now in the Canadian Armed Forces. CFSCE provides basic, intermediate and advanced training to military personnel in the field of Communications and Electronics.

== Occupations ==
Military occupations and military occupation codes (MOCs) within the branch are listed below. Also listed are the uniform environment restrictions.

Current occupations
MOSID	MOC	Occupation	Abbrev	Uniform
Officers
00340	083	Communications and Electronics Engineering	CELE	RCAF
00341	084	Signals	SIGS	CA
Non-commissioned Members
00383		Signal Operator	SIG OP	CA
00384	052	Line Technician	LINE TECH	CA
00385	227	Signal Technician	SIG TECH	CA
00394		Information System Technician	IS TECH	CA
00109	226	Aerospace Telecommunication & Information Systems Technician	ATIS TECH	RCAF
00120	291	Signals Intelligence Specialist	SIGINT Spec	RCN, CA, RCAF
00378		Cyber Operator	CYBER OP	RCN, CA, RCAF

Military occupations that have previously existed in the C&E Branch are listed below.

Past occupations
MOSID	MOC	Occupation	Abbrev	Uniform	Dates
Non-commissioned Members
00362‑1		Army Communication & Information Systems Specialist	ACISS	CA	1 Oct 2011 – 30 Aug 2020
00362‑2		Line System Technologist	LST	CA	1 Oct 2011 – 30 Aug 2020
00362‑3		Communication System Technologist	CST	CA	1 Oct 2011 – 30 Aug 2020
00362‑4		Information System Technologist	IST	CA	1 Oct 2011 – 30 Aug 2020
00362‑5		Communication Information System Technology Manager	CISTM	CA	1 Oct 2011 – 30 Aug 2020
00015	052	Lineman	LMN	CA	1 Feb 1968 – 30 Sep 2011
00329	215	Signal Operator	SIG OP	CA	1995 – 30 Sep 2011
00110	227	Land Communication and Information Systems Technician	LCIS TECH	CA	1995 – 30 Sep 2011
	211	Radio Operator	RAD OP	CA	1 Feb 1968 – 1994
	212	Teletype Operator	TEL OP		1 Feb 1968 – 1994
	221	Radio Technician	RAD TECH	CA, RCAF	1 Feb 1968 – 1994
	222	Terminal Equipment Technician	TE TECH	CA, RCAF	1 Feb 1968 – 1994
	223	Teletype and Cypher Technician	TEL Tech	CA, RCAF	1 Feb 1968 – 1994
	224	Communications Technician		CA, RCAF	1 Feb 1968 – 1994
	225	Strategic Information Systems Technician	SIS Tech	CA, RCAF	1994 - 2000
	231	Radar Technician	RDR Tech	RCAF	1 Feb 1968 – 1994

== Units ==
=== Regular Force units ===
- 1 CMBG Headquarters and Signal Squadron
- 2 CMBG Headquarters and Signal Squadron
- 21 Electronic Warfare Regiment
- 3 CDSG Signal Squadron
- 4 CDSG Signal Squadron (formerly 2 Area Support Group Signal Squadron)
- 5 CDSG Signal Squadron
- 5 CMBG Headquarters and Signal Squadron (French: Quartier général et Escadron de transmissions du 5 GBMC)
- Canadian Forces Information Operations Group
  - Canadian Forces Electronic Warfare Centre (CFEWC)
  - Canadian Forces Information Operations Group Headquarters (CFIOGHQ)
  - Canadian Forces Network Operations Centre (CFNOC)
  - Canadian Forces Signals Intelligence Operations Centre (CFSOC)
  - Canadian Forces Station Leitrim
- Canadian Forces Joint Signal Regiment
- Canadian Forces School of Communications and Electronics
- Information Management
  - 7 Communication Group
    - 76 Communication Regiment
    - 77 Line Regiment

=== Reserve Force units (up to 31 March 2012) ===
- 70 Communication Group Headquarters
  - 700 (Borden) Communication Squadron
  - 705 (Hamilton) Communication Squadron
  - 709 (Toronto) Communication Regiment
  - 763 (Ottawa) Communication Regiment
  - 772 Electronic Warfare Squadron Kingston
- 71 Communication Group Headquarters
  - 712 (Montreal) Communication Squadron
  - 713 (Beauport) Communication Regiment (French: 713^{e} Régiment des communications)
  - 714 (Sherbrooke) Communication Squadron
- 72 Communication Group Headquarters
  - 721 (Charlottetown) Communication Regiment
  - 722 (Saint John) Communication Squadron
  - 723 (Halifax) Communication Squadron
  - 725 (Glace Bay) Communication Squadron
  - 728 (St. John's) Communication Squadron
- 73 Communication Group Headquarters
  - 734 (Regina) Communication Squadron
  - 735 (Winnipeg) Communication Regiment
  - 736 (Thunder Bay) Communication Squadron
  - 737 (Saskatoon) Communication Squadron
  - 745 (Edmonton) Communication Squadron
  - 746 (Calgary) Communication Squadron
  - 749 (Red Deer) Communication Squadron
- 74 Communication Group Headquarters
  - 741 (Victoria) Communication Squadron
  - 744 (Vancouver) Communication Regiment
  - 748 (Nanaimo) Communication Squadron

=== Reserve Force units (from 1 April 2012) ===
Listed by Canadian Army Area and parent Brigade Group

- 4th Canadian Division
  - 31 Canadian Brigade Group
    - 31 Signal Regiment (formerly 705 (Hamilton) Communication Squadron)
  - 32 Canadian Brigade Group
    - 32 Signal Regiment (formerly 700 (Borden) Communication Squadron and 709 (Toronto) Communication Regiment)
  - 33 Canadian Brigade Group
    - 33 Signal Regiment (formerly 763 (Ottawa) Communication Regiment)
- 2nd Canadian Division
  - 34 Canadian Brigade Group
    - 34 Signal Regiment (formerly 712 (Montreal) Communication Squadron)
  - 35 Canadian Brigade Group
    - 35 Signal Regiment (formerly 713 (Beauport) Communication Regiment, and 714 (Sherbrooke) Communication Squadron)
- 5th Canadian Division
  - 36 Canadian Brigade Group
    - 36 Signal Regiment (formerly 721 (Charlottetown) Communication Regiment, 723 (Halifax) Communication Squadron, and 725 (Glace Bay) Communication Squadron)
  - 37 Canadian Brigade Group
    - 37 Signal Regiment (formerly 722 (Saint John) Communication Squadron, and 728 (St. John's) Communication Squadron)
- 3rd Canadian Division
  - 38 Canadian Brigade Group
    - 38 Signal Regiment (formerly 734 (Regina) Communication Squadron, 735 (Winnipeg) Communication Regiment, 736 (Thunder Bay) Communication Squadron, and 737 (Saskatoon) Communication Squadron)
  - 39 Canadian Brigade Group
    - 39 Signal Regiment (formerly 741 (Victoria) Communication Squadron, now B Squadron, 2 Troop; 744 (Vancouver) Communication Regiment, now A Squadron; and 748 (Nanaimo) Communication Squadron, now B Squadron, 1 Troop)
  - 41 Canadian Brigade Group
    - 41 Signal Regiment (formerly 745 (Edmonton) Communication Squadron, 746 (Calgary) Communication Squadron, and 749 (Red Deer) Communication Squadron)

== CFS Alert ==
Staffing at CFS Alert are the responsibility of the Branch. In the past members were drawn by the RCAF or Canadian Army.

== Order of precedence ==
Preceded by Canadian Military Engineers	Communications and Electronics Branch	Succeeded by Royal Canadian Infantry Corps
