= 2 Combat Engineer Regiment =

2 Combat Engineer Regiment 2^{e} Régiment du Génie
- Active: 1977–present
- Country: Canada
- Branch: Canadian Army
- Type: Military engineers
- Role: Combat engineers
- Size: Three squadrons + Adm Sqn
- Part of: 2 Canadian Mechanized Brigade Group
- Garrison/HQ: Garrison Petawawa
- Nickname: 2 CER
- Motto: Ubique (Everywhere)

Commanders
- Commanding Officer: Lieutenant-Colonel John Natynczyk
- RSM: CWO Daniel Roberge

Insignia
- NATO Map Symbol
- Abbreviation: 2 CER

2 Combat Engineer Regiment is a regiment of the Corps of Royal Canadian Engineers; a subdivision of the Canadian Military Engineers. It is located at Garrison Petawawa, and is part of 2 Canadian Mechanized Brigade Group. 2 CER was redesignated from 1 Field Engineer Squadron in 1977.

== History ==
=== Formation ===
In 1903, following the Boer War, the Royal Canadian Engineers were founded as the basis for the permanent military engineers, and the Canadian Engineer Corps was created as a militia unit.

=== World War I ===
One of the first tasks given to the Canadian engineers after the declaration of World War I was the construction of the Valcartier training site in Quebec. At its peak, 30,000 men were stationed there before the 1st Canadian Division was deployed. When the 1st Canadian Division arrived in Belgium, they were accompanied by the Canadian Engineer Corps. These troops were responsible for the construction of defences, sanitation systems, water supplies, bridging, and assisting with trench raids. The engineers, known as Sappers, were also tasked with digging tunnels underneath enemy trenches and planting explosives to destroy the trenches. These tunnels were strategic in winning the Battle of Vimy Ridge.

=== World War II ===
Canadian engineers spent the early phases of World War II building camps in Canada and as they deployed to the United Kingdom, turned their attention to building camps, defence work, roads and airfields in England. Sappers of the 2nd Canadian Division led the beach assault supporting the Dieppe Raid and took the second highest number of casualties after the infantry. By 1942, divisional and corps engineers turned their full attention to the invasion of Europe. They were fully engaged in the Sicilian and Italian Campaigns, the Normandy Landings and the liberation of France, Belgium and Holland. The majority of their work consisted of constructing bailey bridges, clearing mines and booby traps and building communication networks and field defences.

=== Postwar to present ===
After the Canadian Forces unified in 1968, the Royal Canadian Engineers, Royal Canadian Navy Civil Engineers and the Royal Canadian Air Force Construction Division were amalgamated. The new branch went under the name Royal Canadian Engineers until 1973 when they were renamed the Canadian Military Engineers.

In 2017, 2 Combat Engineer Regiment celebrated its 40th anniversary; and at the same time, the 20th anniversary of the Neder Rijn Engineer Park. A reunion event was held 7–9 July 2017, which was attended by over 500 members of the CME family.

2 CER is part of this history of Canadian military engineers. It provides combat engineering support to 2 CMBG.

2 CER had four soldiers killed in Afghanistan.

== Organisation ==
It currently consists of:

- 23 Field Squadron
- 24 Field Squadron
- 25 Support Squadron
- 28 Administration Squadron.

== Order of precedence ==
Preceded by 1 Combat Engineer Regiment	2 Combat Engineer Regiment	Succeeded by 4 Engineer Support Regiment

== See also ==
- Military history of Canada
- History of the Canadian Army
- Canadian Military Engineers Association
