= 36 Signal Regiment (Canada) =

- Active: April 2012 - present
- Country: Canada
- Branch: Canadian Army Primary Reserve
- Type: Signal Regiment
- Part of: 36 Canadian Brigade Group
- Garrison/HQ: Halifax and Glace Bay, Nova Scotia and Charlottetown, Prince Edward Island
- Abbreviation: 36 Sig Regt

36 Signal Regiment is Reserve unit of the Canadian Army, assigned to 36 Canadian Brigade Group. It was created on 1 April 2012 after several years of planning.

== Role ==
The role of 36 Signal Regiment is to force generate combat capable signallers and Communication Information Service (CIS) capabilities to enable command and control in support of Canadian Forces domestic and expeditionary operations.

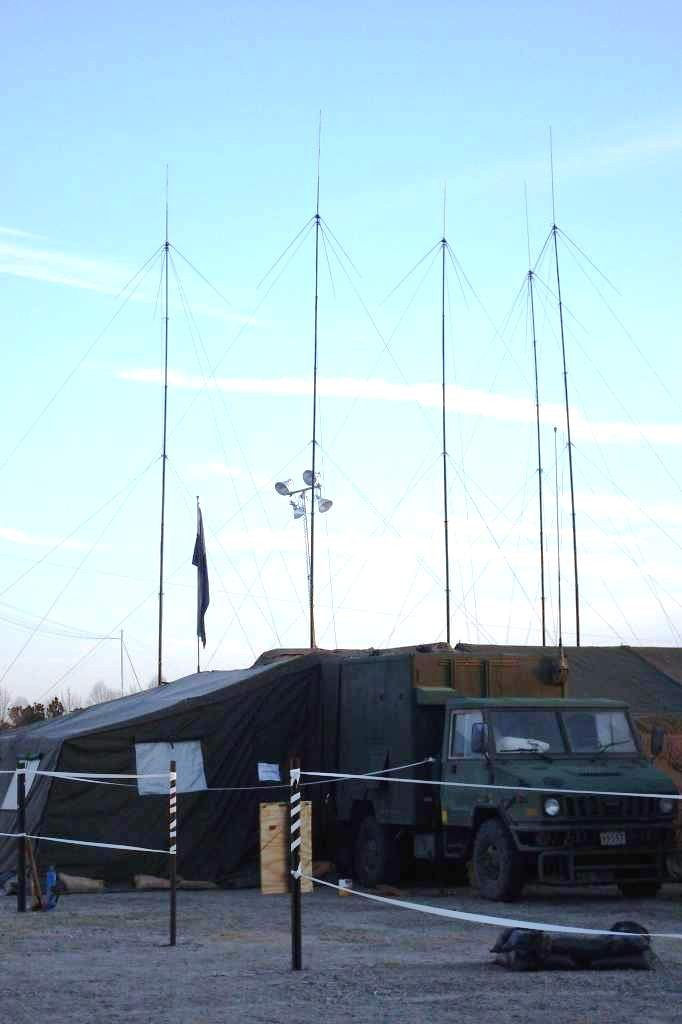
Command Post

== Organization ==
The unit was created by amalgamating three existing units into one: 721 (Charlottetown) Communication Regiment, 723 (Halifax) Communication Squadron and 725 (Glace Bay) Communication Squadron. The new unit consists of the command team and four Squadrons:

- Headquarters Squadron (Halifax) - Willow Park Armoury, Halifax, NS
- 1 Squadron (Charlottetown) - Brighton Compound, Charlottetown, PEI
- 3 Squadron (Halifax) - Willow Park Armoury, Halifax, NS
- 5 Squadron (Glace Bay) - Victoria Park Armouries, Sydney, NS

== Members ==
When fully staffed, the Regiment consists of nearly 200 soldiers and officers. Members are primarily from trades of the Royal Canadian Corps of Signals (RCCS) including Signal Officers, Signal Operators, Information Services Technicians, Signal Technicians, and Line Technicians. All RCCS trades fall under the Communications and Electronics Branch. They are supported by Logistic Officers, Human Resource Administrators, Financial Support Administrators, Materiel Management Technicians and Vehicle Technicians. The majority of positions are part-time reservists, supported by a small cadre of Regular Force members and full-time reservists on Class B contracts.

== Equipment ==
The Regiment operates a variety of vehicles, including:

- Light Support Vehicle Wheeled (LSVW)
  LSVW Command Posts
  - Command Post variant
  - Cargo variant
  - Cable laying variant
- Light Utility Vehicle Wheeled (LUVW) Militarized Commercial-Off-The-Shelf (MilCOTS)
  LUVW MilCOTS - Line Laying variant
  - Standard variant
  - Cable laying variant
- Medium Support Vehicle System (MSVS) Militarized Commercial-Off-The-Shelf (MilCOTS)
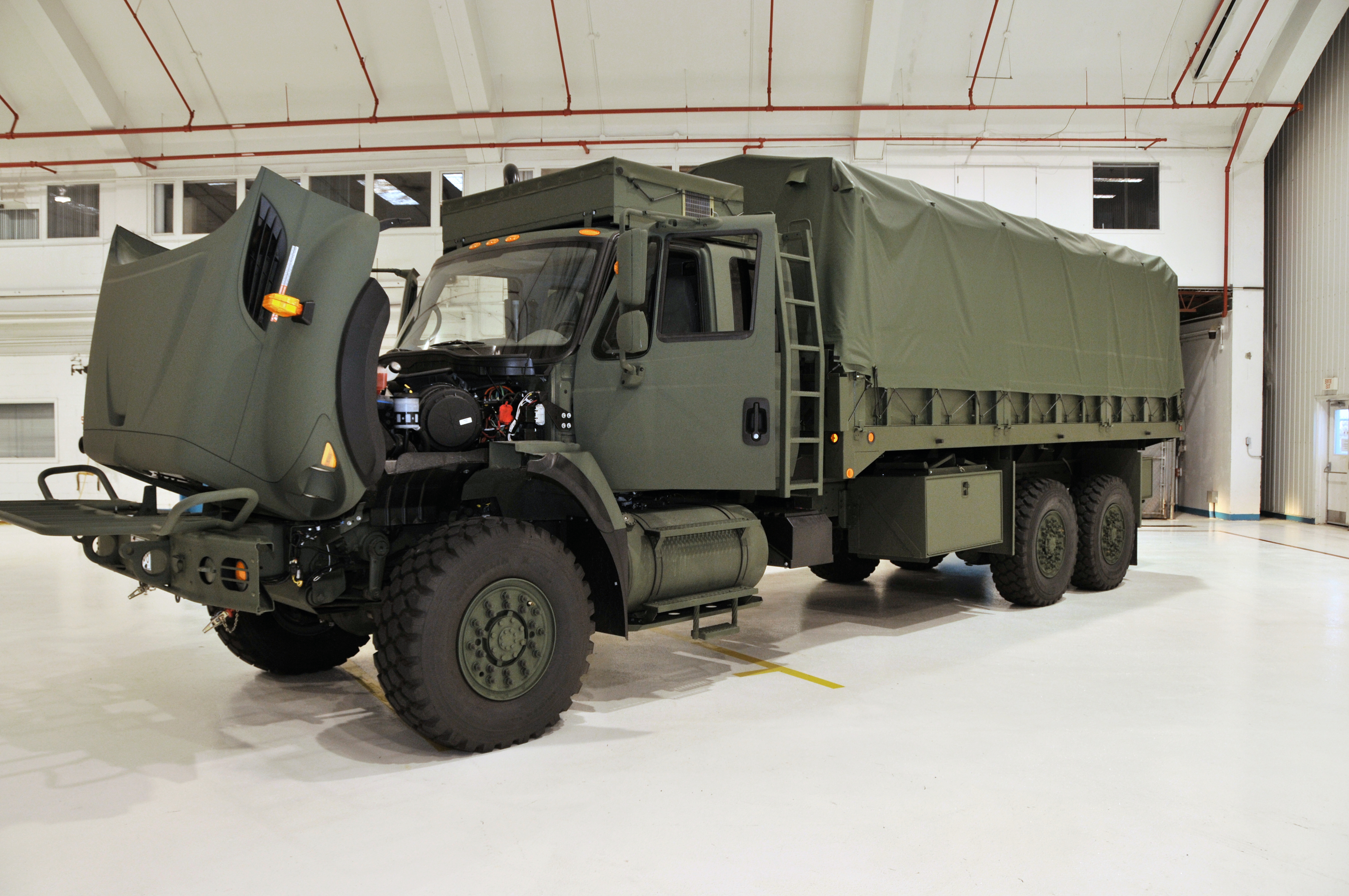
  MSVS MilCOTS
  - Cargo variant
  - Flatbed variant

Radio and Telephone equipment includes:

- Truck mounted VHF and HF Radio systems
- Man portable (MANPACK) VHF and HF Radio systems
- Static Radio systems
- Mobile Satellite Units (MSU)
- Satellite telephones
- Switchboards
- AN/PRC-138

IRIS family of radios

- AN/PRC-521
- AN/PRC-522
- AN/VRC-513 (V) 1
- AN/PRC-513 (V) 2

Personal Weapons

- C7A2 5.56mm Rifle
- Browning 9mm Pistol
- C9 5.56mm Light Machine Gun

== Histories of the old units ==
=== 721 (Charlottetown) Communication Regiment ===
UBI INCEPIT (Where it Began)

Authorization for the formation of Signals on PEI was received in 1904 and the unit stood up as 12 Signaling Section in support of the 12th Military District. The strength of the unit at this time was less than 15 all ranks. 12 Signaling Section was the second authorized Signal unit in Canada. On August 17, 1914, a detachment of 7 Signalmen from 12 Signaling Section was the first to leave Prince Edward Island for overseas service in the Great War. They served with distinction from 1914 until 1919 and were the recipients of nine decorations for service in the field. Several were mentioned in dispatches, two were wounded, but none were killed. Following the war, the unit underwent 4 name changes as Military Districts underwent organizational changes. In 1939, at the outbreak of World War II, the unit was No 6 District Signals. When mobilization orders were received on 1 September 1939, prior to Canada's declaration of war, one hundred percent of unit strength reported for duty. They served in many theaters of operation but most were assigned to 3 Divisional Signals and came ashore at Normandy on "D" Day 6 June 1944.

The present day Regiment derived its lineage from 5 Signal Regiment when it stood up in 1970. 5 Signal Regiment/721 Communication Regiment has won the prestigious Malloch Trophy, emblematic of the most proficient Signal Unit in Canada, an unprecedented 11 times, The Genet Trophy, national runner-up, once and the Beament Trophy, for top unit in the Atlantic Region, an unprecedented 16 times. In keeping with its assigned mission, the Regiment has provided personnel to numerous NATO and UN peacekeeping operations throughout the world. The unit is currently assigned the mission of providing support to community and local activities and combat capable augmentation and communication support to assigned formations. The Regiment is located at Brighton Compound, Victoria Park, Charlottetown, PEI.

=== 723 (Halifax) Communication Squadron ===
DILSEACHD OS BARR (Loyalty Above All)

723 Communication Squadron can be traced back almost to the inception of the Canadian Signals Corps. On 24 October 1903, General Order 167 authorized the formation of the Canadian Signals Corps, the first independent Signals Corps in the British Empire. In 1904, Militia Order No. 45, dated 24 February 1904, authorized the signals corps an establishment of 90 all ranks. This included 18 officers and 72 NCM's, which was broken down to 1 signals officer, 6 signalmen and 7 enlisted personnel per militia district with No. 9 Signals Section in Halifax. In April 1911, reorganization created No. 6 Signal Company Halifax, Nova Scotia. The headquarters was located in Halifax but sub units were deployed throughout the region including: Woodstock, Saint John, Salt Springs and Charlottetown. This organization lasted until after World War I. On 6 August 1914, General Order 172 authorized the formation of 1 Canadian Division Signals Company. On August 20, 1914, the company began forming in Valcartier for overseas deployment. This Company was brought up to strength by drafts from 1, 2, 3 and 6 Signal Companies. The 1st Division Signal Company reached the Western Front on 15 Jan 1915. Through the war 4 Divisional Signal Companies were formed, Major T.E. Powers commanded the 3rd Divisional Signal Company in France. After the war the reorganization of the Non Permanent Army Militia (NPAM) began in the 1920s. The Dominion of Canada was divided into 11 Military Districts with one Signal Battalion for each plus two fortress Companies in Halifax and Vancouver, seven troops and 19 Signal Companies. Nova Scotia consisted of Military District 6. Halifax became 6 Fortress Signal Company. On 1 April 1936 this unit became Supplementary to Eastern Fortress Establishment. As of 3 September 1939, written in an order for battle which listed District 6 Signals Permanent Force as No. 6 Detachment Halifax with its NPAM as No. 6 Fortress Signal Company Halifax.

During World War II, 6 Fortress Signal Company helped with the defence of Halifax and Eastern Approaches. This however did not limit personnel from volunteering for overseas duty and members helped to augment Signals units that went overseas. As the war progressed, responsibilities developed and in 1941 fortress signals transformed into Area Signal Companies under Atlantic Command Signals, Royal Canadian Corps Signals. No. 6 Signal Company was located in Halifax. Communications facilities were built across the Maritimes to support all units assigned to the defence of the East Coast. All this construction also provided valuable experience for reinforcements to Europe.

After the war between 1945 and 1948 the active component of the signal unit was reorganized to become Eastern Command Signal Regiment, the reserve component became East Coast Signal Regiment. East Coast Signal Regiment had a HQ in Halifax with 1 Area Signal Squadron in Halifax, 2 Area Signal Squadron in Saint John and No. 4 Troop 1 Area Signal Squadron located in Glace Bay. In the 1950s discussions were held and it was recommended by the Signals Association and reserve Commanding Officers that all units should reflect the same Regimental Model. Hence the renaming of the Regiment to, 6th Signal Regiment Halifax, in 1960. In 1956 Glace Bay was reduced to nil strength and in 1960 St John became independent. The unit moved into the Cogswell Street Barracks in 1949, and again to the Halifax Armouries in 1953 where is still resides today. In 1965 was the formation of Canadian Forces Communication Systems (CFCS) and in 1968 was the unification of the Canadian Forces. Through all these changes the militia suffered huge budget cuts in 1965 and like many other units the 6th Signal Regiment HQ was retired to the supplementary order and 1 Area Signal Squadron Halifax remained. Even with the cuts training remained the same. In 1970 CFCS became official and was now called Canadian Forces Communication Command (CFCC). All signal reserves were now under the Command of CFCC rather than the Army. This brings us to the formation of the Group Headquarters across Canada with 72 Communication Group taking control of all the Maritime Reserve Communication units. 723 Communication Squadron Halifax as we all know has been created.

In 2008 the Communication Reserve began its transformation back to the Army after almost 40 years. After a few ideas being thrown around like Operational Support Groups (OSG's) a decision was made that by September 2010 the Group Headquarters would dissolve and each Brigade Group would form a Signal Regiment. Halifax was to become 36 Signal Regiment with a Headquarters in Halifax and its sub units being 721 Communication Regiment Charlottetown, 723 Communication Squadron Halifax and 725 Communication Squadron Glace Bay.

=== 725 (Glace Bay) Communication Squadron ===
The badge of 725 Communication Squadron was chosen for its historical significance to communications world and the role that Glace Bay and Guglielmo Marconi played in the first official radio message to Poldhu, Cornwall, England, in 1905. The towers and building were located in Table Head, Glace Bay, which overlooks the Atlantic Ocean. A public service began between the stations on October 15, 1907, with ten thousand words being exchanged on the first day.

DEFERO PER PERSERVERANTIA (Communications through Persistence)

Prior to 1956 there was No. 4 Troop 1 Area Signal Squadron located in Glace Bay. In 1987 a detachment of 721 Communication Regiment was established in Glace Bay to provide communication support to the Militia units in the Cape Breton Area. It was through the hard work of LCol J. Addicott that the unit was established. In 1993, CF Communication Command (CFCC) recognized that the demands on the Detachment required an increase in its establishment to unit size and indicated its intention to reorganize it as 725 (Glace Bay) Communications Squadron. It also directed that the Det be placed under Comd of 72 Communication Group in Halifax until the unit could be formally established. Unfortunately, the proposed changes were not accepted due to budget cuts and the unit remained under command of 721 Communication Regiment. 721 Communication Troop remained the only Troop in the Communication Reserve, until the concept of making the unit into a Squadron was revived. On 20 September 2005 Ministerial Organization Order 2005013 was approved by Bill Graham, Minister of National Defence directing 725 Communication Squadron to organize as a unit of the Canadian Forces; directing the unit to be embodied in the Reserve Force; and that the new entity be allocated to 72 Communication Group. On 10 December 2005, 725 Communication Squadron held an Official Stand-Up Parade.

The current location of Squadron is 400 metres from the Marconi National Historic Site of Canada at Table Head, where Guglielmo Marconi established transatlantic radio communications. It is also 100 km from Baddeck, Nova Scotia, where Alexander Graham Bell moved after inventing the telephone. The inventions of both these gentlemen are the foundations of modern military communications.
