= Křišťanov =

- Municipality
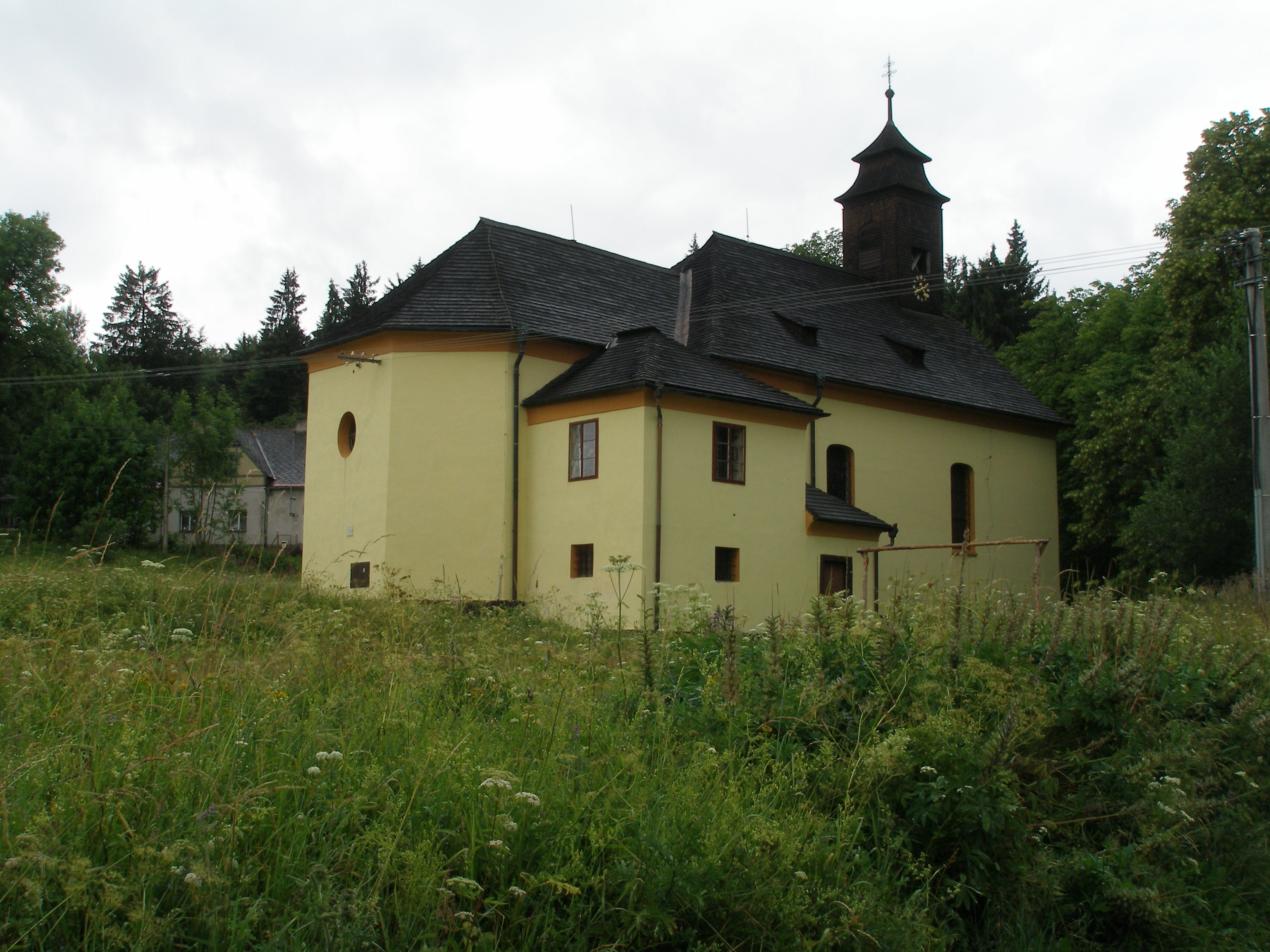
- Church of the Name of Jesus

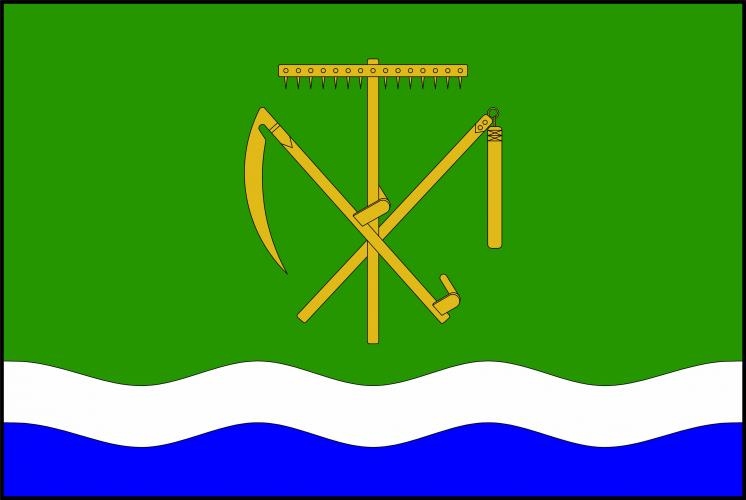
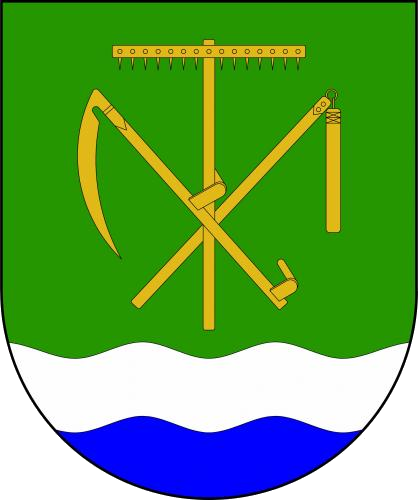
- Flag Coat of arms

- Location in the Czech Republic
- Coordinates: 48°54′33″N 14°1′12″E
- Country: Czech Republic
- Region: South Bohemian
- District: Prachatice
- First mentioned: 1694

Area
  - Total: 18.07 km^{2} (6.98 sq mi)
- Elevation: 925 m (3,035 ft)

Population (2026-01-01)
  - Total: 89
  - Density: 4.9/km^{2} (13/sq mi)
- Time zone: UTC+1 (CET)
  - Summer (DST): UTC+2 (CEST)
- Postal code: 383 01
- Website: www.kristanov.com

Křišťanov (German: Christianberg) is a municipality and village in Prachatice District in the South Bohemian Region of the Czech Republic. It has about 90 inhabitants.

Křišťanov lies approximately 12 kilometres (7 mi) south of Prachatice, 34 km (21 mi) west of České Budějovice, and 134 km (83 mi) south of Prague.

== Administrative division ==
Křišťanov consists of three municipal parts (in brackets population according to the 2021 census):

- Křišťanov (45)
- Arnoštov (32)
- Markov (4)

== Demographics ==
Historical population
| Year | Pop. | ±% |
|---|---|---|
| 1869 | 1,404 | — |
| 1880 | 1,595 | +13.6% |
| 1890 | 1,595 | +0.0% |
| 1900 | 1,531 | −4.0% |
| 1910 | 1,574 | +2.8% |
| 1921 | 1,500 | −4.7% |
| 1930 | 1,541 | +2.7% |
| 1950 | 168 | −89.1% |
| 1961 | 220 | +31.0% |
| 1970 | 272 | +23.6% |
| 1980 | 251 | −7.7% |
| 1991 | 154 | −38.6% |
| 2001 | 145 | −5.8% |
| 2011 | 87 | −40.0% |
| 2021 | 81 | −6.9% |
Source: Censuses
