= 2 Canadian Mechanized Brigade Group =

Brigade of the Canadian Army

- Active: 1995–present
- Country: Canada
- Branch: Canadian Army Regular Force
- Type: Headquarters
- Part of: 1st Canadian Division
- Garrison/HQ: CFB Petawawa
- Mottos: Latin: Audacia et fortitudo (Strength and courage)

Insignia
NATO Map Symbol
2
1
- Abbreviation: 2 CMBG

2 Canadian Mechanized Brigade Group (2CMBG; French: 2^{e} Groupe-brigade mécanisé du Canada, 2GBMC) is a Canadian Forces brigade group that falls under 1st Canadian Division of the Canadian Army. It is currently based at CFB Petawawa. One of its three infantry battalions is administered by 5th Canadian Division and stationed at CFB Gagetown in New Brunswick.

== Brigade units ==
Structure of the 2 CMBG

The brigade group's composition, as at 11 September 2026, is as follows:

2 Canadian Mechanized Brigade Group	Type	Location
2 CMBG Headquarters & Signal Squadron	HQ/Communications	CFB Petawawa
The Royal Canadian Dragoons	Armoured	CFB Petawawa
2 Combat Engineer Regiment	Engineering	CFB Petawawa
1st Battalion, The Royal Canadian Regiment	Mechanized infantry	CFB Petawawa
2nd Battalion, The Royal Canadian Regiment	Mechanized infantry	CFB Gagetown
2 Service Battalion	Combat Service Support	CFB Petawawa

As part of the Canadian Army's major restructuring in September 2026, 2 CMBG gave up its artillery regiment - 2nd Regiment, Royal Canadian Horse Artillery - and its light infantry battalion - 3rd Battalion, Royal Canadian Regiment - to the 1st Canadian Artillery Brigade and the 3rd Canadian Light Infantry Regiment respectively.

Two regular force units from other formations, 450 Tactical Helicopter Squadron (of 1 Wing, Royal Canadian Air Force) and 2 Field Ambulance (of the Canadian Forces Health Services Group), are located with 2 CMBG at CFB Petawawa and collaborate closely with the brigade group, though they are not technically under its full command. 2 Field Ambulance is under 2CMBG's operational control.

== See also ==
- Military history of Canada
- History of the Canadian Army
- Canadian Forces
- List of armouries in Canada
