= 450 Tactical Helicopter Squadron =

- Active: March 29, 1968
- Country: Canada
- Branch: Royal Canadian Air Force
- Type: Aviation squadron
- Motto: By air to battle

Aircraft flown
- Helicopter: CH147F Chinook

450 Tactical Helicopter Squadron is a Royal Canadian Air Force helicopter squadron. During the Second World War, the numerical designation of 450 was originally given to No. 450 Squadron of the Royal Australian Air Force, which flew under that number from 1941 until 1945 in the Middle East and Italy. Canadian Article XV squadrons during the Second World War had used numbers from 400 to 449; however, due to an administrative error, the "450" designation was used when squadron formed at RCAF Station St. Hubert, Quebec, on March 29, 1968.

The squadron moved to CFB Ottawa (Uplands) in May 1970 and the squadron received Royal Assent for the designation 450 Transport Helicopter Squadron on May 20, 1970. On August 1, 1991, the squadron was re-designated 450 Composite Helicopter Squadron. This was followed by another name change on April 1, 1993, when the squadron became 450 Tactical Helicopter Squadron. In August the following year, 450 Tactical Helicopter Squadron was transferred back to 1 Wing at CFB St. Hubert.

450 Squadron was deactivated in 1996 before being officially disbanded on January 1, 1998. On May 2, 2012, the squadron was re-established to operate the CH-147F Chinook helicopters of the Royal Canadian Air Force, based out of CFB Petawawa.

The squadron has a dedicated concrete helipad, measuring 160 ft × 160 ft (49 m × 49 m), at Petawawa Heliport.

On June 20, 2023, there was an unknown incident over the Petawawa River involving one of the CH-147F helicopters. There were 4 crew on board at the time, 2 of whom were sent to hospital with non-life-threatening injuries while the search continued for the remaining 2. On June 21, 2023, the bodies of the remaining 2 crew members were recovered from the Ottawa River.
