= Petawawa =

- Town (lower-tier)
- Town of Petawawa
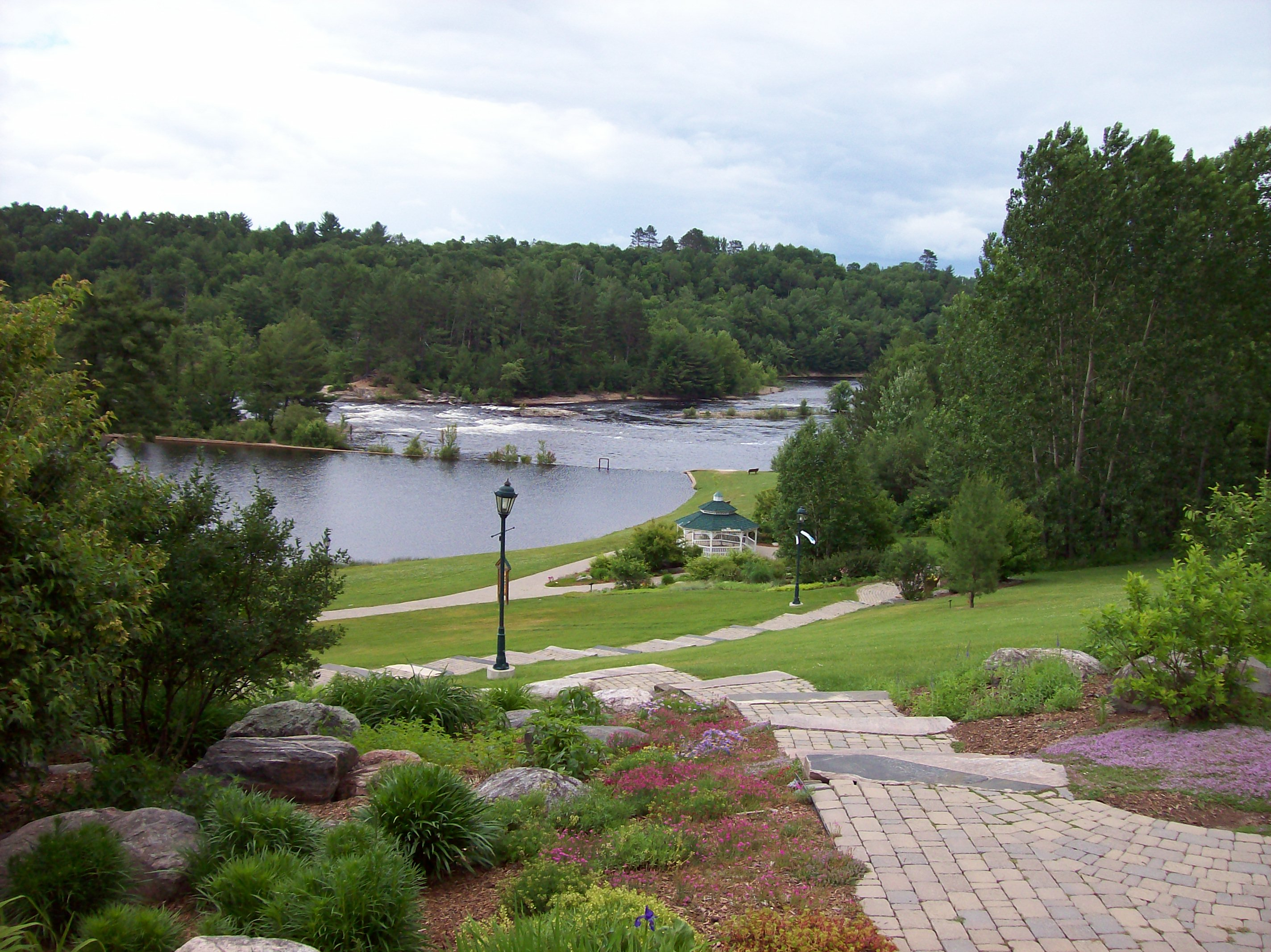
- Emerald Necklace Trail and the Petawawa River

- Location within Renfrew County Location within Southern Ontario Location within Ontario Location within Canada Location within North America
- Coordinates: 45°54′N 77°17′W
- Country: Canada
- Province: Ontario
- County: Renfrew
- Incorporated (town): July 1, 1997

Government
  - Mayor: Gary Serviss
  - Governing Body: Petawawa Town Council
  - MPs: Cheryl Gallant
  - MPP: Billy Denault

Area
  - Land: 164.70 km^{2} (63.59 sq mi)

Population (2021)
  - Total: 18,160
  - Density: 110.3/km^{2} (286/sq mi)
- Time zone: UTC−5 (EST)
  - Summer (DST): UTC−4 (EDT)
- Postal code: K8H
- Website: www.petawawa.ca

Petawawa (/ˈpɛtəwɒwɒ/ PET-ə-WAW-waw) is a town located in the eastern portion of Southern Ontario, Canada. Situated in the Ottawa Valley, with a population of 18,160 (2021 Census), Petawawa is the most populous municipality in Renfrew County.

== History ==
The earliest settlement in the Petawawa area was inhabited by the Algonquin First Nation. The name of Petawawa originates from a local Algonquin language word, biidaawewe, meaning "where one hears a noise like this". The original spelling of the name of the town was Petewawa and while there are no sources showing when it officially changed to Petawawa, Privy Council documents indicate the name Petawawa being formally used in correspondence as early as 27 March 1907. Research of photographs after 1916 with the former spelling have not been found. While the records of the official name change are non-existent, it has been speculated that the influx of immigration to the area changed the pronunciation of the word from its native roots to a more European pronunciation. Over time this may have changed the spelling of the Town's name into the present day format.

In the late 19th century, the area was surveyed and settled by emigres from Scotland, Ireland and Germany. The land was unsuitable for crops, but the heavily forested surroundings were useful for logging. Petawawa was incorporated as a township in 1865. The Canadian military acquired land in the area in 1905, which later became Canadian Forces Base Petawawa. During this period it was used as an internment camp for German POWs during World War I. and World War II. Later, it became home to the Canadian Airborne Regiment before it was disbanded in 1995. Today, it is one of Canada's largest ground forces bases with members deployed throughout the world on various missions supporting the United Nations in peacekeeping or the war on terror.

In 1961, the urban area of Petawawa was incorporated as a separate village municipality. On July 1, 1997, the village and township amalgamated to form the Town of Petawawa.

== Geography ==
The town lies on the west bank of the Ottawa River, at the confluence of the Petawawa River. Situated across the Ottawa River from the Laurentian Mountains, and east of Algonquin Park, Petawawa is a favourite stop for outdoor enthusiasts, anglers, hikers, canoers, and kayakers.

In addition to the primary urban core of Petawawa, the town also comprises the communities of Black Bay, Kramer Subdivision, Laurentian View, McGuire, Petawawa Point, Pine Meadows, Pine Ridge, Pinehurst Estates and Riverview.

=== Climate ===
Petawawa has a humid continental climate (Köppen Dfb) with long, cold, snowy winters and warm summers.

Climate data for Petawawa Airport (1991–2020 normals, extremes 1915–present)
Month	Jan	Feb	Mar	Apr	May	Jun	Jul	Aug	Sep	Oct	Nov	Dec	Year
Record high humidex	10.0	14.8	30.4	36.3	42.3	42.8	47.5	46.3	43.1	36.1	24.9	18.1	47.5
Record high °C (°F)	14.4 (57.9)	13.8 (56.8)	27.8 (82.0)	32.0 (89.6)	35.5 (95.9)	36.4 (97.5)	39.4 (102.9)	38.9 (102.0)	35.6 (96.1)	31.1 (88.0)	23.3 (73.9)	17.2 (63.0)	39.4 (102.9)
Mean maximum °C (°F)	5.3 (41.5)	7.2 (45.0)	13.9 (57.0)	23.9 (75.0)	30.7 (87.3)	32.3 (90.1)	32.8 (91.0)	32.2 (90.0)	29.3 (84.7)	23.8 (74.8)	15.7 (60.3)	8.3 (46.9)	34.1 (93.4)
Mean daily maximum °C (°F)	−6.1 (21.0)	−3.6 (25.5)	2.7 (36.9)	10.8 (51.4)	19.2 (66.6)	24.0 (75.2)	26.3 (79.3)	25.2 (77.4)	20.6 (69.1)	12.8 (55.0)	4.8 (40.6)	−2.4 (27.7)	11.2 (52.2)
Daily mean °C (°F)	−11.9 (10.6)	−10.2 (13.6)	−3.7 (25.3)	4.5 (40.1)	12.0 (53.6)	17.0 (62.6)	19.3 (66.7)	18.4 (65.1)	14.0 (57.2)	7.5 (45.5)	0.3 (32.5)	−7.3 (18.9)	5.0 (41.0)
Mean daily minimum °C (°F)	−17.9 (−0.2)	−16.6 (2.1)	−10.0 (14.0)	−2.0 (28.4)	4.5 (40.1)	10.0 (50.0)	12.3 (54.1)	11.6 (52.9)	7.3 (45.1)	2.1 (35.8)	−4.1 (24.6)	−11.9 (10.6)	−1.2 (29.8)
Mean minimum °C (°F)	−32.6 (−26.7)	−30.3 (−22.5)	−25.5 (−13.9)	−10.5 (13.1)	−3.9 (25.0)	2.4 (36.3)	6.0 (42.8)	4.3 (39.7)	−1.1 (30.0)	−6.3 (20.7)	−15.3 (4.5)	−26.5 (−15.7)	−33.7 (−28.7)
Record low °C (°F)	−41.1 (−42.0)	−39.4 (−38.9)	−37.2 (−35.0)	−26.1 (−15.0)	−9.4 (15.1)	−2.5 (27.5)	2.0 (35.6)	−1.1 (30.0)	−5.2 (22.6)	−12.6 (9.3)	−24.9 (−12.8)	−38.9 (−38.0)	−41.1 (−42.0)
Record low wind chill	−51.7	−46.0	−39.9	−25.8	−11.6	−4.3	0.0	−3.4	−7.9	−14.1	−33.3	−45.3	−51.8
Average precipitation mm (inches)	68.1 (2.68)	51.0 (2.01)	57.7 (2.27)	79.0 (3.11)	84.8 (3.34)	96.1 (3.78)	89.1 (3.51)	90.3 (3.56)	83.4 (3.28)	83.1 (3.27)	77.2 (3.04)	71.8 (2.83)	931.5 (36.67)
Average rainfall mm (inches)	17.8 (0.70)	12.5 (0.49)	28.9 (1.14)	64.1 (2.52)	84.1 (3.31)	96.1 (3.78)	89.1 (3.51)	90.3 (3.56)	83.4 (3.28)	79.1 (3.11)	51.7 (2.04)	23.9 (0.94)	720.9 (28.38)
Average snowfall cm (inches)	49.4 (19.4)	38.0 (15.0)	26.5 (10.4)	11.1 (4.4)	0.5 (0.2)	0.0 (0.0)	0.0 (0.0)	0.0 (0.0)	0.0 (0.0)	3.4 (1.3)	25.0 (9.8)	45.1 (17.8)	199.0 (78.3)
Average precipitation days (≥ 0.2 mm)	16.6	13.4	12.2	13.0	14.2	14.2	13.9	13.3	14.0	15.9	16.4	17.4	174.4
Average rainy days (≥ 0.2 mm)	3.5	3.1	5.9	11.7	14.1	14.2	13.9	13.3	14.0	15.4	11.1	5.7	125.8
Average snowy days (≥ 0.2 cm)	15.3	12.1	7.6	2.6	0.26	0.0	0.0	0.0	0.0	0.82	7.3	13.6	59.4
Average relative humidity (%) (at 15:00 LST)	67.1	59.5	53.0	48.1	48.2	54.4	54.0	56.6	59.7	61.7	68.4	72.8	58.6
Average dew point °C (°F)	−14.7 (5.5)	−14.0 (6.8)	−9.1 (15.6)	−2.7 (27.1)	5.1 (41.2)	11.6 (52.9)	14.3 (57.7)	13.8 (56.8)	10.3 (50.5)	3.6 (38.5)	−2.6 (27.3)	−9.2 (15.4)	0.5 (32.9)
Mean monthly sunshine hours	93.9	124.6	145.5	179.9	230.3	246.0	276.5	240.8	150.3	120.4	67.4	66.1	1,941.5
Percentage possible sunshine	33.3	42.7	39.5	44.3	49.7	52.3	58.1	54.9	39.8	35.4	23.6	24.5	41.5
Source 1: Environment and Climate Change Canada (sun 1971–2000)
Source 2: weatherstats.ca (for dewpoint and monthly&yearly average absolute maximum&minimum temperature)

== Demographics ==
In the 2021 Census of Population conducted by Statistics Canada, Petawawa had a population of 18,160 living in 6,762 of its 7,174 total private dwellings, a change of 5.7% from its 2016 population of 17,187. With a land area of 164.7 km^{2} (63.6 sq mi), it had a population density of 110.3/km^{2} (285.6/sq mi) in 2021.

Historical populations

Year	Pop.	±%
1951	1,017	—
1961	4,509	+343.4%
1966	5,574	+23.6%
1971	5,784	+3.8%
1976	5,815	+0.5%
1981	5,520	−5.1%
1986	5,580	+1.1%

Year	Pop.	±%
1991	5,793	+3.8%
1996	6,540	+12.9%
2001	14,398	+120.2%
2006	14,651	+1.8%
2011	15,988	+9.1%
2016	17,187	+7.5%
2021	18,160	+5.7%

Pre-2001 figures are for the Village of Petawawa; 2001 figures onward are for the Town of Petawawa.

Special Note: According to the 1961 Census Of Canada, in CS92-539, Table 6, Page 113, the Village Of Petawawa was Incorporated out of territory formerly belonging to the Township Of Petawawa on January 1, 1961. Thus any earlier pre-1961 population figures for urban Petawawa were for unincorporated communities still belonging to the Township Of Petawawa at that time.

Mother tongue (2021):

- English as first language: 83.5 %
- French as first language: 9.9 %
- English and French as first languages: 1.8 %
- Other as first language: 4.0 %

== Economy ==
Petawawa's primary employer is the Canadian Government. Most of Petawawa's residents work as civilian employees, or as members of the Canadian Forces at CFB Petawawa which is home to 2 Canadian Mechanized Brigade Group and 4 Canadian Division Support Group.

Another major employer is Chalk River Laboratories located nearby in Chalk River.

== Transportation ==
Ontario Highway 17, Ontario Northlands bus service from Ottawa and the local commercial airport (Pembroke Airport) located in Petawawa, all provide access to this town.

== Notable residents ==
- Roy Giesebrecht, hockey player
- Tom Green, comedian, actor
- Tommy Mac, musician
- Lloyd Mohns, hockey player
- Matthew Peca, hockey player
- Joe Reekie, hockey player
- Mike Rowe, hockey player
- Ray Sheppard, hockey player

== See also ==
- List of communities in Ontario
- List of townships in Ontario
- List of francophone communities in Ontario
