= The Mercury March =

March composed in 1974 by Major Albert Furey

The Mercury March was a song composed in 1974 by Major Albert Cornelius (Con) Furey. It is the march for the Communications and Electronics Branch of the Canadian Forces.
