= 4th Canadian Division Support Group =

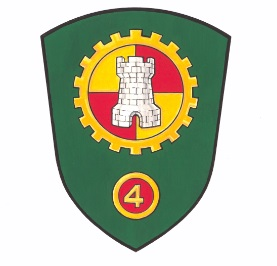
- Active: 1999–present
- Country: Canada
- Type: Combat Service Support
- Role: Support all force generation and domestic operations within 4th Canadian Division.
- Part of: 4th Canadian Division
- Garrison/HQ: Garrison Petawawa (HQ)
- Motto: Sustinemus Arma (Support the Warrior)
- Colors: Green, Red and Gold
- Anniversaries: 4 February 1999

Commanders
- Commander: Colonel K. Larocque, MSC, CD
- Formation Sergeant Major: Chief Warrant Officer T.B. Buchanan, MMM, MSM, CD

The 4th Canadian Division Support Group (4 CDSG) is a Regular Force Army Formation within the 4th Canadian Division (4 Can Div). 4 CDSG provides garrison-based institutional support to all Army formations within Ontario, be they deployed in Canada or abroad, and support all lodger units housed in the assigned areas of responsibility. The current Commander of 4 CDSG is Colonel S.D.C. Trentholm.

== History ==
The formation was established as 2 Area Support Group on 4 February 1999 with its headquarters in Toronto, Ontario. The headquarters was relocated to Garrison Petawawa from Toronto on 28 September 2006. In July 2013, the formation was renamed as 4th Canadian Division Support Group coinciding with an Army-wide reorganization of garrison forces and with the renaming of Land Forces Central Area to 4th Canadian Division.

== Mission ==
Provide garrison-based institutional support to all CAF (CA, RCN, RCAF, CANSOF, other L1s and Primary and Supplementary Reserve) units within our area of responsibility in order to enable CAF operational readiness and excellence.

== Units ==
- 4 CDSB Petawawa Personnel Services
- 4 CDSB Petawawa Operations Services
- 4 CDSB Petawawa Technical Services
- 4 CDSG Signal Squadron

== Branches ==
- 4 CDSG Corporate Services
- 4 CDSG Environment Services
- 4 CDSG Safety Services
