= Garrison Petawawa =

Canadian Armed Forces base in Renfrew County, Ontario

4 CDSB Petawawa
- Canada
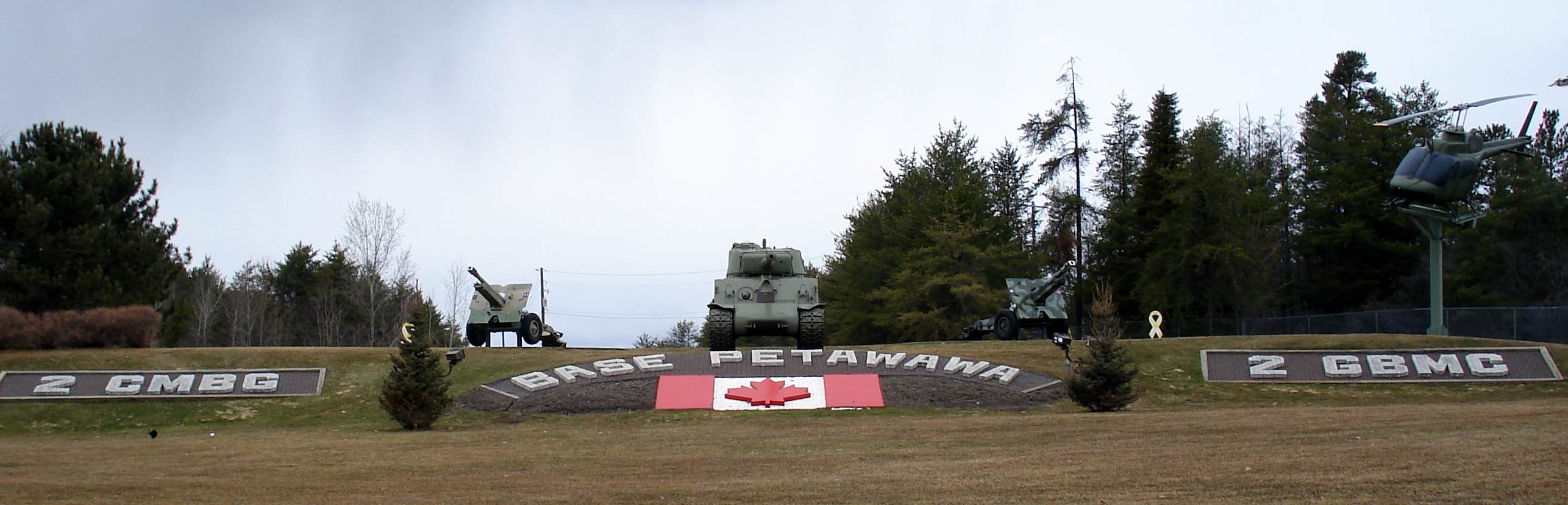
- The main entrance to the base.

Location
- Coordinates: 45°54′36″N 77°17′24″W

4 Canadian Division Support Base Petawawa, commonly referred to as Garrison Petawawa, is located in Petawawa, Ontario. It is operated as an army base by the Canadian Army.

== Current use ==
Petawawa Heliport
- IATA: YWA; ICAO: CYWA

Summary
- Airport type: Military
- Operator: DND
- Serves: Garrison Petawawa
- Location: Petawawa, Ontario
- Time zone: EST (UTC−05:00)
  - Summer (DST): EDT (UTC−04:00)
- Elevation AMSL: 427 ft (130 m)
- Coordinates: 45°57′00.40″N 077°19′03.26″W

Map
- Location in Ontario CYWA (Canada)

Helipads
Number	Length		Surface
Number	ft	m	Surface
17H/35H	1,630	497	Reinforced concrete
427 sqd pad	150	46	Concrete
450 sqd pad	160	49	Concrete
- Source: Canada Flight Supplement

The Garrison is located in the Ottawa Valley in Renfrew County, 170 km (110 mi) northwest of Ottawa along the western bank of the Ottawa River. Its main gate is North of the town of Petawawa. The majority of the base territory is in the municipality of Laurentian Hills, with portions also in Petawawa and Deep River.

As of March 2022, the approximate personnel numbers are as follows:

- Canadian Forces personnel: 6,000
- DND civilian employees: 1,000
- Canadian Forces dependents: 5,653

Approximately 6,000 people directly connected to the base live in local communities between Deep River and Pembroke.

The Garrison has an extensive infrastructure with 465 buildings and over 300 km^{2} (120 sq mi) of property comprising the Petawawa Training Area.

=== Fitness facilities ===
Dundonald Hall is the Garrison's main fitness facility and is located on Festubert Boulevard. It houses a 5,000 m^{2} (54,000 sq ft) field house containing a 200 m (660 ft) indoor running track, a 25 m (82 ft) swimming pool, a wading pool equipped with a winding water slide, and whirlpool and sauna facilities.

The complex houses a gymnasium, aerobic studio, teen room, preschool play rooms and meeting rooms. The "Rec Plex" is home to numerous clubs and societies on the base such as the Karate Club, Preschool Clubs and the Indoor Rock Climbing Club.

=== Recreation ===
The South Side Community Centre offers similar facilities and services to another area of the Petawawa community, including Recreation Service's and Military Family Resources Services.

During the summer, recreation options include golf on the base's 18-hole course, hiking local trails, beaches on local lakes and rivers, a full service marina for sail and power boating on the Ottawa River, or camping along the banks of the Ottawa River.

Winter recreation options include cross country ski trails, snowmobiling and ice fishing.

== History ==
Founded in 1905 as the Petawawa Military Camp, or Camp Petawawa, the Garrison was created by the Department of Militia and Defence upon the purchase of 90.8 square kilometres (22,430 acres) of mostly agricultural property from local residents.

The Garrison derives its name from the Petawawa River. The origin of the name PETAWAWA is lost in antiquity, but legend has it that it is an Algonquian Native-Aboriginal word pronounced PETWEWE. The translation is thought to mean, "Where one hears noise like this", referring to the sound of the fast water over the rocks in the river. In another legend it is said that the area was named after an indigenous woman who inhabited the banks of the Petawawa River and lived to the age of 115 years.

Early French explorers used a trail or route through this area. The Mattawa Trail, now called Mattawa Road still exists on parts of the base today. The site was originally a German immigrant settlement. German pioneers toiled to build a community out of the harsh and rugged terrain. Some of the topographical features in the training area still bear the names of these early settlers.

By 1904 the Department of Militia and Defence purchased 150 properties from these settlers totaling 90 km^{2} (35 sq mi). The Royal Canadian Horse and Garrison Artillery were the first to train at Petawawa Military Camp during the summer of 1905. In 1906 the Royal Canadian Engineers constructed huts, stables and installed water and gas systems. In that same year "A" and "B" Batteries of the Royal Canadian Horse Artillery, commenced the first of many marches to Camp Petawawa for summer training from their permanent station in Kingston, Ontario.

By 1907 combined training and tactical exercises were conducted by various other units such as A and B Squadron, Royal Canadian Dragoons; A and B Batteries, Royal Canadian Horse Artillery; No. 2 Company, Royal Canadian Engineers; a battalion from The Royal Canadian Regiment; and detachments from the Medical and Ordnance Corps.

The first military aircraft flight in Canada took place at Petawawa. On 31 July 1909 under perfect weather conditions, J.A.D. McCurdy and F.W. Baldwin flew the "Silver Dart" at Camp Petawawa in the presence of military observers.

From December 1914 to May 1916, Petawawa was used as an internment camp for 750 German and Austrian prisoners of World War I. Most of these men were civilian internees, the majority of them Ukrainians and other Europeans who came to the Dominion from the Austro-Hungarian Empire, and so were categorized as "enemy aliens" at the outbreak of the war. At the same time Canada Car and Foundry Company had developed three inch shells and were being tested at the camp by Russian artillery. The prisoners, in effect forced labourers, were instrumental in helping clear roads and timber opening up an artillery range and so making these tests possible. From May 1916 to 1918, 10,767 Canadian troops were trained at Petawawa before being sent overseas.

The Garrison is also home to a marked grave of a member of the Chinese Labour Corps, Chou Ming Shan, whom died in transit in France in 1917 and buried at the base. Commonwealth War Graves Commission installed an official grave marker in 2019.

During World War II, three training centres (two artillery and one engineering) were established at Camp Petawawa. In September 1942, 12,515 troops were stationed on the base. The peak load was reached during 1943 when approximately 20,000 troops were undergoing training at one time. As in the previous war, Petawawa was the site of an internment camp. The camp's official designation was Internment Camp No.33; located at Centre Lake it held 645 civilian internees. There were 28 different nationalities, the majority being Italians and Germans identified as enemy aliens.

In 1947, the training of militia and regular units of the Canadian Army resumed. The Royal Canadian Dragoons and 1st Battalion, The Royal Canadian Regiment were moved to Camp Petawawa in 1948. Upon being given the status of a permanent camp, it was officially designated "Camp Petawawa" in May 1951. During the next few years construction continued in order to accommodate more regular units, married quarters and schools for the soldiers' dependents. Units of the Special Force, such as 2 RCHA, 8th Hussars, PPCLI, and 1 RCR earmarked for service in Korea were concentrated at Petawawa before transferring to the United States for departure to the Korean Theatre. The 2nd Canadian Infantry Brigade Group was stationed to Petawawa upon return from Germany in 1959. This formation was redesignated 2 Combat Group in 1966.

The unification of the Canadian Forces resulted in Camp Petawawa being renamed Canadian Forces Base Petawawa (CFB Petawawa) on February 1, 1968. Under the CF, the base was allocated to Mobile Command.

On 1 April 1977, 2 Combat Group was disbanded. 2 Combat Group combined with the Canadian Airborne Regiment at CFB Petawawa to form the Special Service Force. The Special Service Force constituted a unique chapter in Canada's military history. It derived its name from the first Special Service Force, an historic formation of Americans and Canadians which pioneered special forces operations in a brief but immensely successful history during the second world war. The latter-day Special Service Force represented a compromise between the general purpose combat capabilities of a normal brigade and the strategic and tactical flexibility which derived from the lighter and more mobile capabilities of the Canadian Airborne Regiment. Units and soldiers of the Special Service Force served in operations both at home and around the world.

The Special Service Force was officially re-designated as 2 Canadian Mechanized Brigade Group by a Ministerial Order signed on 24 April 1995. This decision to re-organize and re-equip the formation was due to current emphasis in Canadian defence policy on general-purpose capabilities. With a smaller force structure, a smaller defence budget and more frequent operational taskings, it has become clear that general-purpose capabilities provide the best return on Canada's investment in defence. Accordingly, 2 Canadian Mechanized Brigade Group of Petawawa has been designed to be a mirror image of its two sister formations, 1 Canadian Mechanized Brigade Group, based in Edmonton, Alberta and 5 Canadian Mechanized Brigade Group, based in Valcartier, Quebec.

Barracks Building F-16 (constructed in 1953) was designated a Recognized Federal Heritage Building in 1995, due to its association with the efforts of the Canadian Armed Forces to meet Canada's post-World War II international commitments, and due to its modern classicist architecture common among federal buildings of the period.

=== Recent ===
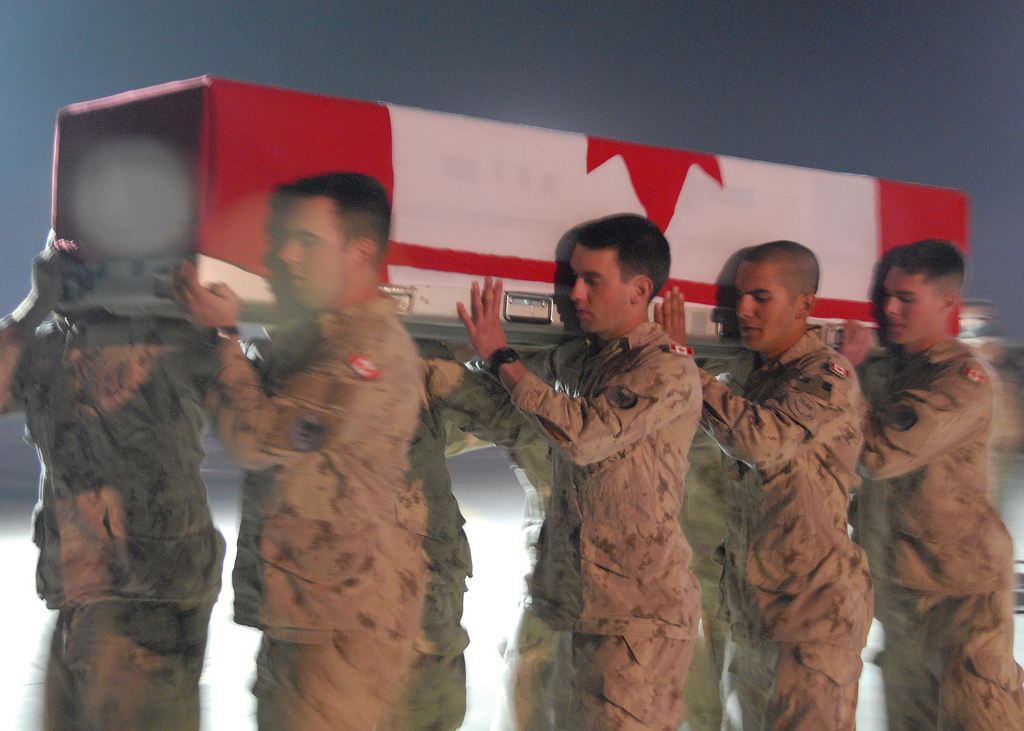
Greenfield, who was deployed with the 24 Field Engineers Squadron of Garrison Petawawa was killed in action

Currently there are approximately 6,100 persons employed at 4 CDSB Petawawa (5,100 of them military) who are included in the units of 2 CMBG, Garrison Petawawa and lodger units. Soldiers at Garrison Petawawa have been involved in many operations throughout the world including tours in Afghanistan and Bosnia.

In 2005, 4 CDSB Petawawa celebrated its first 100 years of service. A number of events were planned in conjunction with units and the local communities to commemorate this special occasion.

In 2021, during the COVID-19 pandemic, the base deployed medical military personnel to Cross Lake, to help organize a response to an outbreak in the Pimicikamak population.

== Current operations ==
Garrison Petawawa is the home of the 4th Canadian Division Support Group and 2 Canadian Mechanized Brigade Group, which is made up of:

- 2 Canadian Mechanized Brigade Group Headquarters & Signal Squadron
- 2nd Regiment, Royal Canadian Horse Artillery
- The Royal Canadian Dragoons
- 1st Battalion, The Royal Canadian Regiment
- 3rd Battalion, The Royal Canadian Regiment
- 2 Combat Engineer Regiment
- 2 Service Battalion

427 Special Operations Aviation Squadron and 450 Tactical Helicopter Squadron are based here and operate their own helipads at Petawawa Heliport located approximately 5 km (3.1 mi) north. They fly the Bell CH-146 Griffon and CH-147F Chinook, respectively. Also located at the base are the Canadian Special Operations Regiment and the Canadian Special Operations Training Centre.

The base motto is, in the eastern Anishinaabe language, endazhe kinamandowa chimaganishak (or fully vocalized as endazhi-gikinoo'amawindowaa zhimaaganishag). The literal English translation is "Training Ground of the Soldiers". The translation used on the base is "Training Ground of the Warriors".

== Garrison Petawawa Museum and the Canadian Airborne Forces Museum ==
Garrison Petawawa Museum and the Canadian Airborne Forces Museum
- Location: Garrison Petawawa, Petawawa, Ontario
- Type: Garrison Petawawa Military Museums
- Website: Garrison Petawawa Museum and the Canadian Airborne Forces Museum

The Garrison Petawawa Museum and the Canadian Airborne Forces Museum feature uniforms, medals, patches, photographs and other Base and Airborne memorabilia. It is open all week 11-4. The museum collects, preserves, and shows, documents, artifacts, photos which illustrate the military life of our base in the city of Petawawa in all aspects of life in peace and in war. The Garrison Petawawa Military Museums "are dedicated to the remembrance of our military past and recognition of the Canadian Armed Forces' service to humanity, through the education of our youth, the fostering of identity, and the nurturing of understanding, the promotion of spirit de corps and the preservation of our collective community heritage." Garrison Petawawa Military Museums are affiliated with CMA, CHIN, and Virtual Museum of Canada.

"INTO ACTION" (1988) by André Gauthier (sculptor) marks the 20th anniversary of the Canadian Airborne Regiment; the sculpture at the entrance to Garrison Petawawa's Airborne Forces Museum depicts a Canadian paratrooper in winter combat gear.
