= Military in Calgary =

Beginning with establishment of Fort Calgary (a North-West Mounted Police fort) in 1875, the city of Calgary, Alberta, has had some degree of permanent military presence throughout its history.

== Early military units ==
Between the time Fort Calgary was established in 1875 and the incorporation of the town of Calgary in 1884, the only formal military presence was the NWMP garrison of Fort Calgary. The Northwest Rebellion prompted the creation of a Citizen's Home Guard consisting of volunteers dressed in cowboy garb who paraded as a show of force for the benefit of local indigenous tribes. No conflicts arose between the European town-dwellers and the First Nations and the guard quietly disbanded.

Calgary's incorporation as a city in 1894 encouraged the development of a more formal military presence. A squadron of the Canadian Mounted Rifles was stationed in Calgary and later a cavalry regiment of the Non-Permanent Active Militia was authorized on 3 July 1905, designated the 15th Light Horse. The regiment used the upper loft of a feed store as a headquarters.

The quartermaster of the 15th Light Horse, who also served on city council, Captain William Charles Gordon Armstrong, made a number of applications to create an infantry regiment. In 1910 his applications were finally accepted and the 103rd Regiment "Calgary Rifles" was formally authorized on 1 April 1910.

Units of the artillery, engineers and supporting corps also had units in Calgary. Strathcona's Horse, a Permanent Force cavalry unit, had one squadron quartered in the city for many years.

== First World War ==
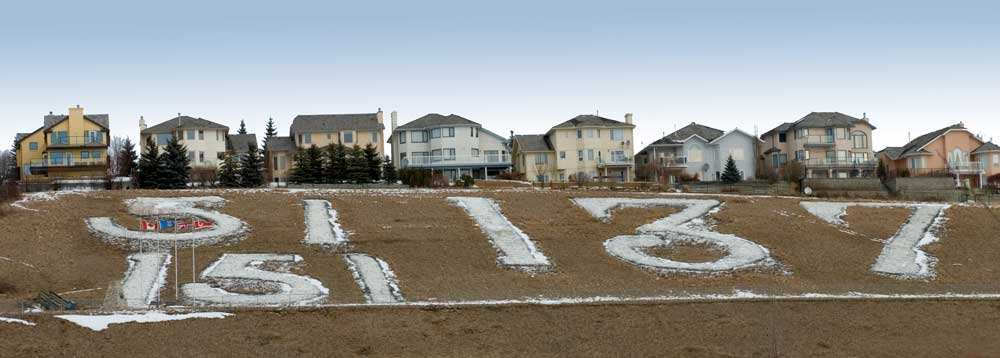
Members of CEF battalions who trained near Signal Hill left a visible mark on the city at Battalion Park

In 1914, several battalions of the Canadian Expeditionary Force were raised in Calgary, notably the 10th and 50th. Training took place at nearby Sarcee Camp, which grew enormously during the First World War. The camp later became known as Sarcee Training Area. Nearby Battalion Park overlooks this area.

== Militia reorganization ==
In 1920–21, the Canadian military was reorganized, and the 103rd Regiment was split into two separate regiments, and by 1939 these were known as The Calgary Highlanders and the Calgary Regiment (Tank). Other supporting units remained in the city as well. By 1939, these included the 15th Alberta Light Horse; 19th Field Brigade, Royal Canadian Artillery (including component subunits 23rd (Howitzer) Battery, 91st Battery, and 95th Battery); 13th Field Company, Royal Canadian Engineers; No. 13 District Signals; and No. 9 Construction Section.

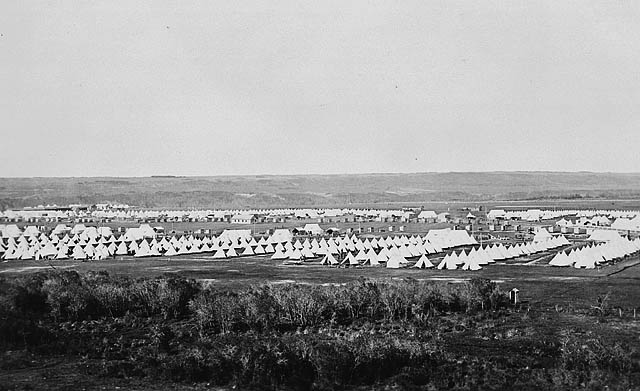
Sarcee Camp in 1915. Public Archives of Canada photo.

== Second World War ==
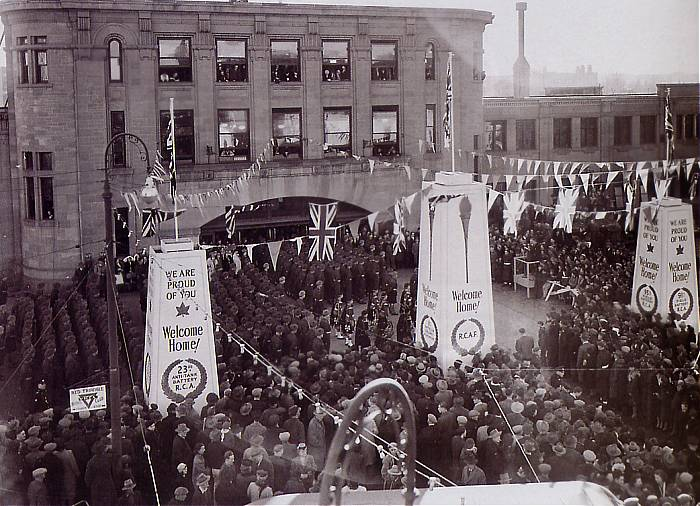
Return of 23rd Anti-Tank Battery, 91st Field Regiment, and The Calgary Highlanders, 24 November 1945.

Beginning on 1 September 1939, many Calgary units mobilized for the Canadian Active Service Force. The Calgary Highlanders mobilized on 1 September 1939 and joined the 2nd Canadian Infantry Division, moving to Shilo, Manitoba, in the summer of 1940 on the way to overseas employment. A 2nd Battalion was raised and served as a part-time Militia unit throughout the war. The Highlanders returned to Calgary on 24 November 1945 to a warm welcome, along with the 23rd Anti-Tank Battery (a component of the 2nd Anti-Tank Regiment) and the 91st Field Battery, Royal Canadian Artillery. The Calgary Regiment (Tank) mobilized in 1941 and eventually served in 1st Canadian Army Tank Brigade (later 1st Canadian Armoured Brigade), most famously serving at Dieppe but later being reconstituted and fighting in Sicily, Italy, and Northwest Europe. A reserve unit remained in Calgary. As well, a contingent of the Alberta University Canadian Officers Training Corps was located in the city.

== Post-war ==
By the end of the Second World War, a greatly enlarged Regular Force saw a sizable military garrison in Calgary, and regular battalions of Princess Patricia's Canadian Light Infantry and the Queen's Own Rifles of Canada, as well as Lord Strathcona's Horse (Royal Canadians), were quartered in the city. In 1995, the Regular Force garrison – including Strathcona's, 1 PPCLI, 1 Service Battalion, 1 Military Police Platoon, and the headquarters of Land Force Western Area as well as 1 Canadian Mechanized Brigade Group – all moved to Edmonton, leaving a skeleton staff of regular personnel in Calgary to administer the local Militia units.

Permanent military facilities were completed in 1917 with the construction of Mewata Armouries, which then housed reserve units and a squadron of regular cavalry. Currie Barracks became an important training base during the Second World War, and many British Commonwealth Air Training Plan facilities were in and around the city, including what is today the Southern Alberta Institute of Technology. Currie Barracks, and nearby Harvey Barracks, were both developed after the war to form Canadian Forces Base Calgary (CFB Calgary). A second armoury was built in a Northeast Calgary industrial park in the 1980s. Harvey Barracks (and the adjacent Sarcee Training Area) were returned to the Tsuu Tʼina Nation after the lease expired, and CFB Calgary was closed. Only the headquarters for a reserve brigade and a small area support unit remain.

== Current units ==
Despite the closing of CFB Calgary (including both the Currie Barracks and Harvey Barracks), the city is still home to a significant military presence of Naval and Army Reserve units including:

- HMCS Tecumseh, a Naval Reserve unit, and HMCS Tecumseh Band at the HMCS Tecumseh Building at 1820 24 Street SW.
- Mewata Armoury, an Army Reserve barracks at 801 11 St SW.
- General Sir Arthur Currie Building, an Army Reserve barracks at 4225 Crowchild Trail SW.

Army Reserve units with their training locations include:

- Headquarters, 41 Canadian Brigade Group at the former CFB Calgary.
- The King's Own Calgary Regiment (RCAC) at the Mewata Armoury.
- Regimental Band of The King's Own Calgary Regiment at The Military Museums.
- 41 Combat Engineer Regiment at the General Sir Arthur Currie Building.
- 41 Signal Regiment, 3 Squadron, at the HMCS Tecumseh building.
- The Calgary Highlanders (10th Canadians) at the Mewata Armoury.
- Regimental Pipes and Drums of The Calgary Highlanders (10th Canadians) at the Mewata Armoury.
- 41 Service Battalion at the former CFB Calgary.
- 15 (Edmonton) Field Ambulance Detachment Calgary (Canadian Forces Health Services Group) at the Mewata Armoury.
- Militia Training Detachment Calgary at the Mewata Armoury.

Army, Air Force and Navy Regular Force elements are stationed at:

- CFRC Calgary at 700 6 Avenue SW.
- The Military Museums at 4520 Crowchild Trail SW.

Additionally, there are several corps of the Royal Canadian Army Cadets, Royal Canadian Sea Cadets, Navy League of Canada and several squadrons of the Royal Canadian Air Cadets who train at various facilities.

These cadet corps and squadrons consist of:

- 2554 PPCLI RCACC.
- 1292 LdSH RCACC.
- 2137 Calg Highrs RCACC.
- 2383 Calg Highrs (High River) RCACC.
- 3016 Calg Highrs (Airdrie) RCACC.
- 3125 Calg Highrs (Chestermere) RCACC.
- 1955 Svc. Bat RCACC.
- 2512 KOCR RCACC.
- 2059 Signals RCACC.

- 52 City of Calgary RCACS.
- 88 Airdrie Lynx RCACS.
- 187 High River RCACS.
- 538 Buffalo RCACS.
- 604 Moose RCACS.
- 781 Calgary RCACS.
- 903 Strathmore RCACS.
- 952 Westjet RCACS.
- 83 Juno Beach RCACS.
- 918 Griffon RCACS
- 22 Undaunted RCSCC.
- 335 Calgary RCSCC.
- 344 Victoria RCSCC.
- 359 Chicoutimi RCSCC.
- 360 Erratic RCSCC.
- 21 Capt. Jackson NLCC.
- 166 John A. Hamilton NLCC.
- 205 Cdr W.H. Evelyn NLCC.
- 219 Holger Storm NLCC.

== Notable Calgarians in the Canadian military ==
- Ian Bazalgette: awarded a posthumous Victoria Cross in 1944 for actions as a Bomber Command pilot of the Royal Canadian Air Force.
- Robert Hampton Gray, Royal Canadian Naval Volunteer Reserve at HMCS Tecumseh, the only person in the Canadian Navy and the last Canadian to be awarded the Victoria Cross.
- John George Pattison: awarded the Victoria Cross for actions with the 50th Battalion, Canadian Expeditionary Force at Vimy Ridge in 1917.
- R.B. Bennett: Prime Minister of Canada and also long-time honorary colonel of The Calgary Highlanders.
- Douglas Harkness: commander of an anti-tank battery of the Royal Canadian Artillery in the Second World War, and later Minister of National Defence.
- Mark Tennant: rose from the rank of private in 1939 to major with the Calgary Highlanders during the Second World War and later served several terms as an Alderman of the City of Calgary.

== See also ==
- CFB Calgary
- RCAF Station Calgary
- The Military Museums
- Calgary Soldiers' Memorial
