= Senior officer =

Category of military officers, above junior officer ranks

A senior officer is an officer of a more senior grade in military or other uniformed services. In military organisations, the term may refer to any officer above junior officer rank, but usually specifically refers to the middle-ranking group of commissioned officers above junior officer ranks but below flag, general or air rank. In most countries, this includes the ranks of lieutenant commander/major/squadron leader, commander/lieutenant colonel/wing commander and naval captain/colonel/group captain, or their equivalents. In some countries, it also includes brigadiers and commodores.

Sometimes, particularly in the army, this grade is referred to as field-grade officers, field officers or officers of field rank. Historically, a regiment or battalion's field officers made up its command element.

== Canada ==
In the Canadian Armed Forces, the term "senior officer" (French: officier supérieur) is used in all three services. It includes the army and air force ranks of major, lieutenant-colonel, and colonel, and the naval ranks of lieutenant-commander, commander, and captain.

== France ==
In the French Armed Forces, senior officers are called officiers supérieurs. They include the army and air force ranks of commandant, lieutenant-colonel and colonel, and the naval ranks of capitaine de corvette, capitaine de frégate and capitaine de vaisseau.

== Germany ==
In the German Bundeswehr, officers of the rank of Major, Oberstleutnant and Oberst in the Heer (army) and Luftwaffe (air force), and Korvettenkapitän, Fregattenkapitän and Kapitän zur See in the German Navy are traditionally known as Stabsoffiziere (English: staff officers).

== Russia ==
Shtabofitser (Russian: Штаб-офицер), derived from the German stabsoffizier, was the designation of the following officers of the Russian Imperial Army and Navy until 1917.

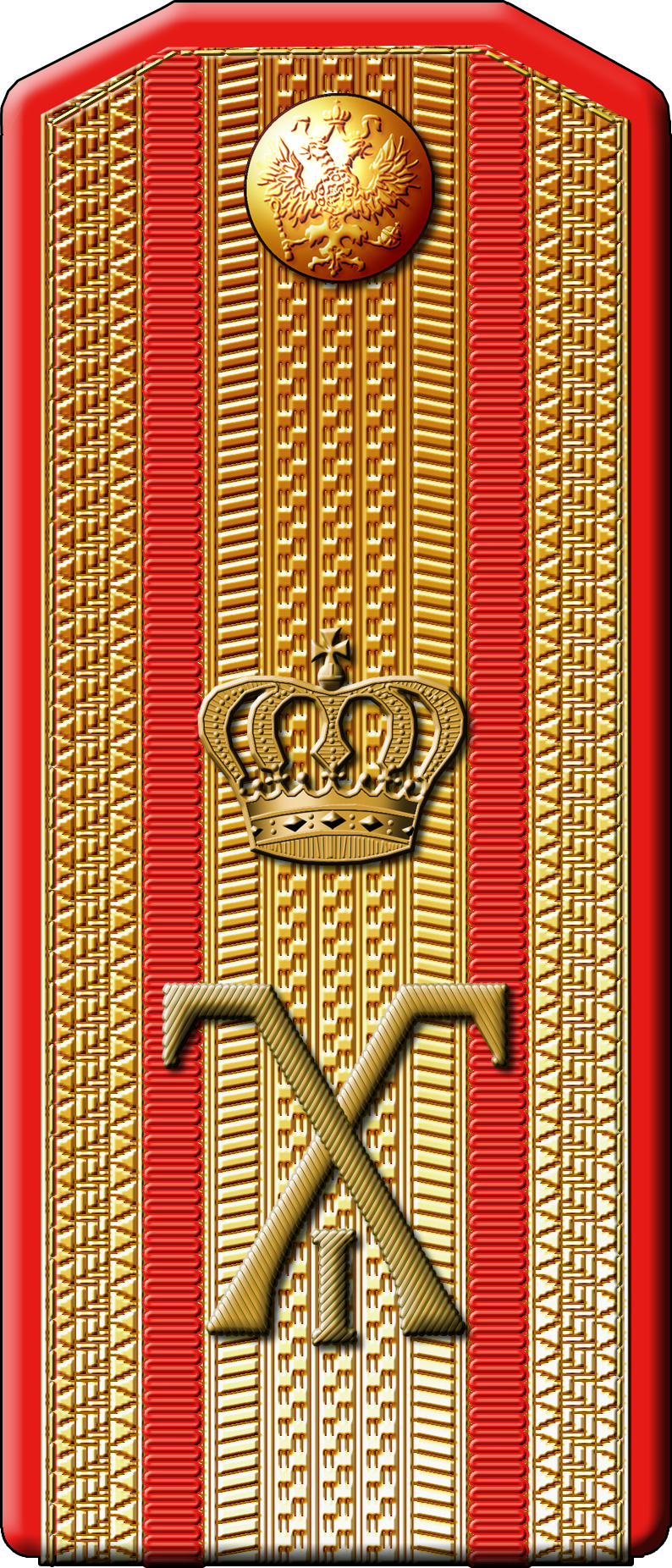
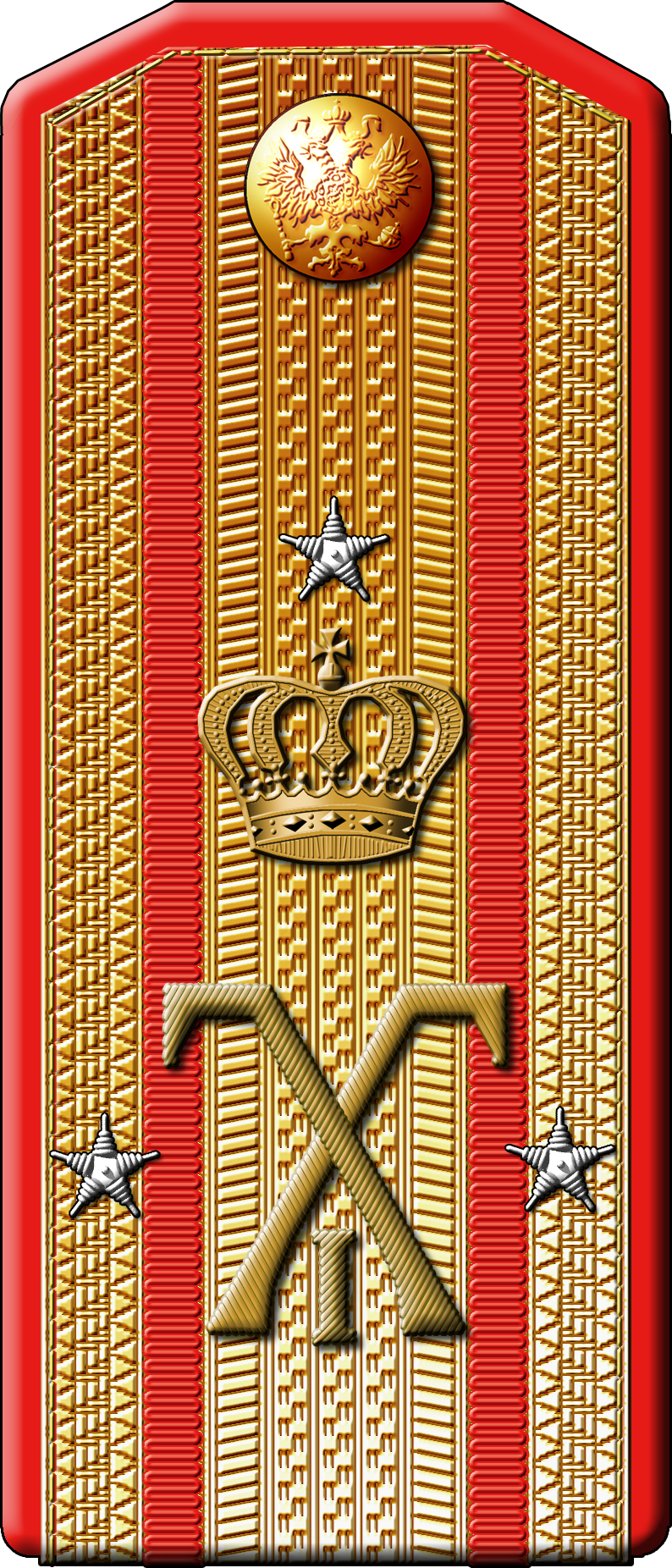
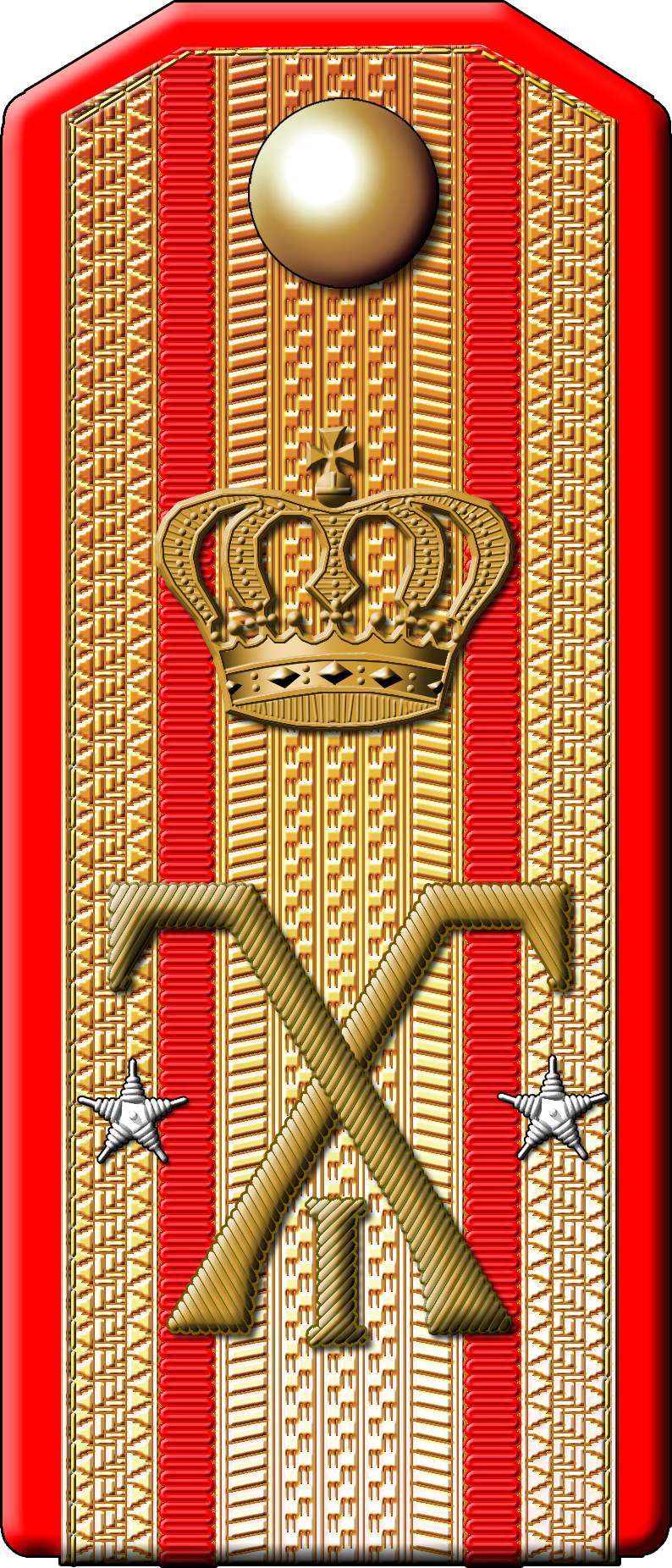
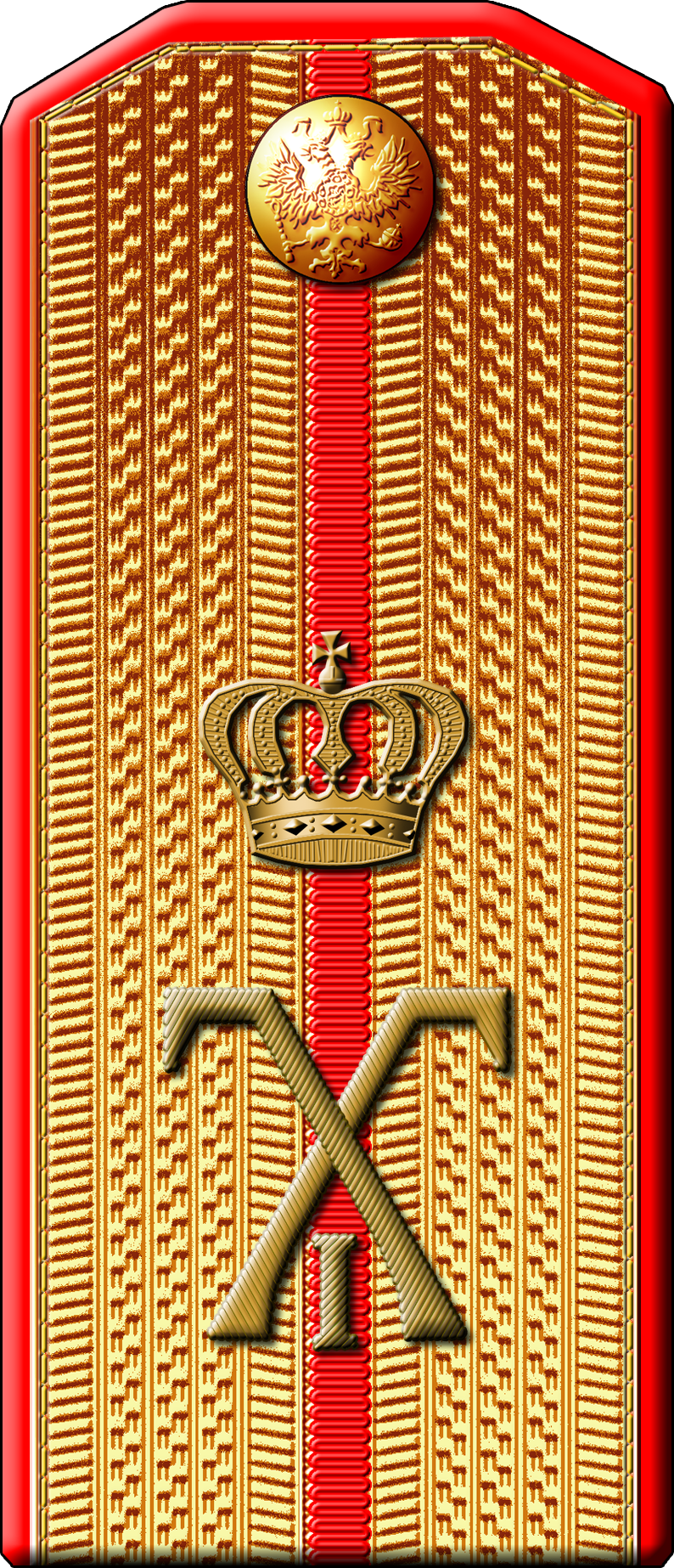
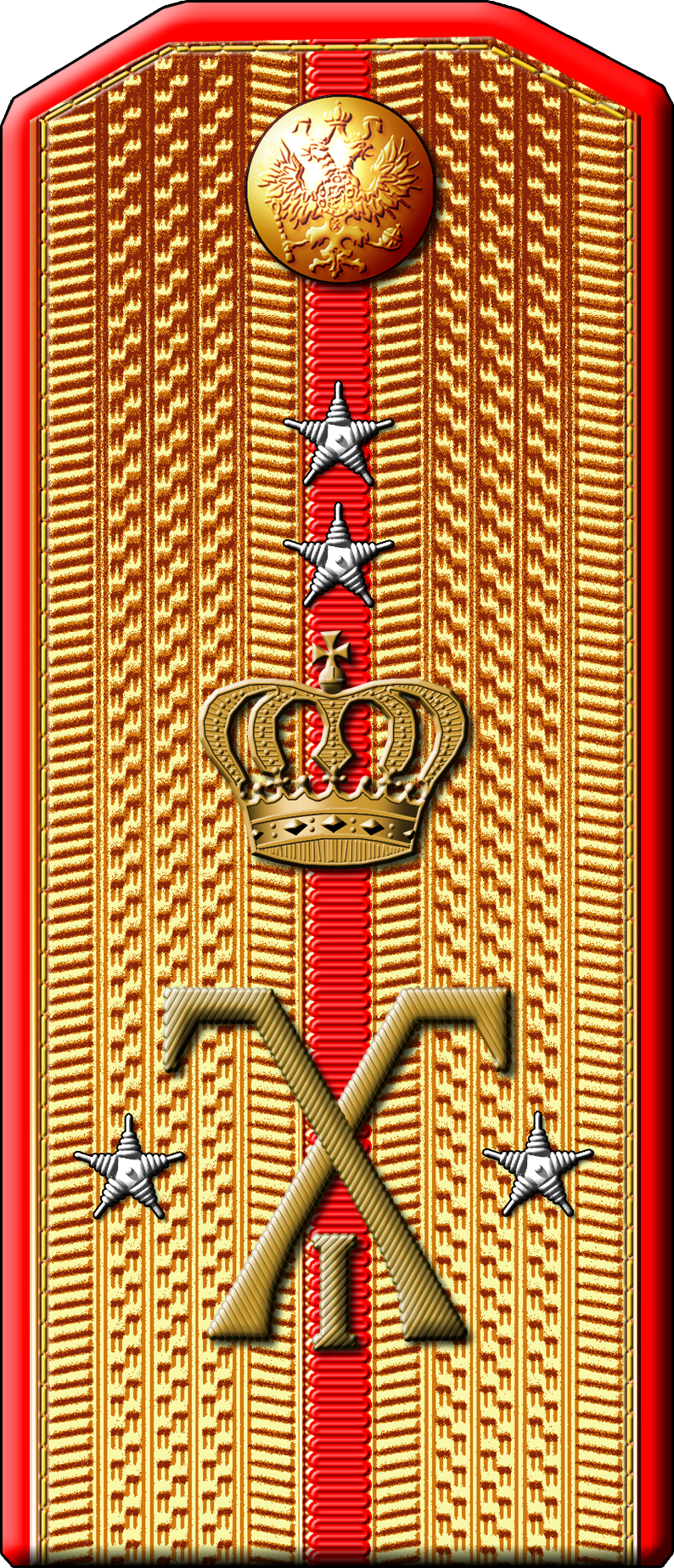
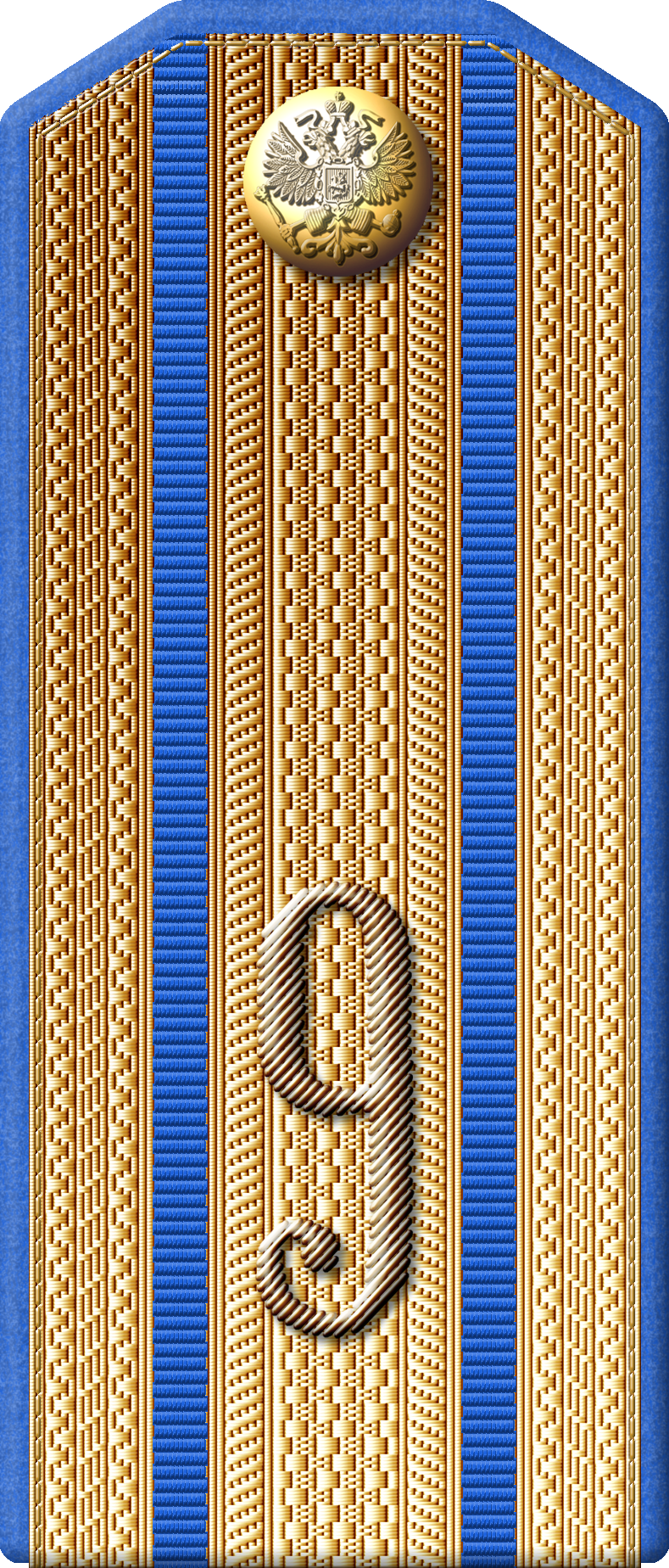
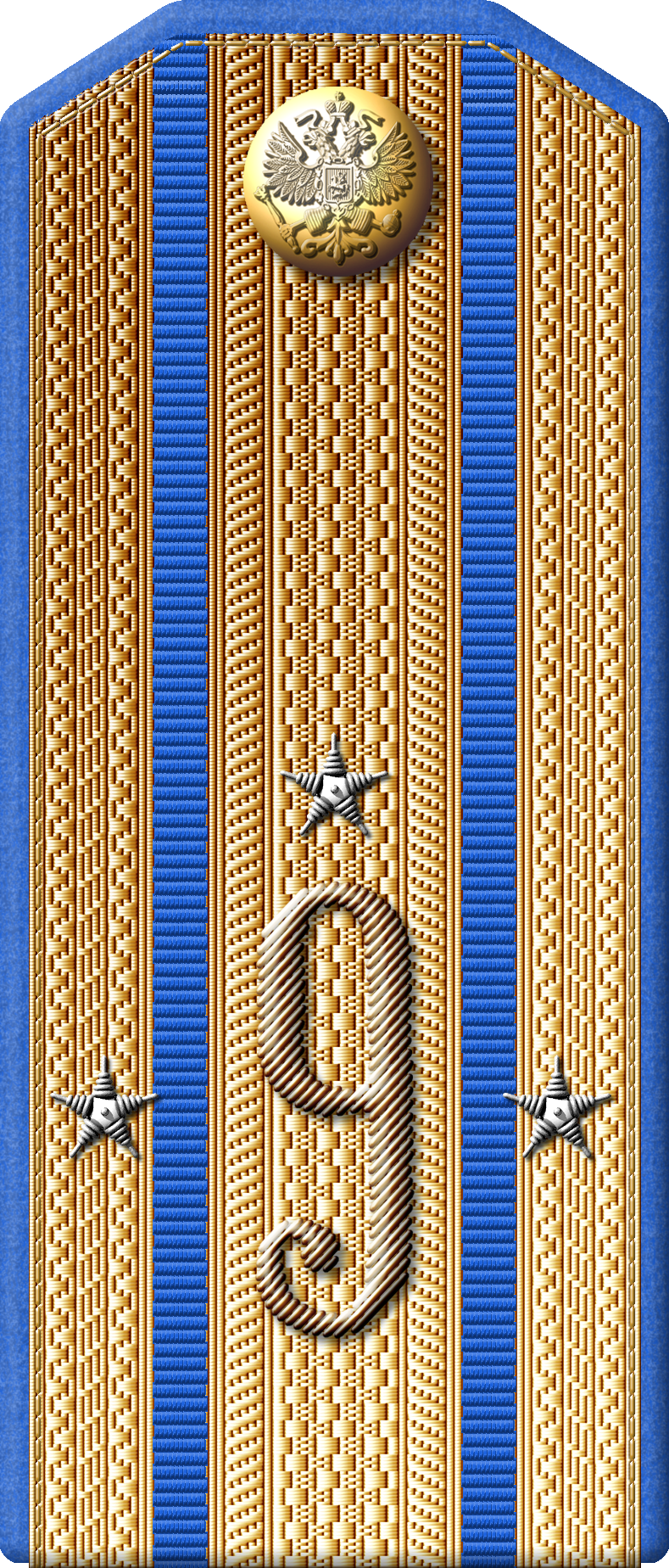
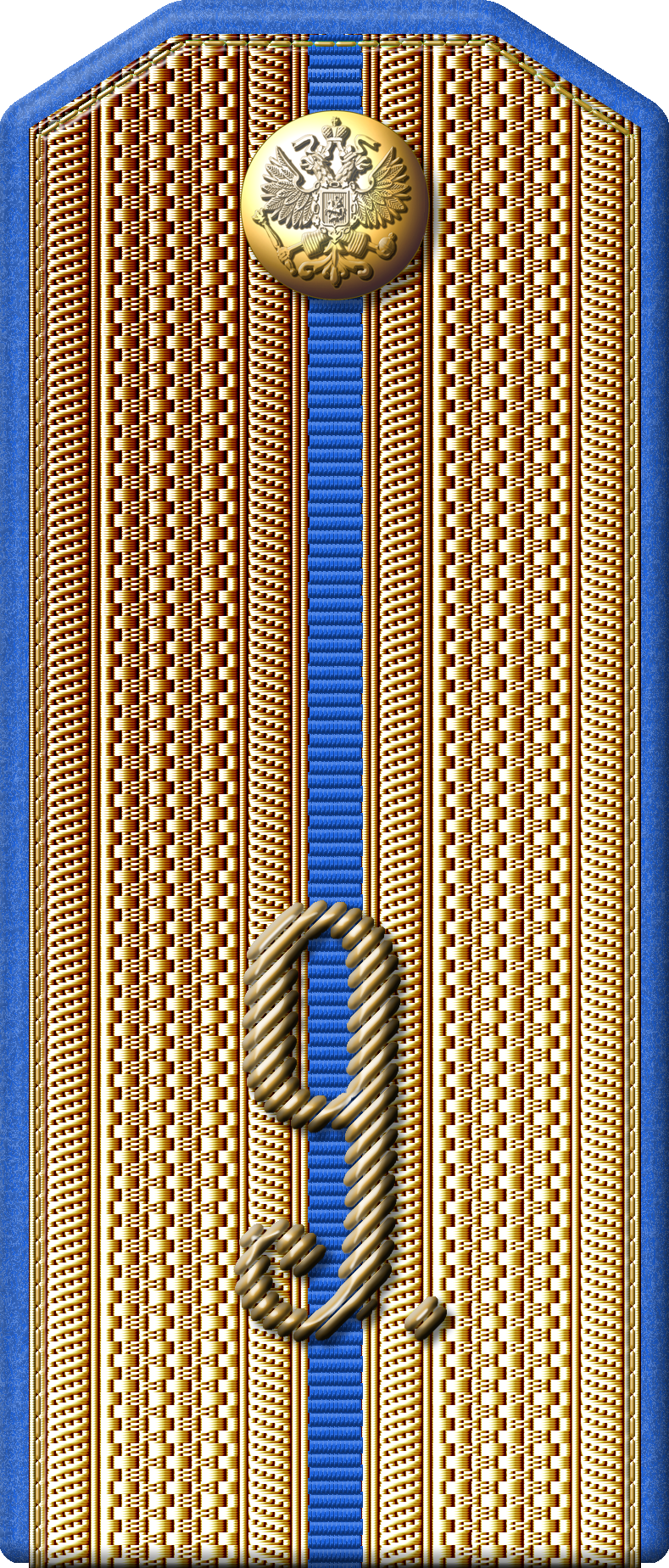
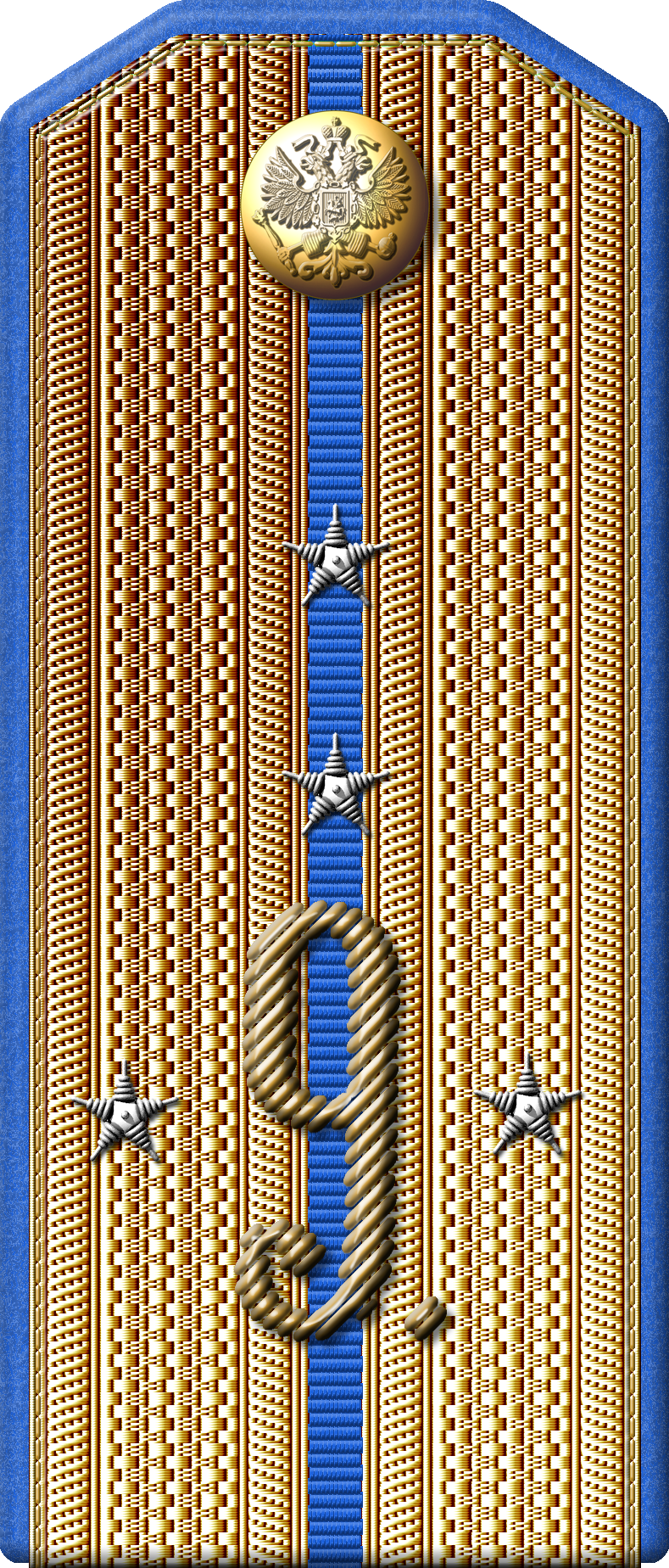
Rank group	Field officers (Russian: Штаб-офицеры, romanized: Shtabofitsery)
Nevsky 1st Infantry Regiment
Ivanogorodsky 99th IR
	Полковник; Polkovnik	Подполко́вник; Podpolkovnik	Майо́р; Major	Капитан; Kapitan	Штабс-капитан; Stabs-kapitan

== United Kingdom and Commonwealth ==
The British Army and Royal Marines use the terms "officers of field rank" or "field officers" to refer to the ranks of major, lieutenant colonel, colonel and brigadier. The term "senior officer" is used for the ranks of lieutenant commander, commander, captain and commodore in the Royal Navy, and squadron leader, wing commander and group captain in the Royal Air Force. An RAF air commodore, however, is considered to be an air officer.

A number of other armed forces in the Commonwealth, including Australia and New Zealand, also follow this pattern.

== United States ==
The officer group in United States Armed Forces has two different names depending on the branch. In the Army, Marine Corps, Air Force, and Space Force the rank group is called field grade and consists of major, lieutenant colonel, and colonel. In the Navy, and Coast Guard, the rank group is called mid-grade and consists of lieutenant commander, commander, and captain.
