= Lieutenant commander =

Commissioned officer rank

Lieutenant commander (also hyphenated lieutenant-commander and abbreviated Lt Cdr, LtCdr., LCDR, or LCdr) is a commissioned officer rank in many navies and maritime organizations. The rank is superior to a lieutenant and subordinate to a commander. The corresponding rank in most armies and air forces is major, and in the Royal Air Force and other Commonwealth air forces is squadron leader. It is roughly equivalent to the Corvette Captain rank in central European countries and the Captain 3rd rank rank in eastern European/CIS countries.

The NATO rank code is mostly OF-3.

A Lieutenant Commander is a department officer or the executive officer (second-in-command) on many warships and smaller shore installations, or the commanding officer of a smaller ship/installation. They are also department officers in naval aviation squadrons.

== Protocol ==
In the British Armed Forces, United States Navy and Commonwealth Militaries, officers are addressed by their full rank if their full name is being used, or the higher grade of the rank if the officer is being addressed or referred to in shorthand. Therefore, just as Lieutenant Colonel Susan White would be “Colonel White”, or Vice Admiral Horatio Nelson is “Admiral Nelson”, so Lieutenant Commander John Smith is addressed as "Commander" or "Commander Smith", and referred to as "Commander Smith".

Famous examples of this are:

- Lieutenant Commander Lionel Crabb Royal Navy who in conversation, biopics, Admiralty correspondence and even statements in Parliament by the Prime Minister is almost invariably referred to as “Commander Crabb”.

- Acting Temporary Lieutenant Commander Ewen Montagu RNVR, who is routinely referred to as "Commander Montagu" in historical and contemporary records, and in interviews by his colleagues on Operation Mincemeat.

== Origins ==
Lieutenants were commonly put in command of smaller vessels not warranting a commander or captain. Such a lieutenant was called a "lieutenant commanding" or "lieutenant commandant" in the United States Navy, and a "lieutenant in command", "lieutenant and commander", or "senior lieutenant" in the Royal Navy. The USN settled on "lieutenant commander" in 1862 and made it a distinct rank. The RN followed suit in March 1914.

== Canada ==
In the Royal Canadian Navy, the rank of lieutenant-commander (LCdr) is the naval rank equal to major in the army or air force and is the first senior officer rank. Lieutenant commanders are senior to lieutenants (N) and to army and air force captains, and are junior to commanders and lieutenant colonels.

== United Kingdom ==
=== Royal Navy ===
The insignia worn by a Royal Navy lieutenant commander is two medium gold braid stripes with one thin gold stripe running in between, placed upon a navy blue/black background. The top stripe has the ubiquitous loop used in all RN officer rank insignia, except for the rank of Midshipman. The RAF follows this pattern with its equivalent rank of squadron leader.

Having fewer officer ranks than the army, the RN previously split some of its ranks by seniority (time in rank) to provide equivalence: hence a lieutenant with fewer than eight years seniority wore two stripes, and ranked with an army captain; a lieutenant of eight years or more wore two stripes with a thinner one in between, and ranked with a major. This distinction was ostensibly abolished when the rank of lieutenant commander was introduced, although promotion to the latter rank for officers on a full career commission (FCC) was automatic following accumulation of eight years' seniority as a lieutenant. Automatic promotion officially ceased in the early 21st century and promotion is ostensibly now only awarded on merit.

=== Royal Observer Corps ===
Throughout much of its existence, the British Royal Observer Corps (ROC) maintained a rank of observer lieutenant commander. The ROC wore a Royal Air Force uniform and their rank insignia appeared similar to that of an RAF squadron leader except that the stripes were shown entirely in black. Prior to the renaming, the rank had been known as observer lieutenant (first class).

== United States ==
In the United States, the rank of lieutenant commander exists in the United States Navy, United States Coast Guard, United States Public Health Service Commissioned Corps, and National Oceanic and Atmospheric Administration Commissioned Officer Corps.

Within the U.S. Navy, lieutenant commanders are technically listed as junior officers, though in practice they typically hold positions with levels of responsibility akin to mid-grade/field officers. There are two insignia used by U.S. Navy and U.S. Coast Guard lieutenant commanders. On service khakis and all working uniforms, lieutenant commanders wear a gold oak leaf collar device, similar to the ones worn by majors in the United States Air Force and United States Army, and identical to that worn by majors in the United States Marine Corps. In all dress uniforms, they wear sleeve braid or shoulder boards bearing a single gold quarter-inch stripe between two gold half-inch strips (nominal size). Above or inboard of the stripes, they wear their speciality insignia (i.e., a star for officers of the line, single oak leaf for medical with silver acorn for Medical Corps, crossed oak leaves for Civil Engineer Corps, United States shield for the Coast Guard, etc.) The Uniformed Services of the United States designate the rank as O-4.

== Gallery ==
Lieutenant commander
(Antigua and Barbuda Coast Guard)

Lieutenant commander
(Royal Australian Navy)

Lieutenant commander
(Royal Bahamas Defence Force)

Lieutenant commander
(Bangladesh Navy)

Lieutenant commander
(Barbados Coast Guard)

Lieutenant commander
(Belize Coast Guard)

Leftenan komander
(Royal Brunei Navy)

Lieutenant-commander
(French: Capitaine de corvette)
(Royal Canadian Navy)

Kaptajnløjtnant
(Royal Danish Navy)

ሌፍተናንት ኮማንደር
Lēfitenaniti komanideri
(Ethiopian Navy)

Lieutenant commander
(Republic of Fiji Navy)

Lieutenant commander
(Gambian Navy)

Lieutenant commander
(Ghana Navy)

Lieutenant commander
(Guyanese Coast Guard)

Lieutenant commander
(Indian Navy)

Lieutenant commander
(Irish: Lefteanant-cheannasaí)
(Irish Naval Service)

Lieutenant commander
(Jamaican Coast Guard)

Komandleitnants
(Latvian Naval Forces)

Lieutenant commander
(Liberian National Coast Guard)

Komandoras leitenantas
(Lithuanian Naval Force)

Leftenan komander
(Royal Malaysian Navy)

Lieutenant commander
(Namibian Navy)

Lieutenant commander
(Royal New Zealand Navy)

Lieutenant commander
(Nigerian Navy)

Lieutenant commander
(Pakistan Navy)

Lieutenant commander
(Papua New Guinea Maritime Element)

Komandor porucznik
(Polish Navy)

Locotenent-comandor
(Romanian Naval Forces)

Lieutenant commander
(Saint Kitts and Nevis Coast Guard)

Lieutenant commander
(Sierra Leone Navy)

Lieutenant commander
(South African Navy)

Lieutenant commander
(Sri Lanka Navy)

Lieutenant commander
(Tanzania Naval Command)

Lieutenant commander
(Tongan Maritime Force)

Lieutenant commander
(Trinidad and Tobago Coast Guard)

Lieutenant commander
(Royal Navy)

Lieutenant commander
(United States Navy)

Lieutenant commander
(United States Coast Guard)

Lieutenant commander
(NOAA Commissioned Officer Corps and United States Public Health Service Commissioned Corps)

Lieutenant commander
(Vanuatu Maritime Wing)
