= 41 Canadian Brigade Group =

Brigade of the Canadian Army

- 41^{e} Groupe-brigade du Canada (French)
- 41 CBG badge
- Active: 1 April 1997 – present
- Country: Canada
- Branch: Canadian Army
- Type: Brigade group
- Part of: 2nd Canadian Division
- Garrison/HQ: LGen Stan Waters Building, Calgary
- Nickname: "Alberta's Brigade"
- Motto: Fortune Favours the Bold
- March: "Alberta Bound"
- Website: canada.ca/en/army/corporate/3-canadian-division/41-canadian-brigade-group.html

Commanders
- Commander: Colonel Kyle Clapperton, CD
- Deputy Commander: Lieutenant-Colonel Steven Flavel, CD
- Brigade Sergeant Major: Chief Warrant Officer Ted Coderre, CD

Insignia
NATO Map Symbol
41
2

41 Canadian Brigade Group (41 CBG; French: 41^{e} Groupe-brigade du Canada) is a Canadian Army formation of the 2nd Canadian Division. The formation is composed of Army Reserve units within the province of Alberta and the Northwest Territories. The headquarters of the brigade is in Calgary.

The brigade has an establishment of 2,500 all ranks. The role of the Army Reserve is to be "a professional part-time force that provides local engagement and a responsive integrated capability, at home or abroad, in sustainment of the Army mission." Most of the soldiers within the brigade serve part time in units or sub-units stationed in their communities. As the Canadian Army generates task-specific units for employment on expeditionary and domestic operations under the command of the Canadian Joint Operations Command, 41 CBG, as a force generator, is tasked with the following:

1. On order provide general-purpose, combat-capable soldiers and specialist sub-subunits (troops or platoons) capable of augmenting the Regular Force on expeditionary operations; and
2. On order provide a domestic response unit (Territorial Battalion Group), sub-units (Direct Response Companies), or sub-sub-units (Direct Response Platoons or Local Response Platoons) capable of augmenting the Regular Force on domestic operations.

== Corporate identity ==
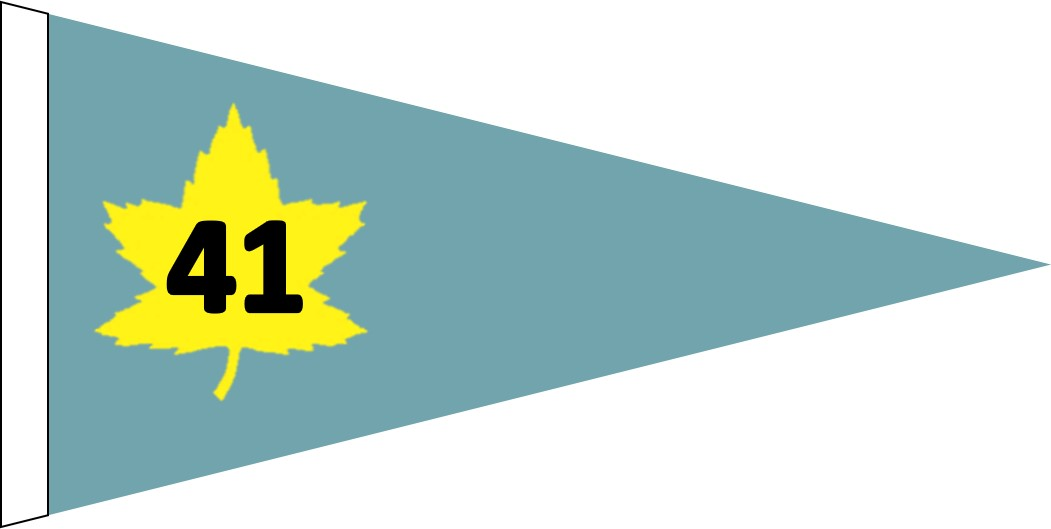
Commander's pennant

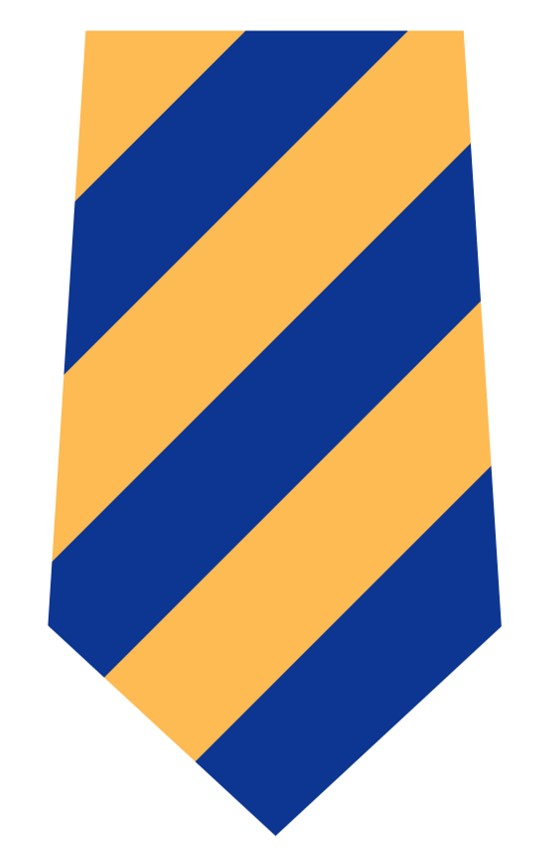
Brigade necktie

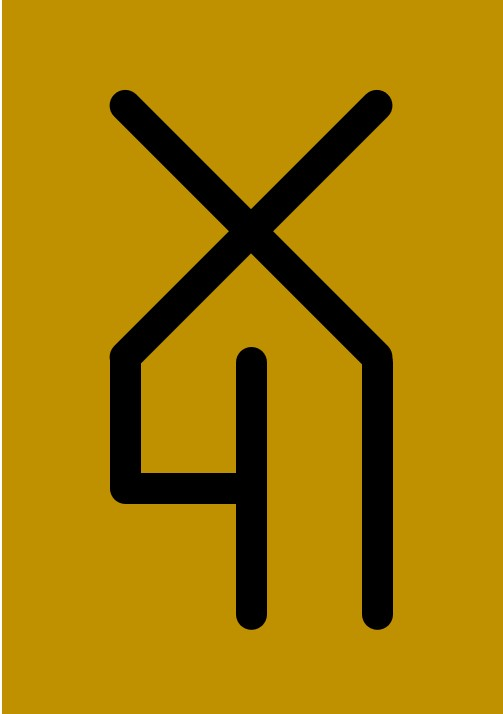
Brigade brand

== Brigade units ==
Cities with 41 CBG units

| Unit | Role | Locations |
|---|---|---|
| 41 Canadian Brigade Group Headquarters | Headquarters | Calgary |
| The South Alberta Light Horse | Armoured Reconnaissance | Regimental Headquarters (Medicine Hat); A Squadron (Medicine Hat and Lethbridge); B Squadron (Edmonton); Headquarters Squadron (Medicine Hat and Edmonton) |
| The King's Own Calgary Regiment (RCAC) | Armoured Reconnaissance | Regimental Headquarters (Calgary); A Squadron (Calgary); B Squadron (Calgary); Headquarters Squadron (Calgary) |
| 20th Field Regiment, RCA | Artillery | Regimental Headquarters (Edmonton); 61st Field Battery (Edmonton); 78th Field Battery (Red Deer); Headquarters Battery (Edmonton and Red Deer) |
| 20th Independent Field Battery, RCA | Artillery | Lethbridge |
| 41 Combat Engineer Regiment, RCE | Combat engineering | Regimental Headquarters (Edmonton); 25 Engineer Squadron (Edmonton); 33 Engineer Squadron (Calgary); Headquarters Squadron (Edmonton and Calgary) |
| 41 Signal Regiment, RC Sigs | Communications | Regimental Headquarters (Edmonton); 1 Signal Squadron (Edmonton); 2 Signal Squadron (Red Deer); 3 Signal Squadron (Calgary); Headquarters Squadron (Edmonton, Red Deer, Calgary) |
| The Loyal Edmonton Regiment | Light infantry | Battalion Headquarters (Edmonton); A Company (Edmonton); B Company (Edmonton); C Company (Yellowknife); Headquarters Company (Edmonton) |
| The Calgary Highlanders (10th Canadians) | Light infantry | Battalion Headquarters (Calgary); A Company (Calgary); B Company (Calgary); Headquarters Company (Calgary) |
| 41 Service Battalion | Service and support | Battalion Headquarters (Calgary); 14 Service Company (Calgary); 15 Service Company (Edmonton); Headquarters Company (Calgary and Edmonton) |
| 15 (Edmonton) Field Ambulance | Medical (attached to 41 Canadian Brigade Group under Operational Control from 1 Health Services Group) | Edmonton and Calgary |

== History ==
There are two constants in the organization of the institution that is the Canadian Army, the "Army Headquarters" and the "Units". For effective and efficient intermediate command and control, formations such as corps, areas, divisions, districts, brigades and brigade groups were routinely organized, redesignated, reorganized, or disbanded as required. 41 Canadian Brigade Group is but the latest incarnation of the following fifteen Militia formations that have commanded the Alberta-based Army Reserve units since 1910:

1. 5th Cavalry Brigade (1910–1912)
  - Headquartered in Calgary
  - Units under command:
    - 15th Light Horse
    - 19th Alberta Mounted Rifles (redesignated to 19th Alberta Dragoons in 1911)
    - 21st Alberta Hussars, and (left the brigade in 1911)
    - 23rd Alberta Rangers
    - 25th Battery, C.F.A. (joined the brigade in 1911)
    - 4th Field Troop, C.E. (joined the brigade in 1911)
    - No. 14 Company, C.A.S.C. (joined the brigade in 1911)
    - No. 17 Cavalry Field Ambulance (joined the brigade in 1911)
2. 5th Mounted Brigade (1912–1936)
  - Headquartered in Calgary (1912–1919, 1928–1930), Edmonton (1920–1927, 1931–1934), Pincher Creek (1935–1936)
  - Units under command:
    - 15th Light Horse (redesignated 15th Canadian Light Horse in 1922)
    - South Alberta Horse (joined brigade in 1931, left the brigade in 1932)
    - 19th Alberta Dragoons
    - 23rd Alberta Rangers (left the brigade in 1922)
    - 25th Battery, C.F.A. (left the brigade in 1922)
    - 5th Cavalry Brigade Ammunition Column (redesignated 5th Mounted Brigade Ammunition Column – Between 1919 and 1922)
    - 4th Field Troop, C.E. (left the brigade 1922)
    - Wireless Telegraph Detachment, C.E. (left the brigade 1922)
    - No. 14 Company, C.A.S.C. (left the brigade 1922)
    - No. 17 Cavalry Field Ambulance (left the brigade 1922)
    - The Alberta Mounted Rifles (joined the brigade in 1922)
3. 24th Infantry Brigade (1922–1936)
  - Headquartered in Calgary
  - Units under command:
    - 1st Battalion, The Edmonton Regiment (left the brigade in 1923 to join 29th Infantry Brigade)
    - 2nd Battalion, The Edmonton Regiment (left the brigade in 1923 to join 29th Infantry Brigade)
    - 1st Battalion, The Calgary Regiment (redesignated to 1st Battalion, Calgary Highlanders, The Calgary Regiment in 1921 and expanded to regimental status 1924)
    - 2nd Battalion, The Calgary Regiment (expanded to regimental status in 1924)
    - 1st Battalion, The Alberta Regiment (redesignated to The South Alberta Regiment in 1924)
    - 2nd Battalion, The Alberta Regiment (left the brigade in 1923 to join 29th Infantry Brigade)
  - Disbanded effective 14 December 1936 under General Order 73/1937 dated 29 April 1937#
4. 29th Infantry Brigade (1923–1936)
  - Headquartered in Edmonton
  - Units under command:
    - 1st Battalion, The Edmonton Regiment (redesignated as the Edmonton Regiment in 1924)
    - 2nd Battalion, The Edmonton Regiment (redesignated as the Edmonton Fusiliers in 1924)
    - 2nd Battalion, The Alberta Regiment (redesignated as the North Alberta Regiment in 1924)
  - Disbanded effective 14 December 1936 under General Order 73/1937 dated 29 April 1937
5. 2nd (Reserve) Cavalry Brigade (1936–1946)
  - Organized effective 15 December 1936 under General Order 71/1937 dated 29 April 1937
  - Headquartered in Pincher Creek (1936–1938) Chauvin, Alberta (1939-42)
  - Units under command:
    - 15th Alberta Light Horse
    - 19th Alberta Dragoons
  - Disbanded on 31 March 1946 under General Order 113/46 dated 13 May 1946
6. 3rd (Reserve) Infantry Brigade (1936–1946)
  - Headquartered in Calgary
  - Units under command:
    - The South Alberta Regiment
    - The Edmonton Fusiliers
    - The Edmonton Regiment
    - The Calgary Highlanders
    - The Calgary Regiment (attached)
  - Reorganized and redesignated to 18th Infantry Brigade effective 1 April 1946 under General Order 116/46 dated 13 May 1946
7. 41st (Reserve) Brigade Group (1942–1946)
  - Formed on 1 April 1942
  - Headquartered in Edmonton until 1 April 1943 then Calgary
  - Units under command:
    - 14th (Reserve) Armoured Regiment, RCAC (Calgary Regiment)
    - 29th (Reserve) Reconnaissance Regiment, RCAC (South Alberta Regiment)
    - 41st (Reserve) Field Regiment, R.C.A.
    - 13th (Reserve) Field Company, R.C.E.
    - E and J sections, No.13 (Reserve) District Signals, R.C.C.S.
    - 4th (Reserve) Armoured Divisional Signals, R.C.C.S.
    - 2nd (Reserve) Battalion, The Edmonton Fusiliers
    - 2nd (Reserve) Battalion, The Calgary Highlanders
    - 2nd (Reserve) Battalion, The Edmonton Regiment
    - No.2 Group, No.10 (Reserve) Divisional Workshop, R.C.O.C.
    - No.41 (Reserve) Light Aid Detachment (Type A), R.C.O.C.
    - No.42 (Reserve) Light Aid Detachment (Type B), R.C.O.C.
    - No.43 (Reserve) Light Aid Detachment (Type B), R.C.O.C.
    - No.44 (Reserve) Light Aid Detachment (Type B), R.C.O.C.
    - No.8 (Reserve) Field Ambulance, R.C.A.M.C.
  - Disbanded on 30 January 1946 under General Order 86/1946 dated 2 April 1946
8. 18th Infantry Brigade (1946–1954)
  - Organized effective 15 December 1936 under General Order 73/1937 dated 29 April 1937
  - Headquartered in Edmonton
  - Reorganized and redesignated from 3rd (Reserve) Infantry Brigade to 18th Infantry Brigade effective 1 April 1946 under General Order 116/46 dated 13 May 1946#
9. 22 Militia Group (1954–1965)
  - Headquartered in Calgary
  - Units under command:
    - The South Alberta Light Horse
    - The King's Own Calgary Regiment (RCAC)
    - 18th Field Regiment, RCA
    - 19th Medium Regiment, RCA
    - 8th Field Engineer Regiment, RCE
    - 7th Independent Signals Squadron, RCCS
    - The Calgary Highlanders
    - 7th Column, R.C.A.S.C.
    - 21st Medical Company, R.C.A.M.C.
    - 59th Dental Unit, R.C.D.C.
    - 6th Ordnance Company, R.C.O.C.
    - 9th Technical Regiment, R.C.E.M.E.
10. 23 Militia Group (1954–1965)
  - Headquartered in Wainwright
11. Alberta Militia District (1965–1968)
12. Northern Alberta Militia District (1968–1991)
  - Headquartered in Edmonton
  - Units under command:
    - 20th Field Regiment, RCA
    - 18th Air Defence Regiment, RCA
    - 8th Field Engineer Regiment, RCE
    - The Loyal Edmonton Regiment
    - 15th (Edmonton) Service Battalion
13. Southern Alberta Militia District (1968–1991)
  - Headquartered in Calgary
  - Units under command:
    - The South Alberta Light Horse
    - The King's Own Calgary Regiment (RCAC)
    - 18th Air Defence Regiment, RCA
    - 33rd Field Engineer Squadron, RCE
    - The Calgary Highlanders
    - 14th (Calgary) Service Battalion
14. Alberta District (1991–1997)
  - Headquartered in Calgary
  - Units under command:
    - The South Alberta Light Horse
    - The King's Own Calgary Regiment (RCAC)
    - 20th Field Regiment, RCA
    - 18th Air Defence Regiment, RCA
    - 8th Field Engineer Regiment, RCE
    - 33rd Field Engineer Squadron, RCE
    - The Loyal Edmonton Regiment
    - The Calgary Highlanders
    - 14th (Calgary) Service Battalion
    - 15th (Edmonton) Service Battalion
15. 41 Canadian Brigade Group (1997–Present)

== Past commanders of Alberta's Militia formations ==
- 5th Cavalry Brigade
  - Colonel J. Walker (1910–11)
  - Colonel R. Belcher, C.M.G. (1911–12)
- 5th Mounted Brigade
  - Colonel R. Belcher, C.M.G. (1912–19)
  - Colonel (later Brigadier-General) W.A. Griesbach, C.B., C.M.G., D.S.O. (1919–23)
  - Colonel C.Y. Weaver, D.S.O. (1923–26)
  - Colonel H.C.A. Hervey, V.D. (1926–30)
  - Colonel W.G. MacFarlane, V.D. (1930–31)
  - Colonel H. de. N. Watson, C.B.E. (1931–34)
  - Lieutenant-Colonel W.W. Henderson, V.D. (1934–36)
- 24th Infantry Brigade
  - Vacant (1922–23)
  - Colonel G. MacDonald, V.D. (1923–26)
  - Colonel D.L. Redman (1926–30)
  - Colonel D.G.L. Cunnington, O.B.E., M.C., V.D. (1930–35)
  - Colonel E.R. Knight, V.D. (1935–36)
- 29th Infantry Brigade
  - Colonel F.C. Jamieson (1923–27)
  - Lieutenant-Colonel T.C. Sims (1927–29)
  - Colonel A.C. Gillespie, V.D. (1929–33)
  - Colonel A.W. Bannard, M.M. (1933–36)
- 2nd (Reserve) Cavalry Brigade
  - Colonel W.W. Henderson, V.D. (1936–39)
  - Colonel A.E. Pittman (1938–42)
  - Headquarters Dormant (1942–46)
- 3rd (Reserve) Infantry Brigade
  - Colonel E.R. Knight, V.D. (1936–38)
  - Colonel N.D. Dingle (1938–42)
  - Headquarters Dormant (1942–46)
- 41st (Reserve) Brigade Group
  - Colonel E.R. Knight, V.D. (1942–45)
  - Brigadier G.R. Bradbrooke, M.C. (1945–46)
- 18th Infantry Brigade
  - Brigadier J.C. Jefferson, C.B.E., D.S.O. and Bar, E.D. (1946–48)
  - Brigadier R.C. Coleman, D.S.O., M.C. (1948–50)
  - Brigadier J.W. Proctor, O.B.E., E.D. (1950–54)
- 22 Militia Group
  - Brigadier F.T. Jenner, M.B.E., E.D. (1954)
  - Colonel (later Brigadier) T.B. Nash, D.S.O., C.D. (1954–56)
  - Colonel H.W. MacEwing, C.D. (1956–57)
  - Colonel (later Brigadier) H.T.R. Gregg, C.D. (1957–61)
  - Brigadier (later Major-General) W.A. Howard, C.M., C.M.M., C.D. (1961–65)
- 23 Militia Group
  - Vacant (1954–58)
  - Brigadier R.A. Bradburn, E.D. (1958–61)
  - Colonel G.J. Armstrong, C.D. (1963–65)
- Alberta Militia District
  - Colonel G.J. Armstrong, C.D. (1965–66)
  - Colonel M.F. MacLauchlan, O.B.E., M.C., C.D. (1966–68)
- Northern Alberta Militia District
  - Colonel G.J. Armstrong, C.D. (1968–69)
  - Colonel A.T. Hutton, C.D. (1969–72)
  - Colonel D.D. Kuchinski, C.D. (1972–73)
  - Colonel W.G. Ames, O.M.M., C.D. (1973–76)
  - Colonel A.B. Mottershead, C.D. (1976–79)
  - Colonel A.R. Gebauer, C.D. (1979–83)
  - Colonel W.F. Joyce, C.D. (1983–87)
  - Colonel C.G. Marshall, O.M.M., C.D. (1987–90)
  - Colonel D.D. Miller, C.D. (1991)
- Southern Alberta Militia District
  - Vacant (1968–70)
  - Colonel L.S. Thompson C.D. (1970–73)
  - Colonel (later Brigadier-General) H.O Wagg, K.St.J., C.D. (1973–75)
  - Colonel G.D. Stewart, C.D. (1975–77)
  - Colonel R.O. Jacobson, C.D. (1977–80)
  - Colonel S.E. Blakely, C.D. (1980–83)
  - Colonel P.F. Hughes, C.D. (1983–87)
  - Colonel (later Brigadier-General) R.S. Millar, O.M.M., C.D. (1987–90)
  - Colonel J. Fletcher, C.D. (1990–91)
- Alberta District
  - Colonel J. Fletcher, C.D. (1991—94)
  - Colonel (later Brigadier-General) R.S. Millar, O.M.M., C.D. (1994-1996)
  - Colonel T. Wolf, C.D. (1996–97)
- 41 Canadian Brigade Group
  - Colonel M. Quinn, C.D. (1997-2000)
  - Colonel C. Hamel, C.D. (2000–02)
  - Colonel (later Major-General) J.G. Milne, M.S.M., C.D. (2003)
  - Colonel J.D. Gludo, C.D. (2003–06)
  - Colonel A. Wreidt, C.D. (2006–09)
  - Colonel (later Brigadier-General) T. Putt, M.S.M., C.D. (2009–10)
  - Colonel (later Major-General) P. Bury, O.M.M., C.D. (2010–11)
  - Lieutenant-Colonel M.J. Delaney, C.D. (2011)
  - Colonel R.C. Boehli, C.D. (2011–13)
  - Colonel J.D. Conrad, M.S.M., C.D. (2013–16)
  - Colonel E. van Weelderen, C.D. (2016–19)
  - Colonel M.C. Vernon, C.D. (2019–22)
  - Colonel C.W. Hunt, C.D. (2022–25)

== Past sergeants-major of 41 Canadian Brigade Group ==
- Chief Warrant Officer (later Lieutenant-Colonel) R.F. Cruickshank, M.M.M., C.D. (1997)
- Chief Warrant Officer P. Tamblyn, M.M.M., C.D. (1997-2000)
- Chief Warrant Officer P.J. Wonderham, M.M.M., C.D. (2000–03)
- Chief Warrant Officer R.L. Page, M.M.M., C.D. (2003–04)
- Chief Warrant Officer (later Major) K.J. Griffiths, M.M.M., C.D. (2004–07)
- Chief Warrant Officer (later Captain) A.M.R. Brunelle, C.D. (2007–10)
- Chief Warrant Officer A.M. Thomas, C.D. (2010–12)
- Chief Warrant Officer E.G. Kelly, M.S.M., C.D. (2012–15)
- Chief Warrant Officer (later Captain) M.B. Talty, M.M.M., C.D. (2015–19)
- Chief Warrant Officer (later Major) R.S. Doyle, C.D. (2019–22)
- Chief Warrant Officer (later Major) S. Stamp, C.D. (2022–25)
