= 41 Signal Regiment =

- 41^{e} Régiment des transmissions (French)
- Active: 2011–present
- Country: Canada
- Branch: Canadian Army
- Role: Military communications
- Size: 4 squadrons
- Part of: 41 Canadian Brigade Group
- Garrison/HQ: LCol Philip L. Debney Armoury, Edmonton, Alberta
- Mottos: Signiferi excellentia (Latin for 'Signals, excellence')
- Mascot: Swift Fox
- Website: 41signals.ca

Commanders
- Commanding officer: LCol John Clark, CD
- Regimental sergeant major: CWO James Way, CD
- Honorary colonel: HCol Vacant
- Honorary lieutenant-colonel: HLCol Tara Veer
- Abbreviation: 41 Sig Regt

41 Signal Regiment (41 Sig Regt, French: 41^{e} Régiment des transmissions) is a reserve communications unit of the Royal Canadian Corps of Signals. It is part of 41 Canadian Brigade Group (41 CBG) in Alberta. The unit consists of:

- Regimental Headquarters (RHQ) in Edmonton
- Headquarters Squadron (HQ Sqn) in all three locations
- 1 Squadron (1 Sqn) in Edmonton
- 2 Squadron (2 Sqn) in Red Deer
- 3 Squadron (3 Sqn) in Calgary

The unit parades on Wednesday evenings and Saturdays at the LCol Philip L. Debney Armoury in Edmonton, at the Cormack Armoury in Red Deer, and at HMCS Tecumseh in Calgary.

== History ==
The regiment was created on 26 July 2011 by amalgamating the three independent communication squadrons in Alberta.

Squadron history
Squadron	Former title	Founded
1 Squadron Edmonton	745 (Edmonton) Communication Squadron	1 October 1970
2 Squadron Red Deer	749 (Red Deer) Communication Squadron	4 July 1978
3 Squadron Calgary	746 (Calgary) Communication Squadron	21 June 1971

== Cadets ==
There are several Royal Canadian Army Cadets units spread across Alberta which are affiliated to 41 Signal Regiment.

Corps	Location
2981 Strathcona Communication Army Cadet Corps	Edmonton, Alberta
No Affiliated Unit	Red Deer, Alberta
2509 Royal Canadian Signals Army Cadet Corps	Calgary, Alberta

Cadet units affiliated to signal regiments receive support and also are entitled to wear traditional signals accoutrements on their uniforms.
