= 15 Field Ambulance =

15 (Edmonton) Field Ambulance
- Active: 1939–present
- Country: Canada
- Branch: Canadian Armed Forces
- Type: Medical
- Size: Company
- Part of: 1 Health Services Group, Canadian Forces Health Services Group
- Garrison/HQ: Brigadier James Curry Jefferson Building
- Motto: Militi succurrimus (Latin for 'We hasten to aid the soldier')
- March: "The Farmer's Boy"
- Anniversaries: 75th (2014)

Commanders
- Commanding officer: Lieutenant-Colonel JR Kors, CD
- Regimental Sergeant-Major: Chief Warrant Officer Madoc Finch, CD
- Honorary colonel: Vacant
- Honorary lieutenant-colonel: Vacant

15 (Edmonton) Field Ambulance (15 (Edm) Fd Amb) is a Canadian Forces Primary Reserve medical unit headquartered in Edmonton, Alberta, with a detachment in Calgary (15 (Edmonton) Field Ambulance Detachment Calgary). The unit's mission is to attract, train, force generate and retain high-quality health service personnel to provide health service support to the 41 Canadian Brigade Group and to augment CF's domestic and international operations. An additional and important activity is to participate in activities that will raise its profile in Edmonton and Calgary.

== History ==
15 (Edmonton) Field Ambulance's lineage originates with No. 4 Casualty Clearing Station mobilized in December 1939 as one of the medical units of the 1st Canadian Division for service overseas during the second world war. No. 4 CSS departed Halifax on 30 Jan 1940 embarked in the Empress of Britain and disembarked along the Clyde on 8 February 1940. The unit was directed to Aldershot where it spent the next three years. The medical services of No. 4 CCS during the winter of 1941–42 were provided in a large country house that accommodated 130 patients. Patients expected to be ill for more than three or four days were transferred from a field ambulance to the CCS.

During the Dieppe Raid, No. 4 CCS remained in Dorking, England. Casualties from the battle were evacuated by landing craft back to the casualty reception area at Portsmouth and No. 4 CCS handled the walking wounded.

In 1943 No. 4 CCS was sent to Sicily and operated in Catania providing care for sick and injured Canadian soldiers. The unit followed the battle of the I Canadian Corps through Ortona to the Gustav Line, on to the Hitler Line and Northern Italy. In 1945, the unit moved to Marseille, France, and to Belgium and finally into the Netherlands. No. 4 CCS opened with attached surgical and transfusion units in Brakkenstein, near Nijmegen.

At the war's end, No. 4 CCS returned to Canada and was re-designated No. 36 Casualty Clearing Station in the Militia. In 1954, the unit was once again re-designated No. 23 Medical Company (Royal Canadian Army Medical Corps). 23 Med Coy trained to achieve the highest standards and won the Ryerson Trophy each year from 1961 to 1964, and 1972 to 1974.

In 1978 No. 23 Medical Company was once again redesignated as 15 (Edmonton) Medical Company. In 1991, 14 Medical Platoon of 14 (Calgary) Service Battalion was reassigned and became 15 (Edmonton) Medical Company Detachment Calgary. In 2004, subsequent to the reorganization of all Canadian Forces medical and dental units into the Canadian Forces Health Services Group, the militia medical companies were re-designated and organized as Reserve field ambulances and the unit became 15 (Edmonton) Field Ambulance with its detachment 15 (Edmonton) Field Ambulance Detachment Calgary.

== Present day ==
15 (Edm) Fd Amb is a unit of 1 Health Services Group (1 HSG) and under operational control (OPCON) when supporting 41 Canadian Brigade Group, consisting of all Alberta Army Reserve personnel. As a Canadian Forces (CF) Primary Reserve unit, members may serve on a full or part-time basis. Deployments are voluntary, and personnel continue to serve alongside Regular Force CF members. The Edmonton unit is based at Brigadier James Curry Jefferson Building, and in Calgary at the Mewata Armoury. The commanding officer (CO) is Lieutenant-Colonel JR Kors, CD and the current regimental sergeant major (RSM) is Chief Warrant Officer Madoc Finch, CD following a May 2026 Change of Command and Change of Appointment.

== Command team ==
=== Past commanding officers (incomplete list) ===
- Lieutenant-Colonel Terry Larson, OMM, CD, AdeC (2023–2026). Appointed Officer of the Order of Military Merit 11 Sep 2025.
- Lieutenant-Colonel David Allen, CD (2019–2023)
- Lieutenant-Colonel Marie Lubiniecki, CD (2016–2019). Post Command served in several roles and in Dec 2025 was promoted to Colonel and appointed Director of Health Services Personnel
- Commander Robert Briggs, CD, MD, CCFP (2013–2016)
- Lieutenant-Colonel Roger Scott, OMM, CD, AdeC, PhD, NP (2007–2013). Post-command served as Deputy Commander 1 Health Services Group. Promoted Colonel Feb 2015. Appointed Director of Health Services Reserve Oct 2015– May 2021. Appointed Officer of the Order of Military Merit 4 Oct 2018. Appointed Director Reserves Jun 2021. Promoted Brigadier-General Nov 2021 and appointed Director General External Reviews Implementation Secretariat becoming the first Health Services Reserve Officer to attain general officer rank.
- Lieutenant-Colonel Ross Purser, CD, MD, CCFP(EM) (2004–2007)
- Lieutenant-Colonel Louise Leslie, CD (2001–2004)
- Lieutenant-Colonel J.W. Cutbill, CD, MD, MSc, CCFP (2000–2001)
- Major Steve Merrette, CD (1999)
- Major Louise Leslie, CD (1998–1999)
- Lieutenant-Colonel Jim Hennessey (1997–1998)
- Major Jim N. Slauenwhite, CD (1994–1997)
- Lieutenant-Colonel M.L. Quinn, OMM, SSStJ, CD, RN (1991–1994). Appointed Officer of the Order of Military Merit 29 Nov 1993. Post-Command was promoted Colonel and became first woman to command a Canadian Brigade Group (41 CBG) in 1997. Appointed first Reserve Advisor to Commander Canadian Forces Health Services Group (later Director Health Services Reserve) from 2000 to 2007.
- Lieutenant-Colonel Jacqueline McLellan (1985–1991)
- Lieutenant-Colonel Hudson (1982–1985)
- Lieutenant-Colonel Scotty Lamb (1980–1982)
- Major Bob Salzman (1979–1980)
- Major Donna Lynch (1977–1978)
- Lieutenant-Colonel E.S.O. Smith (1977)
- Major Wilfred Berry (1975–1976)
- Lieutenant-Colonel Frank C. Haley, CD, MD (1969–1974)
- Lieutenant-Colonel E.S.O. Smith (1968–1969 TBC)
- Lieutenant-Colonel H.A. Schwarz, CD, MD, CCFP (Date TBC)
- Lieutenant-Colonel MacPherson (Date TBC)
- Lieutenant-Colonel Downs (Date TBC)
- Lieutenant-Colonel M. Weinlos (Date TBC)

=== Past regimental sergeants-major ===
- Chief Warrant Officer Kristopher Porlier CD, MEd, BSc, ACP (2022–2026). Post appointment served as Op Reassurance MMU RSM Jun - Dec 2026.
- Chief Warrant Officer Suzanne McAdam, MMM, CD (2019–2022). Appointed Member of the Order of Military Merit 12 Oct 2017.
- Chief Warrant Officer Rudy Schmidtke, CD (2016–2019)
- Chief Warrant Officer Mark R. Noble, CD (2011–2016)
- Master Warrant Officer Linda M. Weidmann, CD (2006–2011)
- Master Warrant Officer Dwight B. Fudge (2005–2006)
- Vacant (2002–2005)
- Chief Warrant Officer Bob L. Page (2001–2002)
- Chief Warrant Officer T.D. (Dick) Greuter (1997–2001)
- Chief Warrant Officer Cecil F. Shaver (1995–1997)
- Chief Warrant Officer Carson G. Woodman (1991–1995)
- Warrant Officer T.D. (Dick) Greuter (1990–1991)
- Warrant Officer Linda M. Wheeler (Weidmann) (1982–1990)
- Vacant (1981–1982)
- Warrant Officer R. Short (1980–1981)
- Vacant (1979–1980)
- Warrant Officer Vic Mottershead (1978–1979)
- Vacant (1977–1978)
- Sergeant Dave Vicen (1975–1977)
- Warrant Officer Jim Beauchamp (1970–1975)
- Master Warrant Officer J.D. Newel (1965–1970)
- Regimental Sergeant-Major W. Radulski (1963–1965)
- Vacant (1962–1963)
- Regimental Sergeant-Major W. Kendall (1961–1962)
- Regimental Sergeant-Major A.C. Duncan (1959–1961)
- Regimental Sergeant-Major L.S. Hooper (1953–1959)
- Regimental Sergeant-Major R. Miller (1945–1953)

=== Past honorary colonels ===
- Colonel Stewart Hamilton, MD, FRCSC, FACS (2015–201x)
- Vacant (2012–2015)
- Colonel the Honorable Allan H. Wachowich (2008–2012)
- Colonel James Donald Johnston (2003–2006)
- Colonel Kenneth Angus Munn (1993–2003)
- Colonel Harald A.J. Schwarz

=== Past honorary lieutenant-colonels ===
- Lieutenant-Colonel Gord Steinke (2012–2021)
- Vacant (2011–2012)
- Lieutenant-Colonel Sandra J. Munn (2005–2011)
- Lieutenant-Colonel Kenneth Angus Munn (1991–1993)
- Lieutenant-Colonel Robert James Sinclair Gibson
- Lieutenant-Colonel R.C. Bray
- Lieutenant-Colonel Harald A. Schwarz

== Members killed in action ==
- Corporal Michael Starker – born January 1, 1972, died May 6, 2008, Pashmul Region, Zhari district (25 km west of Kandahar) Afghanistan – was both a soldier and a Calgary Emergency Medical Services paramedic.

== Awards ==
- 2014
  - 75th Anniversary of the unit (1939-2014)
  - Freedom of the City of Edmonton and Calgary.
  - St John Ambulance Alberta Council Provincial First Aid Competitions
- 2013
  - Best Emergency Responder Team – Corporals T. Woroniuk, B. Warick, C. Livesy and J. Augustyn.
- 2012
  - Best Standard First Aid Team Captain – Private J. Fillion
  - Best Novice Team – 15 (Edmonton) Field Ambulance: Privates Fillion, Dorrance, Behnke and Waite.
- 2010
  - Best Emergency Responder Team Captain – Sergeant K.N. Porlier
  - Best Novice Team – 15 (Edmonton) Field Ambulance: Sergeant K. Porlier, Corporal C. Amberley, Corporal E. Lau, Private A. Nichols.
- 2007
  - Best Emergency Responder Team Captain – Sergeant V.E. Churchill

== Operations ==
15 Field Ambulance members have deployed in many domestic and international operations including:

- Operation Reassurance (Latvia), individual augmentees; LMU for BMS Surge Exercise Oak Resolve Apr/May 2026 deployed 13 members including Capt Cary Roberts as BMS Commander.
- Operation Unifier(Ukraine)
- Operation Provision (Syrian Refugee Response)
- Operation Lentus (Southern Alberta Flooding)
- Operation Athena (Afghanistan)
- Operation Podium (2010 Olympic Games, British Columbia)
- Operation Archer (Afghanistan)
- Operation Peregrine (2003 British Columbia Forest Fires)
- Operation Danaca (Golan Heights)
- Operation Palladium (Bosnia-Herzegovina)
- United Nations Emergency Force (UNEF) (Egypt)

== Royal Canadian Army Cadets ==
15 (Edmonton) Field Ambulance is affiliated with 2995 Medical Company RCACC, based in Lac La Biche, Alberta.
