= 14 (Calgary) Service Battalion =

14 Service Battalion
- Active: 1965-2010
- Country: Canada
- Branch: Primary Reserve
- Type: Combat Service Support
- Part of: 3rd Canadian Division
- Garrison/HQ: Calgary, Alberta
- Motto: Dleasdanach os cionn gach ni Gaelic for: "Vigilance Above Everything"
- Abbreviation: 14 Svc Bn

== History ==
Formed in 1965 when the Canadian Armed Forces amalgamated, the Combat Service Support units were formed into Service Battalions. The 14 Service Battalion was initially formed with the following elements:

- Transport Company: 150 Company, Royal Canadian Army Service Corps;
- Maintenance Company: A Squadron, 9 Technical Regiment, Royal Canadian Electrical Mechanical Engineers;
- Supply Company: 6 Ordnance Company, Royal Canadian Ordnance Corps;
- Medical Section: 21 Medical Company, Royal Canadian Army Medical Corps;
- Military Police: 14 Provost Company, Canadian Provost Corps.

While initially titled Calgary Service Battalion, in 1975 it assumed the name of 14 (Calgary) Service Battalion. The Battalion would serve in this role until its amalgamation with 15 (Edmonton) Service Battalion and Area Support Unit Calgary to form 41 Service Battalion in 2010.

== Commanding Officers ==
- 1965-1968: LCol K. Cashman, CD;
- 1968-1970: LCol L. Thompson, CD;
- 1970-1972: LCol C.A. Haddock, CD;
- 1972-1973: LCol T.W. MacDonald, CD;
- 1973-1976: LCol M.A. O'Sullivan, KStJ, CD;
- 1976-1980: LCol J.R. Davidson, CD;
- 1980-1982: LCol K.A. Munn, CD;
- 1982-1986: LCol J.R. Anderson, CD:
- 1986-1990: LCol A.P. Fahey, CD;
- 1990-1993: LCol H. Berard, CD;
- 1993-1996: LCol D.D. Stinson, CD;
- 1996-1998: LCol T. Stirling, CD;
- 1998-1999: Maj R.S. Sinclair;
- 1999-2001: LCol J.D. Gludo, CD;
- 2001-2003: LCol J.J Martin, CD;
- 2003-2005: LCol R.C. Boehli, CD;
- 2005-2008: LCol B. Doherty, CD;
- 2008-2010: LCol G. Haight, CD*.

== 2010 Realignment ==
- LCol G. Haight took command of the newly amalgamated 41 Service Battalion in 2010.
