= 41 Service Battalion =

- 41^{e} Bataillon des services
- Battalion badge
- Active: 1910–present
- Country: Canada
- Branch: Canadian Army
- Type: Combat service support
- Size: 3 companies
- Part of: 41 Canadian Brigade Group, 3rd Canadian Division
- Garrison/HQ: Calgary, Alberta, Edmonton, Alberta
- Motto(s): Vitæ vena in certamine proelii (Latin for 'the lifeblood in battle')
- Website: canada.ca/en/army/corporate/3-canadian-division/41-service-battalion.html

Commanders
- Commanding officer: Lieutenant-Colonel Adam Carleton
- Regimental sergeant major: Chief Warrant Officer Ted Coderre

Insignia
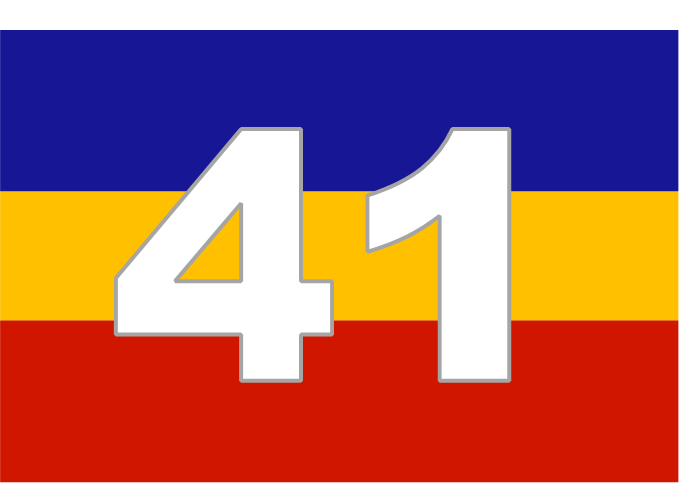
- Camp flag

41 Service Battalion (41 Svc Bn) is a Canadian Army Primary Reserve combat service support unit with three companies at Currie Armoury in Calgary and at Debney Armoury in Edmonton, Alberta. The battalion is under the command of 41 Canadian Brigade Group, itself part of the 3rd Canadian Division, one of four region-based Canadian Army divisions. The battalion is made up of officers and soldiers primarily from the Corps of Royal Canadian Electrical and Mechanical Engineers and the Royal Canadian Logistics Service and provides transport, maintenance, supply, food services and administrative support to 41 Canadian Brigade Group and other military elements in Alberta.

== Subunits ==
- 14 Service Company - Calgary
- 15 Service Company - Edmonton
- Headquarters Company - Calgary / Edmonton

== History ==
The history of 41 Service Battalion begins with the formation of No. 14 Company, Canadian Army Service Corps (CASC) in Calgary on April 1, 1910. In Edmonton, No. 22 Company, CASC, was formed in 1922. The battalion's lineage is complicated by the move from a horse-based military at its origins to the modern mechanized force of today. This has caused the formation of new corps such as the Royal Canadian Electrical Mechanical Engineers (RCEME) to maintain the complex equipment as well as the amalgamation of other corps such as the Royal Canadian Army Service Corps and Royal Canadian Ordnance Corps under the combined Logistics title. Through these changes, the battalion has served in communities across the province in peacetime as well as in almost every conflict including the First World War, the Second World War, peacekeeping and the conflict in Afghanistan. The largest change to the organization was the formation of the experimental service battalion concept in the mid-1960s which saw various corps being brought together in one organization including the Royal Canadian Army Service Corps (RCASC), the Royal Canadian Ordnance Corps (RCOC), the Royal Canadian Army Pay Corps, the Royal Canadian Postal Corps and the Royal Canadian Electrical Mechanical Engineers (RCEME). Other corps, including Military Police and Medical have been included for short periods of time. The unification of the Canadian Armed Forces brought greater change with the merging of the RCASC and RCOC under the Logistics Branch. No matter the construct of the battalion, the goal has always been to provide combat service support to the units that it is tasked with sustaining during war, peace and during domestic emergencies. In 2017, 41 Service Battalion became associated the Clan McNaughton Pipes and Drums after many years of parading together at events in Edmonton.

== Cadet corps ==
Active

- 1955 Royal Canadian Army Cadet Corps - Calgary
- 2467 Royal Canadian Army Cadet Corps - Westlock
- 2733 Royal Canadian Army Cadet Corps - Edmonton
- 3025 Royal Canadian Army Cadet Corps - Didsbury

Disbanded

- 326 Royal Canadian Army Cadet Corps - Calgary
- 535 Royal Canadian Army Cadet Corps - Blairmore
- 1028 Royal Canadian Army Cadet Corps - Drumheller
- 2130 Royal Canadian Army Cadet Corps - Delia

Re-badged

- 2383 Royal Canadian Army Cadet Corps (Now affiliated with The Calgary Highlanders) - Turner Valley

== Leadership ==
Commanding officers:

- 2010-2011: Lieutenant-Colonel G. Haight, CD
- 2011-2014: Lieutenant-Colonel D. Beauchamp, CD
- 2014-2017: Lieutenant-Colonel D.M. Sweeney, CD
- 2017–2020: Lieutenant-Colonel P.J. Boyle, CD
- 2020–2023: Lieutenant-Colonel G. Longhurst, CD
- 2023–present: Lieutenant-Colonel A. Carleton, CD

Regimental Sergeants Major:

- 2010-2013: CWO M. Dijiker, CD
- 2013-2016: CWO R. Pettit, CD
- 2016–2019: CWO M. Noble, KStJ, CD
- 2019–2021: CWO J. MacCormack, CD
- 2021–2025: CWO T. Coderre, CD
- 2025-present: CWO R. Deir, CD

== Battalion badge ==
The white peaks refer to the Rocky Mountains of Alberta, the province in which the unit is located. The wild rose is the provincial flower. The ears of wheat represent the prairie region of the province. The Bain wagon was a vehicle used for combat service support during the early history of the Royal Canadian Army Service Corps.

== Notable personalities ==
- Peter Bawden, Calgary politician who won the Calgary (South) riding in 1972 and was honorary colonel of the battalion for a period.
- Angus Munn. Commanding officer and Physician.
- Harris George Rogers, the commanding officer 6th Divisional Petrol Company during the Second World War.
