= Angus Munn =

Canadian soldier

Angus Munn O St.J., CD, QHP
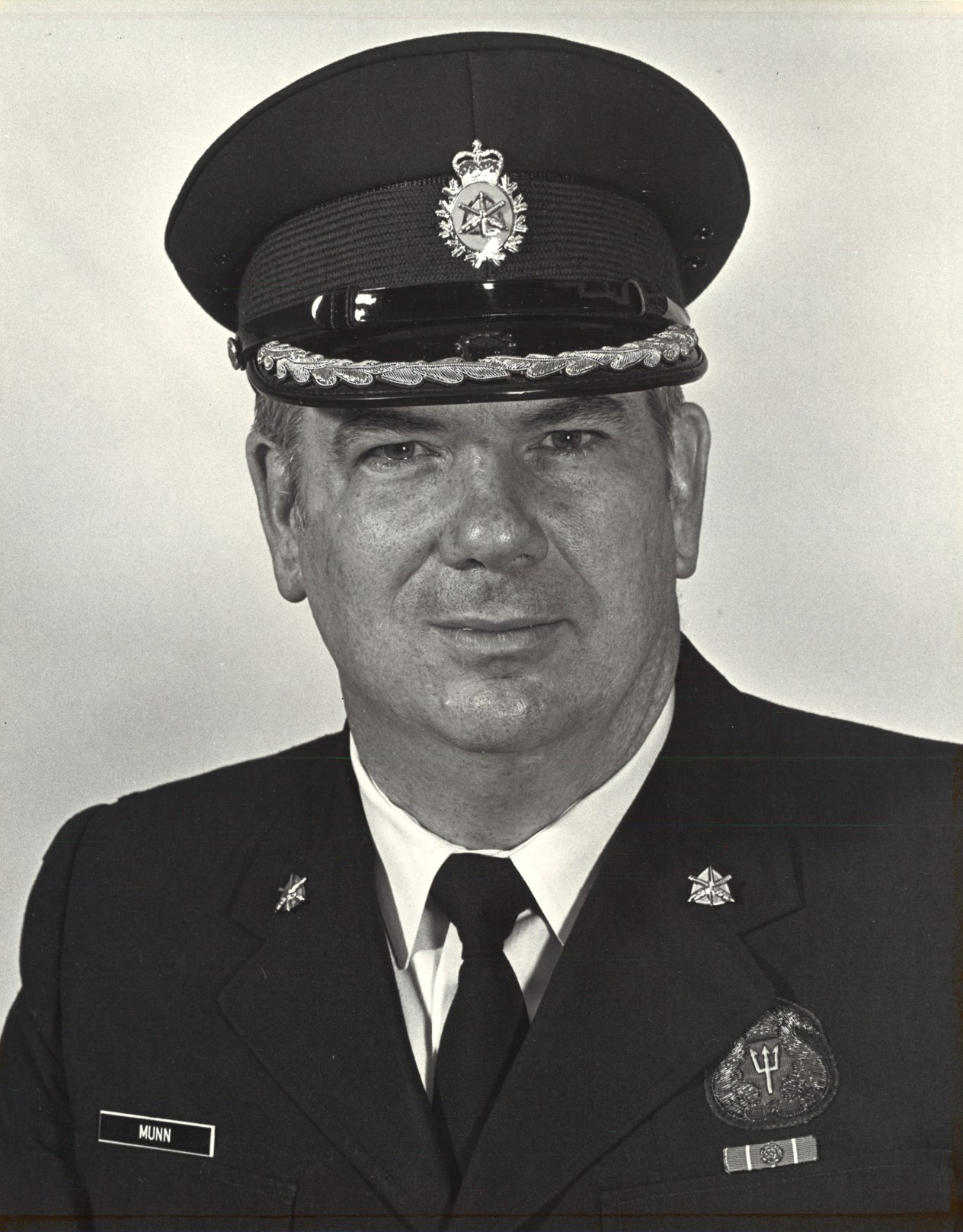
- HCol. K. Angus Munn.
- Born: June 16, 1938; Montreal, Quebec
- Died: May 3, 2003 (aged 64)
- Military career
- Allegiance: Canada
- Branch: Canadian Army
- Service years: 1955-1982
- Rank: Colonel
- Units: The Black Watch (Royal Highland Regiment) of Canada; 3 Field Squadron, RCE; 6 Field Squadron, RCE; The King's Own Calgary Regiment (RCAC); 14 (Calgary) Service Battalion
- Commands: 14 (Calgary) Service Battalion
- Awards: Canadian Forces' Decoration; Queen Elizabeth II Golden Jubilee Medal

Colonel Angus Munn, CD QHP (June 16, 1938 – May 3, 2003) was a Canadian soldier and doctor.

== Biography ==
=== Early life ===
Munn was born in Montreal, Quebec, to Daniel James McArthur and Margaret B. A. Moodie. The family lived in the eastern townships of Quebec until Angus turned seven and then moved to Alberta, where he attended Strathcona School. Later he spent two years at Central High School in Calgary, Alberta, Canada. It was while attending Central High school that he met Barbara Hovey, his future wife.

At the age of sixteen, Munn lied about his age to the Canadian Army and joined the Black Watch regiment in 1955. Eleven years passed with this regiment, during which Munn served two tours in Germany beginning in March 1962 and ending in June 1965. After serving with the Black Watch he successfully remastered to third field squadron in 1966 to 1968, where he served as one of the first combat divers. In 1968 Munn took his release to study physiology at the University of British Columbia. He rejoined with six Field Squadron RCE and was commissioned from the ranks in January 1970, serving as a troop commander and as squadron training officer among other duties.

Munn (a captain at the time) moved to Calgary in 1971 to study medicine at the University of Calgary and received his MD in 1974. During this time he joined the staff of Headquarters South Alberta District. In 1974 Munn was promoted to the rank of major and posted to The Kings Own Calgary Regiment, where he served as a squadron training commander and deputy commander until 1977. In 1977 he was again transferred and posted to 14 Service Battalion, where he served as deputy commander until 1980, when he was made commanding officer and given the freedom of the City of Calgary.

In 1979 Munn received his Fellowship in the Royal College of Physicians of Canada in the field of anesthesia. This was quickly followed by his multi-engine pilots license and flight surgeon status. He added to this interest by becoming qualified in hyperbaric medicine.

Munn was appointed aide-de-camp to the lieutenant governor of the Province of Alberta in April 1980. Munn made the choice to retire from the militia in June 1982 and subsequently served as vice president of the Army Cadet League of Alberta from 1982 to 1984 and president of the Alberta Branch of the Defense Medical Association of Canada from 1984 to 1986.

In 1991 Munn was appointed honorary colonel of 15 Field Ambulance and in 1994 became the first reserve anesthesiologist to be posted on a UN relief mission in Bosnia.

Munn was elected president of the Defense Medical Association in 1996 and, that same year, was admitted to the Venerable Order of Saint John. He joined the staff of the University of Alberta Hospitals in Edmonton in 1998, where he was an assistant clinical professor in the Faculty of Medicine.

Munn was a Knight Commander in the Hospitaller Order of St. John of Jerusalem, past Grand Prior of the Priory of Canada, Honorary Physician to Her Majesty Queen Elizabeth II. and Grand Counselor to the Sovereign Counsel and recipient of the Queen's Golden Jubilee Medal.

=== Degrees, diplomas, and certificates ===
- FRCPC, Anesthesia, 1979
- LMCC,1976
- MD, University of Calgary, 1974
- Flight surgeon, Defense and Civil Institute of Environmental Medicine, 1993
- Neonatal Resuscitation – Provider, UAH, 1995
- ATLS Qualification, RAH 1987
- ACLS Re-qualification, GMCC, 1987
- Shallow Water Diving Land Forces, Medical Officers' Course, Defense and Civil Institute of Environmental Medicine, 1976
- Mast. D., (British Master Diver), Dartmouth, UK, 1964

=== Hospital appointments ===
- 1997–2003 Active staff, Sturgeon Community Hospital
- 1995–2003 Medical staff, Capital Health Region
- 1994 Active staff, Forward Surgical Team, CanBat 2, Visoko, Bosnia-Herzegovina
- 1993–2003 Courtesy staff, Children's Health Centre of Northern Alberta
- 1988–2003 Medical staff, University of Alberta Hospitals
- 1980–1988 Active medical staff, Calgary General Hospital
- 1992–1994 Respiratory technology training coordinator, Department of Anesthesia, University of Alberta
- 1984–1987 Continuing medical education director, Department of Anesthesia, Calgary General Hospital
- 1982–1983 Residency program director, Department of Anesthesia, Calgary General Hospital
- 1980–1983 Consulting medical staff, Foothills Hospital
- 1980–1981 Associate medical staff, Alberta Children's Hospital

=== Academic appointments ===
- 1988–2003 Assistant clinical professor, Department of Anesthesia Faculty of Medicine, University of Alberta
- 1984–1989 Clinical assistant professor, Department of Anesthesia, Faculty of Medicine, University of Calgary

=== Medical committee appointments ===
- 1995–2003 Interviewer, Medical Admissions, University of Alberta
- 1990–1994 Member, Budget and Finance Committee, Department of Anesthesia, University of Alberta Hospitals
- 1989–1996 Chairman, Medical Quality Improvement Committee, Department of Anesthesia, University of Alberta Hospitals
- 1987–1989 Chairman, Medical Economics Committee, Canadian Anesthesiologists' Society (CAS)
- 1986–1987 Member, Membership Committee, CAS
- 1983–1986 Member, Committee on Anesthetic and Operative Deaths, Alberta Medical Association
- 1981–1988 Member, Pharmacy and Therapeutics Committee, Calgary General Hospital
