= 41 Combat Engineer Regiment =

- 41^{e} Régiment du génie de combat
- Active: 2008–present
- Country: Canada
- Branch: Canadian Army
- Type: Combat engineers
- Size: Two engineer squadrons; One administrative squadron
- Part of: 41 Canadian Brigade Group
- Garrison/HQ: Regimental Headquarters; 25 Engineer Squadron – Edmonton; 33 Engineer Squadron – Calgary; 85 Administration Squadron
- Motto: Ubique (Latin for 'everywhere')
- March: "Wings"
- Mascot: Sapper Bentley F. Beaver
- Anniversaries: 4 December, St. Barbara's Day
- Website: canada.ca/en/army/corporate/3-canadian-division/41-combat-engineer-regiment.html

Commanders
- Commanding Officer: LCol Christopher Barr, CD
- CME Colonel Commandant: BGen R.W. Deslauriers, OMM, CD (Ret)
- Abbreviation: 41 CER

41 Combat Engineer Regiment (41 CER, French: 41^{e} Régiment du génie de combat) is an Army Reserve (militia) unit of the Canadian Military Engineers/Royal Canadian Engineers (RCE) in Alberta, Canada. The unit consists of:

- Regimental Headquarters (RHQ),
- 25 Engineer Squadron (25 Engr Sqn) in Edmonton,
- 33 Engineer Squadron (33 Engr Sqn) in Calgary, and
- Administration Squadron (Admin Sqn).

The unit parades on Wednesday evenings and one weekend per month at the Lieutenant-Colonel Philip L. Debney Armoury in Edmonton, and at the General Sir Arthur Currie Building in Calgary. 41 CER is allocated to 41 Canadian Brigade Group, which in turn is part of 3rd Canadian Division.

== History ==
41 Combat Engineer Regiment was stood up on 6 September 2008 at a parade at the Military Museums in Calgary. The parade officially disbanded and amalgamated 8 Field Engineer Regiment and 33 Field Engineer Squadron. Amalgamation meant the resulting unit was entitled to the combined honours and history of the constituent units. This was authorized by Gordon O'Connor, then Minister of National Defence under Ministerial Organization Order 2006041 on 23 November 2006.

8 Field Engineer Regiment was the senior unit that was amalgamated and was created in 1947 as a result of a post-war reorganization of the militia engineers. At its peak the regiment controlled five sub-units:

- 13th Field Squadron in Calgary;
- 17th Field Squadron in Kimberley, British Columbia;
- 24th Field Squadron in Yellowknife, Northwest Territories;
- 25th Field Squadron in Edmonton; and
- 33rd Field Park Squadron in Lethbridge.

=== 25 Engineer Squadron ===
25 Engineer Squadron traces its lineage to 9th Army Troops Company (Royal Canadian Engineers) which was formed in 1937 following a reorganization of the militia in Canada. During the Second World War the company served as part of 1st Pioneer Battalion, later known as 1st Battalion Army Troops (Royal Canadian Engineers). Through most of the war, they served as construction troops supporting First Canadian Army. Following the war, the army troops companies were no longer required and the sub-unit was re-designated 25th Field Squadron with the task of providing field engineer support to Edmonton-area units.

=== 33 Engineer Squadron ===
33 Engineer Squadron traces its lineage back to the 6th Field Park Squadron (6 Fd Pk Sqn) that was formed in Lethbridge in 1940. 6 Field Park Squadron was mobilized in early 1941 and formed part of the 4th Canadian Armoured Division. Their task was supplying the field squadrons in the division, as well as all other units, with every kind of engineer material necessary. This included both military and local resources. A few of the items produced by 6 Field Park Squadron and delivered are 56,800 signs of all sizes and shapes, 16,300 barber poles or lane markers, 1,221 crosses, 4,000 drift pins and 8,000 timber dogs. In addition thousands of tons of innumerable other stores were hauled from Corps dumps or requisitioned from civilians.

Their skilled workers had to operate many times under the most adverse of conditions. In March 1946, the sappers returned home to Lethbridge and the unit was re-designated to 33rd Field Park Squadron in 1947. In 1954 the squadron was re-roled to a field squadron and in 1968 was relocated to Calgary. In 1971, the unit was relocated to Edmonton and zero-manned in favour of keeping 25th Field Squadron fully operational. On 23 July 1990, after a decade of lobbying by the Calgary Branch of the Military Engineers Association of Canada, 33rd Field Engineer Squadron was reactivated and relocated to Calgary. It achieved independent squadron status in 1991 and has provided combat engineering support to Calgary-area units for 18 years prior to amalgamating with 8 FER in 2008.

== Training ==
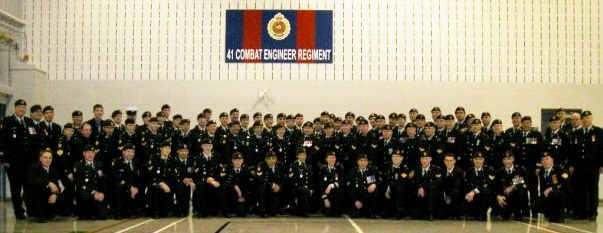
41 CER personnel at Debney Armoury, January 9, 2010

As a reserve unit, 41 Combat Engineer Regiment continues to train in skills to support the Canadian Forces abroad and at home. In recent years the regiment has conducted exercises in a variety of places, including.

- CFB Wainwright, Alberta
- Vegreville, Alberta
- Chilliwack, British Columbia
- Dundurn, Saskatchewan
- Drayton Valley, Alberta
- CFB Suffield, Alberta
- CFB Cold Lake, Alberta
- Outlook, Saskatchewan
- Hinton, Alberta
- Fort Lewis, Washington

== Deployments ==
Personnel from the unit have deployed on United Nations and NATO peacekeeping missions including:

- Cyprus (UNFICYP, Operation Snowgoose),
- Croatia (UNPROFOR, Operation Harmony),
- Cambodia (UNTAC, Operation Marquis),
- Bosnia (SFOR, Operation Palladium),
- Afghanistan (Operations Athena and Archer). 41 CER had one soldiers killed in Afghanistan, Sgt. George Miok.
- Poland and Latvia (Operation Reassurance),
- Kuwait (Operation Impact)

Personnel from 41 CER deployed for relief assistance in support of civilian authorities to the city of Calgary during the 2013 Alberta floods. 41 CER deployed under Task Force Silvertip in support of Operation Lentus. This was the first entirely reserve task force ever stood up by the Canadian military and encompassed all units in 41 Canadian Brigade Group. The unit continues to be in a state of readiness to respond as an aid to civil power as the impacts of climate change result in increased rates and severity of natural disasters within Canada.

== Relationship with Town of Vegreville ==
41 Combat Engineer Regiment has fostered a relationship with the Town of Vegreville, Alberta, which is 103 km east of Edmonton. On 29 April 2006 the unit received the Freedom of the Town, becoming the only unit in the Canadian Forces to have this honour.

The unit started this relationship in large part due to their yearly participation of 25 Engineer Squadron in the Remembrance Day parade. Eventually the unit received permission and blessings from the town to hold annual exercises within the town and the surrounding areas.

In 2007 the regiment built a new bridge in the park containing the town's famous pysanka (Ukrainian Easter egg). This was completed the same week-end the unit received the Freedom of the Town. On 7 May 2008, during a change of command parade, the bridge was formally named the LCol Dan O'Keefe Bridge for the outgoing commanding officer. The town council had voted to do so in large part due to O'Keefe's efforts at building a relationship with the town.

== Mascot ==
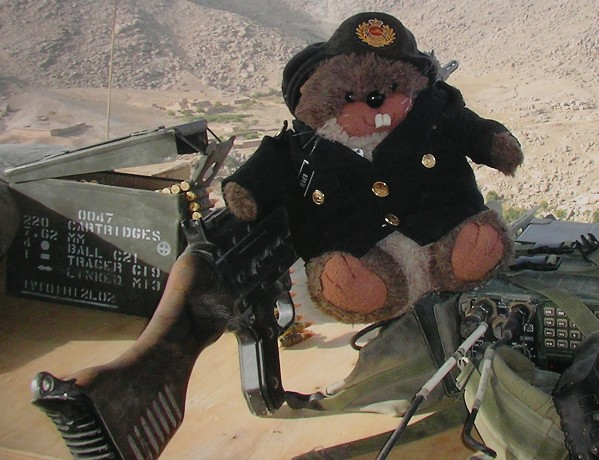
Sapper Bentley F. Beaver manning C6 machine-gun, Kandahar province, Afghanistan

Due in large part to their natural construction abilities and their presence in the Canadian wilderness, the beaver has long been the symbol of military engineers in Canada. The first cap-badge of the Canadian Engineers, that is the Militia component of the Engineers of the Canadian Army, had the beaver at its center.

The official mascot of 25 Engineer Squadron (formerly of 8 Field Engineer Regiment) is Sapper Bentley F. Beaver, a stuffed toy beaver who is dressed with a beret, dress uniform and identity discs.

Some members of the unit claim that Bentley is the most decorated beaver in the world. This is because he has accompanied members of the unit for short periods of time while on tour, and therefore he would be eligible for the medals for his presence on the deployment.

This is a partial list of medals and decorations Sapper Beaver would be entitled to:

- South-West Asia Service Medal
- General Campaign Star with ISAF Bar
- Canadian Peacekeeping Service Medal
- United Nations Transitional Authority in Cambodia Medal
- NATO Former Yugoslavia Medal
- NATO Non-Article 5 Medal
- 125th Anniversary of the Confederation of Canada Medal
- Queen Elizabeth II Golden Jubilee Medal
- Queen Elizabeth II Diamond Jubilee Medal
- Canadian Forces' Decoration
- Alberta Centennial Medal

== See also ==
- Military history of Canada
- History of the Canadian Army
- Canadian Forces
- List of armouries in Canada

== Order of precedence ==
Preceded by 39 Combat Engineer Regiment	41 Combat Engineer Regiment	Succeeded by Last in precedence of Canadian Military Engineers
