= Commander (Canada) =

Canadian naval rank

In the Royal Canadian Navy, the rank of commander (French: capitaine de frégate or capf) is a naval rank equal to a lieutenant-colonel of the army or air force. A commander is senior to a lieutenant-commander or an army or air force major, and junior to a captain or colonel.

Typical appointments for a commander include:

- Commanding officer of a school or training establishment, such as the Canadian Forces Fleet School
- Commanding officer of a frigate, destroyer, Naval Reserve Division or a cadet training centre
- Executive officer of a replenishment vessel
- Deputy commander of a Canadian Forces Base
- Senior staff officer or chief of staff on a formation staff, or a director-level position on an administrative staff

The rank insignia for a commander is three half-inch stripes, worn on the cuffs of the service dress jacket, and on slip-ons on other uniforms. On the visor of the service cap is one row of gold oak leaves along the edge. Commanders in the Naval Operations Branch wear the officers' pattern cap badge for that branch, which is an anchor on a black oval, surrounded by a wreath of maple leaves. Specialist officers in such branches as logistics, medical, etc. wear their respective branch cap badges.

A commander is addressed initially by rank and surname, thereafter by superiors and peers as "commander" and by subordinates as "sir" or "ma'am".

Navy uniform variations

Dress uniform tunic
