= Colonel (Canada) =

Officer rank of the Canadian Armed Forces

Colonel Colonel
- Insignia; Left: Army; Right: Air Force
- Country: Canada
- Service branch: Canadian Armed Forces
- Abbreviation: Col
- NATO rank code: OF-5
- Next higher rank: Brigadier-general
- Next lower rank: Lieutenant-colonel
- Equivalent ranks: Captain(N)

Colonel (Col; French: colonel, col) is a Canadian Forces rank used by commissioned officers who wear the army, air force or special operations uniform. Captain(N) is the equivalent rank for officers who wear the navy uniform. A colonel is senior to the army and air force rank of lieutenant-colonel or the naval rank of commander, and junior to the army and air force rank of brigadier-general or the naval rank of commodore.

== Insignia ==
Before unification of the Canadian Forces in 1968, rank structure and insignia followed the British pattern.

Army uniform variations

Dress uniform tunic

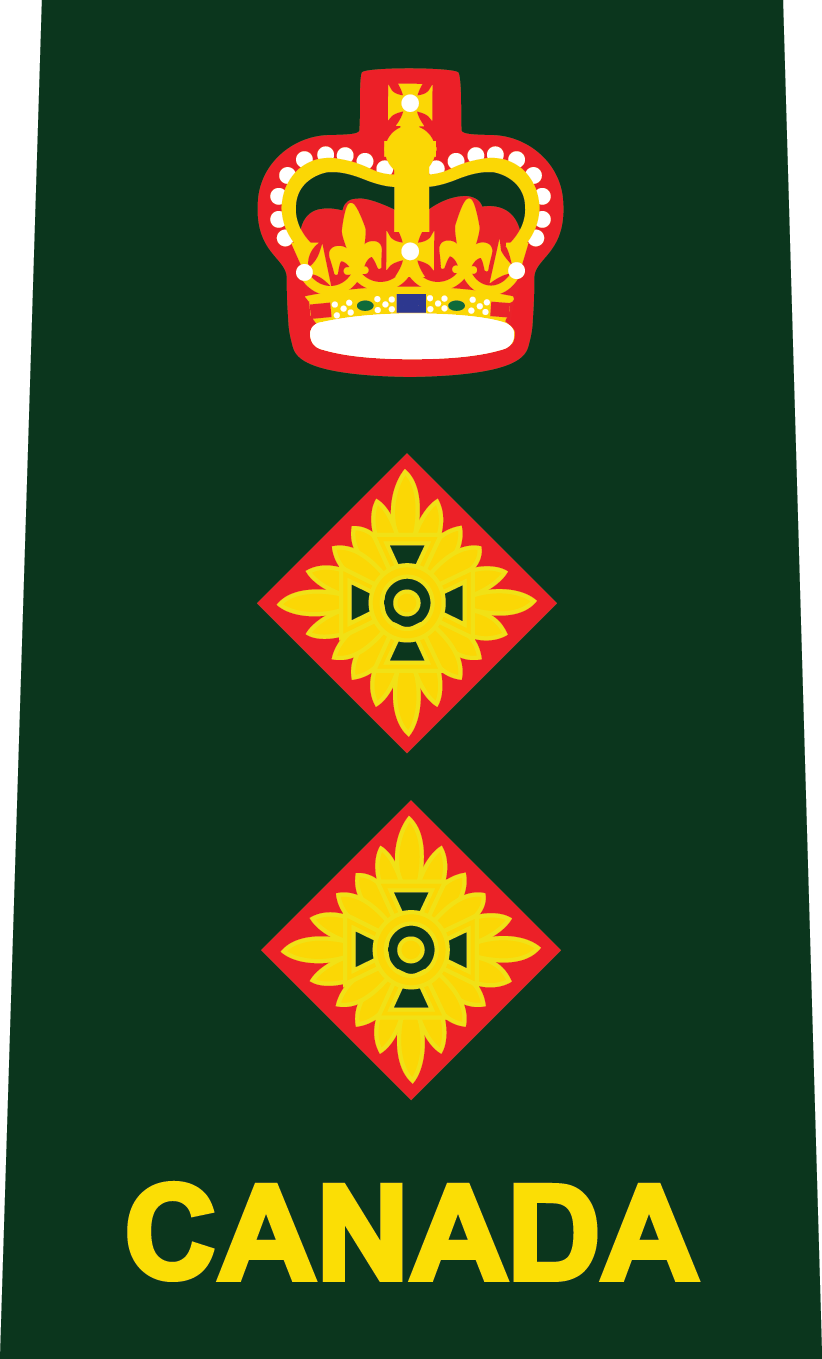
Uniform shirts

Olive green uniform (old insignia)

CADPAT uniform (old insignia)

Arid-region CADPAT uniform (old insignia)
Air Force uniform variations

Dress uniform tunic

Uniform shirts (old insignia)

CADPAT uniform

== Appointments ==
Typical appointments for colonels include:

- Base commander (BComd)
- Wing commander (Wg Comd)
- Commanding officer of a school or training establishment, such as commandant of the Canadian Army Command and Staff College, or commander of Combat Training Centre Gagetown
- Commander of a brigade group
- Branch advisor
- Military attaché to foreign nations

The rank insignia for air force uniform is four 1/2-inch (1.3 cm) stripes, worn on the cuffs of the service dress jacket, and on slip-ons on other uniforms. The insignia for army and special operations uniform is two stars and a crown. The insignia worn on the headdress for an army or special operations colonel is the crest of the Canadian coat of arms: a crowned gold lion with a maple leaf in its paw standing on a red-and-white wreath, all beneath the royal crown; the collar insignia is two crossed sabres. Some colonels, by nature of holding a specific appointment, may continue to wear the insignia of their personnel branch or regiment; for example, the honorary colonel of an infantry regiment. Air force colonels wear the badge of their personnel branch (most often the Air Operations Branch) on their headdress.

Colonels are addressed by rank and name; thereafter by subordinates as "Sir" or "Ma'am".

== Honorary ranks and appointments ==
There are also several honorary ranks and appointments associated with the rank of colonel, or containing the word "colonel" in their title.

- Colonel-in-chief
- Colonel of the regiment
- Honorary colonel
- Honorary lieutenant-colonel
- Colonel commandant

Each unit in the Reserve Army typically has an honorary colonel and Honorary lieutenant-colonel.

Personnel holding these honorary ranks are not part of the military operational chain of command. Rather, they serve in a ceremonial manner, often as a guest of honour at parades, mess dinners, or at other military traditions such as during Remembrance Day. Usually, honorary ranks are filled by people who have had a prior association with the battalion, regiment, or squadron they represent.

In 1895, John Morison Gibson, a provincial secretary in the Ontario Government, was the first individual to be appointed an honorary colonel, as an honorary lieutenant-colonel to the 13th Battalion of Infantry.

Princess Patricia of Connaught was the colonel-in-chief of Princess Patricia's Canadian Light Infantry, one of the most decorated infantry regiments in the Canadian Forces (CF). An honorary colonel of a CF flying or air maintenance squadron may be a past commanding officer of that squadron (who has since retired from active duty), or an air ace during the war.
