= Major (Canada) =

Officer rank of the Canadian Armed Forces

Major is a rank of the Canadian Armed Forces for officers who wear the army or air force uniform. It is equivalent to the rank of lieutenant-commander for officers who wear the navy uniform, and is the lowest rank of senior officer. A major is senior to a captain and junior to a lieutenant-colonel.

The rank insignia of a major in the Royal Canadian Air Force is two half-inch stripes with a quarter-inch stripe between. The rank insignia in the Canadian Army is a crown. Majors fill the positions of company/squadron/battery commanders, or deputy commanders of a battalion/regiment; in the Air Force they are typically squadron second-in-command, or commander of a detached helicopter flight embarked onboard Canadian naval vessels. The naval equivalent rank for major is lieutenant-commander.

Army uniform variations

Dress uniform tunic

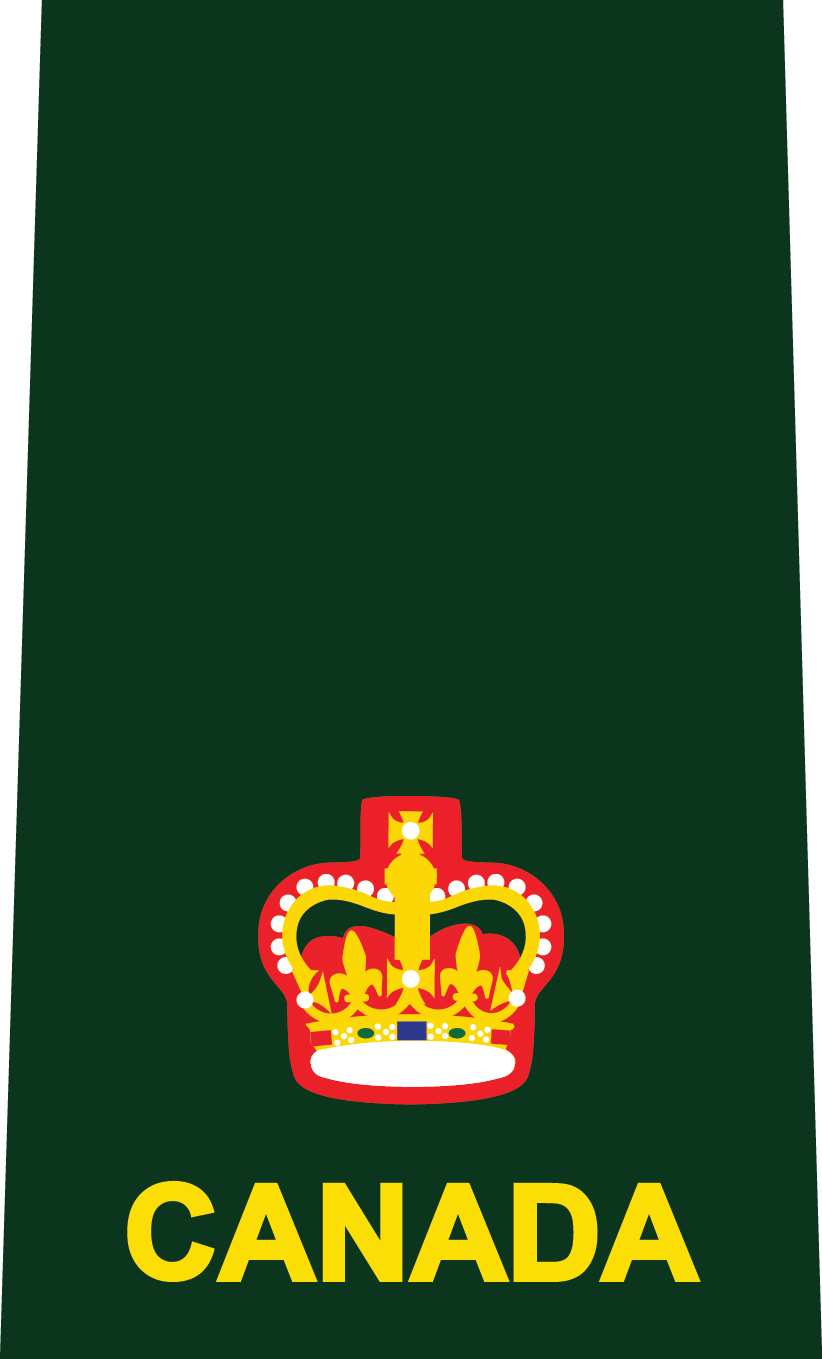
Uniform shirts

Olive green uniform (old insignia)

CADPAT uniform (old insignia)

Arid-region CADPAT uniform (old insignia)
Air Force uniform variations

Dress uniform tunic

Uniform shirts (old insignia)

CADPAT uniform
