= Lieutenant-colonel (Canada) =

Rank of the Canadian Armed Forces

In the Canadian Forces, lieutenant-colonel (LCol, French: lieutenant-colonel or lcol) is a rank for officers who wear army or air force uniform. It is equivalent to commander for officers who wear navy uniform and is the second-highest rank of senior officer. A lieutenant-colonel is senior to a major or lieutenant-commander, and junior to a colonel or naval captain.

The rank insignia for a lieutenant-colonel on air force uniforms is three 1-cm stripes of braid, worn on the cuffs of the service-dress jacket, and on slip-ons on other uniforms. On army uniforms, the rank insignia is one pip and a crown.

Lieutenant-colonels are addressed by rank and name and thereafter by subordinates as "Sir" or "Ma'am".

In the Canadian Army, lieutenant-colonels are often employed as commanding officers of battalion-sized groups, such as infantry battalions, armoured regiments, artillery field regiments, engineer field regiments, signal regiments, and service battalions.

In the Royal Canadian Air Force, lieutenant-colonels are often the commanding officer of flying or ground squadrons.

Before unification of the Canadian Forces in 1968, rank structure and insignia followed the British pattern.

Army uniform variations

Dress uniform tunic

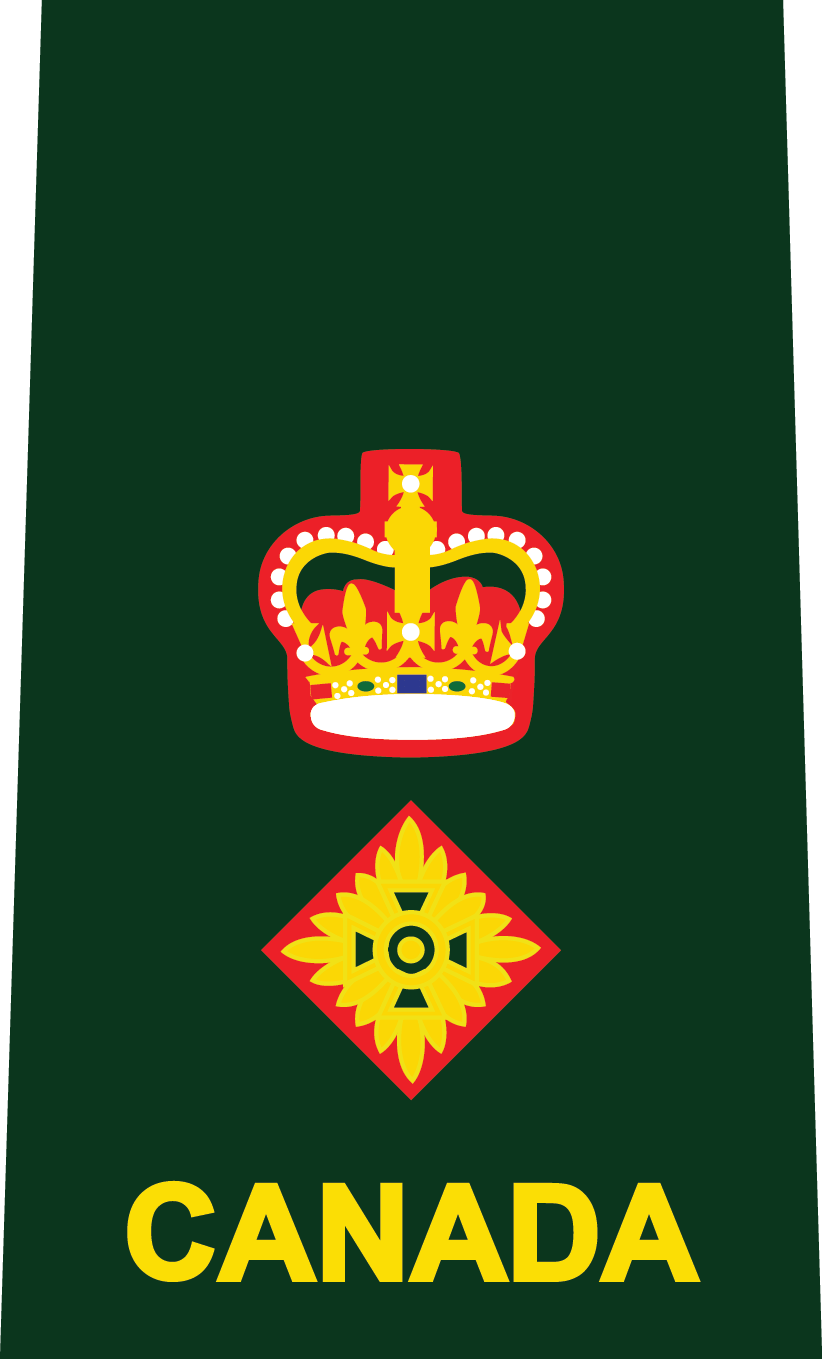
Uniform shirts

Olive green uniforms (old insignia)

CADPAT uniform (old insignia)

Arid-region CADPAT uniform (old insignia)
Air force uniform variations

Dress uniform tunic

Uniform shirts (old insignia)

CADPAT uniform
