= Victoria Cross (Canada) =

Military decoration of Canada

- The Canadian Victoria Cross, as appearing in a promotional photograph from the Canadian government, May 2008.
- Type: Military decoration
- Awarded for: The most conspicuous bravery, daring or pre-eminent acts of valour, self-sacrifice, or extreme devotion to duty in the presence of the enemy.
- Presented by: Governor general of Canada
- Eligibility: Members of the Canadian Armed Forces or an allied force serving with the Canadian Armed Forces on or after 1 January 1993.
- Post-nominals: VC
- Status: Currently awarded
- Established: 2 February 1993
- Created by: Elizabeth II on the advice of Prime Minister Brian Mulroney

Highlights
- Total recipients: 0
- Ribbon bars of the Victoria Cross (VC with Bar at bottom)

Precedence
- Next (lower): Cross of Valour

The Victoria Cross (VC; French: Croix de Victoria) was created in 1993, perpetuating the lineage of the British Victoria Cross, while serving as the highest award within the Canadian honours system, taking precedence over all other orders, decorations, and medals. It is awarded by the governor general of Canada to any member of the Canadian Armed Forces or allies serving under or with Canadian military command for extraordinary valour and devotion to duty while facing hostile forces. The British Victoria Cross was recommended prior to the creation of the Canadian medal. The previous Victoria Cross remains the highest award of the United Kingdom honours system and was also awarded in other Commonwealth countries; although most, including Canada, later established their own honours systems and no longer recommended British honours.

The Canadian Victoria Cross can be awarded for action against armed mutineers, pirates, or other such hostile forces whereas the conditions of the British Victoria Cross last recoded in 1961, "shall only be awarded for some daring and pre-eminent act of valour or self-sacrifice or extreme devotion to duty in the presence of the enemy". The warrants for neither the Canadian nor the British Victoria Cross require war to be officially declared. Recipients are entitled to use the post-nominal letters VC (for both English and French), but they do not receive an annuity for the award. The decoration has not been awarded since its inception.

== Origin ==
The original Victoria Cross was created by a Royal Warrant issued on 29 January 1856 with the royal sign-manual of Queen Victoria, and was intended to recognize demonstrations of gallantry during the Crimean War, regardless of either a man's social status or his record of service. Initially, the Victoria Cross could not be conferred on colonial troops, until Major Charles Heaphy received the medal for his actions while serving with a New Zealand militia unit in 1864. After this, the Victoria Cross was made available to all "local forces under imperial command." The cross could not be awarded posthumously but the policy was reversed in 1907.

Until 1972, 81 members of the Canadian military (including those from Newfoundland) and 13 Canadians serving in British units had been awarded the Victoria Cross. After that date, however, the Canadian honours system was overhauled, and the Victoria Cross was eliminated from the official list of honours, instigating a decades-long debate on whether or not to reinstate the decoration. The prime minister at the time, Pierre Trudeau, regularly dodged questions about the Victoria Cross, stating only that Canadians should receive Canadian decorations. In 1987, prime minister Brian Mulroney set up a committee to look into the creation of a Canadian Victoria Cross as part of a new series of military honours. Although the committee did not recommend the Victoria Cross—names such as the Canada Cross and the Cross of Military Valour were put forward—the creation of a Victoria Cross for Australia in 1991 and pressure from The Globe and Mail and advocacy groups, such as the Monarchist League of Canada and the Royal Canadian Legion, forced the plans to be amended. In 1991 a private member's bill received all-party support in the House of Commons, following which Mulroney formally advised the creation of the Victoria Cross, along with other Canadian military valour decorations, on 31 December 1992. The awards formally came into being with the issue of letters patent by Queen Elizabeth II on 2 February of the following year, thereby ceasing Canadian dependence (except for those honours and awards in the personal gift of the Sovereign) on the British honours system.

== Criteria ==
The Victoria Cross is awarded for "the most conspicuous bravery, a daring or pre-eminent act of valour or self-sacrifice or extreme devotion to duty, in the presence of the enemy" at any point after 1 January 1993. It may be presented posthumously. The main distinction between the Victoria Cross and the Cross of Valour is the specific reference to "the enemy", which the Canadian government has defined as a force hostile towards the Canadian Crown, including armed mutineers, rebels, rioters, and pirates. This means that the King-in-Council does not officially have to declare war to give acknowledgement of the existence of a hostile force that fits the official description. Thus, a Canadian serving as part of a peacekeeping operation is eligible to be awarded the Victoria Cross if the service member fulfils the above criteria.

In the case of a gallant and daring act having been performed by a squadron, ship's company, or detached body of individuals (such as a security detachment) in which all persons were deemed equally brave and deserving of the Victoria Cross, a ballot is to be drawn; the commissioned and Non-commissioned officers each select one of their own, and the private soldiers or seamen select from amongst themselves two individuals. (Note: Clause 13 of the original warrant constituting the Victoria Cross states: "It is ordained that in the event of a gallant and daring act having been performed by a squadron, ship's company, or detached body of seamen and marines not under fifty in number, or by a brigade, regiment, troop or company in which the admiral, general, or other officer commanding such forces may deem that all are equally brave and distinguished, and that no special selection can be made by them, then is such case the admiral, general, or other officer commanding, may direct that for any such body of seamen or marines, or for every troop or company of soldiers, one officer shall be selected by the officers engaged for the Decoration, and in like manner one petty officer or non-commissioned officer shall be selected by the petty officers and non-commissioned officers engaged, and two seamen or private soldiers or marines shall be selected by the seamen, or private soldiers, or marines engaged, respectively for the Decoration, and the names of those selected shall be transmitted by the senior officers in command of the Naval force, brigade, regiment, troop, or company, to the admiral or general officer commanding, who shall in due manner confer the Decoration as if the acts were done under his own eye.") This provision with modification is included in the current warrant but has not been used since the First World War.

The process of awarding the Victoria Cross may take place in two ways: One is through a recommendation by the Decorations and Commendations Advisory Committee, which is a part of the Department of National Defence and has six members, one appointed by the governor general and the rest by the chief of the Defence Staff. Alternatively, a field commander can submit a name for consideration, though permission must be obtained from the governor general before the award can be presented. Recipients are entitled to receive an annuity from the federal Canadian Crown; per the Canadian gallantry awards order issued in January 2005, members of the Canadian Armed Forces or those who joined the British forces while domiciled in Canada or Newfoundland prior to 31 March 1949, after receiving the Victoria Cross, be granted CA$3,000 each year. Previously, Canadians who were posthumously awarded the British Victoria Cross were given special headstones at their burial sites in Commonwealth War Graves and other cemeteries.

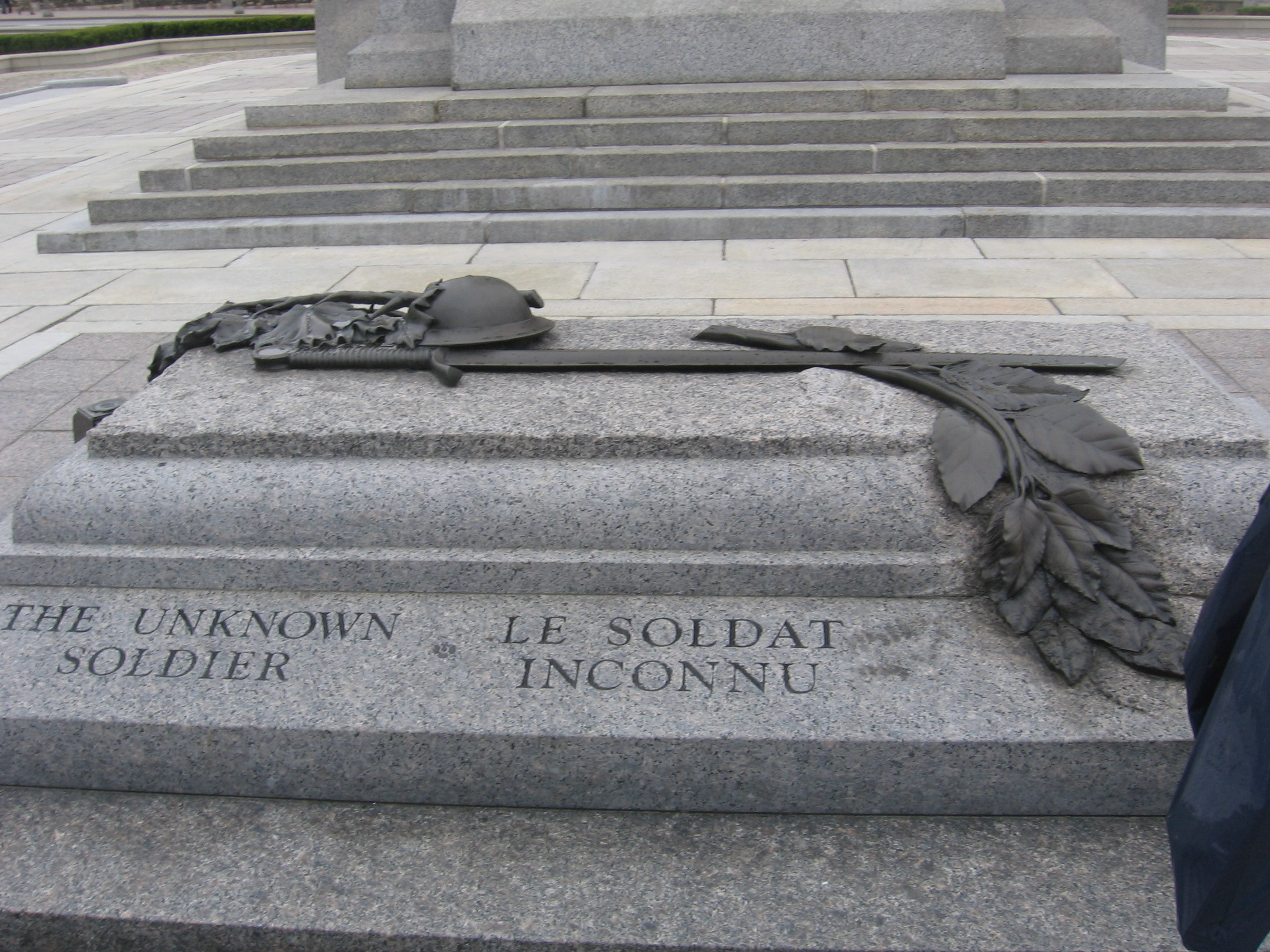
Close-up of the Canadian Tomb of the Unknown Soldier

To date, no Canadian Victoria Cross has been conferred; Smokey Smith, who died in 2005, was the last living Canadian recipient of the imperial Victoria Cross, personally receiving it from King George VI at Buckingham Palace in December 1944. The last action that resulted in a Canadian being awarded the Victoria Cross was to Lieutenant Robert Hampton Gray for gallantry on 9 August 1945, at Onagawa Bay, Miyagi Prefecture, Japan. The award was posthumously gazetted on 13 November 1945 although in the following five months, three additional awards to Canadians were gazetted for actions in 1941, 1942 and February 1945. Prior to Queen Elizabeth II's re-dedication of the Vimy Memorial on 7 April 2007, there was speculation she would present a Canadian Victoria Cross to her then-prime minister, Stephen Harper, offering it in recognition of the gallantry of the Unknown Soldier, as representative of all Canada's casualties of combat. The proposal was met with a mixed response from members of the Royal Canadian Legion and Canadian Armed Forces, detractors feeling that the Unknown Soldier should not be elevated above his other comrades killed in war. It had also been agreed at the time of the Unknown Soldier's repatriation that no award or decoration would be bestowed on the remains. No decision was taken about the awarding of the Victoria Cross to the Unknown Soldier.

Near the end of Canada's role in the Afghanistan War, concerns were raised about the stringency of the criteria that needed to be met to receive the Victoria Cross. Other countries with a Victoria Cross had awarded it numerous times since the end of the Second World War, some members of the Australian, New Zealand, and British armed forces receiving the decoration for their actions during the Afghan and Iraq wars of the 2000s. Members of the Canadian Armed Forces questioned why some actions by Canadians were deemed worthy only of the Star of Military Valour; citations for individuals who had received the imperial Victoria Cross during the First World War were very similar to those for Canadians who were presented with the Star of Military Valour during the war in Afghanistan. This led then Chief of the Defence Staff, Walter Natynczyk, to create a special committee to review the matter. The Department of National Defence's Directorate of Honours and Recognition explained concepts of war had changed since the mid-20th century and Canada had also developed a more elaborate honours system.

Beginning in 2021, a campaign was launched to award Jess Larochelle the medal, upgrading his Star of Military Valour. To date the campaign has been unsuccessful.

== Appearance and display ==
The medal, shown with a medal bar indicating a second award

The design of the Canadian medal is derived from that of the British original, which was the creation of Albert, Prince Consort, royal consort to Queen Victoria. Canada's Victoria Cross is thus a cross pattée with straight arms, 38 millimetres (1.5 in) across in each direction, and made out of bronze-coloured alloy, the obverse bearing a lion crowned and statant guardant, similar to that which forms the crest of the royal arms of Canada, standing upon a representation of St Edward's Crown, which itself rests above a semi-circular scroll. On the reverse is a raised circle for engraving the date of the act of gallantry along with the name, rank, and unit of the recipient. The medal is suspended from a link forming the letter V attached to a bar adorned on the front with laurel leaves, and on the reverse with the name, rank, and unit of the medal's recipient, all cast in the same metal as the medal. The ribbon, also 38 mm wide, is solid crimson in colour. Cathy Bursey-Sabourin, Fraser Herald of the Canadian Heraldic Authority, and Bruce W. Beatty, however, made certain modifications for the Canadian Victoria Cross, the most notable being the inclusion of Canadian flora as decoration and the alteration of the inscription on the scroll from for valour to the Latin translation, pro valore, so as to accommodate Canada's two official languages.

With Canada at war for the first time since its version of the Victoria Cross was created, preparations for a physical cast of the medal were initiated in 2006, when a committee called the Victoria Cross Production Planning Group was formed under the leadership of the Chancellery of Honours at Rideau Hall. It originally consisted of representatives from the Department of National Defence, Veterans Affairs Canada, and the Office of the Secretary to the Governor General of Canada, and the group later expanded to include individuals from the Department of Canadian Heritage, Natural Resources Canada, and the Royal Canadian Mint, with assistance provided by the Queen and the British Ministry of Defence. Following their research and deliberations, the first Victoria Cross decoration was struck in 2007, as confirmed by Deputy Herald Chancellor Emmanuelle Sajous, and the medal was officially released to the public on 16 May 2008 by Governor General Michaëlle Jean at Rideau Hall. It was one of 20 cast, each of which is composed of three groupings of metals: that of a Russian cannon captured at the siege of Sevastopol (1854–1855), donated by Queen Elizabeth II; a Confederation Medal, created to mark Canada's confederation in 1867; and a selection of metals from each of Canada's regions. (Note: According to Natural Resources Canada: "All British and Commonwealth Victoria Crosses reputedly include metal from a cannon captured during the Crimean War (1854–1856). The Canadian Victoria Cross also includes metal from the same cannon, as does one of Canada's Confederation Medals, produced in 1867. To reflect Canada's rich resource-based industries, commercially-made copper and other metals from Canadian sources were used. This was supplemented with naturally occurring copper from NRCan and private collections, representing all regions of Canada." The traditional explanation of the source of the gunmetal has been cast in doubt by the research of John Glanfield, which suggested a variety of origins for the British medals' materials.) These were cast, rather than struck, continuing the tradition started in the United Kingdom when it was found the metal alloy was too brittle for striking, and finished at the Royal Canadian Mint. The first two were sent to Buckingham Palace for addition to the British Royal Collection and other specimens were kept as part of the Crown Collection at Rideau Hall, as well as at the Department of National Defence, Library and Archives Canada, and the Canadian War Museum.

As the apex of the Canadian system of honours, the Victoria Cross is to be worn before all other Canadian decorations and insignia of orders, including the Order of Merit and the Order of Canada. It is worn as a medal, suspended from a medal bar on the left chest, unless protocol calls for a ribbon bar, which consists of a crimson ribbon with a miniature bronze Victoria Cross at its centre. Should an individual receive multiple awards of the Victoria Cross, additional bronze medal bars are added to the ribbon and further miniatures are placed evenly on the ribbon bar, reflecting the number of crosses the wearer has earned.
