= Canada in the War in Afghanistan =

Canada's role in the Afghanistan War began in late 2001. Canada sent its first element of soldiers secretly in October 2001 from Joint Task Force 2, and the first contingents of regular Canadian Armed Forces (CAF) troops arrived in Afghanistan in January–February 2002. The operations were aimed at identifying and neutralizing Al-Qaeda members in that country and toppling the Taliban regime which was supporting international terrorism. Canada's role in the Afghan conflict grew in 2006 when Canadian troops relieved US forces in Kandahar province, taking command of the multinational brigade in the region during a major Taliban offensive.

Later operations in Afghanistan focused on security, reconstruction, and training the Afghan National Army (ANA) and Afghan National Police. The CAF made up the bulk of these missions, supplemented by personnel from the Royal Canadian Mounted Police (RCMP), Foreign Affairs Canada, and the Canadian International Development Agency (CIDA). Major reconstruction projects included the Dahla Dam and irrigation system, improvement of roads and bridges, construction of schools, and immunization programs.

The CAF had the highest per-capita casualty rate among coalition members. 159 Canadian soldiers died on missions in theatre and another 22 died in non-combat circumstances. Public opposition to the war grew over time, and the financial cost of Canada's contribution to the war was estimated as high as $18.5 billion by 2011. The last CAF soldiers left Afghanistan in March 2014.

== Background ==
The Canadian Armed Forces' (CAF) role in post-Cold War conflicts has been that of a peacekeeping force, focused on new techniques to contain violence and restore functioning civil societies. After Canadian peacekeeping troops came under fire in the 1993 Medak Pocket incident—a 15-hour firefight during the Croatian War of Independence—it became clear to Canadian military leadership that the rules of engagement had to allow peacekeeping forces to make a rapid tactical transition to an offensive force when attacked. This notion shaped Canadian training and military operations in the subsequent decades.

In peacekeeping missions in Bosnia, Somalia, and Haiti, Canadian and NATO troops have sought to deepen their cooperation with local and international development organizations, working together towards reconstruction goals. The approach to Canadian involvement in Afghanistan was based on the same model.

In 2001, following the September 11 terrorist attacks and the US declaration of the war on terror, Canadian Minister of National Defence Art Eggleton advised Governor General Adrienne Clarkson to authorize more than 100 Canadian Forces members then serving on military exchange programs in the US and other countries to participate in US operations in Afghanistan. Eggleton summed up the dominant thinking in the government at the time: "Any Canadian military deployment to Afghanistan may well be similar to a situation in Eritrea and Ethiopia where we went in on the first wave, we helped establish the stabilization, the basis for ongoing peace support operations that would come after ... but then turned it over to somebody else." The operations were aimed at identifying and neutralizing Al-Qaeda members in that country, as well as toppling the Taliban regime, which was supporting international terrorism.

In addition to standard combat training, mission-specific training has been part of a Canadian soldier's preparation for service on peacekeeping, peacemaking, and stability operations since the 1960s. This played a significant role in the war in Afghanistan. Soldiers needed to be aware of local traditions, beliefs and social institutions, and why groups "might oppose the establishment of peace and order." This training, accompanied by psychological triaging with a soldier's family, made the Afghanistan deployment the most-prepared of any overseas CAF mission. There was a clear goal during training: that success of the mission was a sustainable Afghan government that could serve the needs of its peoples. It was this notion that shaped the Canadian and NATO approach toward reconstructing Afghanistan.

== 2001–2002: Operation Apollo, Initial deployment ==
General Ray Henault, Chief of the Defence Staff, issued preliminary orders to several CAF units as Operation Apollo was established. The Canadian commitment to US operations in Afghanistan was originally planned to last until October 2003.

Approximately 40 Joint Task Force 2 (JTF2) soldiers were sent to southern Afghanistan in early December 2001. The Canadian public was not informed of the deployment, and Sean M. Maloney's book Enduring the Freedom reported that JTF2 had been deployed without Prime Minister Jean Chrétien's knowledge in early October 2001. (Note: In October 2004, JTF2 received the US Navy Presidential Unit Citation as part of Task Force K-Bar, a multinational special-operations task force led by the US Navy SEALs that was decorated for its operations from 17 October 2001 through 30 March 2002.)

Regular forces arrived in Kandahar in January–February 2002. In March, three Princess Patricia's Canadian Light Infantry (PPCLI) snipers fought alongside US Army units during Operation Anaconda. During the operation the team twice broke the kill record for a long-distance sniper kill set during the Vietnam War. Operation Anaconda was also the first time since the Korean War that Canadian soldiers relieved American soldiers in a combat situation. Canadian forces also undertook Operation Harpoon in the Shah-i-Kot Valley. Other forces in the country provided garrison and security troops.

The Tarnak Farm incident occurred on 18 April 2002, when an American F-16 jet dropped a laser-guided bomb on a group of soldiers from the 3rd Battalion PPCLI Battle Group. The soldiers were conducting night-time training on a designated live-fire range, but the American pilots mistook their gunfire for a Taliban insurgent attack. The friendly fire incident killed four Canadians and wounded eight. Their deaths were the first Canadian deaths in Afghanistan, and the first in a combat zone since the Korean War.

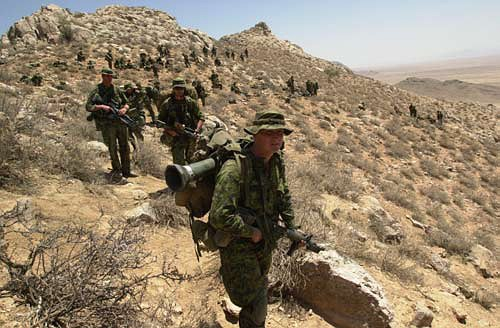
Canadian soldiers from 3PPCLI move into the hills to search for Al Qaeda and Taliban fighters after an air assault onto an objective north of Qalati Ghilji (July 2002)

== 2003–2005: Operation Athena ==
In August 2003, the Canadian Forces moved to the northern city of Kabul where it became the commanding station of the newly formed International Security Assistance Force (ISAF). Canada dubbed this Operation Athena and a 1,900-strong Canadian task force provided assistance for improving civilian infrastructure, such as well-digging and repair of local buildings.

In March 2004, Canada committed $250 million in aid to Afghanistan and $5 million to support the 2004 Afghan election.

On 13 February 2005, Defence Minister Bill Graham announced Canada was doubling the number of troops in Afghanistan by the coming summer, from 600 troops in Kabul to 1200.

In spring 2005, officials announced that the Canadian Forces would return to the volatile Kandahar Province, taking command of the region from US forces. Stage one of Operation Athena ended in December 2005 with the fulfillment of the stated aim of "rebuilding the democratic process" in Afghanistan.

== 2006: Operation Archer ==
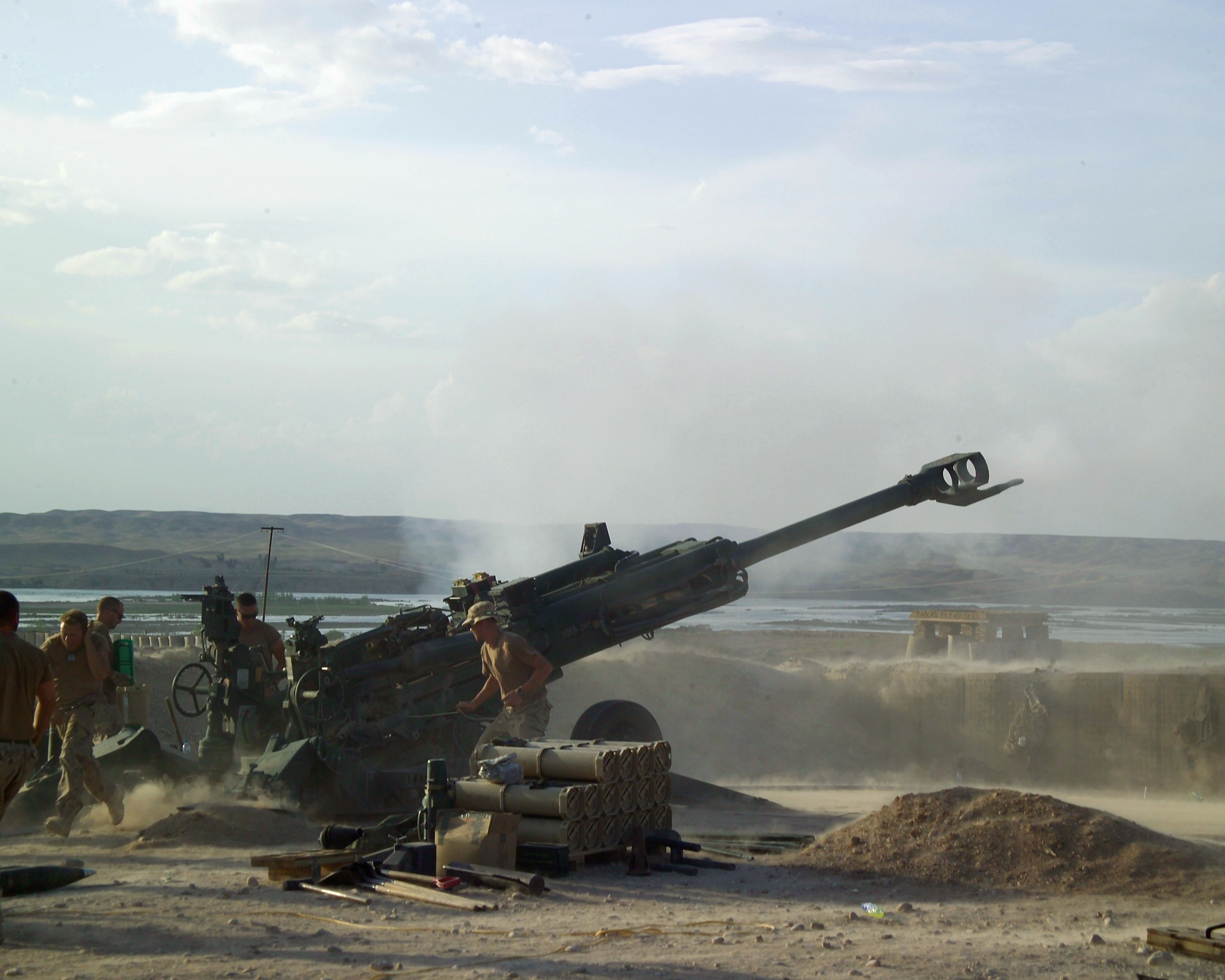
Canadian soldiers fire an M777 155 mm howitzer at Taliban fighting positions near the Sangin District Center.

Operation Archer followed Athena beginning in February 2006. Unlike the ISAF-led Athena, Archer was part of the US military command. By spring 2006, Canada had a major role in southern Afghanistan, with a battle group of 2,300 soldiers based at Kandahar. Canada also commanded the multinational brigade for Regional Command South, a main military force in the region, with Canadian Brigadier-General David Fraser formally taking over from US forces on 28 February. In May 2006, the Canadian government extended Canadian military commitments to Afghanistan by two years, replacing earlier plans to withdraw soldiers in 2006. Foreign Affairs Canada stated that the commitment would employ a "whole of government approach", in which the Provincial Reconstruction Team (PRT), utilizing personnel from the military, Foreign Affairs, the Canadian International Development Agency and the Royal Canadian Mounted Police (RCMP), would provide a dual role of security as well as reconstruction of the country and political structure.

On 31 July 2006, the NATO-led ISAF assumed command of the south of the country and the Canadian Task Force was transferred from the jurisdiction of Archer (Operation Enduring Freedom) to Athena (ISAF).

== 2006–2009: Taliban resurgence ==
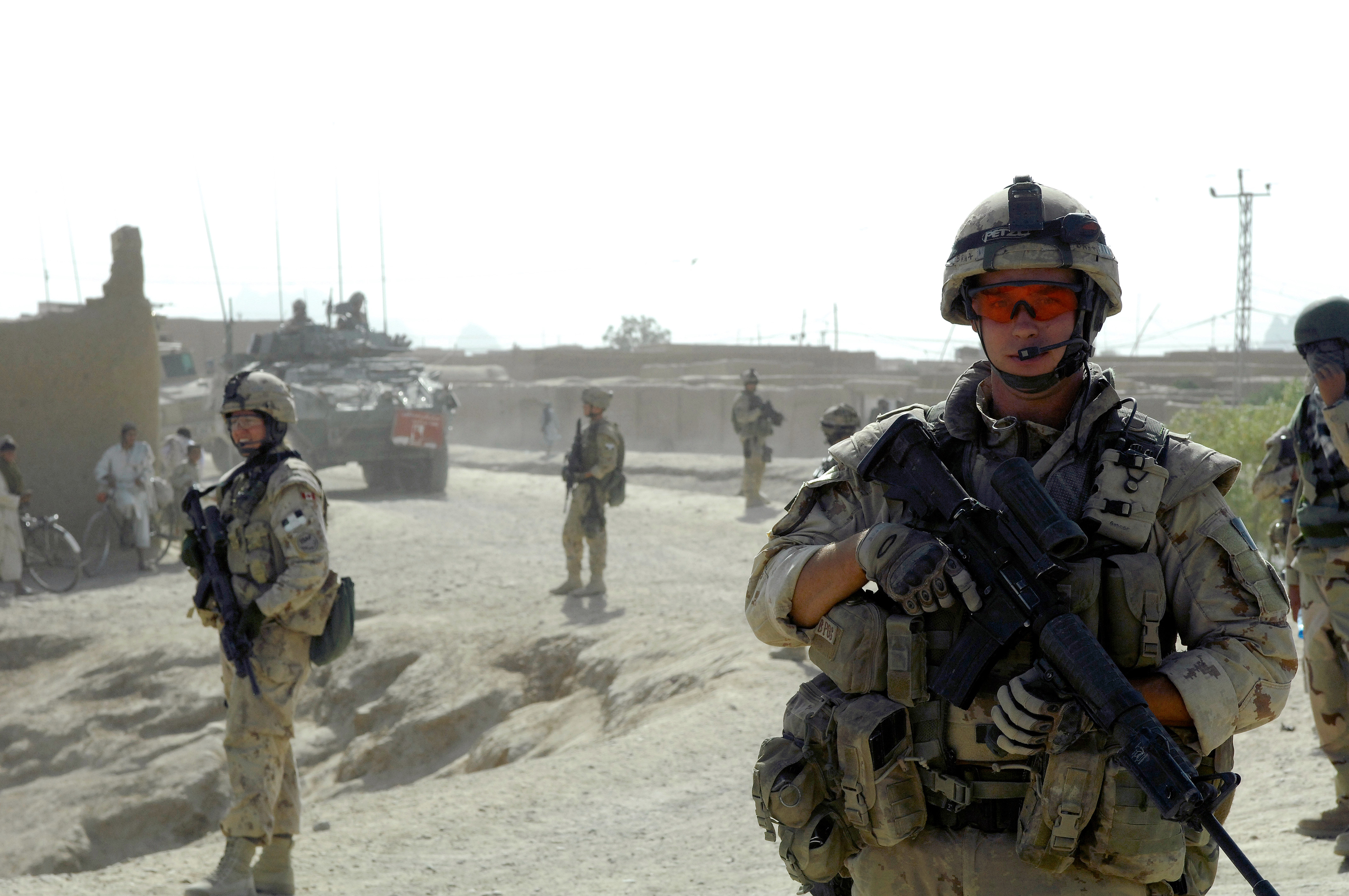
Kandahar Provincial Reconstruction Team (PRT) during a patrol

When Canadian Forces returned to Kandahar, the Taliban began a major offensive. There were a record number of attacks against Canadian soldiers that spring, including six deaths.

Operation Mountain Thrust was launched in the beginning of summer 2006, in response to the gathering of Taliban forces in Kandahar and Helmand provinces. Canadians of the 1 PPCLI Battle Group were one of the leading combatants and the first fighting when the Battle of Panjwaii took place. Daily firefights, artillery bombardments, and allied airstrikes turned the tides of the battle in favour of the Canadians. After the operation concluded, Taliban fighters returned to the Panjwai District in numbers that had not been seen before in a single area in the post-Anaconda war.

The Canadian Forces came under NATO command at the end of July, and the 1 RCR Battle Group replaced the PPCLI. Canadians launched Operation Medusa in September in an attempt to clear the areas of Taliban fighters from Panjwai. The fighting of Operation Medusa led to a second, fiercer Battle of Panjwai in which daily gun-battles, ambushes, and mortar and rocket attacks targeted the Canadian troops. An estimated 1,500 to 2,000 Taliban fighters were reluctant to give up the area, and after being surrounded by the Canadian Forces, they dug in and fought a conventional style battle. After weeks of fighting, the Taliban were cleared from the Panjwai area and Canadian reconstruction efforts began.

On 15 September 2006, the Canadian government committed a squadron of Leopard C2 tanks from Lord Strathcona's Horse and an additional 200 to 500 troops to Afghanistan.

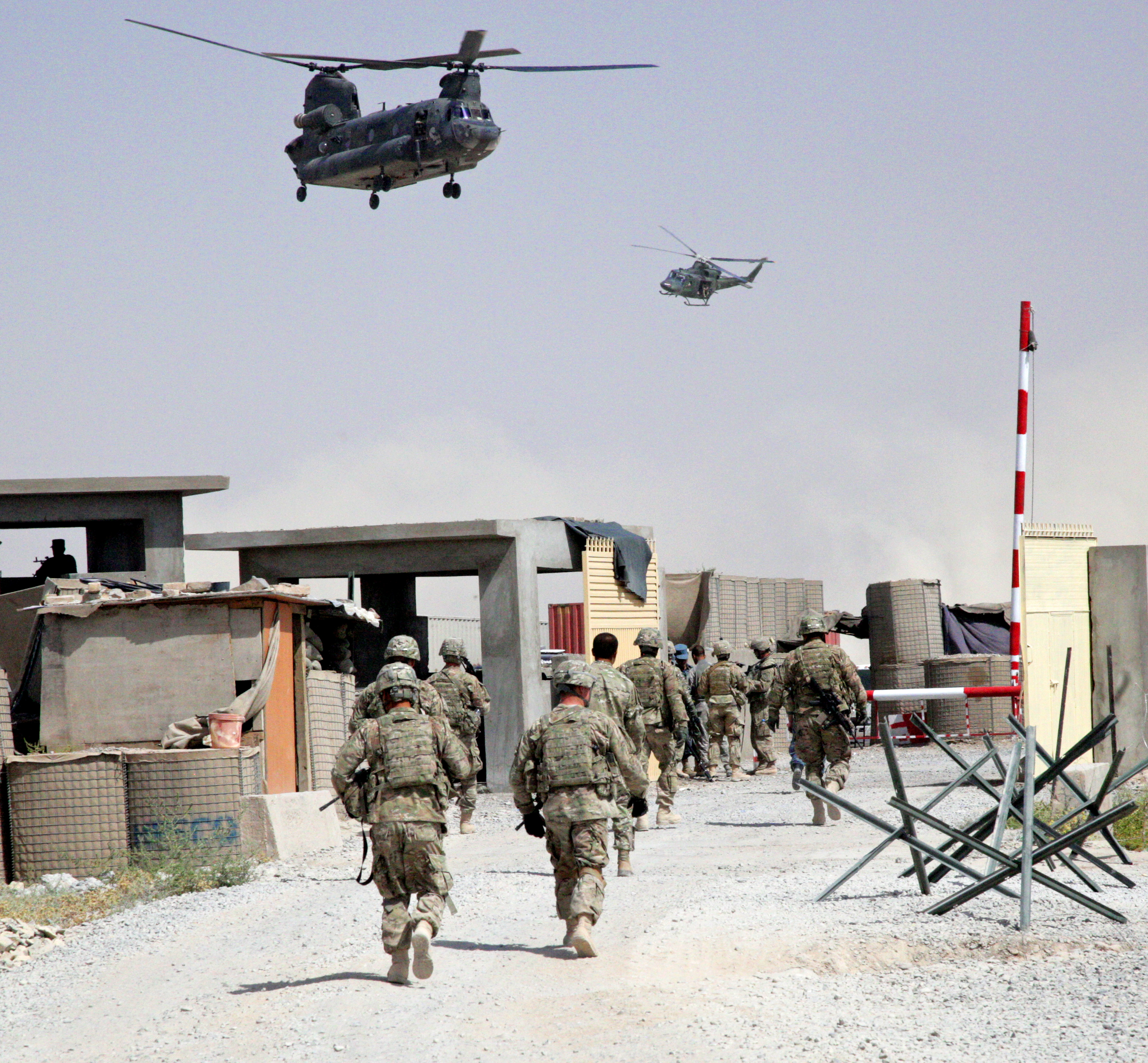
Canadian CH-147 and CH-146 over Daman District Center.

On 1 November 2006, Fraser stepped down as head of NATO Regional Command South, which was rotated to Dutch command.

On 15 December 2006, the Canadians launched Operation Falcon Summit into Zhari District, to the north of Panjwai, as part of the NATO-led Operation Mountain Fury. During Operation Falcon Summit, the Canadians gained control of several key villages and towns that were former Taliban havens, such as Howz-E Madad. During the first week of the operation, massive Canadian artillery and tank barrages were carried out in a successful attempt to clear pockets of Taliban resistance. The operation concluded with plans to build a new road linking Panjwai with Kandahar's Highway 1 that runs east–west through Zhari.

In February 2007, the 2 RCR Battle Group took over combat operations in several districts of Kandahar Province.

From 15 July 2007 to February 2008, units from CFB Valcartier near Quebec City served in Kandahar filling most positions in the Operational Mentoring and Liaison Team (OMLT) and providing the protective company for the Provincial Reconstruction Team (PRT). The 3rd Battalion Royal 22^{e} Régiment Battle Group, with supporting troops from 5 Canadian Mechanized Brigade Group and a composite tank squadron from Lord Strathcona's Horse conducted operations on the ground. This rotation reflected a change in tactics, with emphasis on systematically clearing, holding and building in the districts of Panjwai and Zhari, while also protecting Arghandab District and the Afghan–Pakistan border in the area of Spin Boldak. The focus was on intimately working with the Afghan army, police and civil administration to hold cleared areas rather than subsequently lose them to returning Taliban, as had previously occurred throughout the south and east.

In February 2008, the Van Doos contingent was replaced by a force centred on a PPCLI battle group. Also in February, Canadian Major-General Marc Lessard took command of Regional Command South for nine months.

On 13 March 2008, the Harper Conservative government's motion to extend the military mission past February 2009 into 2011 was approved in a parliamentary vote with the support of the Liberal opposition. The extension of almost another three years had a focus on reconstruction and training of Afghan troops, and set a firm pullout date, calling for Canadian troops to leave Afghanistan by December 2011. While the Liberals voted in favour of the Conservatives' confidence motion, the New Democratic Party and the Bloc Québécois voted against it, having consistently rejected any extension of the military mission. NDP leader Jack Layton said "There are millions of Canadians who don't want this strategy to continue. The population prefers a road to peace."

As part of the new US administration's policy on Afghanistan, 17,000 new US troops were deployed to the country with a third stationed in Kandahar province. On 10 August 2009, Brig-Gen. Jonathan Vance of Task Force Kandahar transferred the authority of some of Kandahar Province to Col. Harry Tunnell IV, commander of the US Army's 5th Stryker Brigade. Canadian troops were then stationed primarily around Kandahar City and the surrounding districts.

== 2010–2011: US surge, combat ends ==
On 1 December 2009, the US president announced a major troop increase that sent another 30,000 troops to Afghanistan. The Canadian troops remained mostly active in the Panjwai and Kandahar districts, where they were located at the end of 2009. Canadians were also active in the Zhari and Daman districts.

In February 2010, Canadian air forces and ground troops from 3PPCLI took part in the highly publicized Marja offensive. In early 2010, Task Force Kandahar also contributed to creating the 3rd brigade of the 205th Afghan National Army (ANA) Corps that was deployed in Kandahar and Helmand province. In April 2010 the 1st Battalion Royal Canadian Regiment (1RCR), along with O Company of the 3rd Battalion Royal Canadian Regiment (3RCR), was deployed to relieve PPCLI in the southern districts of Kandahar province. In late May 2010, heavy fighting ensued and continued for much of the summer. During this time, two major operations involving about 160 troops along with two platoons of ANA were conducted under the name Operation Azida 1 and Operation Azida 2. 7 Platoon 3RCR's involvement in the operations over three months confronted them with as many as 75 skirmishes with Taliban forces, and approximately 50–75 improvised explosive devices (IEDs) were found. On one occasion, a Chinook helicopter was struck in flight by an insurgent RPG. This resulted in a hard landing, and destruction of the helicopter, but with no reported serious injuries. The violent clashes and skirmishes continued through the end of August, leaving O Company 3RCR and their combat attachments with over a dozen serious injuries. Two weeks later Canadian Forces transferred Kandahar city to US forces, at which point most of Canada's forces were in the Panjwai district, Dand and Daman. On 27 November 2010, in the tenth and final troop rotation, the 1st Battalion of the Royal 22^{e} Régiment took over, marking the final rotation before Canada's withdrawal from Afghanistan.

Canada withdrew the bulk of its troops from Afghanistan in 2011, with the Infantry Battle Group withdrawn by the end of July (handover of battlespace was completed 6 July, and all Canadian Forces personnel and equipment were withdrawn from Kandahar by the end of December. In September 2008, Conservative leader Stephen Harper had pledged the withdrawal by saying that a decade at war is enough, having extended the withdrawal deadline twice previously. He acknowledged that neither the Canadian public nor the troops themselves had any appetite to stay in the war and said that only a small group of advisers might remain.

== 2011–2014: Operation Attention, NATO training mission and withdrawal ==
On 9 December 2010, it was announced that after the end of combat operations in July 2011, approximately 950 newly posted specialized CAF personnel would be posted to the NATO Training Mission-Afghanistan to continue the training of the ANA and Afghan National Police. CAF personnel also provided force protection, SECFOR and quick reaction force elements to the ISAF mission. Canada's contribution to this mission was dubbed Operation Attention and took place mostly around Kabul with some training occurring at Mazar-i-Sharif.

By late 2013, Canada began withdrawing its final soldiers from the training mission. In October, the force was down to 650 personnel from over 800. On 12 March 2014, the government announced with little fanfare that the mission was formally completed with a flag-lowering ceremony held in Kabul. The last 84 soldiers left Afghanistan on 15 March 2014, ending Canada's twelve-year military presence in the country.

== 2021: Operation Aegis ==
Members of Canadian Special Operations Forces Command were briefly redeployed to Afghanistan in August, during the August 2021 Taliban offensive. The Canadian military operation, Operation Aegis, aimed to evacuate its citizens, close the Canadian embassy, and help facilitate the 2021 Kabul airlift. After assisting with the evacuation of more than 3,700 people, the Canadian Armed Forces ended its airlift mission in Afghanistan on 26 August.

== Provincial reconstruction team ==
A key element of Canadian operations in Afghanistan was the Kandahar Provincial Reconstruction Team (KPRT), one of 25 provincial reconstruction teams (PRTs) throughout the country. These units were introduced by the US government to support reconstruction efforts in unstable states, performing duties ranging from humanitarian work to the training of police and the military. Following NATO's involvement, command of some PRTs was transferred from the US to other nations under the ISAF.

KPRT was comprised around 330–335 personnel, composed largely of Canadian Forces elements (315) and a few diplomats, correctional officers, development specialists, and Royal Canadian Mounted Police (RCMP). KPRT also included one US State Department official, one US development official, and several US police mentors.

By 2007, the Canadian effort to rebuild Kandahar was following the National Solidarity Program (NSP), a strategy to empower local village councils, shifting outlooks from essential self-preservation to community governance. This required much time and patience by KPRT, earning trust, with power gradually transitioning "from drug lords and Taliban chieftains back to Afghans".

Among the challenges was instilling a belief in good government, which required the training of an organised and professional police force.

The Canadian International Development Agency (CIDA) focused on improving irrigation systems during a ten-year drought, allowing farmers to open unused fields and radically increase crop production. The farmers also had to be lifted from the fear imposed by the drug lords and Taliban who exploited them. By 2007, the mission had convinced Kandaharis who joined in the reconstruction efforts despite a Taliban resurgence.

The PRT was about one-eighth of the total 2,830 Canadian military forces in Afghanistan. The 2008 Manley report recommended that the KPRT be given more funding and attention and be placed under civilian leadership. The KPRT was transferred to a civilian command in April 2010, with the Representative of Canada in Kandahar Ben Rowswell as KPRT Director and former US Ambassador Bill Harris as deputy director. With impending Canadian withdrawal in 2011 and an increasing number of US soldiers and civilians in Kandahar, the KPRT transitioned from Canadian to American command in late 2010 to early 2011.

== Major projects ==
Prompted by the Manley report, the Canadian Government highlighted several of its so-called "signature" projects in Kandahar Province:

- Dahla Dam and irrigation system: Canada invested $50 million over three years toward projects to assist with irrigation and basic services across the region. It was believed that such funding would create 10,000 seasonal jobs.
- Education: Canada invested $12 million over three years into improving the education system across Kandahar.
- Polio eradication: Canada invested up to $60 million over three years toward the immunization of an estimated seven million children across Afghanistan, including 350,000 in Kandahar province.

As a result of these signature projects, over 6,000 schools were built and six of thirteen million children were enrolled. Transportation infrastructure was greatly improved, providing much better access to healthcare. The NSP also saw tremendous progression in the Afghan government, with over 16,000 community development councils elected, prioritizing projects that suit local needs.

== Other operations ==
- Canada's naval contribution to the Afghanistan War was part of the American-led Combined Task Force 150 (CTF 150), whose purpose was maritime patrol and enforcement near Afghanistan. Canada's maritime forces served as part of Operation Apollo, Operation Altair, and Operation Saiph – the last having a greater focus on the Horn of Africa.
- The Canadian Security Intelligence Service (CSIS) increased activities abroad, including in support of Canada's participation in the war in Afghanistan. The executive director of its civilian oversight committee noted in January 2009 that this support had noticeably altered the spy agency and urged policy improvements to manage its growing operations overseas.
- Canada assisted in the collection, storage and decommissioning of 10,000 heavy weapons left in Afghanistan over decades of conflict, including artillery, tanks and rocket launchers.
- Canada helped clear about one third of the estimated 10 to 15 million mines in Afghanistan.
- Canada lent money to over 140,000 people in Afghanistan.
- Canada helped train the Afghan police and army.
- Since December 2001, Canada was an active participant in the civilian-led United Nations Assistance Mission in Afghanistan. The Canadian military terms it Operation ACCIUS.
- In September 2005, Canada initiated the Strategic Advisory Team – Afghanistan (SAT-A), known as Operation ARGUS, to mentor aspects of the Afghan government on defence issues. It usually contained around fifteen personnel and one CIDA official. The SAT-A had often been considered a pet project of Chief of Defense Staff Rick Hillier and was shut down in August 2008, a month after his retirement.
- Since early 2006, the Canadian Operational Mentoring and Liaison Team (OMLT) helped to train and equip the ANA to take over security from the coalition. OMLT's 200 personnel trained 1,000 Afghan soldiers at a time, and also had a subgroup to mentor the Afghan National Police.

== Public opinion ==
The mission to Afghanistan was politically controversial with the Canadian public: On 31 August 2006, New Democrat leader Jack Layton called for the withdrawal of Canadian troops from the south of Afghanistan, to begin immediately and soon afterwards pursue peace negotiations with the Taliban insurgents. He argued that the mission lacked clear objectives and measures of success and that the counter-insurgency operation was undermining reconstruction in Afghanistan. The Liberals and the governing Conservatives were generally supportive of the mission in Afghanistan. While initially in support of the war, the Bloc Québécois opposed any extension beyond the initial withdrawal date. Opinion amongst pundits and academics was generally divided along ideological lines, with left-leaning media outlets and think-tanks being against the war, and right-leaning publications and institutes being supportive.

Successive surveys conducted by various pollsters across the political spectrum suggest opposition to the war amongst the general public grew over time:

- At the end of 2001, a poll quoted by The Washington Post showed that 74% of Canadians supported the US-led war in Afghanistan.
- One year after the September 11 attacks, Ekos reported that a majority of Canadians still supported the participation of the Canadian military in Afghanistan, with only one in five opposing.
- In 2006, as Canada was expanding its presence in the country, a Strategic Counsel poll conducted for CTV News and The Globe and Mail suggested that a majority of Canadians opposed or were ambivalent to the War in Afghanistan, with 54% opposing. In Quebec, as much as 70% opposed the war, while in the West more Canadians were in support (49%) than opposed (45%).
- In May 2008, the Canadian mission was extended by recommendation of a report from John Manley, a national poll by Angus Reid Public Opinion suggested that 54% of Canadians thought the House of Commons was wrong, while 41% agreed; two months later, 58% opposed and 36% agreed. At that point, Canada had lost 86 soldiers in the war.
- In December 2009, public opinion on the War in Afghanistan stood at approximately the same numbers, with 53% opposing and 42% supporting the mission in Afghanistan. However, 66% were opposed to expanding Canada's role in the country, 28% were in support. At that point, Canada had lost 133 soldiers in the war.
- At the end of 2010, nine years after the initial invasion, the Canadian government decided to extend Canada's involvement until 2014; however the combat mission was ending in 2011, and the new mission involved 950 instructors to help train Afghan troops. According to a national poll conducted by Angus Reid, 48% of Canadians agreed with this decision, while 44% disagreed; however, 56% still opposed the military mission in the country.
- As the combat mission wrapped up, a poll conducted on 1570 Canadians in July 2011 for QMI Agency and Sun Media showed 30% of respondents felt the sacrifice was worthwhile, and 58% did not. The Léger poll also found that male respondents were more likely to feel the mission was worth the sacrifice than female respondents.

Many Canadians were vocal in their opposition to the war, and several protests were held by many anti-war groups, most of them organized under the Canadian Peace Alliance umbrella. In Quebec, some parliamentarians refused to stand in honour of soldiers visiting the National Assembly. Other Canadians were supportive of the mission, and more particularly of the troops. A grassroots phenomenon known as the Highway of Heroes that started in 2006 saw hundreds of local residents gathering along bridges to salute soldiers' remains travelling between CFB Trenton and the Coroner's office in Toronto. Some Canadians also participated in Red Fridays in honour of the soldiers.

== Fatalities ==
=== Military deaths ===
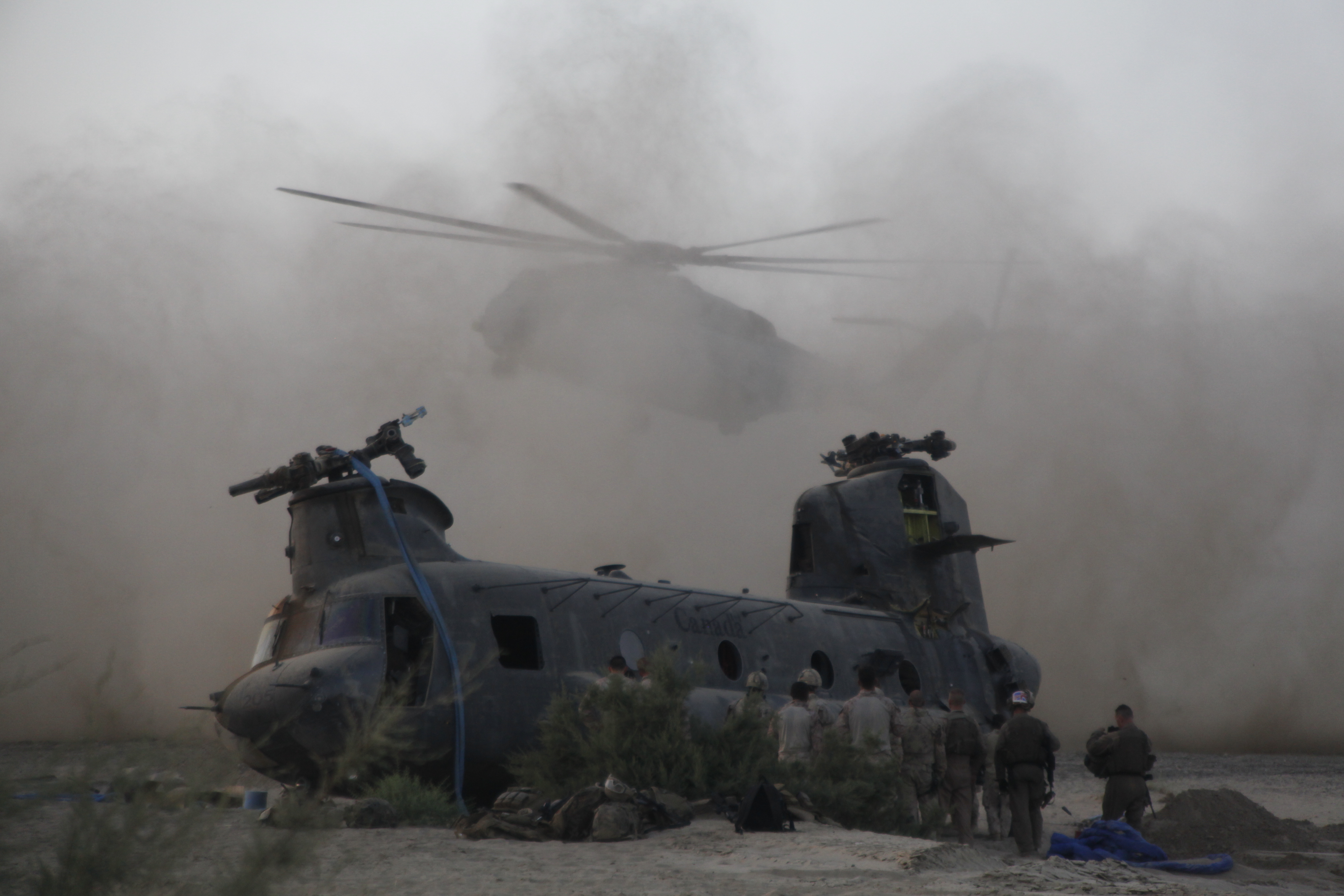
A US Marine CH-53E lands next to a downed Canadian CH-47 during tactical recovery of aircraft and personnel in Kandahar Province.

Between 2001 and 2014, 159 Canadian soldiers died while on missions in Afghanistan. (Note: The 159th CAF fatality was added in October 2015, when the Department of National Defence determined that a 2005 death was mission-related.) Of these, 123 were due to hostile circumstances, including 95 due to improvised explosive device (IED) or landmines, 21 due to rocket-propelled grenade, small arms or mortar fire, 11 due to suicide bomb attacks, and one died falling from a cliff during a combat operation that involved firefight. An additional 22 soldiers died in accidents or other non-combat circumstances; 7 due to friendly fire, 6 in vehicle crashes, 2 in a helicopter crash, 2 from accidental falls, 2 from accidental gunshots, 1 suicide death and 2 unspecified non-combat-related deaths in the country. Additionally, one unspecified non-combat-related death occurred at a support base in the Persian Gulf. Canada suffered the third-highest absolute number of deaths of any nation among the foreign military participants, and one of the highest casualties per capita of coalition members since the beginning of the war. More than 2000 soldiers were injured during the war between April 2002 and March 2014. 635 soldiers were injured in action while 1412 were injured in patrol or non-combat situations.

=== Non-military deaths ===
One senior Foreign Affairs official, Glyn Berry, and four Canadian civilians were killed in Afghanistan due to hostile circumstances.

Name	Hometown	Employment	Date	Circumstance
Glyn Berry	United Kingdom	Senior Foreign Affairs officer	15 Jan 2006	Died in a suicide attack while travelling in an armoured G-wagon.
Mike Frastacky	Vancouver, British Columbia	Civilian carpenter	23 Jul 2006	Shot and killed in Nahrin.
Jacqueline Kirk	Montreal, Quebec	Civilian aid worker	14 Aug 2008	Killed along with an American aid worker and their Afghan driver when the vehicle they were riding in was ambushed by gunmen while travelling between Gardez and Kabul.
Shirley Case	Williams Lake, British Columbia	Civilian aid worker	14 Aug 2008	Killed along with an American aid worker and their Afghan driver when the vehicle they were riding in was ambushed by gunmen while travelling between Gardez and Kabul.
Michelle Lang	Vancouver, British Columbia	Calgary Herald journalist	30 Dec 2009	Killed along with 4 Canadian soldiers when their vehicle was struck by an IED.

=== Military equipment lost or damaged ===
The Canadian Forces lost over 34 vehicles and 359 were damaged during the mission. The land force lost 13 LAV III and another 159 were damaged by roadside bombs or enemy fire. At least three Leopard C2 were destroyed and 15 were damaged. A dozen unspecified trucks in various sizes and models were damaged and seven were destroyed. A number of floodlight assembly trailers and kitchen trailers were destroyed during various rocket attacks against Kandahar International Airport. The majority of the equipment was destroyed by former CIA TC/3.6 and TC/6 anti tank mines left behind during the Soviet–Afghan War. From the beginning of the war in 2002 until 2009, the Canadian Forces had no heavy-lift helicopter for supplying forward operating bases (FOB) and had to do road convoys, which were regularly the target of IEDs. Canadian Forces also lost two helicopters, one Bell CH-146 Griffon and one CH-147 Chinook, hit by Taliban small arms fire.

== Unit recognition ==
Battle honours for the Afghanistan mission was bestowed in May 2014 to units of the Royal Canadian Navy, Canadian Army and Royal Canadian Air Force that participated. Fifteen RCN surface vessels received the theatre honour "Arabian Sea". The "Afghanistan" theatre honour went to two units of the RCN, 65 units of the Canadian Army, four units of the RCAF and one unit of the Special Forces.

Several units were recognized with the Commander-in-Chief Unit Commendation, including the 1st Battalion, The Royal Canadian Regiment, 1st Battalion, PPCLI, 3rd Battalion, PPCLI, and 3rd Battalion, Royal 22^{e} Régiment.

The Calgary Highlanders were awarded the Canadian Forces Unit Commendation for contributing more reserve soldiers to deployed units in Afghanistan than any other reserve unit. The unit deployed 107% of its established strength to the mission in Afghanistan, "significantly more than any other reserve unit".

== Individual valour and bravery awards ==
In March 2002, during operations in Afghanistan, Master Corporal Graham Ragsdale of the 3 PPCLI achieved over 20 confirmed kills using the upgraded C3A1 model. Over the first four years in Afghanistan, a number of decorations for bravery or for military merit were awarded to Canadian soldiers. Of particular note, in December 2003, four PPCLI snipers from 3 PPCLI were mentioned in dispatches by the Canadian Army and awarded the Bronze Star by the US Army for their actions in combat during Operation Anaconda, 2–11 March 2002. These were Master Corporal Graham Ragsdale, Master Corporal Tim McMeekin, Corporal Dennis Eason, Corporal Rob Furlong and Master Corporal Arron Perry.

The numbers of decorations being awarded increased when Canadian forces took over responsibility for Kandahar Province in 2006 and confronted an insurgency that was determined to regain control of the Pashtun heartland. During the period 2006–2011, Canadian forces came under fire from enemy forces for the first time since the Korean War and, because of this, 109 Decorations for Military Valour were awarded for the first time since the new system of decorations had been established in 1993. By the end of Operation Athena in 2011, the following awards had been made for courage "in the presence of the enemy":

- Star of Military Valour – 20
- Medal of Military Valour – 89
- Mentions in Despatches – 308

The first awards of Decorations for Military Valour were made in 2006 to members of 1 PPCLI Battle Group.

On 27 October 2006, Sergeant Patrick Tower of the PPCLI became the first recipient of the Canadian Star of Military Valour. It came as a result of actions on 3 August, where he assumed command of his platoon under fire, and escorted them to safety.

Sergeant Michael Thomas Victor Denine, PPCLI, was awarded the Medal of Military Valour for his actions as part of Operation Archer. On 17 May 2006, though under intense rocket-propelled grenade, machine gun and small arms fire, he exited a light armoured vehicle and manned the pintle-mounted machine gun. In spite of being completely exposed to enemy fire, Denine laid down such a volume of suppressive fire that he forced the enemy to withdraw.

On 24 May 2006, while under intense enemy fire, Master Corporal Collin Ryan Fitzgerald, PPCLI, entered and re-entered a burning platoon vehicle, driving it off the roadway and allowing vehicles trapped in the enemy's kill zone to break free, for which he was awarded the Medal of Military Valour.

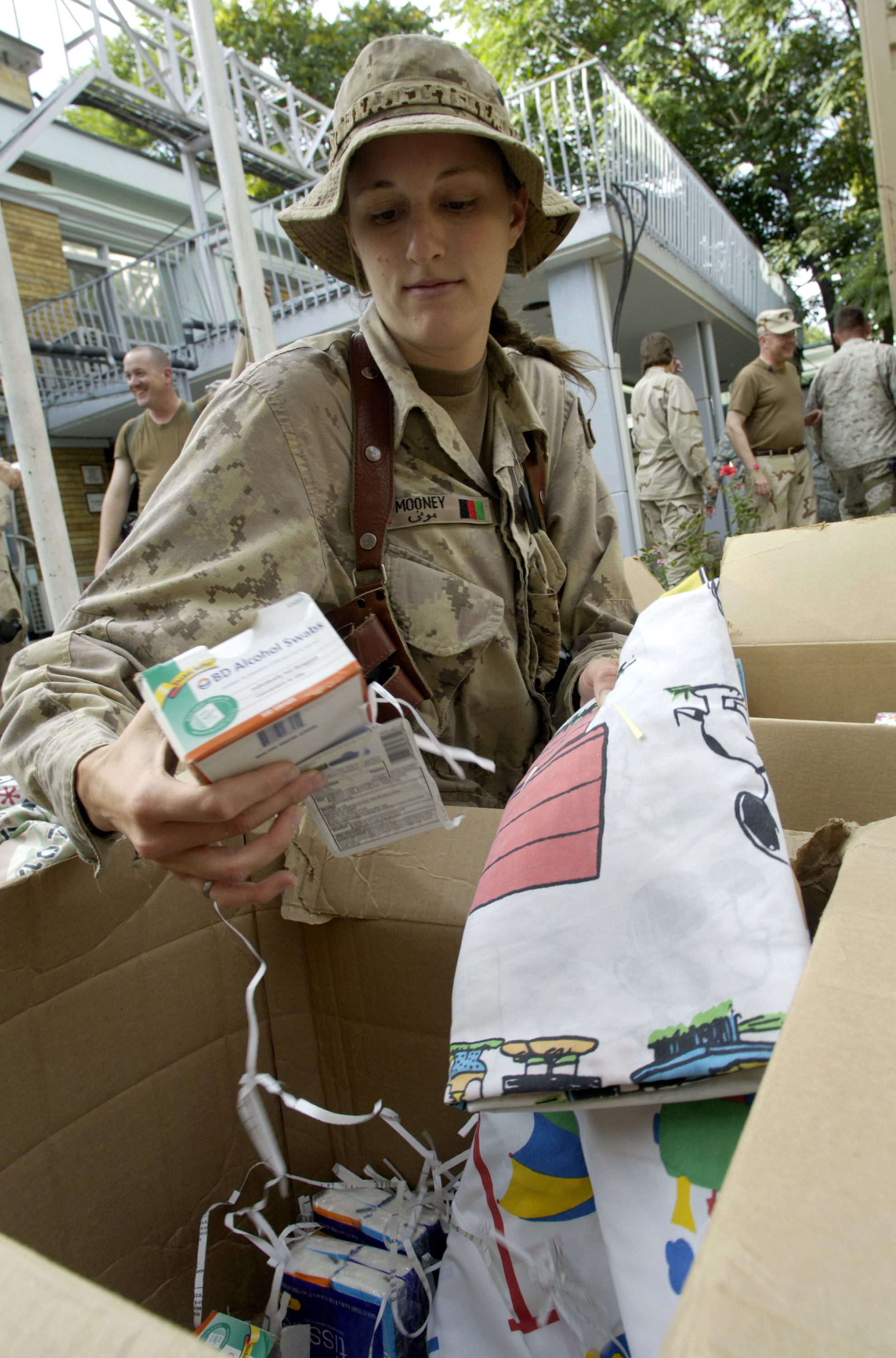
Canadian Navy Lt. Haley Mooney sorting donations sent from the United States to Camp Eggers, Kabul.

On 13 July, during Operation Archer, Private Jason Lamont, PPCLI, ran across open ground through concentrated enemy fire in order to deliver first aid to a wounded comrade, for which he was also awarded the Medal of Military Valour.

Major William Hilton Fletcher, PPCLI, received the Star of Military Valour. He was recognized for demonstrating extraordinary bravery during his service in Afghanistan from January to August 2006. He repeatedly exposed himself to intense fire while leading C Company, 1 PPCLI Battle Group, on foot, to assault heavily defended enemy positions.

Captain Derek Prohar, PPCLI, received the Medal of Military Valour. Assigned as liaison officer with US Special Forces in Afghanistan during the battle at Sperwan Ghar, 5–12 September 2006, Prohar operated as the rear machine gunner on the battalion commander's vehicle. He was wounded by an IED during an intense enemy ambush. Despite his injuries, he continued returning fire and assisted the commander with the control of the attack, which resulted in the successful seizing of key terrain.

Royal Air Force Flight Lieutenant Chris Hasler, a Canadian, was invested with the Distinguished Flying Cross personally by Queen Elizabeth II on 23 May 2007 for flying resupply missions under fire in Chinook helicopters in Afghanistan in 2006. He is the first Canadian to be decorated for bravery in the air since the Korean War.

At the end of 2006, every Canadian soldier was selected by the Canadian Press as the Canadian Newsmaker of the Year due to the war in Afghanistan.

Private Jess Larochelle was awarded the Star of Military Valour for his bravery. In 2021, a campaign was launched to award the first Canadian Victoria Cross, and focused on upgrading Private Larochelle's SMV to the VC, but as of 2024 the nomination has been denied.

== Controversies ==
=== Canadian soldier charged with second-degree murder ===
In late December 2008, reports surfaced of alleged inappropriate conduct concerning the death of a "presumed insurgent". The Canadian Forces National Investigation Service investigated the incident, resulting in second-degree murder charges against Captain Robert Semrau on 31 December. Semrau, who was serving with NATO's Operational Mentoring and Liaison Team supervising and mentoring Afghan soldiers in Helmand Provence, was alleged to have killed a wounded insurgent found by ANA troops on 19 October 2008. According to the "detention review synopsis" filed by the crown prosecutor, Afghan soldiers found a man whose wounds "appeared too severe for any type of treatment in situ" and disarmed him. The statement alleged that Semrau was seen near the wounded man when two shots were heard. The document stated the prosecution's belief that Semrau fired both shots, which resulted in the death of the insurgent. The prosecution also said that it would produce a witness who would testify that he saw Semrau shoot the wounded man. The body of the man was left behind at the scene of the ambush and was never found.

Court proceedings began on 25 January 2010, before a military judge and a five-person panel. On 19 July, Semrau was found not guilty of murder, attempted murder, and negligence, but guilty of disgraceful conduct. On 5 October, he was dismissed from the military and his rank was reduced to second lieutenant, but he was not sentenced to jail. Lieutenant-Colonel Jean-Guy Perron, explaining his sentencing, described Semrau as a courageous soldier and leader, and that he was "probably caught between his moral values and his duties as a soldier". He also said that Semrau had even more responsibility towards his duties because he was in a leadership position: "How can we expect our soldiers to respect the rules of engagement if our officers don't?" Semrau was interviewed for CBC Radio on the publication of his book, The Taliban Don't Wave.

=== Afghan detainee abuse scandal ===
In 2007, allegations arose that the Canadian military was handing detainees over to the Afghan military without first making sure that they would not be abused. This evolved into a political scandal in Canada that eventually resulted in Defense Minister Gordon O'Connor being demoted.

On 18 November 2009, allegations regarding the treatment of Taliban prisoners captured by Canadian forces in Afghanistan resurfaced in parliamentary testimony by Richard Colvin, the second highest-ranked member of Canada's diplomatic service in Afghanistan from 2006 to 2007. Colvin testified that "According to our information, the likelihood is that all the Afghans we handed over were tortured. For interrogators in Kandahar, it was a standard operating procedure." Colvin also testified that he had made numerous reports to both the Department of Defence and the Foreign Affairs Department about the situation, starting in 2006. Defense Minister Peter MacKay responded to the allegations saying "I don't believe it's credible. I don't believe it's backed up by fact and what we have to deal with in a parliamentary hearing, as we do in a court of law, or another judicial or public inquiry, is evidence that can be substantiated".

== Financial cost ==
The estimated cost of continuing Canadian operations in Afghanistan is the subject of considerable debate. Initial government estimates for the period 2001 to 2009 were as low as $9 billion according to Foreign Affairs Minister Peter MacKay in June 2006, but later government estimates of the incremental cost of the conflict (as distinct from the fixed cost of DND operations unrelated to Afghanistan) increased to $5 billion in March 2008 due to equipment purchases.

Independent estimates of the total cost of the conflict range as high as $18.5 billion by 2011, according to the Parliamentary Budget Officer. The discrepancy between this and government estimates lies in the difficulty in distinguishing between routine military costs and those dedicated specifically to the Afghan conflict, as well as the inclusion of long-term costs relating to injured soldiers and estimated lost productivity caused by personnel afflicted with operational stress injuries, such as post-traumatic stress disorder.

== Bases ==
- Camp Julien in Kabul
- Camp Nathan Smith in Kandahar
- Camp Mirage airbase, a logistics base outside of Afghanistan (taken down after UAE airline dispute)

== Equipment ==
=== Effect on CAF Equipment ===
Canada's effort in Afghanistan had a noticeable effect on some of the CAF's equipment holdings. The most obvious areas were: tactical aviation, UAVs, and main battle tanks (MBT).

During and following the war, Canada's tactical aviation evolved from solely using utility versions of the CH-146 Griffon to using a mix of CH-47 Chinook and CH-146 Griffon, the latter of which often act as armed escorts.

The many-year effort to provide the CAF with UAVs came to fruition with the deployment of the SAGEM Sperwer to Kabul and then to Kandahar.

The fighting in Kandahar, notably during Operation Medusa, led the CAF to abandon its plan to transition to a wheeled, lightly armoured, 105mm-armed Armoured Combat Vehicle (see Tanks of Canada) instead of its Leopard 1 MBTs. Instead, it replaced the Leopard 1 with the Leopard 2 MBT.

=== Relevant equipment ===
TYPE	MODEL
UAV	IAI Heron
UAV	AeroVironment RQ-11 Raven
UAV	SAGEM Sperwer
Heavy-duty truck	Mercedes-Benz Actros
Transport helicopter	Mil Mi-17
Heavy-lift helicopter	CH-47 Chinook
Tactical helicopter	CH-146 Griffon
Transport helicopter	Mil Mi-8
Main battle tank	Leopard 2
Main battle tank	Leopard C2
Armoured recovery vehicle (ARV)	Taurus
Armoured engineering vehicle (AER)	Badger
Demining vehicle	Aardvark JSFU
Mine detection vehicle	Chubby (mine detection system)
Mine-resistant infantry mobility vehicle (IMF)	RG-31 Nyala
Mine-resistant ambush protected vehicle	Cougar (MRAP)
All-terrain tracked vehicle	Bandvagn 206
Mine-resistant clearance vehicle	Buffalo (mine protected vehicle)
Light armoured patrol vehicle	Mercedes-Benz G-Class
Light utility vehicle	M-Gator
Howitzer	M777 155mm Howitzer
Infantry fighting vehicle	LAV-III
Armoured personnel carrier	Bison (armoured personnel carrier)
Light reconnaissance vehicle	Coyote Reconnaissance Vehicle
Armoured heavy-duty truck	Armoured Heavy Support Vehicle System (AHSVS)
Anti-tank	Carl Gustaf 8.4cm recoilless rifle
Light anti-tank	M72 LAW
SACLOS anti-tank	Eryx

== Diplomatic ties ==
On 25 January 2002, Canada officially re-established diplomatic relations with Afghanistan. This was followed by the opening of Canada's embassy in Kabul in September 2003. Canada's current representative is Ambassador Francois Rivest.

== In popular culture ==
The movie Hyena Road revolves around a group of Canadian soldiers from Princess Patricia's Canadian Light Infantry (PPCLI) fighting the Taliban while surrounded by the political, tribal, and military complexities of Kandahar Province. The novelization, based on the screenplay by Paul Gross, was published in 2015.

== See also ==
- Afghanada
- Afghan War order of battle
- Operation Herrick
- Canadian Afghan detainee issue
- Canadian Forces casualties in Afghanistan
- Civilian casualties in the war in Afghanistan (2001–2021)
- International public opinion on the war in Afghanistan
- Protests against the war in Afghanistan
- Rana FM
