= Louise Blais =

Canadian diplomat

Her Excellency Louise Blais

Deputy Permanent Representative to the United Nations
- In office September 2017 – March 2021

Personal details
- Born: July 1, 1966 (age 60) Quebec City, Quebec, Canada
- Education: McGill University
- Profession: Civil Servant

Louise Blais (born July 1, 1966) worked as a Canadian diplomat for 25 years. After serving in various capacities in the Canadian government, she was named as Ambassador and Deputy Permanent Representative to the United Nations on August 21, 2017, with special responsibility for Agenda 2030 and development.

In 2022, Blais was named to The Hill Times' list of top 50 people influencing Canada's foreign policy. She was also named a senior adviser with the Business Council of Canada in 2022.

On January 8, 2019, she was appointed to the executive board of UNICEF for the period spanning 2019.

Blais served as Consul General of Canada to the US Southeast, based in Atlanta, from 2014 to 2017. She later returned to work in the region in an interim capacity during the latter half of 2021.

Prior to becoming Head of Mission, she was the director of the Canadian Cultural Centre in Paris from 2007 to 2011 and later served as Minister-Counsellor at the embassy. She was previously a Counsellor in Tokyo and Washington D.C.

Blais is a graduate of McGill University.
