= Patrick Tower =

Recipient of the Star of Military Valour

Patrick Tower, SMV, CD
- Born: 22 February; Halifax, Nova Scotia
- Military career
- Allegiance: Canada
- Branch: Canadian Army
- Rank: Warrant Officer
- Unit: Princess Patricia's Canadian Light Infantry
- Conflicts: Croatian War of Independence: Battle of Medal Pocket; War in Afghanistan: Battle of Panjwaii
- Awards: Star of Military Valour Canadian Peacekeeping Service Medal NATO Medal South-West Asia Service Medal Canadian Forces' Decoration

Warrant Officer Patrick Tower, SMV, CD is a Canadian soldier who was the first recipient of the Star of Military Valour, a Canadian military decoration, in recognition of actions under enemy fire taken in the Pashmul region of Afghanistan. He had prior military service including the Battle of Medak Pocket and three tours in the former Yugoslavia with Canadian peacekeeping forces.

During the Panjwayi fighting in the summer of 2006, Tower was a section commander in 9 Platoon of the 1st Battalion, Princess Patricia's Canadian Light Infantry but by 3 August 2006, "(c)asualties had elevated (Tower) to second-in-command of the platoon of about thirty soldiers of Charlie Company who had been fighting that day."

The citation for his Star of Military Valour reads:

Sergeant Patrick Tower, S.M.V., C.D.
Edmonton, Alberta, and Victoria, British Columbia
Star of Military Valour

Sergeant Tower is recognized for valiant actions taken on August 3, 2006, in the Pashmul region of Afghanistan. Following an enemy strike against an outlying friendly position that resulted in numerous casualties, Sergeant Tower assembled the platoon medic and a third soldier and led them across 150 metres of open terrain, under heavy enemy fire, to render assistance. On learning that the acting platoon commander had perished, Sergeant Tower assumed command and led the successful extraction of the force under continuous small arms and rocket-propelled grenade fire. Sergeant Tower’s courage and selfless devotion to duty contributed directly to the survival of the remaining platoon members.
