= Manley report =

Parliamentary report on status of Canada's role in the invasion of Afghanistan

The Manley report, also known as the report of the Independent Panel on Canada's Future Role in Afghanistan, is a parliamentary report on the status of Canada in the War in Afghanistan. The report was transmitted in January 2008 to the Federal government of Canada by The Independent Panel on Canada's Future Role in Afghanistan. The chair of the panel was John Manley, who was joined by Derek Burney, Jake Epp, Paul Tellier, and Pamela Wallin.

== History ==
Approaching the upcoming expiry of Canada's NATO commitment in Afghanistan in February 2009, on October 12, 2007, Prime Minister Stephen Harper announced the creation of a non-partisan five-person panel that would advise the federal government on the upcoming strategy of the Canadian government in terms of Canada's involvement in Afghanistan. He announced the five members would be Derek Burney, former ambassador to the United States and Chief of Staff for Brian Mulroney; Jake Epp, former conservative cabinet minister; Paul Tellier, former CEO of Bombardier Inc. and Canadian National Railway and former clerk of the Privy Council; Pamela Wallin, former television journalist and Canada's consul general in New York City; and John Manley, former Deputy Prime Minister and Liberal Member of Parliament. Manley would serve as the chair of the panel.

The goal of the panel was to analyze four main options for Canada's future involvement in Afghanistan:

- Focus on military and police training in Kandahar with the goal of creating sustainable Afghan security forces allowing for Canadian withdrawal in February 2009;
- Focus on rebuilding the infrastructure of Kandahar, transitioning away from a security-focused role;
- Leave Kandahar and move to another Afghan region;
- Completely withdraw security forces after February 2009 excluding security for Canadian diplomats and aid workers.

Harper tasked the panel with considering all available options, but expressed that Parliament would inevitably make the decision.

The report was published in January 2008, and it recommended that Canada should extend their security presence in Afghanistan until "the Afghan National Army is ready to provide security in Kandahar province." However, it stressed a desire for Canada to shift to an approach that focused more on training, infrastructure-reconstruction, and diplomacy, and expressed hope for other NATO-members to provide combat relief to enable Canada to do so.
