= Rana FM =

Sub language radio station in regions

Ownership
- Owner: Canadian Forces

History
- First air date: January 6, 2007-July 2011
- Former frequencies: 88.5 MHz FM (Kandahar); 99.9 MHz FM (Kabul)

Links
- Website: ranafm.org (now cybersquatted)

Rana FM was a Pashto-language broadcast radio station operating from studios in an undisclosed location in Kingston, Ontario, feeding transmitters in Kandahar and Kabul, Afghanistan.

== History ==
Launched on January 6, 2007 during the ongoing 2001 Afghan war, the military-run station hired Afghan-Canadians as its on-air voices, presenting Bollywood and modern Afghan music, news, sports and public affairs programming with a distinct pro-NATO, anti-Taliban slant. Content was targeted at a 15- to 25-year-old demographic and included no commercial advertising.

The station was available as over-the-air FM radio in Afghanistan, via satellite (Eutelsat 70B, 70.5°E, 11210 MHz, horizontal, DVB-S, 6509 kilobits/second), and streamed online. Its signal was delivered to Afghanistan via satellite and fibre-optic links.

As Canada's role in the Afghanistan War had largely ended by 2011, the station was no longer on the air.

Filmmaker Ariel Nasr's full-length documentary describing Rana FM, "Good Morning Kandahar", aired on November 11, 2008, on CBC Newsworld and won the National Film Board of Canada Reel Diversity Competition.

== See also ==
- Radio stations in Afghanistan
- Radio Free Afghanistan
- CFB Kingston
