= John Manley =

Canadian politician (born 1950)

The Honourable John Manley PC CC
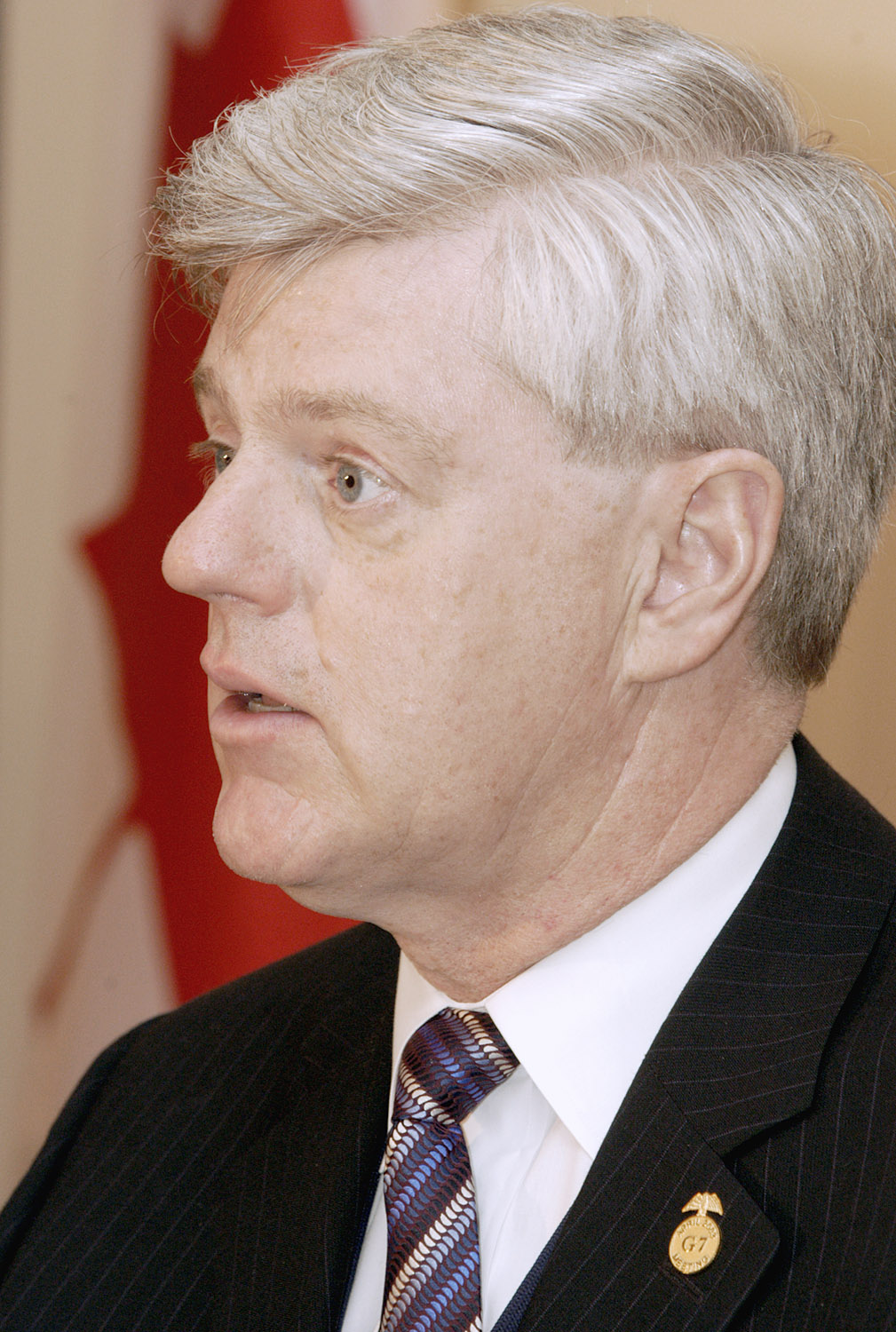
- Manley in 2003

8th Deputy Prime Minister of Canada
- In office January 15, 2002 – December 11, 2003
- Prime Minister: Jean Chrétien
- Preceded by: Herb Gray
- Succeeded by: Anne McLellan

Minister of Finance
- In office June 2, 2002 – December 11, 2003
- Prime Minister: Jean Chrétien
- Preceded by: Paul Martin
- Succeeded by: Ralph Goodale

Minister of Foreign Affairs
- In office October 17, 2000 – January 14, 2002
- Prime Minister: Jean Chrétien
- Preceded by: Lloyd Axworthy
- Succeeded by: Bill Graham

Minister of Industry
- In office November 4, 1993 – October 16, 2000
- Prime Minister: Jean Chrétien
- Preceded by: Jean Charest
- Succeeded by: Brian Tobin

Member of Parliament for Ottawa South
- In office November 21, 1988 – June 27, 2004
- Preceded by: Barry Turner
- Succeeded by: David McGuinty

Personal details
- Born: John Paul Manley; January 5, 1950 (age 76) Ottawa, Ontario, Canada
- Party: Liberal
- Education: University of Ottawa
- Profession: Barrister; solicitor; teacher

John Paul Manley (born January 5, 1950) is a Canadian lawyer, businessman, and politician who served as the eighth deputy prime minister of Canada from 2002 to 2003. He was Liberal Member of Parliament for Ottawa South from 1988 to 2004.

As foreign minister during the September 11 attacks, Manley worked to address U.S. security while maintaining economic ties between the U.S. and Canada. He chaired a special cabinet committee on security, and he was responsible for the Smart Border Declaration. For this work, Manley was named Canada's Newsmaker of the Year by Time magazine in 2001.

Although a prominent Liberal, Manley was appointed by Conservative prime minister Stephen Harper in 2007 to head an independent, non-partisan panel reviewing Canada's mission and future role in Afghanistan. Most of the recommendations of the Independent Panel on Canada's Future Role in Afghanistan (the "Manley report") were accepted, including an extension of the mission beyond February 2009 while calling for more soldiers and equipment.

From January 2010 to October 2018 Manley was president and CEO of the Business Council of Canada. He has held directorships of the Canadian Imperial Bank of Commerce (CIBC), CAE Inc., Telus Communications, and the Canadian Pacific Railway. Manley served as Chair of Ontario's Royal Commission on Electric Power planning following the northeast blackout of 2003. He serves on the advisory board of the Leaders' Debates Commission.

== Early life and education ==
Manley was born in Ottawa, Ontario, and attended Bell High School. He received a BA from Carleton University in 1971 and an LL.B. from the University of Ottawa in 1976. He also studied at the University of Lausanne. Manley was called to the Ontario bar in 1978.

After law school Manley clerked under Bora Laskin, the chief justice of Canada. He joined the Ottawa firm Perley, Robertson, Panet, Hill and McDougall, specializing in tax law.

== Cabinet career ==
John Manley was first elected as a Member of Parliament in the 1988 election. When the Liberals came to power under Jean Chrétien following the 1993 election he became minister of industry. During his time in industry, Manley was a staunch supporter of Canada-based research and development, and also of increased technology use in public schools. In particular, he felt that the so-called "wired classroom" would help to equalize the gap between urban and smaller, rural schools. These initiatives were partially aimed at combating the "brain drain", and Manley himself stated that "Canada needs to pursue policies that will make it a magnet for brains, attracting them from elsewhere and retaining the ones we have." As Industry Minister, in January 2000 Manley proposed a multimillion-dollar rescue package for cash-strapped Canadian National Hockey League teams, but withdrew the proposal within 48 hours following criticism that there were better uses for public funds.

Manley was appointed minister of foreign affairs in 2000. He was responsible for the establishment of the Smart Border Declaration, a proactive strategy to address Canada-U.S. security issues following the September 11 attacks in 2001. Manley's approach addressed American security concerns without severing economic ties, which not only averted economic disaster for Canada, but also helped the U.S. since closure of the border would have magnified the negative impact of the 9/11 attacks.

In October 2001, Manley was named chairman of a special cabinet committee on security that revamped immigration rules, antiterrorism laws, regulations on arrest and detention, and border procedures. Manley's assertive responses helped to keep the "hugely complex relationship with the U.S. on an even keel" as Washington dealt with terrorist threats. Manley had good working relationships with U.S. Secretary of State Colin Powell and U.S. Homeland Security chief Tom Ridge, and the director of Toronto's Canadian Institute of Strategic Studies said "Under Manley, the government of Canada talks to Washington, not at it." For his work to "orchestrate a transformative moment in Canada's history", Manley was named Canada's Newsmaker of the Year by Time magazine in 2001.

In January 2002 Manley was appointed deputy prime minister and given special responsibility for security in response to 9/11. In May 2002, Chrétien appointed Manley as minister of finance, following the departure of Paul Martin. Manley's 2003 federal budget laid out billions of dollars in new spending, primarily for health-care, child-care, and First Nations. It also introduced new accountability features to help limit federal waste.

== Liberal leadership ==
=== 2003 Liberal leadership election ===
When Jean Chrétien announced his decision to retire, Manley was seen by many as the prime minister's logical successor given his roles as deputy prime minister and as chair of the important economic and social policy cabinet committees. However, Manley withdrew from the leadership race and endorsed Paul Martin in July 2003 when it became clear that Martin had an overwhelming lead. Martin offered Manley a role as Ambassador to the United States, which Manley declined for personal and family reasons. Later in 2003, Manley announced his retirement from politics.

=== 2006 and 2009 Liberal leadership elections ===
On January 25, 2006 Manley sent a letter to supporters indicating that he was not going to contest the Liberal leadership after the resignation of Paul Martin. Martin had resigned after the January 23, 2006 election resulted in a Conservative Party minority in parliament.

Manley was mentioned again as a possible contender for the leadership of the Liberal Party after Stéphane Dion's resignation following the October 14, 2008 election that resulted in a larger minority Conservative government. On November 4, 2008 Manley announced that he would not be a candidate.

== Membership on commissions and inquiries ==
=== Report on Canada's Mission in Afghanistan ===
On October 12, 2007, Manley was appointed by Conservative prime minister Stephen Harper to head an independent, non-partisan panel reviewing Canada's mission and future role in Afghanistan, a position he had discussed with Liberal leader Stéphane Dion beforehand. Both Dion and Liberal Foreign Affairs critic Bob Rae had encouraging words for the panel. Manley's appointment was described as a "masterstroke" in an editorial in The Globe and Mail, given Manley's evident qualifications as a former foreign minister and former chairman of a cabinet committee on public security and anti-terrorism established after 9/11. Also, by appointing a prominent Liberal, bipartisan support could be built for what was originally a Liberal-mandated mission.

The Independent Panel on Canada's Future Role in Afghanistan reported on January 28, 2008, in what became known as the Manley report. It argued for an indefinite extension of the mission beyond February 2009, but also pointed to logistical and equipment shortfalls, communications challenges with telling the mission's story to Canadians, and a coming manpower strength shortage. The report's recommendations were accepted by the House when the Liberals backed them along with the Conservatives.

=== Other public service advisory roles ===
Manley served as Chair of Ontario's Royal Commission on Electric Power Planning in the wake of the eastern North American blackout of 2003.

Manley was co-chair of the Independent Task Force on the Future of North America, a project of the U.S.-based Council on Foreign Relations. In 2005, the Task Force released a report that advocated a North American "economic and security community" by 2010, the boundaries of which would be defined by a common external tariff and an outer security perimeter. The three-country economic area would resemble the European Community, a predecessor of the European Union.

Manley has served as Chair of the Advisory Council of the Canadian Global Affairs Institute, a Fellow of the C.D. Howe Institute, and as Chair of the Canadian branch of the Trilateral Commission. He is a member of the International Advisory Council of the Brookings Institution and the Global Advisory Council of the Wilson Center.

Manley is a member of the advisory board of the Leaders' Debates Commission. He has served on the boards of the not-for-profits CARE Canada, MaRS, the National Arts Centre Foundation, the University of Waterloo, the Conference Board of Canada, and the Institute for Research on Public Policy.

== Private sector positions ==
On May 18, 2004, Manley joined the law firm McCarthy Tétrault as counsel, working in their Toronto and Ottawa offices. In September 2019, he joined law firm Bennett Jones as a Senior Business Advisor as part of the Governmental Affairs & Public Policy group.

From 2010 to 2018, Manley was President and CEO of the not-for-profit Business Council of Canada.

John Manley has served as Chair of the Boards of Directors of Nortel, CIBC, CAE Inc. and Telus Communications, and as a member of the Board of Directors of the Canadian Pacific Railway.

== Political ideology ==
Globe and Mail political columnist Lawrence Martin said Manley is "a broad-perspective pragmatist, who, while spending a lot of time with the Bay Street boys (you do that as an industry minister), has never been captive to them."

In an interview for the British think-tank The Bruges Group, Manley said of then-prime minister Justin Trudeau's economic spending priorities: "I see commitments on spending programmes that will not necessarily add to Canada's productivity or support economic growth – so I'm one that's a bit worried about the trajectory that we are on".

Manley is an advocate for the abolition of the Canadian monarchy. This point of view created quite a controversy when, in response to a reporter's question, he stated "I don't think it's necessary for Canada to continue with the monarchy" during a 2002 tour of Canada by the Queen. Manley served as the queen's official government escort when her 12-day tour concluded in the national capital region.

== Honours and awards ==
Manley is a Companion of the Order of Canada.

Manley holds honorary doctorates from the University of Ottawa, Carleton University, the University of Toronto, Western University, the University of Windsor and York University.

== Personal life ==
Manley is married to Judith Manley with whom he has three children.

Manley is an avid marathon runner.

He lives in Ottawa and Rideau Lakes.

== Electoral record ==
1988 Canadian federal election
Party	Candidate	Votes	%	±%	Expenditures
Liberal	John Manley	27,740	50.9	+14.2	$60,329
Progressive Conservative	Barry Turner	19,134	35.1	−10.0	$43,380
New Democratic	John Fryer	7,392	13.6	−3.2	$42,207
Libertarian	Marc A. Shindler	146	0.3	–	
Commonwealth of Canada	Jack C. Chambers	90	0.2	–	
Independent	Charles Boylan	54	0.1	–	
Difference		8,606	15.8		
Valid votes		54,502			

1993 Canadian federal election
Party	Candidate	Votes	%	±%	Expenditures
Liberal	John Manley	35,705	66.3	+15.4	$116,684
Reform	Doug Walkinshaw	7,749	14.4	n/a	$46,281
Progressive Conservative	Joe Anton	6,580	12.2	−22.9	$18,730
New Democratic	Ursule Critoph	2,116	3.9	−9.7	$39,876
National	George Shirreff	1,024	1.9	n/a"	
Green	Joe Palmer	391	0.7	n/a	
Natural Law	Ronald J. D. Parker	243	0.5	n/a	
Marxist–Leninist	Louise Waldman	140	0.1	n/a	
Difference		27,956	51.9		
Valid votes		53,875			

1997 Canadian federal election
Party	Candidate	Votes	%	±%	Expenditures
Liberal	John Manley	31,725	59.0	−7.3	$50,315
Reform	Carla Marie Dancey	8,522	15.9	+1.5	$24,092
Progressive Conservative	Keith Beardsley	8,115	15.1	+2.9	$23,773
New Democratic	Marcella Munro	4,374	8.2	+4.3	$23,462
Green	Maria Von Fickenstein	440	0.8	+0.1	$0
Canadian Action	Paula Williams	281	0.5	n/a	$1,364
Natural Law	Richard Michael Wolfson	167	0.3	−0.2	$0
Marxist–Leninist	Anna di Carlo	140	0.3	+0.2	$0
Difference		23,203	43.2	−8.7	
Rejected Ballots		382	0.7		
Turnout		54,146	72.3		

2000 Canadian federal election
Party	Candidate	Votes	%	±%	Expenditures
Liberal	John Manley	26,585	51.3	−7.7	$51,901
Alliance	Brad Darbyson	12,677	24.5	+8.6	$40,183
Progressive Conservative	Kevin Lister	8,096	15.6	+0.4	$23,923
New Democratic	Jeannie Page	3,463	6.7	−1.5	$11,522
Marijuana	Ron Whalen	679	1.3	n/a	
Natural Law	James Hea	141	0.3	0.0	
Marxist–Leninist	Marsha Fine	80	0.2	−0.1	
Communist	Mick Panesar	69	0.1	n/a	$246
Difference		13,908	26.9	−16.3	
Rejected Ballots		231	0.4	−0.3	
Turnout		52,021	62.0	−10.3	

26th Canadian Ministry (1993–2003) – Cabinet of Jean Chrétien
Cabinet posts (9)
Predecessor	Office	Successor
Herb Gray	Deputy Prime Minister of Canada; 2002–2003	Anne McLellan
Paul Martin	Minister of Finance; 2002–2003	Ralph Goodale
position created	Minister of Infrastructure and Crown Corporations; 2002; NB: "Minister of Infrastructure" for final two months	position abolished
Lloyd Axworthy	Minister of Foreign Affairs; 2000–2002	Bill Graham
David Dingwall	Minister for the Atlantic Canada Opportunities Agency; 1996–2000	Brian Tobin
Lloyd Axworthy	Minister of Western Economic Diversification; 1996–2000	Brian Tobin
legislation enacted	Minister of Industry; 1995–2000	Brian Tobin
Jean Charest	Minister of Industry, Science and Technology; 1993–1995 styled as Minister of Industry	legislation enacted
Jean Charest	Minister of Consumer and Corporate Affairs; 1993–1995 styled as Minister of Industry	legislation enacted
Special Cabinet Responsibilities
Predecessor	Title	Successor
Paul Martin	Minister responsible for the Economic Development Agency of Canada for the Regions of Quebec; 1996–2000; NB: "Minister responsible for the Federal Office of Regional Development – Quebec" before 1998	Brian Tobin
Parliament of Canada
Preceded by Federal Riding Created in 1987 * See also the ridings of: Ottawa Centre, Ottawa—Carleton and Ottawa—Vanier	Member of Parliament for Ottawa South; 1988–2004	Succeeded by David McGuinty
