= Jess Larochelle =

Canadian war hero

Private Jess Larochelle SMV
- Born: 10 November 1982; Restoule, Ontario, Canada
- Died: 30 August 2023 (aged 40); Nipissing, Ontario, Canada
- Military career
- Allegiance: Canada
- Branch: Canadian Army
- Service years: 2001–2007
- Rank: Private
- Units: 1st Battalion, Royal Canadian Regiment
- Conflicts: War in Afghanistan: Operation Medusa; Battle of Pashmul
- Awards: Star of Military Valour; General Campaign Star

Jess Randall Larochelle SMV (November 10, 1982 - August 30, 2023) was a Canadian soldier who was awarded the Star of Military Valour for bravery in the War in Afghanistan in 2006. A campaign was launched in 2021 to lobby for an upgrade of his award to the Canadian Victoria Cross and as of 2026 remains ongoing.

== Early life ==
Jess Randall Larochelle was born in 1982 in Restoule, Ontario, the son of Randall Larochelle and Anna Guitard. His maternal grandfather fought in the Korean War as a sergeant in the Royal Canadian Artillery. He had one brother, Andrew Larochelle.

Upon graduating from high school, Larochelle joined the Canadian Army, serving with the 1st Battalion, Royal Canadian Regiment.

== War in Afghanistan ==
Larochelle was deployed to Afghanistan in 2006, serving with 9 Platoon, Charles Company, 1st Battalion, Royal Canadian Regiment. He took part in combat operations around Kandahar, including Operation Medusa.

=== Battle of Pashmul ===
On October 14, 2006, Jess Larochelle was manning an observation post on Charles Company's flank. The company was positioned around Pashmul, guarding a road between two Canadian bases. Larochelle was the machine gunner for the observation post.

Around 3 p.m., the company was attacked by a force of over 50 Taliban, who were equipped with rocket-propelled grenades and small arms weapons. The forward observation post took a direct hit and Larochelle was wounded, briefly losing consciousness. When he awoke, he discovered that two men of his company, Sergeant Darcy Tedford and Private Blake Williamson, were dead and three more had been wounded. Larochelle was seriously injured in the initial attack, with broken vertebrae in his neck and back, a detached retina in one of his eyes and a blown eardrum. Though he was partially deaf and had limited eyesight, Larochelle mounted a swift and aggressive defence of the OP, firing his machine gun he quickly ran out of ammunition. He then began firing M72 rocket launchers at the enemy, firing fifteen 66-mm rockets at a force of about 20–40 Taliban insurgents heavily armed with rifles, light machine guns and rocket-propelled grenades.

Larochelle's actions helped protect his wounded comrades and hindered the Taliban attack. He provided covering fire on the company's flank, which was otherwise undefended, and his counterattack bought the company enough time to mount a secure defence of the post. The Taliban were forced to withdraw, and were unable to significantly attack their main target which was the rifle company base.

== Recovery ==
Larochelle was treated for his serious wounds, and on March 14, 2007, he was awarded the Star of Military Valour, Canada's second highest medal of bravery, for his actions during the battle. His citation reads:

On October 14, 2006, Private Larochelle of the 1st Royal Canadian Regiment Battle Group was manning an observation post when it was destroyed by an enemy rocket in Pashmul, Afghanistan. Although he was alone, severely injured, and under sustained enemy fire in his exposed position at the ruined observation post, he aggressively provided covering fire over the otherwise undefended flank of his company’s position. While two members of the personnel were killed and three others were wounded in the initial attack, Private Larochelle’s heroic actions permitted the remainder of the company to defend their battle positions and to successfully fend off the sustained attack of more than 20 insurgents. His valiant conduct saved the lives of many members of his company.

He was later discharged from the Canadian Army for the wounds he incurred that day. For the rest of his life, his health was poor. He also had Post-traumatic stress disorder.

== Victoria Cross campaign ==
The last living Canadian recipient of the Victoria Cross was Smokey Smith, for his actions during the Second World War, and since the creation of the Canadian Victoria Cross no one has been awarded the medal.

Beginning in September 2021, a private campaign was initiated to find a Canadian war hero whose bravery merited the award of the Victoria Cross. Out of a number of recipients of the Star of Military Valour, Larochelle was determined by popular vote to deserve the upgrade and award. Numerous petitions were circulated and supported by tens of thousands of Canadians, many of them veterans, including General Rick Hillier, and the matter was taken up in Parliament, but despite overwhelming bi-partisan support, the government determined that no upgrade or award of the VC would occur. A subsequent petition will be introduced into the House of Commons in 2026 by Pauline Rochefort.

Jess Larochelle had been suffering from medical complications due to his injuries for many years, and he died on August 30, 2023, near Nipissing, Ontario. Following his death there was a resurgence of the campaign to award him a posthumous Victoria Cross. Noted medal historian Hugh Halliday argued that retroactively upgrading awards of other valour medals like the Star of Military Valour would create a "new class of VC" that had been cheapened.
