= Business Council of Canada =

Non-partisan advocacy organization

Business Council of Canada (BCC)
- Predecessor: Business Council on National Issues (BCNI)
- Formation: 1976
- Website: BCC website
- Formerly called: Canadian Council of Chief Executives (CCCE)

Business Council of Canada (BCC) is an advocacy organization formerly known as the Canadian Council of Chief Executives (CCCE). It was established in 1976 as the Business Council on National Issues (BCNI). Its members include CEOs of Canada's leading companies and pre-eminent entrepreneurs. BCC (and its iterations as BCNI and CCCE) has been described as "Canada's most powerful lobby group" with Thomas d'Aquino, "Canada's number-one free-market conservative," as CEO for almost three decades, until his resignation in 2009.

== Board of directors ==
In 2018, Goldy Hyder succeeded John Manley as the president and CEO of the Business Council of Canada, who had been in the position since Thomas d'Aquino stepped down in 2009.

== Membership ==
According to a January 2016 BCC article, members of the "40-year-old organization" are "CEOs of 150 leading Canadian companies and pre-eminent entrepreneurs of 150 leading Canadian companies" that "employ 1.4 million Canadians, account for more than half the value of the Toronto Stock Exchange, contribute the largest share of federal corporate taxes, and are responsible for most of Canada's exports, corporate philanthropy, and private-sector investments in research and development."

== History ==
The Canadian Council of Chief Executives (CCCE), renamed Business Council of Canada in 2016, was originally known as the Business Council on National Issues (BCNI) when it formed in the 1976.

=== Tenure of Thomas d'Aquino (1981-2009) ===
In 1981, when Thomas d'Aquino was named as Business Council on National Issues's CEO, "not many companies were truly global players. The vast majority were inward-looking. As a result of globalization and free trade, we have considerably more companies that are truly global." He was 40-years-old and most of the CEO's were ten or twenty years older than he was.

In 1981, the Business Council on National Issues (BCNI) — which then represented approximately 140 major corporations across Canada and represented "well over $125 billion in annual sales" — commissioned a booklet entitled "A Citizen's Guide to the Constitutional Question." This was submitted to the Special Joint Committee on the Constitution (SJC), a special joint committee of the House of Commons of Canada and the Senate of Canada to receive submissions regarding the patriation of the Constitution of Canada. The Citizen's Guide was accompanied by a letter, in which the BCNI advocated for the protection of economic rights, including "property rights, rights to due process and to just compensation", "not just to individuals or citizens, but to all persons, including corporate persons." The called for "mobility rights", the right to "move goods, services, capital, entrepreneurship, freely within the territorial boundaries of Canada." In the name of economic efficiency, the BCNI called for the elimination of internal barriers to trade in order to be competitive. They wrote that, the "preservation of relatively free inter-provincial trade within the Canadian federation is essential to the economic welfare of all Canadians."

D'Aquino was one of the "private sector architects" of the "Canada-United States free trade initiative" and NAFTA.

One of BCNI's early achievements included a major study on parliamentary reform undertaken by BCNI resulting in the 1983 publication of Parliamentary Democracy in Canada: Issues for reform.

Another early success was BCNI's role in engineering the landmark 1985 Western Accord on Energy. BCNI arranged a series of meetings between "oil executives and the Alberta Government, industrialists and the Ontario government, and bankers and the Federal Government." The Western Accord signed on June 1, 1985, replaced the reviled National Energy Program. It "was virtually an echo of the BCNI's proposals." It included "deregulation of crude oil prices, leaving the Canadian price free to respond to world market forces; deregulation of natural gas prices and a severing of the link between gas and oil prices; Lowering of federal taxes and provincial royalties; basing resource taxation on profits rather than revenues; Provision of exploration and development incentives through the tax system instead of through grants."

In an August 1986 interview in Ottawa, d'Aquino was "concerned to differentiate the BCNI from neo-conservative bodies such as the National Citizens' Coalition or the Fraser Institute."

By 1987, BCNI members included the CEOs of 150 Canadian corporations representing $700 billion in assets. By 1987, the BCNI has been successful in forging "common positions on major issues... [despite] the wide diversity of sectoral and regional representation ... consensus has been achieved in virtually every task force initiative since 1981." The BCNI "asks members to consider issues from a national perspective. Advocacy of individual company concerns is discouraged. Second, great emphasis is placed on balancing interests when specific issues are under consideration. This requires compromise and long-term thinking. Another reason lies in the values which members share, values shaped by a belief in the liberal democratic tradition, in the market economy, in limited and accountable government, and in an independent Canada within a strong Western alliance." cited in Langille.

D'Aquino had a good relationship with every Canadian Prime Minister.

In 1999, the BCNI membership "administered more than $2 trillion in assets, ha[d] a yearly turnover of more than $500 billion, employ[ed] about one in ten working Canadians and [were] responsible for a majority of Canadian private sector investment, exports, research and development and training." d'Aquino noted that Canada had cut inflation and interest rates, expanded exports and jobs and reduced government deficits, but he called on the federal to make "significant tax cuts."

In a talk to the BCNI in the fall of 2000, against the backdrop of the "growing anti-globalization movement", d'Aquino, echoing Fred Bernsten, reminded Canadian CEOs "not to take globalization for granted." Globalization was reversible. "From the perspective of enlightened self-interest, d'Aquino noted that business leaders had to spend more time explaining the benefits of globalization, become better global citizens and devote greater resources towards "shoring up and improving key global institutions."

In 2004, the BCNI was renamed the Canadian Council of Chief Executives (CCCE).

In his 2004 book, The Return of the State: Protestors, Power-Brokers and the New Global Compromise, York University professor, Adam Harmes described d'Aquino as "Canada's number-one free-market conservative" and the Canadian Council of Chief Executives (CCCE), formerly the BCNI, as "Canada's most powerful lobby group".

By 2009, as a "result of globalization and free trade, [Canada had] considerably more companies that are truly global."CCCE's 150 CEOs represented "$4.5 trillion in assets with $850 billion in revenues."

When d'Aquino stepped down as CEO, the CCCE named him as a Distinguished Lifetime Member.

In 2009 d'Aquino was described by Globe and Mail's John Lorinc as Canada's "behind-the-scenes prime minister" and the "most influential corporate tout" for almost 30 years.

D'Aquino was listed among the top 100 most influential people in Canada in the 20th century.

=== John Manley (2009-2018) ===
In January 2016, the CCCE was renamed the Business Council of Canada. According to a BCC January 2016 article, members of the "40-year-old organization" are "CEOs and entrepreneurs of 150 leading Canadian companies" that "employ[ed] 1.4 million Canadians, account[ed] for more than half the value of the Toronto Stock Exchange, contribute[d] the largest share of federal corporate taxes, and [were] responsible for most of Canada's exports, corporate philanthropy, and private-sector investments in research and development."

=== Goldy Hyder (2018) ===
In 2018, Goldy Hyder succeeded John Manley as the president and CEO of the Business Council of Canada, who had been in the position since Thomas d'Aquino stepped down in 2009. During his tenure, Hyder has focused on a number of issues, including challenges facing Canadian businesses due to the COVID-19 pandemic, economic growth and bolstering the Canada-U.S. relationship.

== Archives ==
There is a Thomas d'Aquino fonds at Library and Archives Canada. Archival reference number is R15526.
