= Operation Archer =

Canadian Forces operation in Afghanistan (July 2005)

Operation Archer is the Canadian Forces contribution to Operation Enduring Freedom in Afghanistan. It began in July 2005 with the deployment of a 220-member "theater activation team" to Kandahar.

Operation ARCHER is structurally part of the Combined Security Transition Command – Afghanistan (CSTC-A) that seeks to mentor and instruct the Afghan government and its departments. The purpose of Operation Archer is the reconstruction of Afghanistan through the establishment of infrastructure, providing security, and assisting in training the Afghan National Army.

== Opposition ==
Operation Archer is politically controversial, both among activist groups and members of Parliament.
