= Star of Military Valour =

Canadian military decoration

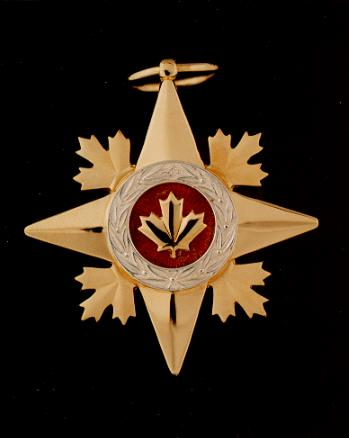
- Obverse of the insignia
- Type: Military decoration
- Awarded for: Distinguished and valiant service in the presence of the enemy.
- Presented by: The governor general of Canada
- Eligibility: Any person enrolled in the Canadian Forces.
- Status: Currently awarded
- Ribbon bars of the Star of Military Valour (SMV with Bar at bottom)

Precedence
- Next (higher): Order of Yukon
- Next (lower): Star of Courage

The Star of Military Valour (French: Étoile de la vaillance militaire) is a military decoration that is, within the Canadian system of honours, the second highest award for military valour, and one of three honours for military valour awarded by the governor general of Canada. Created in 1993, the medal is presented to both living and deceased members of the Canadian Forces deemed to have demonstrated "distinguished and valiant service in the presence of the enemy," and grants recipients the ability to use the post-nominal letters SMV.

== History ==
On 2 February 1993, three decorations, including the Star of Military Valour, were created by Queen Elizabeth II as a family of Canadian military valour decorations. The first awarding of the star was by Governor General Michaëlle Jean, on 27 October 2006; only with Canada's participation in the 2001 invasion of Afghanistan did there emerge, for the first time since 1993, circumstances wherein one could carry out actions deserving of the Star of Military Valour.

== Design ==
The Star of Military Valour is in the form of a silver-gilt four-pointed star with a maple leaf in each angle. On the obverse is a roundel at the centre of the star, bearing a gold maple leaf on a red enamel background and surrounded by a silver laurel wreath. The reverse bears on the upper arm the royal cypher of the reigning monarch beneath St. Edward's Crown—symbolizing the Canadian monarch's roles as both fount of honour and Commander-in-Chief of the Canadian Forces—and the inscription pro valore. Below this is engraved the name and rank of the recipient.

This medallion is worn on the left chest, on a 38-millimetre-wide (1.5 in) crimson ribbon with two vertical white stripes: for men, hung from a bar, and for women, on a ribbon bow, both pinned to the left chest. Should an individual already possessing a Star of Military Valour be awarded the medal again for subsequent valorous acts, he or she is granted a simple gold medal bar, bearing a maple leaf at its centre, for wear on the ribbon from which the original medal is suspended.

== Eligibility and receipt ==
The star is awarded only to members of the Canadian Forces, or members of allied armed forces serving alongside the Canadian Forces, who have shown conspicuous acts of valour in the face of enemy hostility. Should a person meet these criteria, nominations are made through his or her chain of command to the Military Valour Decorations Advisory Committee—a part of the Chancellery of Honours at Government House—which then makes its recommendations to the Governor General of Canada, via the Chief of the Defence Staff. Once they have been decorated with the Star of Military Valour, recipients are granted the right to use the post-nominal letters SMV. The Star of Military Valour can be awarded posthumously, as well as multiple times.

== Recipients ==
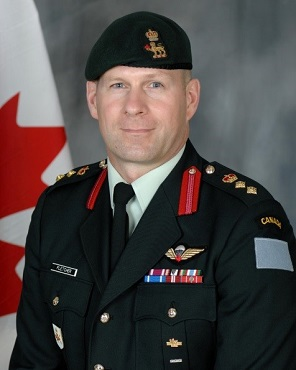
Col. Bill Fletcher wearing his S.M.V. ribbon bar

In chronological order, the recipients have been:

- Sergeant Patrick Tower SMV CD, awarded 25 October 2006
- Major William Hilton Fletcher SMV CD, awarded 18 December 2006
- Private Jess Randall Larochelle SMV, awarded 14 March 2007
- Corporal Sean Teal SMV, awarded 14 March 2007
- Major David Quick SMV, awarded 8 January 2008
- Sergeant William Kenneth MacDonald SMV CD, awarded 4 April 2008
- Master-Corporal J. Donovan Ball SMV, awarded 26 June 2008
- Captain Jonathan Snyder SMV, awarded posthumously 26 June 2008
- Warrant Officer David Shultz SMV, awarded 13 November 2009
- Master Corporal Jeremy Pinchin SMV, awarded 4 June 2010
- 3 unnamed members of the Canadian Special Operations Forces Command, awarded 11 March 2011
- Captain Gabriel Chasse-Jean SMV CD, awarded 11 June 2011
- Master Warrant Officer Richard Stacey SMV CD, awarded 11 June 2011
- Corporal Jean-François Belzil SMV, awarded 18 September 2012
- Private Taumy St-Hilaire SMV, awarded 15 November 2012
- Senior Chief Special Warfare Operator Thomas Arthur Ratzlaff USN, awarded 15 November 2010

In 2014, La Promenade building in the parliamentary precinct in Ottawa was renamed the Valour Building to honour the recipients of the Star of Military Valour.

== See also ==
- Canadian order of precedence (decorations and medals)
- State decoration
