= 2023 in the United Kingdom =

Events of the year 2023 in the United Kingdom. This is the year of the coronation of King Charles III.

== Incumbents ==
- Monarch – Charles III
- Prime Minister – Rishi Sunak (Conservative)

== Events ==
=== January ===
- 1 January – A visit by Thor the Walrus to Scarborough harbour, North Yorkshire overnight on New Year's Eve results in the town's New Year fireworks celebrations being cancelled to let the walrus rest for his journey to the Arctic. He was previously spotted at Pagham Harbour, Calshot, Hampshire in December 2022.
- 2 January
  - Three people are killed by a fire at the New County Hotel in Perth, Scotland.
  - Thor the Walrus makes an appearance in Blyth, Northumberland.
- 3 January – 40,000 railway workers who are members of the RMT union hold the first of two 48-hour strikes this week, severely disrupting train services in England, Scotland, and Wales.
- 5 January
  - The government confirms it will not go ahead with a plan to privatise Channel 4.
  - The Met Office confirms that 2022 was the UK's warmest year since records began in 1884, with an average annual temperature above 10 °C (50 °F) for the first time.
  - BioNTech announces a strategic partnership with the UK government to provide up to 10,000 patients with personalised mRNA cancer immunotherapies by 2030.
- 6 January – COVID-19 in the UK: Almost three million people were infected with COVID-19 over the Christmas period (the highest since July 2022), the latest Office for National Statistics data suggests, with one in 20 having the virus in England, one in 18 in Wales, one in 25 in Scotland and one in 16 in Northern Ireland. XBB.1.5, the new Omicron variant of the virus, is believed to be responsible for one in 200 infections in the UK.
- 8 January – ITV1 broadcasts a 95-minute interview with Prince Harry ahead of the release of his memoirs, Spare.
- 10 January
  - The UK government publishes the Strikes (Minimum Service Levels) Bill 2023, designed to require public sector organisations to provide a minimum service when their unions vote to strike.
  - Prince Harry's controversial memoir Spare is released, becoming "the fastest selling non-fiction book of all time" on the date of its release.
- 11 January – Andrew Bridgen has the whip suspended by the Conservative Party after he spread misinformation about COVID-19 and compared vaccination to the Holocaust.
- 12 January – Heavy rain and strong winds cause floods and travel disruption in parts of the UK, with over 60 flood warnings issued in England, 19 in Wales and 2 in Scotland.
- 13 January
  - Figures indicate the UK economy unexpectedly grew by 0.1% in November 2022, potentially avoiding a long recession.
  - Medical experts criticise the BBC for an interview with Aseem Malhotra who claims that mRNA vaccines may have been responsible for thousands of excess deaths.
  - Manchester City footballer Benjamin Mendy is cleared on six counts of rape and one count of sexual assault against four young women, but faces a retrial on two counts the jury could not reach verdicts on.
  - COVID-19 in the UK: The latest Office for National Statistics data indicates COVID-19 cases were falling in England and Wales in the week up to 30 December 2022, with cases continuing to increase in Scotland; the picture was unclear for Northern Ireland. In England, an estimated 2,189,300 people were thought to have tested positive for COVID-19.
- 14 January
  - Four women and two children are injured in a drive-by mass shooting close to a Catholic church in Euston Road, Euston, Central London. A 22-year-old man is arrested two days later on suspicion of attempted murder.
  - Amid recent heavy rain, more than 100 flood warnings by the Environment Agency remain in place across the country, with hundreds of homes damaged and many left without power.
  - Rishi Sunak confirms that the UK will send 14 Challenger 2 tanks to Ukraine to boost its war effort.
- 16 January
  - Serving Metropolitan Police officer David Carrick admits over 40 offences including more than 20 rapes against 12 women over two decades.
  - The National Education Union announces that teachers in England and Wales will strike on seven dates during February and March after members voted in favour of strike action. National strikes will be held on 1 and 15 February, and 15 March, as well as four days of regional strikes.
  - The UK government announces it will block the Gender Recognition Reform (Scotland) Bill, the first time that the UK government has used powers to block a Scottish law. UK ministers say the draft law would "conflict with equality protections applying across Great Britain".
  - The Royal College of Nursing announces a further two nurses' strikes for 6 and 7 February, described as the biggest so far.
  - MPs vote 309–249 in favour of the Strikes (Minimum Service Levels) Bill 2023, which now moves to the committee stage.
- 18 January
  - The ONS reports that inflation dropped for the second month running, to 10.5% in December, from 10.7% the previous month. At the two extremes of the ONS's list of "notable movements" that contribute to the overall figure, 'clothing and footwear' price inflation dropped from 7.5% to 6.4%, 'furniture and household goods' dropped from 10.8% to 9.8%, 'food and non-alcoholic beverages' rose from 16.5% to 16.9%, and 'restaurants and hotels' rose from 10.2% to 11.4%.
  - BBC News reports that Church of England bishops will not give their backing to a change in teaching that would allow them to marry same-sex couples, but the Church will offer "prayers of dedication, thanksgiving or God's blessing" to gay couples.
- 19 January – Prime Minister Rishi Sunak apologises for taking his seat belt off in a moving car to film a social media clip. Lancashire Police later say they are "looking into" the incident. He is issued with a fixed-penalty notice the following day.
- 20 January
  - The Church of England issues an apology for the "shameful" times it has "rejected or excluded" LGBTQ+ people, while Archbishop of Canterbury Justin Welby says he supports the changes that allow blessings to be offered to gay couples, but says he will not personally use them because he has a "responsibility to the whole communion".
  - The High Court awards £39m in damages against Frimley Health NHS Foundation Trust in Surrey to a girl whose limbs were amputated after she was wrongly diagnosed.
  - COVID-19 in the UK: ONS data for the week up to 10 January indicates that COVID-19 infections have continued to fall in England and Wales, with one in 40 people (an estimated 2.6% of the population) testing positive for the virus.
- 22 January – Labour's chairwoman, Anneliese Dodds writes to Daniel Greenberg, the Parliamentary Commissioner for Standards, requesting "an urgent investigation" into claims that Richard Sharp, the chairman of the BBC, helped former prime minister Boris Johnson secure a loan guarantee weeks before Johnson recommended him for the BBC chairmanship.
- 23 January
  - Prime Minister Rishi Sunak asks his Independent Adviser on Ministers' Interests to investigate allegations that, during his time as Chancellor of the Exchequer, Chairman of the Conservative Party Nadhim Zahawi paid a penalty to HM Revenue and Customs in relation to previously unpaid tax.
  - William Shawcross, the Commissioner for Public Appointments, begins a review into the process of hiring Chairman of the BBC Richard Sharp following allegations he helped then-PM Boris Johnson secure a loan guarantee shortly before his appointment. Johnson dismisses the claims, saying Sharp had no knowledge of his finances. Sharp says that although he contacted Cabinet Secretary Simon Case in December 2020 about the offer of a loan to Johnson, he was not involved in discussions.
  - National Grid's Demand Flexibility Service begins in an attempt to avoid a power blackout. Between 5:00pm and 6:00pm, people in England, Scotland and Wales who have signed up to the scheme are asked to use less electricity, and will be paid by their energy companies for doing so.
  - Salisbury Crown Court in Wiltshire convicts Lawangeen Abdulrahimzai of a murder he committed in Bournemouth, Dorset, in 2022.
- 25 January
  - The first ever strike by UK employees of Amazon is held. 300 staff at a Coventry warehouse stage a one-day walk out, in a dispute over pay and conditions.
  - Lawangeen Abdulrahimzai is sentenced to life imprisonment.
- 26 January – Nicola Sturgeon confirms that Isla Bryson, a trans woman recently convicted of raping two women before her transition, has been moved from Cornton Vale women's prison to HMP Edinburgh men's prison, sparking debate about the Gender Recognition Reform (Scotland) Bill.
- 27 January
  - Nicola Bulley disappears mysteriously whilst walking her dog beside the River Wyre.
  - COVID-19 in the UK: Data released by the Office for National Statistics for the week ending 17 January indicate overall cases have continued to fall. In England, the estimated number of people testing positive for COVID-19 was 906,300 (roughly 1.62% of the population or 1 in 60 people).
- 28 January
  - Airline Flybe (2022–2023) cancels all flights to and from the UK after going into administration.
  - Charity Super.Mkt, billed as the UK's first multi-charity store and selling items supplied by ten charities, opens at London's Brent Cross Shopping Centre.
- 29 January
  - Conservative Party Chairman Nadhim Zahawi is sacked by Rishi Sunak over "a serious breach of the Ministerial Code" relating to the investigation into his tax affairs, conducted on 23 January.
  - The Scottish Prison Service pauses the movement of all transgender prisoners while it carries out an "urgent review" into the transgender cases held in its custody.
- 30 January
  - William Shawcross, the commissioner for public appointments, steps back from the planned investigation into how Richard Sharp got the job as BBC chairman because of previous contact between them. Another investigator will be appointed to take on the inquiry.
  - Members of the Fire Brigades Union vote to take strike action over pay.

=== February ===
- 1 February – An estimated 475,000 workers go on strike, the single biggest day of industrial action for more than a decade, in disputes over pay and conditions. This includes 200,000 teachers, 100,000 civil servants including border force workers, university lecturers, security guards, and train drivers. The government warns the public to expect "significant disruption".
- 2 February
  - The Bank of England raises its key interest rate from 3.5 to 4%, the highest level in 14 years.
  - The energy regulator Ofgem asks energy companies to suspend the forced installation of prepayment meters following an investigation by The Times which showed agents working for British Gas breaking into the homes of vulnerable customers to install the meters.
- 3 February
  - Gary Glitter is freed from prison after serving half of a 16-year jail term for attempted rape, four counts of indecent assault and one of having sex with a girl under 13.
  - COVID-19 in the UK: Office for National Statistics data for the week up to 24 January indicates that COVID-19 cases continue to fall, with an estimated 1 in 70 people (1.42% of the population) testing positive for the virus in England over that time.
- 5 February
  - Emma Pattinson, the head of Epsom College in Surrey, is found dead along with her husband and seven-year-old daughter in a property at the school. Police suspect a murder-suicide by gunshot.
  - In a move seen as marking her return to political life, former prime minister Liz Truss writes an article for The Sunday Telegraph in which she says her economic agenda was never given a "realistic chance".
- 6 February
  - 2022–2023 National Health Service strikes: Ambulance staff and nurses walk out, with further disruption to follow in the week, in what is expected to be the biggest-ever round of NHS strikes.
  - Foreign Secretary James Cleverly offers his condolences to victims of the 7.8 magnitude Turkey–Syria earthquake and says the UK is deploying emergency response teams, including 76 search and rescue specialists, equipment and rescue dogs. The government issues an urgent warning to British travellers and holidaymakers who may be in or planning to visit the region.
- 7 February
  - Former Met Police officer David Carrick, one of the UK's most prolific sex offenders, is sentenced at Southwark Crown Court to 36 life sentences with a minimum term of 30 years in prison.
  - Sunak performs a cabinet reshuffle. Greg Hands is named as the new Conservative Party chairman; Grant Shapps becomes the secretary of state for energy, security and net zero in a newly-formed department; Kemi Badenoch is appointed as the first secretary of state at the newly created Department for Business and Trade, with continued responsibility as equalities minister.
- 8 February
  - Ukraine's President Volodymyr Zelenskyy addresses a joint session of Parliament during his first visit to the UK since Russia invaded his country. He later visits Buckingham Palace for a meeting with the King.
  - Former Labour MP Jared O'Mara, who submitted fake expense claims to fund his cocaine habit, is convicted of fraud. The following day, he is sentenced to four years in prison.
  - Royal Mail unveils a new stamp design that will be available from 4 April, featuring an image of the unadorned head of King Charles III.
- 9 February
  - The UK commits additional funding to help the victims of the earthquake in Turkey and Syria.
  - 2023 West Lancashire by-election: Labour hold the seat with a large vote share of 62.3%, an increase of 10.3%. Ashley Dalton is the new MP.
  - In a radio interview before his appointment as Deputy Chairman of the Conservative Party, Lee Anderson says he will support the return of capital punishment where the perpetrators are clearly identifiable. Prime Minister Rishi Sunak says neither he nor the government shares Anderson's stance.
- 10 February
  - Chancellor Jeremy Hunt tells the BBC households are unlikely to receive extra help with their energy bills from April 2023, as he does not think the government has the "headroom to make a major new initiative to help people".
  - Data released by the Office for National Statistics indicates the UK narrowly avoided a recession at the end of 2022 following zero per cent growth during October to December. This is also despite a fall in output of 0.5% during December due to strike action being staged prior to Christmas.
  - Coronation of Charles III and Camilla
    - Buckingham Palace unveils the official Coronation logo, designed by Sir Jony Ive.
    - A ballot offering 10,000 free tickets to the Coronation concert at Windsor Castle on 7 May opens.
  - COVID-19 in the UK: Data from the Office for National Statistics for the week ending 31 January indicates COVID-19 cases have risen in England for the first time in 2023, with 1.02 million cases, an increase of 8% from 941,800 the previous week. Data for Scotland and Wales is less clear.
- 11 February – Brianna Ghey, a 16-year-old teenage transgender girl is found dead in Warrington Park in Cheshire, England. Two teenagers, a boy and a girl, both 15-years-old are arrested on suspicion of her murder.
- 13 February – Former Metropolitan Police officer Wayne Couzens pleads guilty to three counts of indecent exposure during a hearing at the Old Bailey, including one committed four days before he killed Sarah Everard in 2021.
- 14 February – The Welsh government cancels all major road building projects in Wales, including the proposed Third Menai Crossing, amid concerns about the environment.
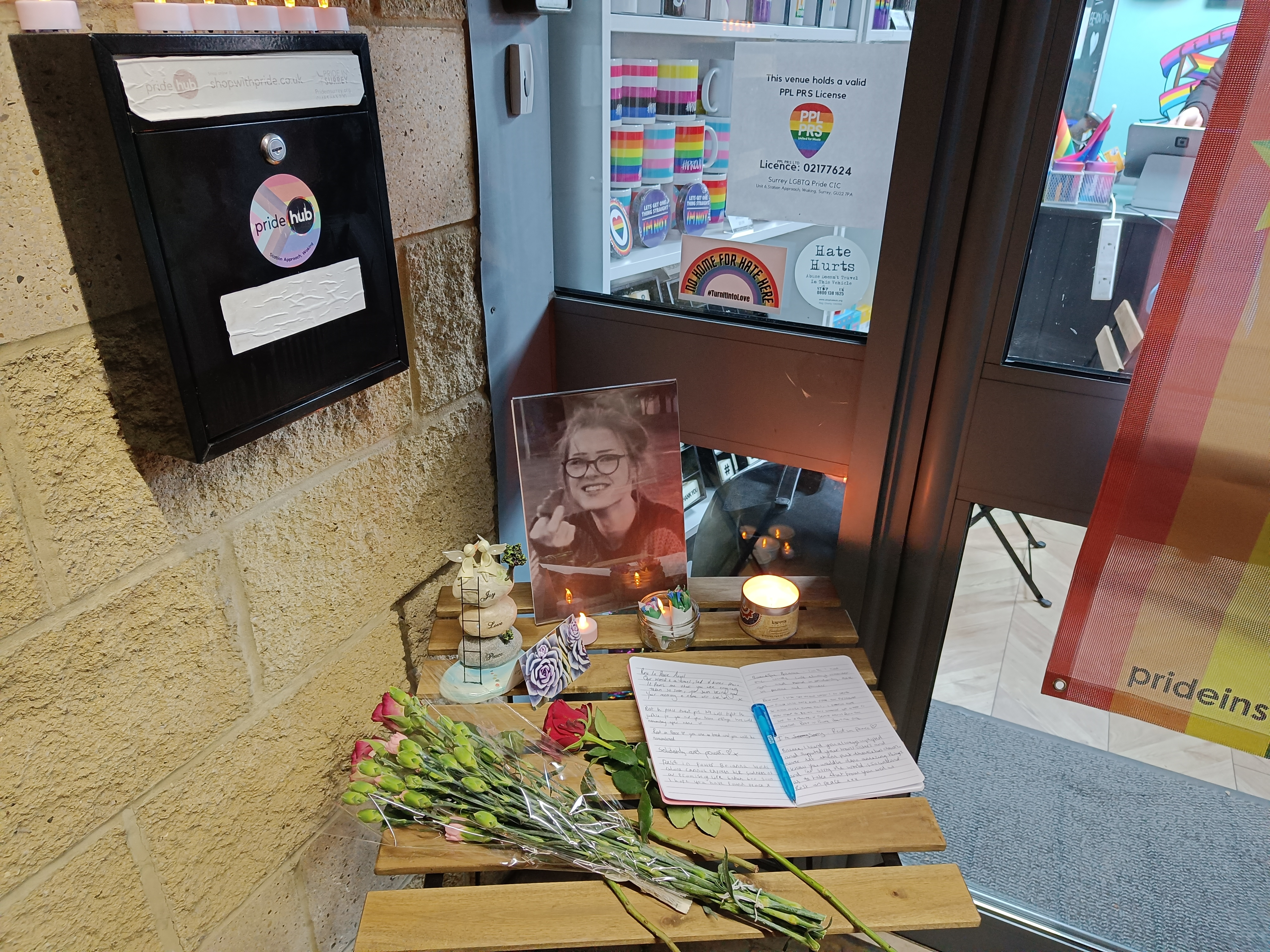
- Book of condolence at a vigil for Brianna Ghey in Woking
  15 February
  - Inflation falls for the third month in a row, from 10.5% to 10.1%. This is mainly due to a decrease in fuel, restaurant, and hotel prices, according to the ONS. Food inflation remains at 16.7%. Pay, excluding bonuses, rose at an annual pace of 6.7% from October to December 2022, and when inflation is taken into account, regular pay fell by 2.5%.
  - Nicola Sturgeon announces her resignation as First Minister of Scotland and Leader of the Scottish National Party after eight years in the role; she will stay on until her successor has been elected.
  - Two teenagers are charged with murder in relation to the death of Brianna Ghey.
- 16 February – The RMT announce four new days of train strikes for 16, 18 and 30 March, and 1 April.
- 17 February
  - David Ballantyne Smith, a former security guard at the British embassy in Berlin who attempted to sell confidential information to the Russians, is sentenced to 13 years imprisonment following a trial at the Old Bailey.
  - Storm Otto strikes Scotland and parts of northern England, leaving around 30,000 homes without power and forcing a number of schools to close.
  - COVID-19 in the UK: Office for National Statistics data for the week up to 7 February indicates that COVID-19 cases continued to increase in England, Wales and Scotland, but decreased in Northern Ireland. In England, In England it is estimated that 1,054,200 people had COVID-19, equating to 1.88% of the population, or around 1 in 55 people.
- 18 February – Coronation of Charles III and Camilla: Twelve new pieces of music are commissioned by the King for his coronation, including a composition by Andrew Lloyd Webber. Part of the service will also be in Welsh, it is confirmed.
- 19 February – Police searching for Nicola Bulley, missing since 27 January, announce they have found a body in the River Wyre.
- 20 February
  - Lancashire Police confirm the body found in the River Wyre the previous day is that of Nicola Bulley.
  - Prime Minister Rishi Sunak criticises the rewriting of Roald Dahl's books after they were updated to remove references that could be considered offensive, such as characters being fat.
  - Junior doctors in England vote to strike in their ongoing dispute for a 26% pay rise, and will stage a 72-hour walkout. The BMA maintains junior doctors' pay has been cut by 26% since 2008 after inflation is considered.
- 21 February
  - The UK Government announces that it had a budget surplus in January, with £5bn more in revenue than predicted.
  - A planned 48-hour strike by nurses in England is called off to allow the Royal College of Nursing and Department of Health and Social Care to enter into renewed negotiations.
  - The broadcasting regulator Ofcom writes to both ITV News and Sky News to ask them for an explanation of their actions following complaints made by the family of Nicola Bulley. Her family had been contacted by both outlets despite asking for privacy.
  - Asda and Morrisons announce they are limiting the sale of some fruit and vegetable products, such as tomatoes, peppers and cucumbers, because of a shortage caused by severe weather in Spain and North Africa which has affected harvests.
  - The UK Government recommends a 3.5% pay rise for public sector workers in England, below the rate of inflation.
- 22 February
  - Shamima Begum loses her legal challenge to overturn the decision to remove her UK citizenship.
  - Tesco and Aldi Süd follow Asda and Morrisons by introducing limits on the purchase of some fruit and vegetables.
  - Lancashire Police and Crime Commissioner Andrew Snowden commissions the College of Policing to review the force's investigation into the disappearance of Nicola Bulley, including the release of information about her private life.
  - DCI John Caldwell, an off duty Police Service of Northern Ireland officer, is injured in Omagh after being shot by suspected New IRA gunman.
- 23 February
  - Labour leader Sir Keir Starmer outlines the five key issues that his party will focus on during the run up to the 2024 general election: higher economic growth, clean energy, improving the NHS, reforming the justice system, and raising education standards.
  - Environment Secretary Thérèse Coffey, commenting on the vegetable shortage, tells MPs "we anticipate the situation will last about another two to four weeks".
  - Three men are arrested in relation to the previous evening's shooting of DCI John Caldwell.
- 24 February
  - The British Medical Association announces that junior doctors in England will begin a three-day strike on 13 March.
  - An earthquake measuring 3.7 magnitude strikes Brynmawr, Blaenau Gwent at 11.59pm.
  - COVID-19 in the UK: Office for National Statistics data for the week up to 14 February indicates COVID-19 cases continued to rise in England, Scotland and Wales, but remained uncertain in Northern Ireland. In England, the estimated number of people testing positive for COVID-19 was 1,223,000 (or 2.18% of the population and around 1 in 45 people).
- 27 February
  - New Transgender Policy Guidance for England and Wales came into force on 27 February 2023 under which transgender women offenders would no longer be housed in women's prisons if they had male genitalia or had committed sex crimes.
  - Ofgem announces a 23% decrease in the quarterly price cap on the amount suppliers can charge for household energy bills, from £4,279 to £3,280 – a £999 drop, to apply from April 2023.
  - Sunak and President of the European Commission Ursula von der Leyen announce a new agreement concerning movement of goods to/from Northern Ireland, named the Windsor Framework.
  - Lidl becomes the latest UK food retailer to limit the sale of some fruit and vegetables due to an ongoing shortage.
  - New regulations come into force in England and Wales banning transgender women who still have male genitalia, or those who are sex offenders, from being sent to women's prisons.
- 28 February
  - Royal Mail issue the final special set of stamps featuring the late Queen Elizabeth II, to mark the centenary of The Flying Scotsman.
  - Sunak meets businesses and their employees in Belfast, to secure support for his new agreement with the EU. He tells them that being in both the single market and the UK makes Northern Ireland the "world's most exciting economic zone" and "an incredibly attractive place to invest."
  - Transgender rapist Isla Bryson is sentenced to eight years in prison with a further three years supervision.
  - Sainsbury's announces the closure of two Argos depots over the next three years, with the loss of 1,400 jobs.
  - Zholia Alemi, who faked a medical degree certificate from the University of Auckland to work as a psychiatrist for two decades, is sentenced to seven years in prison following a trial at Manchester Crown Court.
  - Members of the National Union of Journalists working for the BBC regional service in England vote to take strike action over planned cuts to BBC Local Radio. A 24-hour strike is scheduled for 15 March to coincide with Budget Day.

=== March ===
- 1 March
  - COVID-19 in the UK
    - Lockdown Files: WhatsApp messages leaked to the Daily Telegraph are reported as suggesting former Health Secretary Matt Hancock chose to ignore advice from experts in April 2020 that there should be "testing of all going into care homes". A spokesman for Hancock says "These stolen messages have been doctored to create a false story that Matt rejected clinical advice on care home testing".
  - A Freedom of Information request by BBC News reveals that 729 sex offenders who were under supervision disappeared off the radar in a three-year period from 2019 to the end of 2021.
- 2 March
  - COVID-19 in the UK: Lockdown Files: The Daily Telegraph publishes more of Matt Hancock's WhatsApp exchanges, this time with former education secretary Gavin Williamson in December 2020, when a debate into whether schools should reopen following the Christmas holiday was taking place. The leaked messages suggest Hancock favoured school closures, while Williamson was more hesitant. Hancock, who worked alongside journalist Isabel Oakeshott to co-author a book, describes the release of the messages as a "massive betrayal and breach of trust". In response, Oakeshott says she released the messages because she believed doing so was in the "public interest".
  - Sir Keir Starmer unveils Sue Gray, who led the investigation into the Partygate scandal, as Labour's new chief of staff, sparking concern among some Conservative MPs about her impartiality.
  - The public inquiry into the 2017 Manchester Arena bombing finds that MI5 missed a significant chance to take action that might have stopped the attack when they failed to obtain intelligence that would have led them to follow Salman Abedi to the car where he was storing explosives. Ken McCallum, the director-general of MI5, says he regrets that the intelligence was missed.
- 3 March
  - COVID-19 in the UK:
    - Lockdown Files: The latest leaked WhatsApp messages published by the Daily Telegraph are reported as appearing to show former Health Secretary Matt Hancock and Cabinet Secretary Simon Case joking about locking people in quarantine hotels.
    - Office for National Statistics data for the week up to 21 February indicates that COVID-19 infections were increasing in England and Wales, but decreasing in Northern Ireland, while the situation in Scotland was uncertain. In England, the number of people testing positive for COVID-19 was estimated to be 1,298,600 (roughly 2.31% of the population around 1 in 45).
  - The Commons Select Committee of Privileges finds that former prime minister Boris Johnson may have misled Parliament over the Partygate scandal after evidence suggested breaches of COVID-19 rules would have been "obvious" to him. In response Johnson says that none of the evidence shows he "knowingly" misled parliament, and that "it is clear from this report that I have not committed any contempt of parliament".
  - Buckingham Palace announces the first state visit to be made by Charles III and Camilla as King and Queen Consort; they will travel to France and Germany from 26 to 31 March.
- 4 March
  - COVID-19 in the UK:
    - Lockdown Files: The latest leaked WhatsApp messages published by the Daily Telegraph indicate, according to BBC News who have not seen or verified the messages, that Matt Hancock and his staff deliberated over whether or not he had broken COVID-19 regulations after pictures of him kissing his aide, Gina Coladangelo, were published by The Sun newspaper. Other messages also show Hancock criticising the Eat Out to Help Out scheme for "causing problems" in areas where there were a high number of COVID-19 cases.
  - Typhoon jets are scrambled from RAF Coningsby in Lincolnshire to help escort a civilian plane en route from Iceland to Kenya following a loss of communication caused by an equipment malfunction. A sonic boom is heard over parts of England after the jets are allowed to fly at supersonic speed.
- 5 March
  - Train fares in England and Wales are increased by up to 5.9%, representing the largest increase in more than a decade.
  - COVID-19 in the UK:
    - Lockdown Files: News outlets including BBC News, Sky News and The Independent — who have not verified the messages — report that further WhatsApp messages published by The Telegraph appear to show discussions about how and when the government should reveal details of the Kent variant in order to ensure people would comply with COVID-19 regulations. The news outlets also say Hancock appears to suggest they should "frighten the pants off everyone", while in another conversation, head of the civil service Simon Case suggests the "fear/guilt factor" is an important element of the government's messaging. The Telegraph also reports messages showing ministers and civil servants discussing "[getting] heavy with the police" to enforce lockdown measures with senior police officers being brought into Number 10 to be told to be stricter with the public.
  - Speaking to the Mail on Sunday, Sunak says that migrants arriving in the UK on small boats will be prevented from seeking asylum under proposed new legislation to be brought before Parliament.
  - In the Premier League, Liverpool beat Manchester United 7–0, the biggest margin in their historic rivalry and surpassing the previous margin of Liverpool FC 7–1 Newton Heath on 12 October 1895.
- 6 March
  - Media regulator Ofcom finds that a GB News programme which aired on 21 April 2022 was in breach of broadcasting rules, as it presented misinformation on COVID-19 and vaccines.
  - Members of the Fire Brigades Union vote to accept a 7% pay rise backdated to July 2022, and worth 5% from July 2023, meaning they will not strike.
  - Wayne Couzens is sentenced to 19 months imprisonment after pleading guilty to three counts of indecent exposure in the months prior to the kidnap and murder of Sarah Everard.
  - A parole hearing for Charles Bronson, one of the UK's longest serving prisoners, is held at the Royal Courts of Justice. It is the second such hearing to be held in public.
  - COVID-19 in the UK:
    - Lockdown Files: The Telegraph publishes messages that are reported to have been exchanged between Allan Nixon, a parliamentary Advisor and Matt Hancock from November 2020 in which they discuss threatening to cancel projects in MPs' constituencies if MPs do not support the local lockdown tiers legislation. It is also reported that as part of a strategy aimed at trying to stop MPs from rebelling against the legislation, party whips compiled a spreadsheet of 95 MPs who disagreed with this policy and the reasons for them disagreeing; these related to lack of parliamentary scrutiny, economic harm, harms to hospital, absence of cost benefit analysis and the policy being "unconservative".
- 7 March
  - A cold snap from the Arctic hits the UK, causing snowfall in Scotland and parts of northern England. Two coal fire power stations are also reactivated amid concerns about the strain the cold snap could cause on the National Grid.
  - Home Secretary Suella Braverman introduces the Illegal Migration Bill into the House of Commons, which is designed to stop migrants arriving in the UK by boat. The legislation proposes to detain and remove those from the UK who arrive by illegal means, as well as blocking them from returning.
  - COVID-19 in the UK: The Joint Committee on Vaccination and Immunisation announces that everyone over 75, care-home residents and anyone considered to be extremely vulnerable aged five and over will be offered a spring COVID-19 booster vaccine. Vaccinations will begin in March in Scotland, early April in England and Wales, and mid-April in Northern Ireland.
  - RMT staff working for Network Rail call off a strike planned for 16 March after being given a fresh pay offer.
- 8 March
  - The UK experiences its coldest March night since 2010, with −15.2 °C recorded in Kinbrace, Scotland, dipping even further to −15.4 °C by the morning. The Health Security Agency issues a level 3 cold alert for the whole of England, while more than 100 schools across Wales are closed due to snow.
  - The National Institute for Health and Care Excellence (NICE) approves the use of the weight loss drug semaglutide (marketed as Wegovy) by the NHS in England.
- 9 March
  - The UK government announces a two-year delay in the construction of the Birmingham to Crewe leg of HS2 in order to save costs.
  - Asda and Morrisons lift their restrictions on the sale of fresh produce.
  - Following a trial at the High Court in Aberdeen, retired research scientist Christopher Harrison, 82, is convicted of the murder of his ex-wife, Brenda Page, in 1978.
- 10 March
  - The UK economy grew by 0.3% in January 2023, official figures show, much more than the 0.1% that was predicted by economists.
  - The King bestows the title of Duke of Edinburgh on his younger brother, Prince Edward.
  - Prime Minister Rishi Sunak attends a summit in Paris with French president Emmanuel Macron and announces the UK will give France £500m over three years to help the UK stop the influx of migrants arriving by boat.
  - The BBC tells Gary Lineker he cannot present BBC One's Match of the Day until an agreement can be reached over his social media use.
  - COVID-19 in the UK: Office for National Statistics data for the week ending 28 February indicates COVID-19 cases are rising in Scotland, but the picture is unclear in the rest of the UK. In England, the number of people testing positive for COVID-19 was estimated to be 1,333,400, equating to 2.38% of the population, or around 1 in 40 people. In Scotland, the figure was 128,400, equating to 2.44% of the population or around 1 in 40 people.
- 11 March
  - The BBC apologises for 'limited' sports broadcasts, as a growing number of TV and radio presenters drop out of key programmes in support of Gary Lineker, amid an ongoing debate over impartiality.
  - The Bank of England announces that the UK arm of Silicon Valley Bank is to enter insolvency, following the demise of its US parent, the largest banking collapse since the 2008 financial crisis. Many UK tech startups are prevented from accessing cash to pay staff.
- 12 March – The UK government announces that charges for prepayment energy meters are to be brought into line with those for customers paying by direct debit from 1 July, saving an average of £45 per year.
- 13 March
  - HSBC agrees to buy the UK arm of Silicon Valley Bank, allowing UK tech firms and customers to access money and services as normal.
  - Gary Lineker is allowed to return to presenting football, as the BBC announces an independent review of its social media guidelines. Director General Tim Davie acknowledges there are "grey areas" and says enforcing impartiality is a "difficult balancing act."
  - Disgraced former pop star Gary Glitter is recalled to prison after breaching his licence conditions.
  - Prime Minister Rishi Sunak announces an extra £5bn of government spending for UK defence over the coming two years.
- 14 March
  - Royal Mail unveils its first design of a new set of ten special stamps, featuring garden flowers and a silhouette of King Charles III.
  - Following a trial at Preston Crown Court, Eleanor Williams is sentenced to eight-and-a-half years in prison after falsely accusing several men of rape and claiming to have been trafficked by an Asian grooming gang.
- 15 March
  - Chancellor of the Exchequer Jeremy Hunt presents the 2023 United Kingdom budget to the House of Commons, and says that the UK will avoid going into recession in 2023.
    - The UK government commits to invest £20bn over the next 20 years in low-carbon energy projects, focusing on carbon capture and storage.
  - Teachers, junior doctors, civil servants and Tube drivers stage a mass walkout, amid ongoing concerns regarding pay, jobs, pensions and working conditions.
- 16 March
  - NHS staff in England, including nurses and ambulance staff, are offered a 5% pay rise from April along with a one-off payment of £1,655 to cover backdated pay. The offer does not include doctors, who are on a different contract.
  - The government announces that TikTok is to be banned on electronic devices used by ministers and other employees, amid security concerns relating to the Chinese-owned app's handling of user data.
  - Scientists identify a gene variant that is known to increases the risk of breast and ovarian cancer, and trace it to people with Orkney Island heritage, more specifically those with ancestry on the island of Westray.
  - COVID-19 in the UK: Office for National Statistics data for the week ending 7 March (6 March in Scotland) indicates COVID-19 cases are falling in Scotland, but the picture is uncertain in the rest of the UK. In England, the survey suggests that 1,322,000 tested positive for the virus, equating to 2.36% of the population, or around 1 in 40.
- 18 March – Peter Murrell resigns as CEO of the Scottish National Party amid a row over party membership.
- 19 March
  - The UK government launches the Emergency Alerts service, a service to send text alerts to mobile phones in a situation where it is perceived there is an immediate risk to life.
  - The BBC urges its staff to delete the TikTok app from its official devices amid concerns about its security.
- 20 March – The British government bans far-right Danish activist Rasmus Paludan from entering the United Kingdom over a threat to burn a Quran in Wakefield, West Yorkshire.
- 21 March
  - Partygate scandal: Former prime minister Boris Johnson publishes a 52-page defence of his actions during the COVID-19 pandemic in which he acknowledges misleading Parliament over the Partygate scandal, but says he did not do so intentionally.
  - Baroness Louise Casey's report into the standards and culture of the Metropolitan Police is published, and describes critical failings, such as discrimination, the organisation's inability to police itself, failings towards women and children, and the loss of public confidence in the service.
- 22 March
  - Data released for February shows that inflation increased from 10.1% to 10.4%, largely due to an increase in the cost of fresh food (particularly vegetables), non-alcoholic drinks, restaurant meals, and women's clothes.
  - A major incident is declared, with 35 injuries reported, after the 76m-long RV Petrel research vessel tips over at a dock in Leith.
  - Boris Johnson gives evidence to the cross-party Privileges Committee, relating to his conduct during Partygate. He insists that he "did not lie" to the House of Commons and always made statements in good faith.
  - MPs back Rishi Sunak's new Brexit deal for Northern Ireland by 515 votes to 29.
  - Scotland's First Minister, Nicola Sturgeon, issues a "sincere, heartfelt and unreserved" apology to people affected by the practice of forced adoption in Scotland during the 1950s, 1960s and 1970s.
  - The RMT call off two strikes planned by staff at 14 train operators that were scheduled for 30 March and 1 April following discussions with the Rail Delivery Group.
  - Prime Minister Rishi Sunak publishes details of his tax returns following calls for him to be more transparent about his finances.
- 23 March
  - The Bank of England raises its key interest rate for the 11th consecutive time, from 4% to 4.25%, in response to the unexpected growth of inflation.
  - Labour Party leader Sir Keir Starmer publishes details of his tax returns, a day after the prime minister.
  - The Westminster Parliament announces that the TikTok app will be banned on "all parliamentary devices and the wider parliamentary network".
  - The British Medical Association announces that junior doctors in England will stage a four-day strike from 11 to 15 April in their continued quest for a 35% pay rise.
  - England footballer Harry Kane becomes the England national football team all-time leading goalscorer with 54 goals in a 2–1 win vs Italy national football team, surpassing the previous record of 53 goals held by Wayne Rooney, who broke the record back in September 2015.
- 24 March
  - Charles III's state visit to France, his first official overseas visit as King, is postponed following a request by French president Emmanuel Macron after unions threatened to stage a day of protests over pension reforms during his visit.
  - MPs vote to back the Protection from Sex-based Harassment in Public Bill, which will make catcalling, following someone or blocking their path an offence in England and Wales with a punishment of up to two years in prison.
  - COVID-19 in the UK: The final Coronavirus Infections Survey is published by the Office for National Statistics, with data for the week up to 13 March. It shows an increase in COVID-19 cases for England, but an uncertain picture for the rest of the UK. The percentage of cases for the Home Nations are shown as follows: 2.66% in England (1 in 40 people), 2.41% in Wales (1 in 40 people), 1.42% in Northern Ireland (1 in 70 people), and 2.59% in Scotland (1 in 40 people).
- 25 March
  - A special Honours list is announced to recognise those who played a role in the state funeral of Elizabeth II, including the eight pallbearers who carried the Queen's coffin during the ceremony.
  - Reports in The Sun and i newspapers suggest former prime minister Liz Truss, who was in office for 49 days, has submitted a Resignation Honours list.
  - BBC Two airs The MI5 Spy and the IRA: Operation Chiffon, a programme in which journalist Peter Taylor reveals the story of an MI5 spy who helped bring about the Northern Ireland Peace Process after defying government orders not to hold talks with Provisional IRA representatives in 1993.
- 26 March
  - A ban on the possession of nitrous oxide ("laughing gas"), which is typically purchased in small glass phials, is announced. The government justifies its action as part of a crackdown on anti-social behaviour, going against recommendations from the Advisory Council on the Misuse of Drugs which had recently advised against criminalisation of the gas.
  - The 2023 Boat Race takes place, with Cambridge beating Oxford in both the men's and women's races.
- 27 March
  - Humza Yousaf succeeds Nicola Sturgeon as Leader of the SNP, after defeating rivals Kate Forbes and Ash Regan in a leadership election.
  - Around 130,000 civil servants belonging to the PCS union vote to strike on 28 April in a dispute with the UK government over pay and conditions.
  - HM Treasury scraps plans for the Royal Mint to produce a government-backed NFT that could be traded on international markets.
- 28 March
  - Humza Yousaf is confirmed as Scotland's new First Minister by a vote in the Scottish Parliament.
  - Former Labour leader Jeremy Corbyn is banned from standing as a candidate for the party at the 2024 general election after the party's National Executive Committee votes 22–12 in favour of a motion blocking his candidacy.
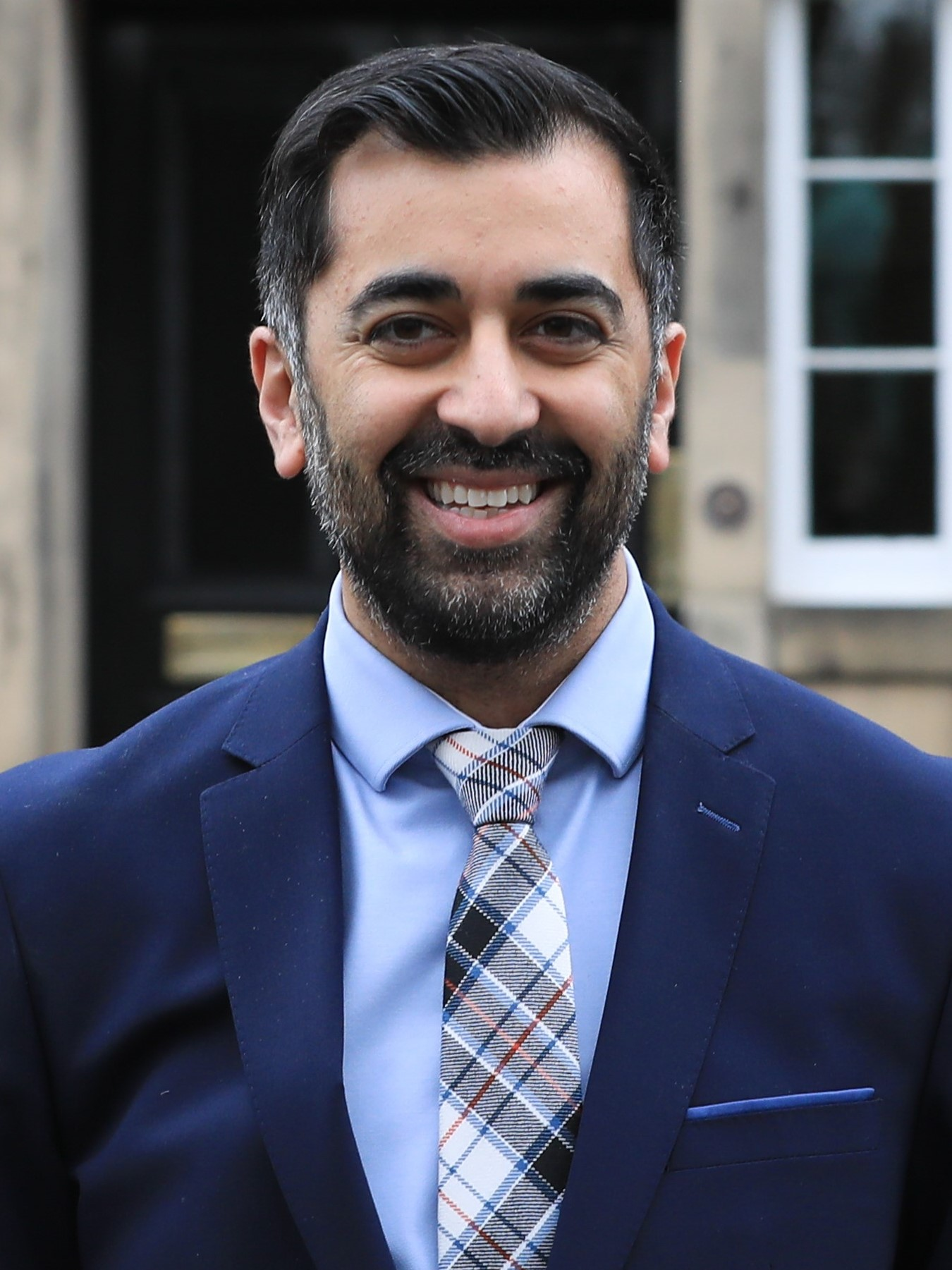
- Humza Yousaf on the day of his appointment as First Minister of Scotland
  29 March
  - Charles III begins a state visit to Germany, his first official overseas trip as monarch.
  - The UK government introduces the Victims and Prisoners Bill into the House of Commons, which will give ministers the power to veto the release of some prisoners, and restrict marriage in prison for those serving whole life terms.
  - Immigration Minister Robert Jenrick confirms the government's intention to utilise three locations, including two former military bases, to house migrants arriving into the UK as asylum seekers. The plans are an attempt by the government to save on hotel expenses.
  - Humza Yousaf is sworn in as Scotland's First Minister at Edinburgh's Court of Session and begins naming his cabinet.
- 30 March
  - The government publishes its latest net zero strategy for the period to 2050, following a High Court ruling that its earlier plans were insufficient to meet climate targets.
  - High-profile inmate Charles Bronson loses his latest bid for freedom.
  - Thomas Cashman, 34, is convicted of shooting dead nine-year-old Olivia Pratt-Korbel in her Liverpool home in August 2022.
  - The Parliamentary Standards Committee recommends that former Scottish National Party MP Margaret Ferrier be suspended from the House of Commons for 30 days for breaching COVID-19 regulations in September 2020 when she took a train home from London following a positive COVID test.
- 31 March
  - Figures released by the Office for National Statistics show an 0.1% growth in the UK economy for the final three months of 2022, revising previous figures that had suggested no growth over that period.
  - COVID-19 in the UK: The UK Health Security Agency confirms the NHS COVID-19 contact tracing app will close on 27 April following a decline in its use.

=== April ===
- 1 April
  - It is reported that three British men are being held in custody by the Taliban in Afghanistan.
  - Manchester becomes the first city in the UK to launch a tourist tax, with a £1-per room per night City Visitor Charge.
- 2 April
  - Home Secretary Suella Braverman confirms the UK is in negotiations with the Taliban following the reported arrest of three British nationals in Afghanistan.
  - Braverman says that Rwanda is a safe place for the UK to send refugees after being asked about refugees being shot there by police at a demonstration in 2018, saying "that might be 2018, we're looking at 2023 and beyond".
- 3 April
  - Members of the Public and Commercial Services Union working at the Passport Office begin a five-week strike over pay and conditions.
  - The National Education Union announces two further strike dates in England on 27 April and 2 May, stating that the offer from the pay UK government is unacceptable, not fully funded, and does not address a shortage of teachers.
  - The cost of a first class stamp increases by 15p to £1.10, and a second class stamp by 7p to 75p.
  - Thomas Cashman is sentenced at Manchester Crown Court to life imprisonment with a minimum term of 42 years for the murder of Olivia Pratt-Korbel, meaning he will be in his mid-70s before becoming eligible for parole.
- 4 April
  - Royal Mail issue new stamps featuring King Charles III, with an increase of a first class stamp up by 15p to £1.10, while the cost of a second class stamp has risen by 7p to 75p.
  - TikTok is fined £12.7m by the Information Commissioner's Office for failing to protect the privacy of children after sharing their information without parental permission.
  - Immigration Minister Robert Jenrick is given a six-month driving ban by magistrates after he was caught speeding on the M1.
  - Former prime minister of New Zealand Jacinda Ardern is appointed a trustee of the Prince of Wales' Earthshot Prize.
  - British boxer Amir Kahn is banned from competing professionally for two years after an anti-doping test revealed the presence of a banned substance following his February 2022 fight with Kell Brook.
  - Coronation of Charles III and Camilla
    - The official invitation from King Charles III and Queen Camilla is unveiled and sent to about 2,000 guests.
    - Madame Tussauds Blackpool announce that a new waxwork of King Charles III will be unveiled in May.
- 5 April
  - The government confirms plans to use the vessel Bibby Stockholm to house around 500 male migrants off the Dorset Coast, citing the cheaper cost of doing so compared to housing them in hotels.
  - A BBC News investigation claims the life coaching organisation Lighthouse is operated as a cult.
  - The White House press secretary, Karine Jean-Pierre, said that US president Joe Biden has accepted an invitation from King Charles for an undated state visit to the United Kingdom.
- 6 April
  - Buckingham Palace announces that it is co-operating with a study being jointly conducted by the University of Manchester and Historic Royal Palaces that is exploring links between the British monarchy and the slave trade in the 17th and 18th centuries.
  - Charles III and Camilla attend the King's first Royal Maundy Service at York Minster, where he distributes Maundy money to pensioners.
- 7 April
  - The Foreign and Commonwealth Office confirms that two British-Israeli sisters in their 20s have been killed during a shooting attack on their car in the northern West Bank. Their mother, also injured in the incident, dies on 10 April.
  - The Bank of England announces that they have begun printing Series G banknotes featuring King Charles III. No additional changes are made to the existing designs of £5, £10, £20 and £50 notes, which will enter circulation from mid-2024.
- 10 April – Coronation of Charles III and Camilla: Buckingham Palace confirms that King Charles III and Queen Camilla will travel to Westminster in the more modern Diamond Jubilee State Coach for the coronation, before returning to Buckingham Palace in the more traditional Gold State Coach.
- 11 April
  - The CBI, one of the UK's largest business groups, dismisses Director-General Tony Danker following complaints about his conduct involving a female employee. Rain Newton-Smith, who served as the CBI's chief economist until March 2023, is appointed to replace Danker.
  - The International Monetary Fund predicts that the UK economy will be among the worst performing in the G20 nations during 2023.
  - US president Joe Biden arrives in Belfast to mark the 25th anniversary of the Good Friday Agreement.
- 12 April
  - The Scottish Government announces it will mount a legal challenge against the UK government's decision to block the Gender Recognition Reform (Scotland) Bill.
  - Prime Minister Rishi Sunak meets with US president Joe Biden at the Grand Central Hotel in Belfast.
  - Biden makes a keynote speech at the Ulster University during which he urges Northern Ireland's politicians to restore the power-sharing government.
  - A 74-year-old man is extradited from Pakistan and charged with murdering police officer Sharon Beshenivsky in November 2005.
  - Tesco reduces the price of a four pint bottle of milk from £1.65 to £1.55 following a cut in wholesale prices.
  - Coronation of Charles III and Camilla: Buckingham Palace confirms that the Duke of Sussex will attend the coronation, but that the Duchess will remain in the United States with their children.
- 13 April
  - Data published by the Office for National Statistics shows a 0% growth in the UK economy during February as growth in the construction industry was offset by industrial action.
  - Publication of the Deciphering Developmental Disorders study, a study involving children with development disorders, which has identified 60 new health conditions.
  - Sainsbury's follows Tesco in cutting the price of milk.
  - A report published by Diabetes UK indicates the UK is heading for what the charity describes as a "rapidly escalating diabetes crisis", with 4.3 million people experiencing a form of diabetes, a further 850,000 estimated to be living with the disease but unaware of it, and another 2.4 million people at risk of developing the condition. Cases of diabetes are more prevalent in less affluent areas of the country.
- 14 April
  - Ford receives government approval for its "BlueCruise" Level 2 autonomous driving technology.
  - Aldi Süd, Lidl and Asda join Sainsbury's and Tesco in cutting the retail price of milk.
  - Several thousand workers with the Environment Agency belonging to the UNISON trade union begin a three-day strike over pay and conditions.
  - Coronation of Charles III and Camilla
    - Official chinaware manufactured by the Royal Collection Trust, in Stoke-on-Trent is unveiled.
    - Media, including BBC News, report that Sarah, Duchess of York has not been invited to the coronation.
    - Some details of the Coronation Concert are revealed, with acts including Katy Perry, Lionel Richie and Take That confirmed as part of the line-up.
- 15 April
  - The SNP's National Executive Committee orders a review of the party's transparency and governance.
  - Merseyside Police say that 118 people have been arrested at Aintree Racecourse after protestors delay the start of the 2023 Grand National. The race, which is delayed by 14 minutes, is won by Corach Rambler, ridden by Derek Fox.
- 16 April – The building of all new smart motorways is cancelled over cost and safety concerns.
- 17 April
  - The 2023 World Snooker Championship is disrupted by a protestor from Just Stop Oil who climbs onto the snooker table during a match between Robert Milkins and Joe Perry and pours orange powder over it. Two people are later arrested by South Yorkshire Police.
  - The Parliamentary Commissioner for Standards is to investigate Prime Minister Rishi Sunak over a possible failure to declare an interest over a childcare company in which his wife has shares.
  - Sunak announces a review of the "core maths content" taught in England's schools, with the establishment of a panel to conduct the review.
  - New rules from Ofgem will prohibit the forced installation of prepayment meters for gas and electricity customers over the age of 85. Customers in debt will also have more time to clear their debt before being forced to switch to a prepayment meter. But plans to resume the practice are subsequently criticised by campaigners who want it banned completely.
- 19 April
  - Inflation is reported to have fallen from 10.4% in February to 10.1% in March. It remains higher than forecasted, driven largely by the ongoing rise in food prices, which continue to increase at their fastest rate in 45 years.
  - Colin Beattie resigns as SNP treasurer with immediate effect after his questioning by Police Scotland in their ongoing investigation into the party's finances.
- 20 April – Prime Minister Rishi Sunak is handed the findings of an investigation into bullying allegations against Deputy Prime Minister Dominic Raab.
- 21 April
  - Dominic Raab resigns as deputy prime minister after the inquiry finds he acted in an "intimidating" and "insulting" manner with civil servants. He is succeeded by Oliver Dowden, who becomes deputy prime minister, and Alex Chalk, who takes on the role of Secretary of State for Justice. Raab subsequently criticises what he describes as "activist civil servants" attempting to block the work of government.
  - The Confederation of British Industry (CBI) announces it is suspending all key activities until June after a number of companies, including John Lewis & Partners, BMW and Virgin Media O2, withdraw from the organisation following the emergence of allegations of sexual assault and rape.
  - Leaders of the Communication Workers Union recommend their members working for Royal Mail accept a pay offer worth 10% over the next three years.
  - The climate protest group Extinction Rebellion begins four days of demonstrations in central London to coincide with Earth Day, and which they describe as "The Big One".
- 22 April – Sunak holds an emergency COBRA meeting to discuss the evacuation of British nationals caught up in the Sudan conflict.
- 23 April
  - Diane Abbott is suspended from the Labour Party after writing a letter in The Observer in which she downplays racism against Irish people, Jews, and Travellers.
  - Sunak confirms that British diplomats and their families have been evacuated from Sudan in a "complex and rapid" operation.
  - The Emergency Alerts service is tested by the government at 3pm BST. An estimated 80% of smartphones are believed to be compatible to receive the alert, but around 7% of those do not receive it. Many people on the Three network report that the alert failed to appear on their phone, while others do not receive it because their phone is switched to aeroplane mode or they have disabled emergency alerts.
  - 2023 London Marathon: Sifan Hassan wins the women's race, while Kelvin Kiptum wins the men's event and breaks the course record.
- 25 April
  - Downing Street confirms the first UK evacuation flight carrying British citizens has left Sudan.
  - High Court documents reveal that Prince William was paid a "very large sum" by News Group Newspapers, owners of The Sun, to settle historical phone-hacking claims.
  - Data published by the Office for National Statistics indicates government borrowing for the year up to 31 March 2023 to be £139.2bn, less than the £152bn that had been forecast by the Office for Budget Responsibility prior to the 2023 budget.
- 26 April
  - Andrew Bridgen is expelled from the Conservative Party after comparing COVID-19 vaccines to the Holocaust and being found to have breached lobbying rules.
  - The first evacuation flight from Sudan lands in the UK.
  - The Illegal Migration Bill passes its final stage in the House of Commons, with MPs voting 289–230 in favour of the bill.
  - The UK's Competition and Markets Authority blocks Microsoft's £55bn deal to buy US video game company Activision Blizzard, citing concerns about reduced choice for gamers and reduced innovation; the move needed the approval of competition regulators in the United States, United Kingdom and European Union.
- 27 April
  - Three days of fresh train strikes are called after both ASLEF and the RMT reject a pay offer from the Rail Delivery Group. The strikes dates are announced for 13 May 31 May and 3 June (ASLEF) and 13 May (RMT).
  - Following a hearing at the High Court, Mr Justice Linden rules that the nurses' strike planned for 30 April – 2 May is partially unlawful as it falls partly outside the six-month period from when members of the Royal College of Nursing voted to strike. The strike is cut short by a day as a consequence.
  - The NHS COVID-19 contact tracing app closes down.
- 28 April – Richard Sharp resigns as chairman of the BBC over his breach of the BBC's rules regarding public appointments after failing to declare his connection to a loan secured by former prime minister Boris Johnson worth £800,000.
- 29 April
  - Coronation of Charles III and Camilla: Organisers announce that among the changes to the ceremony for the coronation will be to invite people watching proceedings to swear allegiance to the King and his heirs. The service will also include female clergy and representatives from several different religions.
  - The Guardian apologises following the publication of a cartoon depicting former BBC chairman Richard Sharp, who is Jewish, with exaggerated features and carrying a puppet of Rishi Sunak, after it was criticised for being antisemitic.
  - The final UK rescue flight from the Sudanese capital of Khartoum takes off as the rescue of UK nationals comes to an end. Another flight from Port Sudan is subsequently arranged for 1 May.
- 30 April
  - Eight people are stabbed, one fatally, in a street brawl near a nightclub in Bodmin, Cornwall. Police arrest a 24-year-old man on suspicion of murdering another man in his 30s. The deceased victim is subsequently named as Michael Allen, aged 32.
  - Alex Chalk, the Secretary of State for Justice, announces new rules for terrorists in prison in England and Wales which will see them limited to two boxes of books and prevented from leading religious meetings.

=== May ===
- 1 May
  - Coronation of Charles III and Camilla: The Royal Collection Trust confirms that Charles III will use a recycled throne chair from the coronation of George VI for his own coronation in a bid to make the event more sustainable. Camilla will use a chair from the same coronation that was used by Queen Elizabeth the Queen Mother.
  - The 2023 World Snooker Championship concludes, with Belgium's Luca Brecel defeating England's Mark Selby 18–15 in the final to win his first world title. Brecel becomes the first player from Mainland Europe to win a World Championship.
- 2 May
  - The 5% pay increase for one million NHS staff in England is signed off at a meeting between the UK government and representatives from 14 trade unions; all NHS employees but doctors and dentists are represented at the meeting.
  - A man is arrested outside Buckingham Palace after throwing shotgun cartridges into the grounds. A controlled explosion is also carried out by police.
- 3 May – Coronation of Charles III and Camilla: As the Metropolitan Police release details of security measures in place, Security Minister Tom Tugendhat says that anti-monarchy groups will be allowed to protest at the coronation.
- 4 May
  - 2023 United Kingdom local elections: The Conservatives incur significant losses, while Labour and the Lib Dems gain control of a number of councils from the Conservatives. The Green Party also make record gains, with over 200 councillors, and win majority control of Mid Suffolk District Council, the party's first ever council majority. The UK Independence Party, which had 500 council seats in 2014, loses the remainder of its councillors.
  - Members of the RMT vote to renew the union's mandate to take strike action for a further six months.
- 5 May – Following the first conviction for trafficking for the purposes of organ removal in England and Wales, Nigerian senator Ike Ekweremadu is sentenced to nine years and eight months in prison after bringing a young street trader to the UK in order to procure his kidney for a transplant. The senator's wife and a doctor who also assisted in the plan are also sent to prison.
- 6 May
  - Coronation of Charles III and Camilla:
    - The Coronation takes place at Westminster Abbey, London, with the two-hour ceremony emphasising diversity and inclusion. There are contributions from several faiths, including Muslim, Jewish, Hindu, Buddhist and Sikh representatives, while elements of the ceremony are also held in the Welsh and Gaelic languages.
    - Graham Smith, leader of the Republic pressure group, is arrested at a protest in Trafalgar Square prior to the coronation.
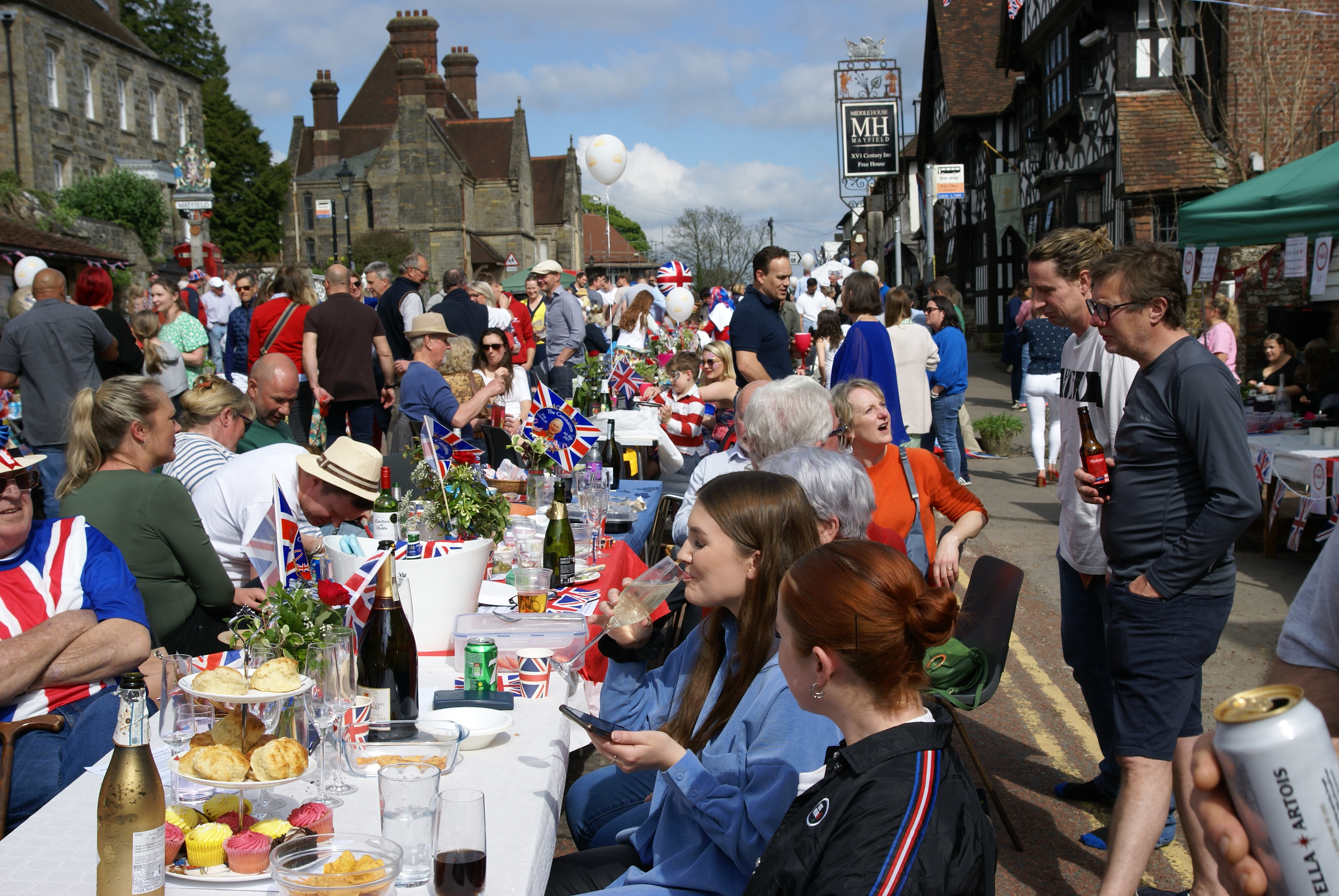
- Coronation Big Lunch street party in Mayfield, East Sussex
  7 May
  - Coronation of Charles III and Camilla:
    - Coronation Big Lunch events take place across the country along with street parties in various locations.
    - The Coronation Concert takes place at Windsor Castle.
    - Officials at Westminster City Council say they are "deeply concerned" at the arrest of three women's safety volunteers hours before the Coronation. In response the Metropolitan Police says it "received intelligence" people "were planning to use rape alarms to disrupt the procession".
- 8 May
  - Skipton Building Society becomes the first building society since the 2008 financial crisis to announce it will offer 100% mortgages, aimed at first-time buyers who cannot afford a deposit.
  - Coronation of Charles III and Camilla:
    - Official photographs of the King and Queen taken shortly after the Coronation ceremony are released.
    - On the final day of celebrations, people are encouraged to get involved in the Big Help Out by joining volunteer projects across the UK.
- 9 May
  - House of Commons Speaker Sir Lindsay Hoyle unveils two new stained glass windows at the Palace of Westminster. One featuring his new personal coat of arms, with a rugby league ball, bees and Lancashire roses. The other window celebrates Britain's Coat of Arms of all three Crown Dependencies and all sixteen British Overseas Territories. Hoyle said at the unveiling the windows were and "will forever be tangible reminders of the strong, close links between the United Kingdom, the overseas territories and the crown dependencies".
  - A Freedom of Information request filed by The Guardian reveals that at least one baby has been born with the DNA of three people, with 0.1% of the third person's DNA used in an attempt to prevent children developing mitochondrial diseases.
  - Addressing the issue of arrests made during the Coronation, Sir Mark Rowley, Commissioner of the Metropolitan Police, says it is unfortunate people were not allowed to protest, but that there was a credible threat to disrupt the ceremony.
- 10 May
  - Transgender woman Lexi-Rose Crawford is sentenced to 9 years in prison for raping a female victim, with the sentence to be served in a men's prison.
  - The government confirms it will replace its plan for all EU-era legislation to expire at the end of 2023 with a list of 600 laws it wishes to replace.
  - Vodafone confirms it will begin switching off its 3G network from June, prompting concerns that people with older and more basic phones could experience "digital poverty".
  - The legal case Duke of Sussex v Mirror Group Newspapers begins at the High Court.
  - Adam Price announces his resignation as leader of Plaid Cymru after a report found a culture of misogyny, harassment and bullying in the party.
- 11 May
  - Wind power is reported as the main source of electricity generation in the UK for the first three months of the year, overtaking gas.
  - The government announces that TransPennine Express will be stripped of its contract and nationalised, due to poor service and cancelled trains.
  - The Bank of England raises its baseline interest rate for the 12th consecutive time, from 4.25% to 4.5%, increasing mortgage and loan costs, but increasing savings income for many.
  - Defence Secretary Ben Wallace confirms that the UK will supply Storm Shadow cruise missiles to Ukraine, to assist the country in repelling the Russian invasion. These have a much longer range (250 km/155 mi) than US-supplied HIMARS missiles (80 km/50 mi).
- 12 May
  - Data from the Office for National Statistics indicates the UK economy grew by 0.1% between January and March 2023, with ongoing strike action and the cost of living crisis contributing to the smaller than expected growth.
  - Following a three-week trial at Newcastle Crown Court, David Boyd is convicted of the October 1992 murder of Nikki Allan in Sunderland.
- 13 May
  - An inquiry is launched into possible "intentional damage" of a Royal Navy warship after around 60 cables were cut on HMS Glasgow at Scotstoun on the River Clyde.
  - The final of the 2023 Eurovision Song Contest takes place in Liverpool. The contest is won by Sweden's Loreen with the song "Tattoo", who becomes only the second person and the first woman to win the contest twice. The United Kingdom's Mae Muller finishes 25th with her song "I Wrote a Song".
- 14 May – Former Archbishop of York Lord Sentamu is forced to resign his position as an assistant bishop in the Church of England Diocese of Newcastle following a report that criticised his handling of a child sex abuse case during his tenure as Archbishop of York.
- 15 May
  - The sixteen heraldic shields of the British Overseas Territories and the three coat of arms of the Crown Dependencies are "immortalised" in two new stained glass windows, unveiled in the Speaker's House at the New Palace of Westminster. House of Commons Speaker, Sir Lindsay Hoyle said "The two windows represent part of our United Kingdom family".
  - Ukrainian president Volodymyr Zelenskyy visits the UK to hold talks with Prime Minister Rishi Sunak. Sunak later announces that the UK will send Ukraine hundreds of air defence missiles and armed drones, in addition to the Storm Shadow cruise missiles previously promised.
- 16 May
  - Following a trial at Reading Crown Court, three fraudsters who supplied forged passports to some of the UK's most notorious criminals, are sentenced to prison.
  - Data produced by the Office for National Statistics indicates the number of people not working because of a long-term health condition has reached two and a half million. The rise is attributed to an increase in mental health problems among young people, and an increase in people suffering back and neck problems as a result of working at home.
  - Stellantis, owners of Vauxhall, Peugeot, Citroen and Fiat, urge the UK government to renegotiate parts of its Brexit trade deal, warning that the UK could lose its car industry. The company has committed to making electric vehicles in the UK, but says it may not be able to do so because of the combined effect of post-Brexit trade rules and increases in raw material costs.
- 17 May
  - The Renters (Reform) Bill is introduced into Parliament.
  - The UK government bans the issuing of licences for animal testing of chemicals used in cosmetics products.
- 18 May
  - 2023 Northern Ireland local elections: Local elections are held in Northern Ireland, two weeks after the rest of the country.
  - Figures released by HM Treasury indicate the funeral of Elizabeth II and associated events cost the UK government £162m.
- 19 May
  - John Allan announces he is stepping down as chairman of Tesco following allegations over his conduct.
  - Tejay Fletcher, who founded and helped to run the iSpoof website that was used by criminals to pose as organisations such as banks and His Majesty's Revenue and Customs for the purposes of fraud by disguising their phone numbers, is sentenced to 13 years and four months in prison following a trial at Southwark Crown Court.
- 20 May – 2023 Northern Ireland local elections: Sinn Féin become the largest political party in Northern Ireland after making significant gains in the local election votes.
- 21 May – Labour and the Liberal Democrats call for an inquiry into whether the home secretary, Suella Braverman, broke the Ministerial Code after it is reported she asked civil servants whether they could arrange a private speed awareness course, rather than the standard group one, after she was caught speeding in summer 2022 during her tenure as attorney general.
- 22 May
  - Buckingham Palace declines a request for the remains of Prince Alemayehu, brought to the UK as a child in the 19th century and buried at Windsor Castle following his death, to be returned to his native Ethiopia.
  - Margaret Ferrier loses her appeal against a proposed 30 day ban from the House of Commons over her breach of COVID-19 rules in September 2020.
  - Sir Richard Branson's rocket company Virgin Orbit ceases operations, following a recent mission failure and financial difficulties.
- 23 May
  - The International Monetary Fund upgrades its growth forecast for the UK, which it says will now avoid a recession in 2023.
  - Following his conviction on 12 May, David Boyd is sentenced to a minimum term of 29 years in prison for Nikki Allan's murder.
  - The Cabinet Office refers former prime minister Boris Johnson to the police following fresh allegations of rule breaches during the COVID-19 pandemic.
- 24 May
  - Inflation is reported to have fallen from 10.1% in March to 8.7% in April. Food price growth remains close to record highs, at 19.1%.
  - Prime Minister Rishi Sunak confirms that Home Secretary Suella Braverman's handling of a speeding offence did not breach ministerial rules and that she will not face an investigation.
- 25 May
  - Net migration into the UK during 2022 is reported to have reached a record high of 606,000, with immigration estimated at 1.2m and emigration at 557,000. Around 114,000 people came from Ukraine and 52,000 from Hong Kong.
  - Three activists from climate change protest group Just Stop Oil are arrested for criminal damage after disrupting the Chelsea Flower Show.
  - Armed officers arrest a man after he crashes a car into the gates of Downing Street. The incident is not terrorism related.
- 26 May
  - British Cycling announces that transgender women are to be banned from the female category of its competitions, following a nine-month review and consultation. This follows the March ban by UK Athletics.
  - Phillip Schofield announces he is leaving ITV, following his recent departure from This Morning amid controversy over the relationship he had with a "much younger" male colleague.
  - Passengers arriving into the UK face delays at several airports after passport e-gates stop working. The problem, attributed to technical problems, is resolved by the following evening.
- 27 May – Post Office Limited issues an apology over the use of racist terms to describe postmasters wrongly investigated as part of the Horizon IT scandal.
- 28 May
  - The Home Office announces it is launching an ad campaign on social media in Albania to deter migrants from coming to the UK; the campaign begins the following day.
  - BBC News reports that Andrei Kelin, Russia's ambassador to the UK, has warned that the west's supply of weapons to Ukraine risks escalating the war to levels not seen so far.
- 29 May
  - Mars bars, one of the top-selling chocolate bars in the UK, are given a new look with recyclable paper wrappers, in a bid to cut down on the growing problem of plastic waste.
  - The Met Police's plan to stop attending emergency mental health incidents is described as "potentially alarming" by a former inspector of constabulary, with charity Mind also expressing concerns.
- 30 May
  - Figures published by the British Retail Consortium show that supermarket prices rose in May, largely because of the price of coffee, chocolate and non-food goods.
  - The UK government announces plans to close a loophole in the law that allows shopkeepers to give free vape samples to those under the age of majority.
- 31 May
  - Two people die and eight others are injured during an incident at the beach in Bournemouth.
  - ASLEF members hold their latest strike as part of an ongoing dispute over pay and conditions, causing widespread disruption to rail services. Further action is planned for Saturday, the day of the FA Cup Final, and on Friday by members of RMT.
  - A huge wildfire covering 30 mi^{2} (78 km^{2}), possibly the largest ever seen in the UK, is brought under control by the Scottish Fire and Rescue Service at Cannich in the Highlands.

=== June ===
- 1 June
  - House prices in the UK are reported to have fallen by 3.4% in the year to May, the biggest decline since July 2009. The average property price is now estimated at £260,736.
  - A ban on e-scooters carried on Southeastern, Southern, Thameslink and Gatwick Express trains comes into force, due to concerns over fire risk.
- 2 June – A visibly emotional Phillip Schofield gives an interview with the BBC's Amol Rajan, in which he apologises and says his "career is over" following the affair with a young male colleague.
- 3 June
  - Train strikes staged by the ASLEF union cause disruption to the 2023 FA Cup final and a Beyoncé Knowles concert.
  - In the FA Cup Final, the first in the 152-year history of the competition to feature a Manchester derby, Manchester City defeat rivals Manchester United 2–1 to win their seventh FA Cup trophy.
  - A man is arrested at the FA Cup final after being pictured wearing a Manchester United shirt with the number 97 and the slogan "not enough", believed to be a reference to the Hillsborough disaster. The 33-year-old male is subsequently charged with displaying threatening or abusive writing likely to cause harassment, alarm or distress.
  - A protestor is detained by police after attempting to disrupt the 2023 Epsom Derby by trespassing on the track.
- 6 June
  - Record high numbers of gonorrhoea and syphilis infections are reported, following a dip during previous years.
  - Prince Harry becomes the first senior member of the British royal family to give evidence in a court case in more than 130 years when he appears at the High Court to give evidence in his case against Mirror Group Newspapers.
  - The Advertising Standards Authority bans a 2022 campaign by Shell plc for being "likely to mislead" consumers.
- 7 June
  - Figures produced by Halifax Bank indicate house prices have dropped by 1% compared to 2022, the first such fall since 2012.
  - It is announced that The Daily Telegraph and Sunday Telegraph, as well as The Spectator, are to be put up for sale to recover debts incurred by the publications' parent company.
- 8 June
  - Prime Minister Rishi Sunak holds a joint press conference with US president Joe Biden at the White House to announce the Atlantic Declaration, an agreement to strengthen economic ties between the UK and US.
  - Caroline Lucas, the Green Party's former leader and only MP, announces that she is stepping down from Parliament at the next election.
- 9 June
  - The UK government announces that the planned windfall tax on oil and gas companies will be suspended if prices return to normal levels for a sustained period.
  - Nadine Dorries announces she will stand down as Conservative MP for Mid Bedfordshire with immediate effect, triggering a by-election. On 14 June 2023 she said that she had submitted a subject access request to the House of Lords Appointments Commission (HOLAC) and was waiting to resign until she had received all unredacted "WhatsApps, text messages, all emails and minutes of meetings" related to why she was denied a peerage. Dorries eventually resigns on 26 August., 78 days after her initial announcement of "immediate effect".
  - Boris Johnson's Resignation Honours are published. Highlights include knighthoods for Jacob Rees-Mogg and Simon Clarke, and a damehood for Priti Patel. The decision to award a life peerage to former special adviser Charlotte Owen is criticised due to her young age (29) and perceived lack of experience or contributions to British society.
  - Johnson announces he will stand down as an MP with immediate effect after receiving the Commons Select Committee of Privileges's report into the Partygate scandal, triggering a by-election.
- 10 June
  - Nigel Adams becomes the third Conservative MP in quick succession to stand down from Parliament with immediate effect, triggering a by-election.
  - Temperatures reach above 30 °C for the first time since 24 August 2022, marking the hottest day of the year so far. Three guardsmen collapse during a military parade in London, due to the heat.
  - Manchester City beat Inter Milan in the 2023 UEFA Champions League Final 1–0, with Rodri scoring the only goal to win the UEFA Champions League for the first time in their history. They become the second English team ever to win the Continental Treble after Manchester United in the 1998-99 Manchester United F.C. season, winning the FA Cup and the Premier League alongside the UEFA Champions League.
- 11 June
  - Energy Secretary Grant Shapps, speaking on Sunday with Laura Kuenssberg, declares that the country "wants to move on" from Boris Johnson and dismisses claims the ex-PM was the victim of a "witch hunt".
  - Police Scotland arrest Scotland's former First Minister, Nicola Sturgeon, as part of their ongoing investigation into the SNP's finances. She is subsequently released without charge.
- 12 June
  - Following a period of hot weather, thunderstorms and torrential rain bring flash flooding to parts of the UK.
  - A mother-of-three is sentenced to 28 months in prison for inducing an abortion at home during 2020 with medication while she was 32–34 weeks pregnant. The medication was obtained following a remote consultation at which the woman misled doctors over the advancement of her pregnancy.
- 13 June
  - 2023 Nottingham attacks: A major incident is declared in Nottingham, with much of the city centre cordoned off, following a vehicle-ramming and knife attack. A 31-year-old man is arrested on suspicion of multiple murders, following the deaths of three people including two university students, while three others are hospitalised.
  - The first day of a public inquiry into the COVID-19 pandemic begins in central London. The inquiry's lead lawyer says "very little thought" was given about the impact of a national lockdown and that Brexit planning may have occupied too much of the government's time and resources, while a counsel for the Covid-19 Bereaved Families for Justice accuses the authorities of being "complacent".
  - A heatwave is declared in several parts of the UK as temperatures reach 30 °C, and after exceeding 25 °C for three consecutive days; the UK's heat-health alert is also extended.
- 14 June
  - Vodafone and Three announce a merger, pending approval from regulators, to create the largest mobile company in the UK.
  - Thousands of people gather for a vigil to mourn the victims of the attacks in Nottingham. Police continue questioning a suspect, as the BBC obtains CCTV footage of a man believed to be the perpetrator.
  - Researchers at the University of Cambridge report the creation of the first synthetic human embryo from stem cells, without the need for sperm or egg cells.
- 15 June
  - Partygate: A 13-month investigation by the House of Commons' Privileges Committee concludes that ex-Prime Minister Johnson deliberately misled the Commons over gatherings during pandemic restrictions at 10 Downing Street and Chequers. The report proposes that he would be suspended for 90 days if still an MP. It states that he deliberately misled the House and the committee, impugned the committee and was "complicit in the campaign of abuse and attempted intimidation of the Committee".
  - The Parole Board announces that double child killer and rapist Colin Pitchfork has been granted parole and will be released from prison. Alberto Costa, MP for South Leicestershire where the girls were killed, writes to the Justice Secretary to seek "an immediate and urgent review" of the decision.
- 16 June
  - A hosepipe and sprinkler ban is announced for Kent and Sussex, beginning on 26 June, after water demand hits record levels.
  - The Ministry of Justice confirms that serial killer Levi Bellfield, who is serving two whole life sentences for murder, will be allowed to marry his girlfriend in prison as there are no legal restrictions preventing him from doing so.
  - Boris Johnson breaks the Ministerial Code for a second time, by not asking advice from the Advisory Committee on Business Appointments before accepting a new job writing for the Daily Mail. The previous time was shortly after he stood down as foreign secretary in July 2018, when he accepted a similar job with the Daily Telegraph.
  - A 31-year-old man is charged with three counts of murder and three of attempted murder following the Nottingham attacks.
- 17 June
  - David Warburton, the MP for Somerton and Frome, becomes the fourth Conservative MP in eight days to announce their resignation from the House of Commons, doing so following his suspension from the party over allegations of sexual misconduct, and triggering a by-election in his constituency.
  - The 2023 Trooping the Colour ceremony takes place.
- 18 June – Partygate: The Mirror publishes video footage of a party held in December 2020 at Conservative Party Headquarters. Housing Secretary Michael Gove describes the incident as "indefensible".
- 19 June – Partygate: MPs back, by 354 votes to seven, a report finding Boris Johnson deliberately misled the Commons over lockdown parties at Downing Street.
- 20 June
  - The Chancellor, Jeremy Hunt, rules out direct financial support for mortgage holders, over fears it would "make inflation worse, not better".
  - British businessmen Hamish Harding and Shahzada Dawood, along with Dawood's son, Suleman, are confirmed as being aboard the missing submersible that disappeared during a voyage to see the wreck of the RMS Titanic two days earlier.
- 21 June – UK inflation figures for May 2023 show it remained higher than expected, at 8.7%.
- 22 June
  - The Bank of England raises the official bank rate from 4.5% to 5%, the 13th consecutive rise, and a greater increase than economists had expected.
  - The RMT announces three fresh days of strike action for 20, 22 and 29 July.
- 23 June
  - Banks and building societies are summoned for a meeting with Jeremy Hunt as pressure grows on them to help people struggling with rising mortgage costs. A series of measures are agreed, offering more flexibility.
  - Junior doctors in England announce a new five-day walkout from 13 to 18 July – the longest strike yet – over pay.
  - Following a trial at Northampton Crown Court, Louis De Zoysa is convicted of the 2020 murder of police sergeant Matt Ratana.
- 24 June – The UK government holds an emergency COBRA meeting to discuss the Wagner Group rebellion in Russia. Sunak urges both sides to "be responsible and to protect civilians".
- 25 June
  - A national technical fault affects the 999 service, meaning emergency services are unable to receive calls for around two hours. The service is fully restored by the evening.
  - A spokesman for Sarah, Duchess of York says that she is recovering following surgery for breast cancer at King Edward VII's Hospital a few days earlier.
  - Elton John plays the final UK concert of his farewell tour at Glastonbury 2023, headlining the Pyramid Stage on the festival's final day.
- 26 June
  - A two-year BBC investigation into the 1993 murder of Stephen Lawrence identifies a sixth suspect who was not charged at the time and is now deceased.
  - Banking giant HSBC announces that it will vacate its 45-storey tower at 8 Canada Square in Canary Wharf and establish a smaller headquarters, possibly in the City of London, when its current lease expires in 2027. The move is attributed to an increase in remote work and less need for in-person office work.
  - Prince William and Geri Horner announce the launch of Homewards, a five-year project aimed at reducing the number of homeless people in the UK.
  - The National Cancer Research Institute announces that it will be closing, amid concerns over its funding.
- 27 June
  - Boots announces plans to close 300 of its outlets over the next years, saying it will close stores in close proximity to other branches.
  - A report compiled by the Independent Commission for Equity in Cricket (ICEC) says racism, sexism, classism and elitism are "widespread" in English and Welsh cricket.
- 28 June
  - Daniel Korski withdraws as the Conservative Party's candidate for the 2024 London mayoral election after being accused of groping by novelist and TV producer Daisy Goodwin.
  - A BBC News investigation finds that paedophiles are using Stable Diffusion, a piece of artificial intelligence software, to create lifelike images of child sexual abuse, which are then being distributed through platforms such as Patreon.
- 29 June
  - The plan to deport some asylum seekers to Rwanda is ruled unlawful. In a three-judge decision, the court of appeal overturns a high court decision that previously ruled that Rwanda could be considered a safe third country to send refugees.
  - Smoke from record-breaking Canadian wildfires is detected in the UK, having drifted thousands of kilometres over the Atlantic.
- 30 June
  - Sunak unveils an NHS workforce plan that aims to address shortages in the health service by increasing the number of training places for nurses and doctors, as well as retaining them in the NHS workforce.
  - The Independent Press Standards Organisation rules that a December 2022 column in The Sun newspaper written by Jeremy Clarkson about Meghan, Duchess of Sussex being paraded naked through the streets was sexist, but rejects complaints that it was either discriminatory on the grounds of race, inaccurate, or sought to harass the duchess. Both The Sun and Clarkson had apologised for the piece in December 2022.

=== July ===
- 1 July
  - The Foreign Office issues a travel warning for Britons going to France, as major riots grip the country.
  - The price cap on energy bills is reduced, with an average yearly domestic gas and electricity bill falling by £426 to £2,074.
- 2 July
  - The Public Order Act 2023 comes into effect in England and Wales, giving police greater powers to move environmental protestors who disrupt transport routes.
  - Co-op Funeralcare announces that resomation, a process that uses potassium hydroxide and water to break down human remains, will be made available for funerals in the UK for the first time later in the year.
  - Orkney Islands Council begins movements to change its status, looking at options including becoming either a British Crown Dependency, or a British Overseas Territory of the United Kingdom, or a self-governing territory within the Kingdom of Norway or Denmark.
- 3 July
  - Train drivers belonging to the ASLEF union at 16 train operators begin a six-day overtime ban, threatening disruption to services.
  - The Met Office confirms that the UK has experienced its hottest June on record, with June 2023's average temperature of 15.8 °C beating previous records from 1940 and 1976 by 0.9 °C.
- 4 July
  - The average interest rate on a five-year fixed mortgage deal exceeds 6%.
  - Partygate scandal: The Metropolitan Police announces it is reopening its investigation into a lockdown party held at Conservative Party Headquarters in December 2020, as well as an event held at Westminster on 8 December 2020.
- 5 July
  - King Charles III is presented with the Honours of Scotland during a ceremony held at Edinburgh's St Giles Cathedral.
  - The Ministry of Defence confirms that UK Special Forces are at the centre of a war crimes investigation involving Afghanistan.
  - David Black, the chief executive of Ofwat, suggests that water bills are likely to rise in 2025 as water companies seek to cover the cost of improving services.
- 6 July
  - Two children die, while 15 other people are injured after a Land Rover crashes into a primary school in Wimbledon, south-west London. The crash is not treated as terror-related, but the driver is arrested on suspicion of causing death by dangerous driving.
  - The Parliamentary Commissioner for Standards recommends that MP Chris Pincher be suspended for eight weeks, following an investigation into groping allegations.
  - The government loses a High Court bid to prevent the COVID-19 Inquiry from seeing Boris Johnson's diaries and WhatsApp messages in full.
  - Wallasey pub shooting: Connor Chapman is found guilty of shooting dead 26-year-old Elle Edwards and injuring four others with a submachine gun. Co-defendant Thomas Waring is also found guilty of possessing a prohibited firearm and assisting an offender. The following day, Chapman is sentenced to a minimum of 48 years in prison, and Waring is given a nine-year prison term.
- 7 July
  - Consumer finance expert Martin Lewis speaks to BBC Radio 4 about the growing use of deepfake AI technology, warning that more regulation is needed to prevent online scams.
  - Data published by Halifax Bank indicates that UK house prices have fallen at the fastest rate since 2011, with a 2.6% fall in the last year.
  - A man in his 20s, known publicly only as LXB, becomes the first alleged neo-Nazi in the UK to be placed under special government powers for monitoring and controlling suspected terrorists.
  - Following his trial and conviction at Nottingham Crown Court, Jamie Barrow is sentenced to life imprisonment with a minimum term of 44 years for the murders of a mother and her two children, who died after he set their flat on fire.
  - Empire Cinemas collapses into administration, with the immediate closure of six of its outlets and the remainder at risk of closure.
  - A story printed in The Sun alleges that an unnamed BBC presenter paid a 17-year-old for sexually explicit photos. In response the BBC says it is investigating and that the presenter is not scheduled to be on air in the coming days.
- 8 July
  - Rishi Sunak reaffirms the UK's opposition to the use of cluster munitions, as the United States announces it will send the widely banned weapons to Ukraine, where the invasion has reached its 500th day.
  - Thunderstorms affect parts of the UK as a brief hot spell comes to an end.
- 9 July – The Sun prints fresh allegations about an unnamed BBC presenter, alleging that he stripped down to his underpants during a video call to the teenager. Several male public figures associated with the BBC speak out to say they are not the individual concerned. Culture Secretary Lucy Frazer holds an urgent meeting with BBC Director General Tim Davie at which he tells her the BBC is investigating the matter "swiftly and sensitively". The BBC subsequently confirms it has suspended the presenter and referred the matter to the police.
- 10 July
  - A lawyer representing the young person who was allegedly paid by a BBC presenter for indecent photographs casts doubt on the story. In a letter to the BBC, the lawyer says that his client contacted The Sun on 7 July to tell the newspaper there was "no truth in it". The paper is said to have subsequently printed the "inappropriate article" containing allegations made by the client's mother.
  - EasyJet announces the cancellation of 1,700 flights to and from Gatwick Airport during July, August and September, citing constraints on airspace in Europe and ongoing traffic control difficulties.
- 11 July
  - A second young person comes forward to make allegations about the BBC presenter at the centre of a scandal, claiming that they were contacted by him on a dating app and sent abusive and threatening messages. The person, in their early 20s, also says they felt under pressure to meet up, although they did not do so.
  - The average deal on a two-year fixed mortgage reaches 6.66%, the highest level since the 2008 financial crisis.
- 12 July
  - Huw Edwards is identified by his wife as the BBC presenter being investigated for allegedly paying a 17-year-old for sexually explicit photos. His wife also says that Edwards is receiving in-patient hospital care after an episode of depression following the publication of the allegations. Following an investigation into the allegations, the Metropolitan Police releases a statement to say detectives have determined no criminal offence has been committed.
  - The Bank of England says that rising interest rates mean that mortgages for at least one million borrowers will rise by an average of £500 a month by the end of 2023.
  - The 2.6 GW Hornsea Project 4 is approved by the government, becoming the second-largest UK wind farm to receive planning consent, following Hornsea Project Three.
- 13 July
  - The longest doctor's strike in NHS history begins, as junior doctors begin a five-day walkout over pay.
  - The government offers more than a million public sector workers in England and Wales a pay rise worth an average of 6%. The offer sees police and prison officers in England and Wales offered 7%, with teachers in England offered 6.5%, and junior doctors in England offered 6%.
  - A report published by the Intelligence and Security Committee of Parliament says the UK failed to develop an effective strategy for dealing with threats to its national security by China, which has allowed Chinese intelligence to aggressively target the UK.
- 14 July
  - Data published by the Office for National Statistics indicates one in 20 people surveyed reported running out of food, and being unable to afford to buy more because of rising food prices.
  - The High Court of England and Wales gives its approval to legal challenges against the Home Office by Braintree District Council in Essex and West Lindsey District Council in Lincolnshire over plans to use two former airbases in the areas, Wethersfield Airbase and RAF Scampton, to house asylum seekers.
  - The former Manchester City footballer Benjamin Mendy is cleared of raping a woman and attempting to rape another, following a three-week trial at Chester Crown Court.
  - Abbott Laboratories, producers of the FreeStyle Libre app, used by around 200,000 people with diabetes in the UK, temporarily withdraw the app from the App Store after technical problems with an update caused it to stop working on Apple devices in the UK.
  - Just Stop Oil protesters interrupt the first night of the Proms at London's Royal Albert Hall.
- 15 July – The Local Government Association calls for disposable vapes to be banned in England and Wales by 2024, citing their environmental impact and their appeal to children.
- 17 July
  - A report from the National Audit Office concludes that the UK government is likely to miss its 2019 target to build 40 new NHS hospitals by 2030.
  - As train drivers begin a six-day overtime ban, their union, ASLEF, announces a further six day overtime ban from 31 July.
- 18 July
  - The first British passports are issued featuring King Charles III.
  - A BBC investigation into working conditions at McDonald's has collected together a number of allegations of sexual assault, harassment, bullying and racism.
  - A woman sentenced to 28 months imprisonment for illegally obtaining abortion pills in 2020 has her sentence reduced to a 14-month suspended sentence by the Court of Appeal, and will be released from prison.
  - The Home Office confirms the release of the first passports issued in King Charles III's name.
- 19 July
  - The UK rate of inflation falls from 8.7% in May to 7.9% in June.
  - Rishi Sunak issues an apology for the UK's historical treatment of LGBT people who were dismissed from the military because of their sexuality.
- 20 July
  - Senior doctors begin a two-day walkout, their first strike in a decade, amid an ongoing dispute over pay.
  - The Competition and Markets Authority tells supermarkets they must make their food pricing clearer in order to help shoppers make informed decisions about the best deals.
  - A University of Oxford study suggests that if heavy meat eaters were to cut some of it out of their diet it would be like removing eight million cars from the road.
  - The first phase of the COVID-19 Inquiry comes to an end, with an interim report expected to be published in 2024.
- 21 July
  - July 2023 by-elections:
    - Uxbridge and South Ruislip: The former seat of ex-PM Boris Johnson is held by the Conservatives, but with a significantly reduced majority of 495 votes. The proposed ULEZ expansion by Labour's Sadiq Khan, Mayor of London, is a factor in the result.
    - Selby and Ainsty: Labour takes the formerly safe Conservative seat of Selby and Ainsty. The swing of 23.7% is the largest since 1945.
    - Somerton and Frome: The Liberal Democrats take Somerton and Frome, overturning a Conservative majority of 29.6%.
- 22–23 July – The most successful weekend for UK cinema-going since 2019 is reported, with Oppenheimer and Barbie taking £30m in their box office openings.
- 23 July – The Cabinet Office announces the launch of the Humanitarian Medal for emergency workers and humanitarian relief teams, such as charities, service personnel and health workers.
- 24 July
  - Thousands of Britons begin arriving home from Greece, after being evacuated due to catastrophic wildfires in the region. Travel agency Thomas Cook promises to refund those who booked holidays.
  - The Competition and Markets Authority announces an investigation into companies that offer quickie divorces and will writing.
- 26 July
  - Oscar-winning actor Kevin Spacey is cleared of all charges at London's Southwark Crown Court. His trial had included nine charges, with seven counts of sexual assault against four men.
  - The consultation process for the proposed closure of hundreds of ticket offices at train stations in England is extended until 1 September.
  - Dame Alison Rose admits to being the source of an inaccurate BBC news report about Nigel Farage's Coutts bank account after discussing the matter with BBC business editor Simon Jack, something she describes as a "serious error of judgement". She subsequently resigns from her post early the next day.
- 27 July
  - The Met Office publishes its State of the UK Climate 2022 report. It concludes that the 40 °C heatwave was "extraordinary", but would be considered an average year by 2060 and a cool year by 2100, if current emission trends continue.
  - 26-year-old Louis De Zoysa is sentenced to a whole life order for the murder of police officer Matt Ratana in 2020.
  - Peter Flavel resigns as chief executive of Coutts Bank over controversy surrounding the closure of Nigel Farage's account.
- 28 July – The High Court concludes that Sadiq Khan's plan to extend the Ultra Low Emission Zone (ULEZ) around London is lawful and can proceed.
- 30 July
  - Media outlets, including BBC News, report that the Infrastructure and Projects Authority has given the HS2 project an "unachievable" rating in a report published on 20 July.
  - Sunak orders a review of Low Traffic Neighbourhoods, declaring himself to be on the side of drivers.
- 31 July
  - Sunak announces that over 100 new licenses will be granted for oil and gas drilling in the North Sea, a decision heavily criticised by environmental groups and opposition MPs as incompatible with the UK's climate change commitments. Sunak insists the plan is "entirely consistent" with reaching net zero, and says that a quarter of UK energy needs will come from oil and gas even after 2050.
  - New rules come into force from the Financial Conduct Authority requiring banks to prove they are offering their customers fair value, such as passing on interest rate rises to savers.
  - The final date on which non-barcoded stamps can be used when posting mail.

=== August ===
- 1 August
  - Nationwide reports that house prices fell by 3.8% in July, the sharpest decline since July 2009.
  - The UK's first permanent drone delivery service begins, with Royal Mail and Skyports establishing a daily inter-island mail distribution between three islands on Orkney.
  - Changes on excise duty for alcohol come into force, with the tax levied depending on a drink's strength.
  - Former SNP MP Margaret Ferrier loses her seat, following a successful recall petition, triggering a by-election.
- 2 August – COVID-19 in the UK: The UK Health Security Agency reports the spread of a new variant known as EG.5.1.
- 3 August
  - The National Risk Register publishes its latest report on future threats facing the UK. It puts the chance of another pandemic at between 5% and 25%. Other risks include extreme weather caused by worsening climate change, advances in artificial intelligence (AI) systems, terrorism such as cyberattacks on infrastructure, and the assassination of public figures.
  - Greenpeace activists climb onto the roof of Rishi Sunak's North Yorkshire home, unfurling sheets of black fabric, in protest at his recent decision to expand oil and gas production in the North Sea.
  - The Bank of England raises its baseline interest rate from 5% to 5.25%, the 14th consecutive increase and the highest level since April 2008. The Bank also predicts inflation to fall below 5% in the final quarter of 2023.
  - Brexit: Checks on fresh food from the EU are delayed for a fifth time, amid concerns over red tape.
  - Homeware retailer Wilko files a notice of intention to call in administrators after failing to secure a buyer, putting 12,000 jobs at risk.
  - Butterfly Conservation reports a four-fold increase in red admiral sightings compared to the previous year, likely a result of higher temperatures in the UK.
- 4 August
  - Around 4,000 scouts from the UK attending the World Jamboree in South Korea are to be moved to hotels due to the ongoing 2023 Asia heat wave.
  - A royal spokesman confirms there will be no official public events to mark the first anniversary of the death of Elizabeth II.
  - The mother and stepfather of Jacob Crouch, a 10-month-old baby who died at his Derbyshire home in 2020, are found guilty of causing him severe injuries leading to death. The mother, 33-year-old Gemma Barton, is acquitted of murder, but found guilty of causing or allowing the death of a child, as well as child cruelty, and is sentenced to 10 years in prison. Stepfather Craig Crouch is found guilty of murder and receives a minimum term of 28 years in prison.
  - Storm Antoni hits the UK, the first Met Office-named storm of the year, with forecasters warning of "unseasonably" strong winds that could pose a danger to life over the weekend. A top wind gust of 78 mph is recorded at Berry Head in Devon, which is considered a potential record for the time of year.
  - The biggest NHS privatisation since the Blair years is announced, with eight new community diagnostic centres (CDCs) being planned in a bid to cut record-high waiting lists. A further five NHS-run CDCs are also announced.
- 5 August – The 18th century Crooked House, once known as "Britain's wonkiest pub", is gutted by a fire. The pub is demolished two days later. Police subsequently confirm they are treating the fire as arson.
- 6 August
  - Secretary of State for Justice Alex Chalk confirms that the rule deducting living costs from compensation paid to people who have been wrongfully convicted will be scrapped.
  - Greetings card retailer Clintons are to close around 20% of their outlets to cut back on expenditure.
- 7 August – The first group of asylum seekers to be housed on the Bibby Stockholm while they wait for the cases to be processed arrive on the barge following delays over safety concerns.
- 8 August
  - The Police Service of Northern Ireland issues an apology after a data breach led to the details of its officers being published online.
  - The Electoral Commission warns people to look out for unauthorised use of their data after revealing it was the victim of a "complex cyber-attack" in August 2021, which was not discovered until October 2022.
  - The Joint Committee on Vaccination and Immunisation recommends the Autumn 2023 programme of COVID-19 booster vaccines should be routinely offered to all over-65s, as well as those under 65 in clinical risk groups, care home residents and frontline health workers. This marks a change from 2022 when all adults over 50 were offered the booster. The flu vaccine will also be offered to over 65s after the age was dropped to 50 during the pandemic.
- 9 August – A second Police Service of Northern Ireland data breach is revealed after it emerges a spreadsheet containing the names of 200 officers was stolen from a car in July 2023.
- 10 August
  - High street bargain homeware retailer Wilko goes into administration. The move puts 12,000 jobs across 400 shops at risk.
  - Simon Byrne, the Chief Constable of the Police Service of Northern Ireland, says he is "deeply sorry" about two "industrial scale" data breaches, but will not resign over the controversy.
  - Coronation of Charles III and Camilla: The Royal Mint unveils a special official Coronation 50 pence coin.
- 11 August
  - Data from the Office for National Statistics shows the UK economy grew by an average 0.2% between April and June 2023. This includes a better than expected increase of 0.5% for June as a result of warm weather which boosted both the construction and hospitality industries.
  - Migrants are temporarily moved from the Bibby Stockholm after traces of the Legionella bacteria are found in the water supply.
  - The number of migrants who have crossed the English Channel since 2018 passes 100,000.
- 12 August
  - England captain Harry Kane joins German champions Bayern Munich on a four-year deal, ending his record-breaking career at Tottenham Hotspur.
  - Six people are killed and 58 rescued by British and French coastguards after a boat carrying migrants sinks off the French coast, near Sangatte, in the English Channel.
- 14 August – Health Secretary Steve Barclay confirms "no-one has been harmed" following the discovery of legionella bacteria on the Bibby Stockholm.
- 15 August
  - BBC News reports that five suspected spies for Russia were arrested in February 2023, three of whom have been charged in connection with the allegations.
  - Data published by the Office for National Statistics indicates that average UK wages increased by 7.8% between April and June 2023, their highest increase since comparable figures began in 2001.
- 16 August
  - Data released by the Office for National Statistics indicates that UK rents rose by an average of 5.3% in the year to July 2023, the highest rise since comparable records began in 2016.
  - UK inflation fell from 7.9% in June to 6.8% in July with the fall in energy costs helping to bring it down, but food and hospitality prices remained high and continued to have an impact.
- 17 August – A Level results are published in England, Wales and Northern Ireland, with grades returning to pre-pandemic levels; 27.2% of all grades marked are rated as A* or A.
- 18 August
  - Former nurse Lucy Letby, 33, is found guilty of murdering seven babies, and attempting to murder six others, at the Countess of Chester Hospital between June 2015 and June 2016, following a trial which began 10 months ago. She becomes the most prolific killer of babies in the UK in modern times. She is cleared on two charges of attempted murder, while the jury fails to reach verdicts on two further charges of attempted murder. The UK government orders an independent inquiry into the case.
  - COVID-19 vaccination in the UK: The UK Health Security Agency supports a proposal for the commercial sale of COVID-19 vaccines to the public, for those wishing to top up their immunity, after the age limit on the NHS booster programme is raised from 50 to 65.
  - HM Treasury announces that banks will be fined if they fail to provide people with adequate cash withdrawal and deposit facilities. The policy will require cash withdrawal and deposit facilities to be available within a mile of residents and businesses in an urban setting, and three miles in rural settings.
- 20 August – 2023 FIFA Women's World Cup: Spain win 1–0 against England in the final of the tournament.
- 21 August – Following her conviction on 18 August, Lucy Letby is sentenced at Manchester Crown Court to a whole life order for the 14 charges she was convicted of. Justice James Goss states that her "cruel, calculated and cynical campaign of child murder" means she should never be released from prison.
- 22 August
  - Official figures show that Government borrowing in July was £4.3bn, lower than the £5bn forecast by economists.
  - Former Metropolitan Police officer Adam Provan is jailed for 16 years for multiple rapes against a teenage girl and a female police officer.
  - It is reported that art dealer Ittai Gradel alerted the British Museum about possible missing items in 2021 but was told "all objects were accounted for".
- 23 August – It is reported that doctors at Oxford's Churchill Hospital have carried out the UK's first womb transplant, with a 34-year-old woman receiving her sister's womb in a 17-hour operation that took place in February 2023.
- 24 August
  - Data released by the Home Office shows that 175,000 people were waiting to have their claims for asylum assessed at the end of June 2023, an increase of 44% on the same time in 2022.
  - GCSE results are published in England, Wales and Northern Ireland, with 68.2% of all entries marked at grades 4/C and above. It is the second fall in overall results, taking them almost back to pre-pandemic levels.
- 25 August
  - Ofgem confirms the energy price cap will fall again in October, with an annual gas and electricity bill at around £1,923.
  - The National Crime Agency launches a criminal investigation after linking 88 UK deaths with an online seller from Canada accused of selling them a poisonous substance so they could commit suicide.
- 26 August – Conservative MP Nadine Dorries resigns her Parliamentary seat two months after originally saying she would do so, accusing Prime Minister Rishi Sunak of abandoning "the fundamental principles of Conservatism" and that "history will not judge [him] kindly".
- 28 August – Hundreds of flights to and from the UK are delayed following technical problems with the UK's air traffic control system.
- 29 August
  - Martin Rolfe, chief executive of the National Air Transport Service confirms that an initial investigation into the disruption caused to the UK's air traffic control system indicates it to be as a result of flight data received. As passengers continue to face delays in catching flights, the incident is to be investigated by the Civil Aviation Authority.
- 30 August
  - Prime Minister Rishi Sunak announces plans to introduce legislation that will compel convicted criminals to attend their sentencing hearings, by force if necessary, or face more time in prison.
  - Health Secretary Steve Barclay announces that the inquiry into the circumstances surrounding Lucy Letby's crimes has been upgraded to a statutory hearing, meaning that witnesses can be compelled to give evidence.
  - Property website Zoopla forecasts that UK house sales for 2023 are on course to be at their lowest since 2012, with an estimated one million completed by the end of the year, a fifth lower than 2022.

=== September ===
- 1 September
  - A crisis emerges in schools, hospitals, and other public buildings, centred around the use of reinforced autoclaved aerated concrete (RAAC), a widely used but outdated material believed to be unsafe and in danger of crumbling. The announcements come just days before the beginning of the new academic year.
  - Figures published by the Nationwide Building Society indicate UK house prices in August 2023 were 5.3% lower than those in August 2022, the largest fall since 2009.
  - Octopus Energy announces plans to buy Shell Energy, giving Octopus an additional 1.4 million customers.
- 3 September
  - Chancellor Jeremy Hunt says the UK government will "spend what it takes" to put right the problem of defective concrete in schools, and says that structural problems could be identified in more schools and other public buildings.
  - Tesco chief executive Ken Murphy announces that staff at the retailer will be offered body cameras following a rise in violent incidents.
  - UK government data indicates 872 migrants crossed the English Channel the previous day, the highest daily number of 2023.
- 4 September
  - Labour leader Keir Starmer performs a cabinet reshuffle, as MPs return to Westminster after the summer break. This includes Angela Rayner becoming both Shadow Levelling Up Secretary and Shadow Deputy Prime Minister.
  - Simon Byrne resigns as Chief Constable of the Police Service of Northern Ireland with immediate effect following a number of recent controversies.
  - The Met Office issues a heat health alert for much of the country, with temperatures forecast to reach as high as 32 °C later in the week.
  - BBC News reports that a record number of Asian hornets sightings could have devastating consequences for the UK's bee population for many years to come.
- 5 September
  - Birmingham City Council, the largest local authority in Europe, declares itself effectively bankrupt. The crisis, which prevents all but essential spending to protect core services, is linked to a £760m bill to settle equal pay claims, along with implementation of a new IT system.
  - As parts of the UK experience a heat wave, the UK Health Security Agency upgrades a yellow heat health alert to an amber warning in eight of the UK's nine regions amid forecasts that temperatures will reach 32 °C.
  - The UK government announces that nitrous oxide will be reclassified as a Class C drug and made illegal by the end of the year, with possession carrying a sentence of up to two years in prison.
  - Home Secretary Suella Braverman announces that Russia's mercenary Wagner Group is to be proscribed as a terrorist organisation.
- 6 September – A manhunt is launched for remand prisoner Daniel Abed Khalife following his escape from HMP Wandsworth.
- 7 September
  - The UK rejoins the EU's Horizon scientific research programme.
  - Justice Secretary Alex Chalk announces an independent inquiry into the escape of Daniel Khalife from Wandsworth Prison. The inquiry will have two areas of focus – a review of the "placement and categorisation" of all inmates at Wandsworth, and an investigation of all people in custody currently charged with terror offences.
  - The UK's first EV-only manufacturing plant begins production at Ellesmere Port, Cheshire.
  - The UK experiences a fourth day of temperatures exceeding 30 °C (86 °F), the highest consecutive number on record for the month of September, with hot weather expected to continue until the weekend.
- 8 September – The first anniversary of the death of Elizabeth II is marked by gun salutes at Hyde Park and the Tower of London, as well as the release of a short message from Charles III along with a previously unreleased portrait of the Queen taken in 1968.
- 9 September – Following a four-day manhunt, Daniel Khalife is arrested by the Metropolitan Police in Chiswick, London.
- 10 September
  - The Sunday Times reports that two men have been arrested under the Official Secrets Act, including a researcher in the UK Parliament accused of spying for China.
  - Mo Farah, considered one of the greatest British athletes of all time, takes part in the final race of his career at age 40, finishing fourth in the Great North Run.
  - The Metropolitan Police confirm that Daniel Khalife has been charged with escaping from Wandsworth Prison. He appears before Westminster Magistrates Court the following day, where he is remanded in custody until 29 September.
- 11 September
  - The GMB Union confirms that the UK's 400 Wilko stores will close by early October after a bid to rescue the retailer fell through.
  - Home Secretary Suella Braverman says she is seeking "urgent advice" on potentially banning the American Bully XL dog breed following an attack by a dog on an 11-year-old girl in Birmingham.
- 12 September
  - Pepco Group, owners of Poundland, announce they will take on the lease of 71 Wilko stores and convert them into Poundland outlets.
  - Government data reveals that average wages increased by 7.8% from May to July, matching the pace of inflation for the first time since 2021.
  - A joint study carried out by the University of Exeter, the University of Surrey and the Working Party on Sexual Misconduct in Surgery highlights the experiences of female surgeons, many of whom say they have faced sexual harassment, sexual assault or been raped by male colleagues.
  - Stonegate Group, the UK's largest pub chain, announces plans to introduce dynamic pricing during evenings and weekends at around 800 of its 4,000 outlets.
- 13 September
  - Data from the Office for National Statistics indicates the UK economy shrank by 0.5% during July, which is largely attributed to strike action and wet weather.
  - Data published by UK Finance shows payments by cash in the UK rose during 2022 for the first time in ten years, but were still lower than those by debit and credit card.
- 15 September
  - Following a recent spate of dog attacks, primarily involving the American XL bully, the government announces that the breed will be banned under the Dangerous Dogs Act by the end of the year.
  - Port Talbot Steelworks is allocated up to £500m by the UK government in a bid to keep the plant open and produce steel using greener methods.
  - Marks & Spencer becomes the latest high street retailer to announce it is scrapping plastic bags in favour of paper ones.
- 16 September
  - Comedian and actor Russell Brand is accused by four women of rape, sexual assaults, and emotional abuse between 2006 and 2013, following a joint investigation by the Sunday Times and Channel 4's Dispatches. Brand releases a video denying "serious criminal allegations".
  - Christine Middlemiss, the UK's Chief Veterinary Officer, says there will not be a cull of American bully XL dogs following Sunak's announcement that the breed is to be banned.
  - Solicitors representing convicted killer nurse Lucy Letby announce that she will be applying for permission to appeal against her convictions.
- 18 September
  - COVID-19 vaccination in the UK: New booster vaccines begin rolling out for people aged 65 and over in England, as a precaution against a highly mutated new COVID-19 variant called Pirola.
  - A new palm oil substitute called PALM-ALT is presented by researchers at Queen Margaret University in Scotland. The plant-based ingredient is shown to be 70% better for the environment than conventional palm oil and is described as "the holy grail to replace it."
  - Conservative MP Dehenna Davison resigns as a levelling up minister, saying "chronic migraines" have made it "impossible" to do her job.
  - Russell Brand's live tour is postponed, as police investigate a further allegation of sexual assault by the celebrity, dating back to 2003.
  - The UK government announces that Post Office workers who had wrongful convictions for false accounting and theft overturned will each be offered £600,000 in compensation.
- 19 September
  - The UK government announces that commissioners will be appointed to oversee the running of Birmingham City Council following its recent financial troubles.
  - The Scottish Government begins its legal challenge against Westminster over the UK government's decision to block the controversial Gender Recognition Reform (Scotland) Bill.
- 20 September
  - Data released by the Office for National Statistics show that inflation fell from 6.8% in July to 6.7% in August, something that is attributed to a fall in food prices.
  - Sunak announces a major rethink of the UK government's strategy to achieve net zero carbon output in the UK by 2050, including a delay in banning the sale of new petrol and diesel cars from 2030 to 2035.
- 21 September
  - The Bank of England holds interest rates at 5.25% after inflation for August was lower than expected.
  - Five Bulgarian nationals suspected of spying for Russia are to be charged with conspiracy to conduct espionage.
  - Charles III addresses the French Senate during his state visit to France.
  - News Corp chairman Rupert Murdoch announces his retirement and plan to hand over his businesses to his son Lachlan. Murdoch additionally owned the American broadcaster Fox and formerly Sky Group.
- 22 September
  - It is reported that eight-year-old Aditi Shankar has become the first child in the UK to receive a kidney transplant that will not require her to take medication to prevent the organ being rejected, and that she is healthy and has returned to school.
  - In his first statement since further allegations were made against him, Russell Brand posts a video on social media describing his week as "extraordinary and distressing".
- 23 September
  - The government's home energy efficiency taskforce is scrapped.
  - Members of the anti-monarchist pressure group Republic stage what they describe as the "first-ever" protest inside Buckingham Palace.
- 24 September – Home Secretary Suella Braverman orders a review into armed policing, after 300 firearms officers hand in their weapons, following concerns over a police officer charged with murdering 24-year-old Chris Kaba. Most of the officers return to their duties the following day.
- 25 September
  - A hearing at Manchester Crown Court determines that Lucy Letby will face a retrial for one of the six counts of attempted murder that the jury at her original trial was unable to reach a verdict on; a provisional trial date is set for 10 June 2024.
  - The Metropolitan Police are to investigate allegations of non-recent sexual offences following recent reports about comedian Russell Brand.
- 26 September
  - Home Secretary Suella Braverman tells a US think tank the 1951 Refugees Convention is no longer fit for the modern age, and that being discriminated against for being gay or female should not be enough to qualify for refugee status. The United Nations High Commission for Refugees rejects the comments.
  - Dr Mike McKean, vice-president for policy at the Royal College of Paediatrics and Child Health, says that public health messaging suggesting vaping is 95% safer than smoking is ineffective as a growing number of children are using e-cigarettes and experiencing health problems, and that messaging should have made it clearer that vaping should be for adults trying to give up smoking.
  - Five Bulgarian nationals accused of being part of a Russian spy ring appear in court in central London and are remanded in custody.
- 27 September
  - The Rosebank oil and gas field off Shetland, the UK's largest untapped oil field, is granted consent by regulators, amid widespread concerns over its contribution to climate change.
  - GB News suspends Laurence Fox as a presenter while it investigates comments he made on the channel about Ava Evans, a female journalist. Later in the day, Dan Wootton is suspended over the same incident.
  - The UK's first drugs consumption room gets the go-ahead in Glasgow, allowing heroin and cocaine addicts to use the substances under supervision.
  - A report by the Education Select Committee draws attention to the increased number of absences from schools in England, which has doubled since the COVID-19 pandemic; data for 2022–23 shows an average of 22.3% of school pupils were absent, compared to between 10% and 12% in the years prior to the pandemic. A combination of mental health issues and the cost of living crisis are attributed to the increase.
- 28 September
  - The 15-year-old girl killed in Croydon, South London the previous day is named locally as Elianne Andam. Police are given an extra 24 hours to question the 17-year-old suspect.
  - The landmark Sycamore Gap Tree, beside Hadrian's Wall in Northumberland, is illegally felled. A 16-year-old boy is subsequently arrested on suspicion of criminal damage.
- 29 September
  - A school bus carrying 58 people overturns between junction 4 and 5 of the M53 motorway, killing a 15-year-old girl and the driver. A major incident is declared by North West Ambulance Service and Liverpool's Alder Hey Children's Hospital. Dozens of others are treated for injuries, and several are hospitalised.
  - A 17-year-old boy appears in court charged with the murder of Elianne Andam, and is remanded in youth detention to appear before the Old Bailey on 3 October.
  - A second person – a man in his 60s – is arrested in correction with the cutting-down of the world-famous Sycamore Gap Tree. The 16-year-old boy arrested over the incident the previous day is released on bail.
  - In an interview with The Sun, Prime Minister Rishi Sunak reinforces his pro-motorist stance, saying he wants to stop "hare-brained" road calming and safety schemes – including 20 mph zones and low-traffic neighbourhoods – putting an end to what he refers to as a "war on motorists".

=== October ===
- 2 October
  - Russell Brand faces a second police investigation, as Thames Valley Police announce they are looking into claims of harassment and stalking by the comedian.
  - The price of a first class stamp rises from £1.10 to £1.25, the third increase in 18 months.
  - Chancellor Jeremy Hunt confirms the National Minimum Wage will rise to £11 an hour from April 2024.
  - The Met Office confirms that September 2023 was the joint warmest September on record for the UK, tying with 2006 with an average temperature of 15.2 °C.
- 3 October – Home Secretary Suella Braverman addresses the Conservative Party Conference and says a "hurricane" of migrants is coming to the UK.
- 4 October
  - Rishi Sunak confirms that the West Midlands to Manchester portion of the High Speed 2 (HS2) rail link will be axed, which will free up £36bn to be spent on new transport projects in the North and Midlands. He also confirms that the southern portion of the line will run all the way from Birmingham to Euston, not just Old Oak Common as earlier reports had speculated.
  - Sunak proposes that the age at which people can buy cigarettes and tobacco should rise by one year every year, so that eventually no-one can buy them, emulating a similar scheme announced recently in New Zealand.
  - Sunak confirms plans to replace A Levels and T Levels in England with a new qualification called the Advanced British Standard.
  - Laurence Fox is arrested "on suspicion of conspiring to commit criminal damage to ULEZ cameras and encouraging or assisting offences to be committed." He is subsequently fired from GB News, along with fellow presenter Calvin Robinson.
  - Cheshire Police confirm they have launched an investigation into possible corporate manslaughter at the Countess of Chester Hospital, where killer nurse Lucy Letby was employed.
- 5 October
  - Jaswant Singh Chail, 21, becomes the first person in the UK to be convicted of treason since 1981, after taking a crossbow to Windsor Castle and intending to kill Queen Elizabeth II.
  - The Metropolitan Police announce that 21 people arrested during the King's Coronation will face no further charges.
  - 2023 Cricket World Cup in India, England competes in the 2023 Cricket World Cup.
- 5–6 October – 2023 Rutherglen and Hamilton West by-election: Labour's Michael Shanks wins, resoundingly defeating the incumbent SNP by a swing of over 20%.
- 7 October – The Criminal Cases Review Commission is to review the conviction of Michael Stone for the 1996 murders of Lin and Megan Russell after serial killer Levi Bellfield is reported to have confessed to the murders.

October 2023: The UK joins the international response to the Gaza war.

- 8 October
  - Police patrols in London are increased after videos emerge of what appears to be people celebrating a series of attacks launched by Hamas against Israel.
  - Nathanel Young, a 20-year-old British man serving in the Israeli army, is killed in an attack by Hamas militants.
  - The Israeli Embassy in London confirms that British-born Jake Marlowe, who was working in Israel as a security guard, is missing following the previous day's attacks.
  - The final Wilko stores close in the UK.
- 9 October
  - Sunak chairs an emergency COBRA meeting to discuss the escalating situation in Israel, and pledges further support for the country.
  - The number of dead or missing Britons caught up in the Israel-Gaza attacks rises to more than 10; Nathanel Young and Bernard Cowan are the only two confirmed to have been killed.
  - Addressing the congregation of a London synagogue, Sunak says that Britain stands with Israel, and that he will "stop at nothing" to keep Britain's Jewish community safe.
  - Humza Yousaf, the First Minister of Scotland, condemns the attacks and expresses concern for his in-laws, who are "trapped" in Gaza after travelling there to visit relatives.
- 10 October
  - In his speech to the Labour Party Conference, Sir Keir Starmer promises NHS reform, more police officers on streets, and 1.5 million new homes. The beginning of the speech is disrupted by a heckler on stage who throws black glitter over Starmer.
  - After making contact with his parents-in-law in Gaza, Humza Yousaf calls for a humanitarian corridor to be established.
  - The UK and Ireland are confirmed as joint hosts of Euro 2028.
  - Research carried out by Kantar indicates that September's warm weather delayed the purchase of Christmas food items such as seasonal biscuits and puddings.
  - The International Monetary Fund forecasts the UK will have the highest inflation and slowest economic growth of any G7 economy during 2024, something the UK government describes as "too gloomy".
  - All flights from Luton Airport are halted while emergency services deal with a large fire at Terminal Car Park 2.
- 11 October
  - An official source tells BBC News that 17 Britons, including children, are feared dead or are missing in Israel following the Hamas attacks.
  - A statement issued by Buckingham Palace says that King Charles III is "appalled" and condemns the "barbaric acts of terrorism in Israel" and that the King's "thoughts and prayers are with all of those suffering, particularly those who have lost loved ones, but also those actively involved as we speak".
  - British Airways and Virgin Atlantic suspend all flights to and from Israel amid safety concerns, with British Airways turning back one of its flights shortly before it was scheduled to land at Tel Aviv Airport.
- 12 October
  - Data from the Office for National Statistics indicates the UK economy grew by 0.2% in August after shrinking in July.
  - Bernie Ecclestone pleads guilty to fraud after failing to declare more than £400m of overseas assets.
  - The SNP's Lisa Cameron defects to the Conservatives, citing a "toxic" culture in her former party.
  - The Foreign Office announces that the UK will arrange flights to help get stranded British nationals out of Israel.
  - The recommended safe daily dose of cannabidiol (CBD) is lowered by the Food Standards Agency, following concerns that long-term use might cause liver and other health problems.
  - Downing Street announces that the UK will send surveillance aircraft and two Royal Navy ships to the eastern Mediterranean to support Israel.
  - The Royal Mint unveils a new set of coins bearing the portrait of Charles III which will go into circulation at the end of the year.
- 13 October
  - The Competition and Markets Authority approves Microsoft's £59bn takeover of Call of Duty-maker Activision Blizzard, the largest ever deal in video game history.
  - The United Kingdom begins evacuating British citizens from Israel.
  - The Metropolitan Police reports a "massive increase" in the number of antisemitic incidents in London between 30 September and 13 October, with 105 incidents and 75 offences, compared to 14 incidents and 12 offences during the same period of 2022. Sunak describes the increase as "disgusting".
- 14 October
  - Michael Caine announces his retirement from acting at the age of 90, following the recent launch of his final film, The Great Escaper.
  - Pro-Palestinian protests take place in cities across the UK, including London and Manchester, with police warning that anyone showing support for Hamas faces arrest.
  - Red paint is sprayed over the BBC headquarters in central London. A pro-Palestinian group claims responsibility, citing the broadcaster's coverage of the Israel-Hamas war, but the Metropolitan police denies the incident is linked to a protest group and says no arrests have been made.
  - Oxford's Joint European Torus nuclear fusion laboratory conducts its final experiments after 40 years in operation.
- 15 October
  - First Minister of Scotland Humza Yousaf signals a change in his party's Scottish independence strategy, now saying that an SNP win in a majority of Scotland's Westminster seats would give the party a mandate to begin independence negotiations with the Westminster Government.
  - One person is killed and another is wounded in a stabbing attack in Hartlepool. The attack is being investigated by Counter Terrorism Policing. A suspect has been detained.
- Illustration of Storm Babet by the US government
  16–22 October – Storm Babet hits the UK, bringing disruption to much of the country. Red weather warnings are issued by the Met Office, as three deaths are reported, and power shortages affect tens of thousands in Scotland. The crew of a Danish fishing trawler are rescued by the RNLI in the North Sea.
- 16 October
  - Prime Minister Rishi Sunak confirms that six British citizens were killed during the Hamas attacks on Israel, while a further ten are missing.
  - Two British teenage sisters, Noya and Yahel Sharabi, are among those missing, and believed to have been kidnapped, following the 7 October attacks on Israel. Their mother, Lianne, also a British citizen, was killed in the Be'eri massacre. The following day the girls' family tells the BBC the Yahel was also murdered. On 22 October the family release a statement to say Noya was also murdered.
  - Guardian cartoonist Steve Bell is sacked following a row over a drawing he created of Israeli prime minister Benjamin Netanyahu that was deemed to be antisemitic.
  - Justice Secretary Alex Chalk announces that prisons in England and Wales will be allowed to release some minor offenders on probation early in order to alleviate overcrowding.
- 17 October
  - Data from the Office for National Statistics indicates average wages increased by 7.8% in the three months July 2023, and consequently outpaced inflation for the first time since October 2021.
  - Wales becomes the first country in the UK to ban the use of snares and glue boards for catching rats.
- 18 October
  - Amazon announce plans to begin using drones to deliver packages in the UK by the end of 2024.
  - The High Court releases its ruling over the Carla Foster case, stating that sentencing women to prison for abortion related crimes is "unlikely" to be a "just outcome".
- 19 October
  - Prime Minister Rishi Sunak begins a two-day visit to Israel as part of diplomatic efforts to help prevent the Israel–Hamas war escalating into a wider Middle East conflict. Following a meeting with Israeli prime minister Benjamin Netanyahu, Sunak says he will stand with Israel "in solidarity".
  - British-Israeli Yonatan Rapoport is named as one of the people killed during the 7 October attack on Israel.
  - Migrants are returned to the Bibby Stockholm accommodation barge in Portland, Dorset, amid protests at the port gates.
  - Members of the National Union of Rail, Maritime and Transport Workers (RMT) vote to stage a further six months of strike action.
- 20 October
  - 2023 Mid Bedfordshire by-election: Labour MP Alistair Strathern wins the constituency of Mid Bedfordshire, with the Conservatives' share of the vote falling by 28.7%, one of the largest swings of the post-war era.
  - 2023 Tamworth by-election: Labour MP Sarah Edwards wins the constituency of Tamworth, with the Conservatives' share of the vote falling by 25.6%.
  - Sunak meets Palestinian Authority leader Mahmoud Abbas in Egypt, where they jointly condemn Hamas's attacks on Israel. Sunak also "expressed his deep condolences" for civilian deaths in Gaza.
  - Data from the Office for National Statistics shows UK government borrowing was at £14.3bn in September 2023, lower than the £18.3bn that had been forecast by economists.
  - Moody's drops its negative credit rating for the UK, saying that "policy predictability has been restored" following the September 2022 mini-budget.
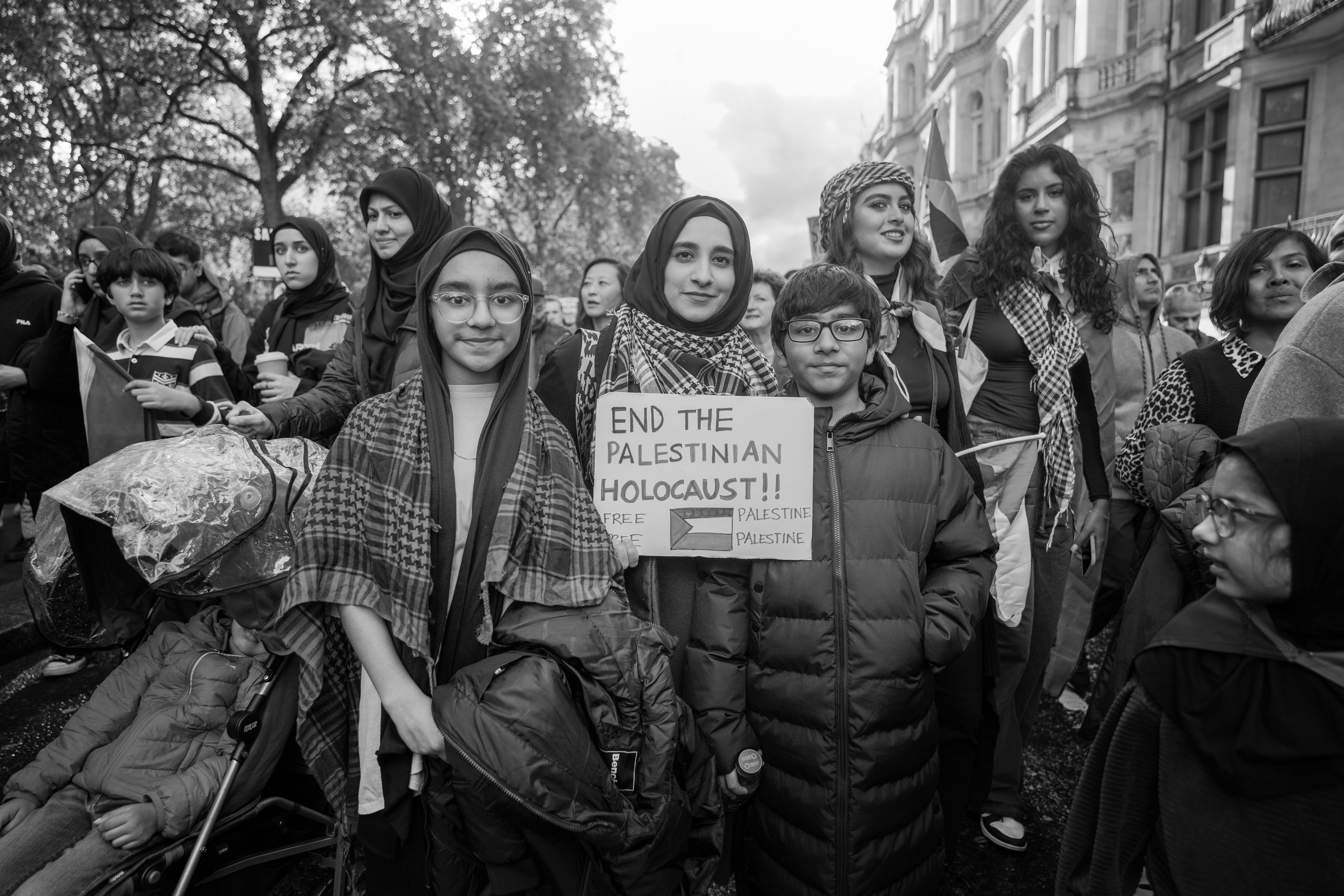
- Participants in a pro-Palestinian march in London
  21 October
  - A report prepared by the Royal College of Psychiatrists suggests more support is needed to prevent children under the age of five from going on to develop mental health problems in later life.
  - A pro-Palestinian protest is held in London. Although the main event passes without incident, video subsequently emerges of a man chanting "jihad" at a separate rally, but the Metropolitan Police say no offence has been committed after reviewing the film. Following a discussion on the matter with the home secretary, Metropolitan Police chief Sir Mark Rowley says hate crime laws "probably need redrawing".
  - 2023 Rugby World Cup: England are defeated by South Africa in the Rugby World Cup semi-final.
- 23 October
  - A significant breakthrough in treating cervical cancer is reported by University College London, with participants in a Phase III trial seeing a 35% reduction in the risk of both mortality or the disease returning. The study used a combination of existing, cheap drugs ahead of usual radiotherapy treatment.
  - The Royal Mint unveil a special Christmas 50 pence coin, celebrating the 1978 picture book The Snowman by Raymond Briggs.
  - British-Israeli Yosef Guedalia is named as another victim killed by Hamas in the 7 October attack.
  - Sunak tells parliament the UK has judged the al-Ahli Arab Hospital explosion, which occurred on 17 October, was likely caused by "a missile, or part of one" fired from "within Gaza".
  - COVID-19 in the UK: Hospitals ask visitors to wear face-coverings amidst a rise in COVID-19 cases.
- 24 October
  - Office for National Statistics data shows that UK unemployment remained at 4.2% in the three months up to August 2023.
  - A BBC investigation finds that UK authorities failed to act on multiple official warnings about an online forum promoting suicide connected to at least 50 UK deaths.
  - Immigration Minister Robert Jenrick confirms that the UK government will stop using 50 hotels to accommodate asylum seekers by January 2024. Local officials subsequently warn that local authorities may be forced to pay for use of the hotels instead.
  - The Financial Conduct Authority confirms that the cap on bankers' bonuses, introduced in 2014, will be lifted from 31 October as part of post-Brexit financial reforms.
  - 2023 North Sea incident: Two cargo ships, the British-flagged Verity and the Bahamas-flagged Polesie, collide in the North Sea near the Heligoland islands, with several individuals missing and the suspected sinking of the Verity.
- 25 October
  - Lloyds Banking Group releases forecasts for UK house prices, predicting they will shrink by 4.7% in 2023 and 2.4% in 2024, before beginning to rise again in 2025.
  - Sunak tells Parliament he supports "specific pauses" in the Israel–Hamas conflict to allow the delivery of aid and get British citizens out of the area.
  - Lewis Edwards, a former officer with South Wales Police who groomed 210 underage girls using social media and blackmailed them into sending him indecent photographs, is sentenced to life imprisonment with a minimum term of 12 years.
  - Three members of the Just Stop Oil protest group are arrested on suspicion of criminal damage after spraying the Wellington Arch in central London with orange paint.
  - A police misconduct hearing finds that two Metropolitan Police officers who stopped and searched athletes Bianca Williams and Ricardo Dos Santos in west London committed gross misconduct, and the officers are dismissed.
- 26 October – Sunak gives a speech warning of the dangers of artificial intelligence.
- 27 October
  - Labour Mayor of London Sadiq Khan, Mayor of Greater Manchester Andy Burnham, and Scottish Labour leader Anas Sarwar break with the stance of Labour's leader, Sir Keir Starmer, on the Israel–Hamas conflict by calling for a ceasefire in Gaza.
  - The new owner of the Wilko brand announces that up to five shops will open under the Wilko name before Christmas.
  - GB News hires former prime minister Boris Johnson to present a series "showcasing the power of Britain around the world"; he will also help to provide coverage of the next UK and US elections.
  - Data released to BBC News indicates there are around 3,500 dogs belonging to banned species living legally at residences in the UK mainland under an exemption scheme.
- 28 October – £10 million worth of cocaine is found in a Panamanian-registered container ship carrying bananas to the Netherlands at the Port of Sheerness.
- 30 October
  - The UK government grants 27 new oil and gas licences for projects in the North Sea that will allow potential resources to be explored and developed.
  - Mark Drakeford, First Minister of Wales and leader of Welsh Labour, echoes Labour leader Sir Keir Starmer's call for a humanitarian pause in the Gaza conflict to allow aid in to the region. His comments come after 12 of his backbenchers in the Senedd signed a petition calling for a ceasefire.
  - Joshua Bowles, a former GCHQ employee from Cheltenham, who stabbed a woman from the US in a March 2023 attack at a leisure centre car park in the town, is sentenced to life imprisonment with a minimum of 13 years after pleading guilty to attempted murder at an Old Bailey hearing.
  - The Met Office issues a warning for heavy rain and floods for parts of the UK ahead of the arrival of Storm Ciarán.
  - A ban on the sale of some single use plastic items, such as cutlery, plates and drinking straws, comes into force in Wales.
- 31 October
  - Plans to close hundreds of rail ticket offices in England are scrapped. Secretary of State for Transport Mark Harper says the government "has asked train operators to withdraw their proposals" because they "failed to meet high passenger standards". This follows a public consultation into the cost-cutting proposals, which attracted 750,000 responses, in which 99% were objections.
  - Lee Cain, the former Downing Street Director of Communications, gives evidence at the second phase of the COVID-19 public inquiry. He states: "I don't think there was any clarity of purpose, any really serious outlined plan to deal with Covid at that particular point and I think that was the core failure," and says the pandemic was the "wrong crisis" for Boris Johnson's "skill set".
  - The UK government confirms that American XL Bully dogs have been added to the banned list under the Dangerous Dogs Act 1991, and that from 1 February 2024 it will become illegal to own one in England and Wales unless the owner has successfully applied for the dog to be exempt.

=== November ===
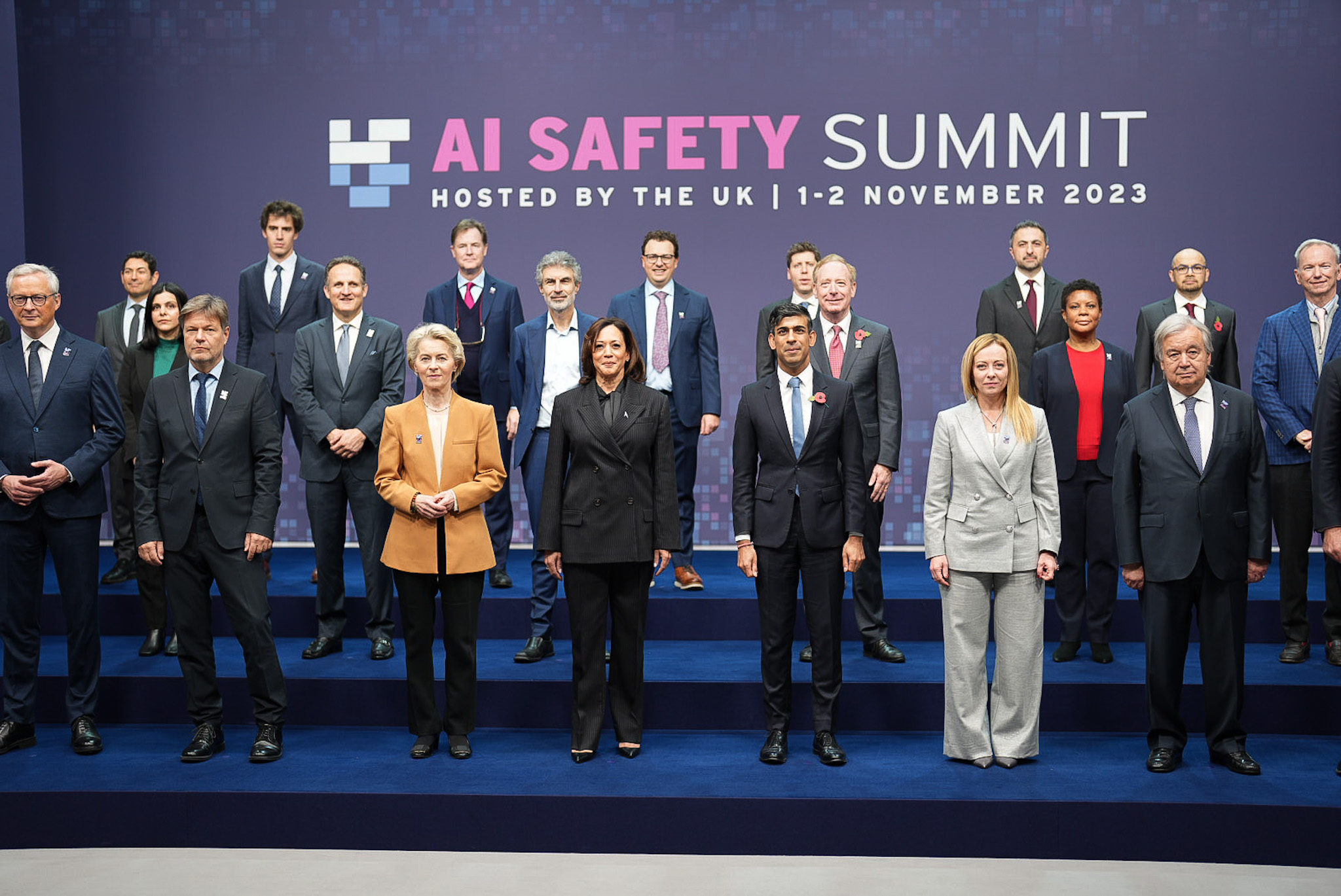
1 and 2 November 2023: amid an ongoing boom in artificial intelligence, the UK hosts the world's first international summit devoted to safely managing the technology.

- 1 November
  - The Foreign Office reports that the departure of British nationals from Gaza will likely take place "in stages over the coming days." The BBC reports that 200 are believed to be in the region.
  - The 2023 AI Safety Summit takes place at Bletchley Park. The UK government announces a "world first agreement" between 28 countries on how to manage the riskiest forms of AI.
  - Gail Bradbrook, a co-founder of Extinction Rebellion, is convicted of causing £27,000 of damage to the Department for Transport at a demonstration in 2019.
  - Figures published by Nationwide Building Society indicate a 0.9% rise in house prices in October, the largest for a year, which Nationwide says was likely due to demand being greater than availability of properties for sale.
  - The 2024 British Soap Awards are cancelled for an undisclosed reason.
  - Storm Ciarán hits Great Britain, bringing winds of up to 100 mph and widespread disruption.
- 2 November
  - The Bank of England keeps interest rates unchanged at 5.25% for a second consecutive month.
  - The Beatles release "Now and Then", likely the band's last ever song, featuring restored vocals by John Lennon (1940–1980), as well as guitar tracks by George Harrison (1943–2001), based on a home demo recorded by Lennon in the late 1970s.
  - The sale of tickets for the 2024 Glastonbury Festival is delayed for two weeks "out of fairness" to customers who did not realise their registration had expired.
- 3 November
  - Jordan McSweeney, the killer of Zara Aleena, wins a Court of Appeal challenge to have his minimum sentence of 38 years reduced to a minimum of 33 years.
  - Conservative MP Bob Stewart is found guilty of a racially aggravated public order offence after telling an activist to "go back to Bahrain".
  - BBC News reports that Matthew White, the sixth suspect in the murder of Stephen Lawrence, allegedly confessed to involvement in the killing when he tried to stab a security guard while shoplifting from a supermarket in 2015.
  - Sunak warns that protests planned for Armistice Day on 11 November would be "provocative and disrespectful".
- 4 November
  - A further allegation of sexual assault is made against Russell Brand, dating from 2010.
  - Home Secretary Suella Braverman announces a plan to deter "those who cause nuisance ... by pitching tents in public spaces" by making it harder for homeless people to access tents, describing it as a "lifestyle choice".
  - Around 100 people are injured after a cruise ship, the Spirit of Discovery, owned by Saga Cruises, is caught in a storm in the Bay of Biscay.
- 6 November
  - Following a trial at Birmingham Crown Court, Mohammed Abbkr is convicted of attempted murder after he set two elderly worshippers alight after they left mosques in London and Birmingham.
  - The Metropolitan Police urges the organisers of pro-Palestinian marches to delay events planned for Armistice Day.
- 7 November
  - Charles III attends the 2023 State Opening of Parliament, his first as King.
  - Anastrozole, a drug used for a number of years to treat breast cancer, is licensed for use in England as a preventative option.
  - Prince William announces the five winners of the annual Earthshot Prize.
  - Bradford East MP Imran Hussain resigns as Shadow Minister for the New Deal for Working People from the opposition frontbench citing Keir Starmer's response to the Gaza war.
- 8 November
  - Possession of nitrous oxide, commonly known as "laughing gas" or "NOS", is categorised as a Class C drug, making its possession illegal in the UK.
  - Sunak says he will hold the Commissioner of the Metropolitan Police "accountable" over a pro-Palestinian march planned for Armistice Day, and meets with Sir Mark Rowley to discuss the demonstration.
  - Members of the National Union of Rail, Maritime and Transport Workers are to vote on a revised pay offer and guarantee of job security that could end the railway strikes.
  - The Mounjaro injection for treating obesity is approved for use in the UK by the Medicines and Healthcare products Regulatory Agency.
- 9 November
  - Home Secretary Suella Braverman faces questions about her future after writing an article for The Times questioning the impartiality of the police over the way they deal with demonstrations, claiming that aggressive right-wing protesters are "rightly met with a stern response", while "pro-Palestinian mobs" are "largely ignored". The article was not cleared by Downing Street, while she ignored suggested changes to the piece made by officials.
  - Data from NHS England shows waiting lists in England reached a record high in September 2023, with 7.77 million people waiting for treatment in England, including over a million on more than one waiting list.
  - The Rosalind Franklin Covid Laboratory in Leamington Spa, the UK's first COVID-19 testing mega lab which opened in June 2021, is put up for sale by the UK government.
- 10 November
  - Data from the Office for National Statistics shows the UK economy did not grow between July and September 2023. Chancellor Jeremy Hunt blames high interest rates for the situation, but says that overall the economy has performed better than expected during 2023.
  - Downing Street says that Rishi Sunak still has "full confidence" in Home Secretary Suella Braverman, while Chancellor Jeremy Hunt says her comments "are not words that I myself would have used".
  - The High Court rules that Prince Harry and six others can go ahead with a case against Associated Newspapers Ltd for unlawfully obtaining information about them. Associated Newspapers had wanted to stop the case arguing the time on the claims had expired.
  - The Metropolitan Police imposes an exclusion zone around the Cenotaph ahead of planned demonstrations over Remembrance Weekend.
- 11 November
  - A pro-Palestinian march through central London goes ahead as planned, attended by an estimated 300,000 people, who walk from Park Lane down to the U.S. Embassy in Nine Elms. Police arrest more than 100 counter-protesters.
  - Deepfake audio of London Mayor Sadiq Khan calling for Armistice Day to be rescheduled for the march is reportedly circulated by a far-right group. The Met Police says it "does not constitute a criminal offence".
- 12 November
  - The Metropolitan Police condemns "extreme violence from right-wing protesters" during the previous day's demonstrations in London. Seven people are charged with disorder-related offences.
  - The Met Office issues a yellow weather warning for wind and rain ahead of the arrival of Storm Debi which will affect parts of northern England and Wales.
- 13 November
  - Cabinet reshuffle: Suella Braverman is sacked as home secretary and replaced by James Cleverly. In a surprise move, the former PM David Cameron is appointed as foreign secretary. Thérèse Coffey resigns as environment secretary and is succeeded by Steve Barclay. Richard Holden is made the Conservative party chair, replacing Greg Hands; Victoria Atkins is promoted to health secretary; Laura Trott becomes chief secretary to the Treasury.
  - Following a trial at the Old Bailey, Aine Davis, who spent two years with Islamic State, is sentenced to eight years in prison for possessing a weapon for terrorism purposes and attempting to fundraise for terrorism purposes.
  - Shawn Seesahai, a 19-year-old from Anguilla, is stabbed to death in Wolverhampton. Two boys, aged 12 at the time, are convicted the following year as the UK's youngest knife crime murderers and the youngest overall since the murder of James Bulger.
- 14 November
  - Two more people come forward with allegations against Russell Brand during his time at the BBC.
  - Seven members of a paedophile gang are found guilty of running a child sex abuse ring in Glasgow, described by the NSPCC as one of the worst cases of its kind in decades.
  - Gaza war: David Cameron, the new foreign secretary, announces sanctions against four senior Hamas leaders and two of the militant group's financiers.
  - Chelsea Ladies Football Club manager Emma Hayes is named as the new manager of the United States women's national football team, and will take up the role in May 2024.
- 15 November
  - Inflation falls to 4.6%, the lowest rate since November 2021, driven mainly by lower energy prices.
  - The British Government's plan to deport migrants to Rwanda is ruled as unlawful by the Supreme Court.
  - Sunak says the government will introduce "emergency legislation" to enable Parliament to "confirm Rwanda is safe" and prevent legal challenges from blocking the migrant policy.
  - More than 50 Labour MPs defy Sir Keir Starmer to vote for an immediate ceasefire in the Israel-Hamas war.
  - The General Synod of the Church of England votes to allow special church services of blessing for gay couples.
- 16 November
  - David Cameron makes his first working visit to Ukraine as foreign secretary, where he meets President Volodymyr Zelenskyy in Kyiv, and reiterates the UK's promise to provide moral, diplomatic and "above all military support for... however long it takes".
  - Train drivers union ASLEF announces new strike dates, with a rolling programme of strikes from 2 to 8 December affecting different train companies on different days.
  - A sixth person is confirmed dead following a house fire in Hounslow, West London.
  - Casgevy, a world-first gene therapy that aims to cure sickle-cell disease and transfusion-dependent beta thalassemia, is approved by the Medicines and Healthcare products Regulatory Agency, becoming the first drug using CRISPR to be licensed.
- 17 November
  - Education Secretary Gillian Keegan says she is "deeply concerned" about children missing school to attend pro-Palestinian protests, after a number of school age children were seen at protests around the UK.
  - After being found in breach of the Premier League's financial rules, Everton Football Club have 10 points deducted, leaving them 19th in the league's table. It is the biggest punishment in the Premier League's history.
  - A study published by the Health Foundation finds that 12% of the UK's workforce has a work limiting health condition, a figure roughly equating to around 3.7m, and up from 8.5% a decade ago. These conditions are particular prevalent in the young.
- 19 November – Shadow Chancellor Rachel Reeves describes protests targeting MPs over the Gaza conflict as "crossing the line" after a demonstration was held near the offices of Labour leader Sir Keir Starmer the previous day.
- 20 November – The latest stage of the COVID-19 Inquiry hears from Sir Patrick Vallance, Chief Scientific Adviser during the pandemic. He recalls that Boris Johnson struggled with scientific concepts, and that after a five-hour meeting with him, after the Prime Minister had returned from a "Battle of Britain memorial service and was distressed by seeing everyone separated and in masks", he "looked broken – his head in hands a lot." He quotes the PM saying "We are too shit to get our act together". He also recalls that Chief Medical Officer Chris Whitty had concerns about the "indirect harms" of lockdown.
- 21 November
  - Four bodies are found by North Wales Police in the search for teenage boys missing for two days, after their car appeared to have left the road near Tremadog. A coroner's inquest later finds they drowned, after the vehicle overturned and became partially submerged in water.
  - Chancellor Jeremy Hunt announces an increase in the National Living Wage to £11.44 from April 2024; with the increase also encompassing those aged 21 and 22 for the first time.
- 22 November
  - Lady Justice Thirlwall formally opens the public inquiry into the activities of serial killer Lucy Letby.
  - Jeremy Hunt delivers the November 2023 United Kingdom autumn statement.
- 23 November
  - More than 50 firefighters tackle a major blaze at the Station Hill development in Reading. One person is lifted by crane from the roof of a building, and two people are treated in hospital for smoke inhalation.
  - Office for National Statistics data suggests that in 2022, net migration—the difference between the number of people arriving in the UK and leaving the UK—was 745,000, something the UK government describes as too high.
  - Ofgem confirms that household energy prices will rise by 5% from January 2024.
  - Lawrence Jones, founder of tech company UKFast Limited, is convicted of drugging and raping women in the early 1990s while he worked as a hotel pianist.
- 25 November
  - A 200-metre stretch of road collapses onto a beach at Hemsby, Norfolk, due to coastal erosion, causing significant damage and disruption to the area. No casualties are reported.
  - Another cliff collapse is reported further south, at Pakefield Holiday Park in Lowestoft, Suffolk. The public is urged to avoid the area, as local residents are evacuated.
- 26 November
  - An estimated 100,000 people, including former prime minister Boris Johnson, attend a march against antisemitism in central London.
  - Prophet Song, a dystopian novel set in Ireland and written by Paul Lynch, wins the 2023 Booker Prize.
- 27 November
  - Health officials are investigating the first confirmed human case of the A(H1N2)v swine flu virus in the UK.
  - Sunak cancels a planned meeting with Greek Prime Minister Kyriakos Mitsotakis after a diplomatic row breaks out between the UK and Greece over the Elgin Marbles. Downing Street subsequently says that the meeting was cancelled after Mitsotakis broke an agreement not to discuss the Marbles in public when he told BBC One's Sunday with Laura Kuenssberg he would like them to be returned.
  - Police are investigating after Mirza Shahzad Akbar, a former adviser to imprisoned Pakistani prime minister Imran Khan, was attacked with acid outside his home in the UK.
  - English Defence League founder Tommy Robinson is charged by police with failing to comply with an order to stay away from the previous day's antisemitism march after attending the rally.
- 28 November
  - An investigation by The Guardian finds that potentially toxic "forever chemicals" are present in the drinking water sources at 17 of the 18 water companies in England.
  - Virgin Atlantic launches the world's first transatlantic flight by a large passenger plane using 100% sustainable aviation fuel. The passengerless journey is made by a Boeing 787 travelling from London Heathrow to New York.
- 29 November
  - The coldest November night since 2010 is experienced by many parts of the UK, reaching as low as −8 °C (18 °F) in Aonach Mòr in the Scottish Highlands, with snow and ice warnings for various regions extending to Friday.
  - Natural England announces that England will be getting a new National Park. The Chilterns, The Cotswolds and Dorset could become new National Parks.
  - Nottingham City Council declares itself effectively bankrupt, with a £23m overspend forecast for the 2023–24 financial year.
  - At Prime Minister's Questions, Sunak accuses the Greek prime minister of trying to "grandstand" over the Elgin Marbles when questioned about his decision to cancel a planned meeting with Mitsotakis.
- 30 November
  - Matt Hancock, who served as health secretary from 2018 to 2021, appears at the latest stage of the COVID-19 inquiry.
  - RMT members vote to accept a pay deal from 14 train companies, which ends a long-running series of strikes until at least spring 2024.
  - The UK government is to examine the potential purchase of The Daily Telegraph by a consortium backed by Sheikh Mansour bin Zayed Al Nahyan.
  - The coldest night in the UK since mid-March is recorded, with temperatures dipping to as low as −9.4 °C (15.1 °F) in Cumbria. Weather warnings remain in place for many regions.

=== December ===
- 1 December
  - Entrepreneur Sir James Dyson loses a High Court libel case against Mirror Group Newspapers over a January 2022 Daily Mirror article written by journalist Brian Reade.
  - UKFast founder Lawrence Jones is sentenced to 15 years in prison for two rapes and a sexual assault.
  - Tens of thousands of Three customers report they are unable to get a signal.
- 2 December
  - The Met Office issues additional weather warnings, as freezing temperatures continue to affect large areas of the UK.
  - The Ministry of Defence confirms that a 32-year-old British soldier, named as Major Kevin McCool, has been killed while off duty in Kenya.
- 3 December – Temperatures drop even further, to as low as −12 °C (10.4 °F) in Scotland. A major incident is declared in Cumbria after heavy snowfall, with drivers stuck in traffic, one after a 19-hour journey, without food or water.
- 4 December
  - Home Secretary James Cleverly unveils the UK government's five-point plan aimed at reducing legal migration, which includes increasing the minimum salary threshold for a visa from £26,200 to £38,700, and reducing the number of dependants social care workers can bring.
  - MPs vote 246–242 in favour of an amendment to the Victims and Prisoners Bill requiring the UK government to accelerate plans to establish a body to compensate victims of the NHS infected blood scandal, defeating the government which had not planned to include the measure in the legislation.
- 5 December
  - Junior doctors in England will stage further strike action after rejecting the latest pay offer, the British Medical Association confirms, with a three-day strike scheduled to begin on 20 December and a six-day strike scheduled to begin on 3 January 2024.
  - The Scottish Prison Service issues new guidelines on transgender prisoners. Trans women who have hurt or threatened women or girls will not be sent to a female prison unless there are "exceptional" circumstances.
  - Jesse Darling is announced as the winner of the 2023 Turner Prize.
- 6 December
  - Boris Johnson, who served as prime minister from 2019 to 2022, appears before the COVID-19 inquiry and is questioned by Hugo Keith, counsel to the inquiry. He apologises for the "pain and the loss and the suffering" people experienced during the pandemic. His comments are interrupted by protesters, who are ordered to leave the inquiry room.
  - Robert Jenrick resigns as immigration minister after the government publishes an emergency Rwanda bill.
- 7 December
  - Figures released by Halifax Bank indicate house prices in the UK rose by 0.5% in November 2023.
  - Culture Secretary Lucy Frazer confirms the TV licence fee will increase by £10.50 from £159 to £169.50 from 1 April 2024.
  - Serial killer Steve Wright is arrested for the September 1999 murder of Victoria Hall.
- 8 December
  - A letter to MPs from Sir Matthew Rycroft, the Permanent Under-Secretary of State of the Home Office, says that £240m has been paid so far to Rwanda for the Rwanda asylum plan, with a further £50m to be paid in 2024.
  - Data from the Moneyfacts Group suggests the average rate on a two-year fixed-term mortgage has fallen below 6% for the first time since June 2023.
  - The Court of Session in Edinburgh rules that the UK government acted lawfully by blocking the Gender Recognition Reform (Scotland) Bill from becoming law, and rejects the Scottish Government's appeal against the decision.
  - At the Old Bailey, Paul Bryan is sentenced to life imprisonment with a minimum of 24 years for the 1984 murder of Roman Szalajko at the victim's south London home. Bryan assumed the identity of a dead man with the same name, but was traced through a fingerprint match in 2022.
  - After footballer Joey Barton suggests that women "should not be talking with any kind of authority" about men's football, Chelsea manager Emma Hayes says women are "routinely used to dealing with systemic misogyny and bullying" in football.
  - Wham!'s Last Christmas tops the singles chart for the fourth time with Mariah Carey's All I Want For Christmas Is You taking the second spot. A week after the death of Shane MacGowan from The Pogues, Fairytale of New York rises to number four.
- 9 December
  - Yellow weather warnings are in place for much of the UK as two successive storms, Elin and Fergus, reach the UK from the Atlantic, bringing high winds and heavy rain.
  - The royal family reveal their Christmas card images with King Charles III choosing a photograph from his coronation earlier this year for his second Christmas as monarch. Meanwhile, the Prince and Princess of Wales release a monochrome photograph of them and their children: Prince George of Wales, Princess Charlotte of Wales, and Prince Louis of Wales.
- 10 December
  - Lawyers on the right of the Conservative Party describe the new Rwanda legislation as not "sufficiently watertight".
  - In his first broadcast since leaving the post of Immigration Minister, Robert Jenrick tells the BBC Sunak's draft Rwanda law unlikely to work since it is "weak" and will become "bogged down" in legal challenges.
  - The skull of a pliosaur is discovered off the coast of Dorset. The 2 m (6 ft 7 in) fossil is said to have roamed the waters 150 million years ago. A David Attenborough documentary is scheduled to air on BBC One on New Year's Day revealing the "risky mission" of unearthing the "T-Rex of the seas".
- 11 December
  - The National Crime Agency (NCA) suggests that street drugs stronger than heroin are linked to the deaths of at least 54 people in the past six months, with 40 more cases awaiting further testing.
  - The UK government is offering a £2.5bn financial package for the return of a Stormont Executive, which includes funds to settle public sector disputes and for public services.
- 12 December
  - The UK government's Safety of Rwanda (Asylum and Immigration) Bill, a piece of emergency legislation to support the Rwanda asylum plan, passes with a majority of 44 as MPs vote 313–269 in favour of it.
  - Dorset Police are investigating following the death of an asylum seeker, thought to have taken his own life, on the accommodation barge Bibby Stockholm.
- 13 December
  - Mark Drakeford resigns as First minister of Wales after five years in incumbent.
  - Bernard Looney, the former chief executive of BP, is to forfeit up to £32.4m in salary and benefits after an investigation found he committed "serious misconduct" in failing to disclose relationships with colleagues.
- 14 December
  - The Bank of England keeps interest rates on hold for a third consecutive time at 5.25%.
  - 17-year-old Alex Batty, a boy from Oldham who went missing in 2017 while on holiday in Spain, is reported by French Police to have been found at Revel, a town east of Toulouse in France.
  - Three men are convicted of attempted murder after two children (including an 11-year-old girl) were shot while playing on a climbing frame, in Wolverhampton.
  - Panini Group launches the first sticker album for the Women's Super League.
- 15 December
  - The High Court rules that Prince Harry was the victim of phone hacking by Mirror Group Newspapers and awards him £140,600 in damages. Separately, the judge rules that Piers Morgan knew about phone hacking – and was involved – while editor of the Daily Mirror.
  - Muslim convert Edward Little, who planned to kill a Christian preacher at Speaker's Corner in London's Hyde Park, is sentenced to life imprisonment with a minimum term of 16 years following a trial at the Old Bailey.
  - Network Rail regional manager Michelle Handforth resigns from her post following a power outage at Ladbroke Grove earlier in the month which left hundreds of train passengers stranded for several hours.
- 16 December
  - Sunak travels to Italy to attend a right-wing rally in Rome, where he discusses his immigration policy and calls for changes to global refugee rules.
  - Defence Secretary Grant Shapps confirms that the British destroyer HMS Diamond has shot down a suspected attack drone in the Red Sea, the first time the Royal Navy has shot down an aerial object in anger since 1991.
  - Greater Manchester Police confirm that teenager Alex Batty has returned to the UK.
- 17 December
  - The UK's first spaceport for vertical rocket launches is granted planning approval by the Civil Aviation Authority. Full orbital launches from the site, on the remote Scottish island of Unst, are expected to commence from 2025.
  - Michelle Mone says that, under specific circumstances, she could benefit from some of the profits made by personal protective equipment sold to the UK government during the COVID-19 pandemic by a company run by her husband, Doug Barrowman.
  - Ian Wright announces that he will step down as a pundit from Match of the Day at the end of the premier league season.
- 18 December
  - Fezolinetant, a non-hormonal drug used to treat menopause-related hot flushes and night sweats, is approved for use in the UK.
  - Chief Veterinary Officer Christine Middlemiss confirms that 4,000 American XL bully dog owners have applied for exemption from a forthcoming ban on the breed, but warns there could be more XL bullies living in the UK.
  - A dress worn by Diana, Princess of Wales in 1985 sells at an auction for £904,262 ($1,148,080), eleven times its estimated price.
  - Speaking on BBC Radio 4's The Today Podcast, television presenter Dame Esther Rantzen, who has been diagnosed with stage four lung cancer, reveals that she has joined the Dignitas organisation and plans to "buzz off to Zurich" if her treatment does not work. Her comments reopen the debate about assisted dying in the United Kingdom.
- 19 December
  - The UK government publishes new guidelines advising schools in England on how to deal with pupils who wish to change their gender, be known under a different name or wear a different uniform, urging schools to "take a very cautious approach" and to inform parents of any gender related issues.
  - DNA profiling of a 2,000-year-old skeleton unearthed in Cambridgeshire provides evidence that a nomadic race of people from Southern Russia, known as Sarmatians, travelled to Britain during the Roman era.
  - Independent and former Conservative MP Peter Bone loses his seat following a recall petition, triggering a by-election in Wellingborough.
  - The British Museum signs a £50m deal with BP to help it fund a major renovation project.
- 20 December
  - Data from the Office for National Statistics shows UK inflation fell to 3.9% in November 2023, the lowest for more than two years, down from 4.6% the previous month. The fall, which is sharper than expected, is largely attributed to fuel and food costs declining and household goods prices 'slowing'. The Bank of England's target for inflation is 2%.
  - Tánaiste Micheál Martin announces Irish government plans to "initiate an inter-State case against the United Kingdom under the European Convention on Human Rights" over provisions in the Northern Ireland Troubles (Legacy and Reconciliation) Act 2023 which offers immunity from prosecution for certain Troubles-era related offences.
  - Junior doctors in England begin another three-day strike over their long-running pay dispute.
  - A number of ballet dancers are reported to have come forward to make claims about incidents of "body shaming" at UK ballet schools following a BBC investigation into the subject earlier in the year.
  - COVID-19 in the UK: JN.1 is reported as a new variant of interest, following a recent, rapid rise in COVID-19 cases.
  - A teenage boy and girl who shared an obsession with violence and torture are convicted of the murder of Brianna Ghey.
  - Lawrence Bierton is sentenced to a whole life order for the murder of his neighbour, 73-year-old Pauline Quinn, who he battered to death with a coffee table while out on parole following his conviction for two previous murders in 1996.
  - The Scottish Government confirms it will abandon its legal challenge against the UK government's veto of the Gender Recognition Reform (Scotland) Bill.
  - Eight-year-old girl, Bodhana Sivanandan from Harrow, London is crowned best female player at the European blitz chess championships in Zagreb, Croatia.
  - The three men convicted of attempted murder for shooting two children on 14 December are jailed for 23 years.
- 21 December
  - Figures show that UK government borrowing fell in November to £14.3bn, which was above forecasts of £13bn.
  - Mrs Justice Yip, who presided over the trial of the two teenagers who killed Brianna Ghey, confirms she will lift the anonymity order protecting their identities when they are sentenced in February 2024.
  - Following a three-week trial at the Old Bailey, Joshua Jacques is found guilty of the April 2022 murder of his girlfriend, Samantha Drummonds, and three members of her family in Bermondsey, south London.
  - Eurostar is forced to cancel a number of services following a last-minute strike by staff at the Channel Tunnel operator, Getlink. Eurostar urges its customers not to travel as a result of the strike.
  - A woman is arrested on suspicion of murder after a four-year-old boy dies from knife injuries in Hackney, east London.
  - A yellow weather warning is in place as the UK is hit by high winds as a result of Storm Pia.
- 22 December
  - Revised figures show that UK GDP contracted by 0.1% between July and October 2023, having previously shown zero growth for the period, and presenting the risk of a recession.
  - Greater Manchester Police announce they have launched a criminal investigation into the alleged child abduction of teenager Alex Batty.
  - Following his conviction at Birmingham Crown Court in September, student Mohamad Al Bared, of Coventry, is sentenced to life imprisonment with a minimum of 20 years for building a drone that was intended for use in a chemical weapons attack on behalf of Islamic State.
  - A "stop" traffic sign with three 3D military drones painted on by Banksy is unveiled. The artwork has an anti-war theme believed to be relating to the Gaza war. However, it is stolen one hour after its unveiling in Peckham, London.
- 23 December
  - The Metropolitan Police launches an investigation after a street sign in Peckham, London featuring the work of Banksy is stolen. A man is arrested on suspicion of theft and criminal damage during the first day of investigation.
  - An increase in environmental activists being referred to the Prevent terrorism programme is reported, following the recent rise in disruptive climate protests.
- 24 December
  - A second man is arrested on suspicion of theft and criminal damage after a road sign featuring work by street artist Banksy was stolen.
  - Home Secretary James Cleverly apologises for a joke about his wife in which he said, "a little bit of Rohypnol in her drink every night" is "not really illegal", just hours after the Home Office announced plans to crack down on spiking.
  - Two teenagers die and three others are injured in a three-car crash in Cramlington, Northumberland.
  - The warmest Christmas Eve since 1997 is recorded, with temperatures of up to 15.3 °C (59.5 °F).
  - British businessman Sir Jim Ratcliffe agrees a deal worth an estimated £1.3bn to buy a 25% share in Manchester United.
  - The Ministry of Defence confirms that HMS Trent will take part in joint military exercises in Guyana in early 2024 as Venezuela renews its claims in the Guyana–Venezuela territorial dispute.
- 25 December
  - The Met Office provisionally confirms the highest daily minimum temperature for Christmas Day on record, at 12.4 °C (54.3 °F). However, a white Christmas is recorded in the Scottish Highlands, with snow falling in Tulloch Bridge and Aviemore.
  - Police are investigating a fire at the constituency office of Mike Freer, the MP for North Finchley and Golders Green, which broke out on Christmas Eve.
  - The Food Standards Agency has issued recall notices for five brands of cheese amid concerns they could contain the E.coli bug.
  - King Charles III delivers his second Christmas message in which he emphasises the "universal" values shared between different religions at a time of "increasingly tragic conflict around the world".
- 26 December
  - Analysts predict that property prices will fall in 2024 but that the cost of rents will rise.
  - A major study published by the Jama Network indicates that a deficiency in Vitamin D, depression and diabetes are major contributing factors to early onset dementia.
  - A yellow weather warning is issued for heavy rain and high winds ahead of the arrival of Storm Gerrit, expected to cause disruption the following day.
- 27 December
  - The UK government announces that pint-sized bottles of still and sparkling wine will appear on the shelves of British supermarkets.
  - Storm Gerrit: A major incident is declared after a tornado rips through parts of Greater Manchester, knocking down trees and causing significant damage to properties. No injuries are reported.
- 28 December
  - Storm Gerrit: Almost 8,000 homes are still without power after blizzards and flooding in Scotland.
  - Three men die after a four by four goes into the River Esk in North Yorkshire.
  - The UK Health Security Agency says that at least 30 cases of E.coli may be linked to cheese brands recalled on Christmas Day.
  - Confidential papers released by the UK government show that former prime minister Tony Blair was keen for an English Premiership football club to move to Belfast, because he felt it would be a "significant breakthrough if Belfast had a football team playing in the English Premier League". Discussions were also held in the 1990s about relocating Wimbledon F.C. to Belfast because Wimbledon needed to move from its Plough Lane stadium as a result of the findings of the Taylor Report into the Hillsborough disaster. It was suggested the club could be renamed Belfast United.
- 29 December
  - BBC News reports that a person has died in Scotland following an E.coli outbreak linked to cheese.
  - Newly released government documents from 2003 show that then-Prime Minister Tony Blair was presented with measures to tackle immigration that included constructing a detention camp on the Isle of Mull and breaking international law.
  - 2024 New Year Honours: Those recognised include Alexander McCall Smith (KBE), Tim Martin (KBE), Stuart Broad (CBE), Sir Ridley Scott (GBE), Shirley Bassey (CH), Michael Eavis (KBE), Jilly Cooper (DBE), Sajid Javid (KBE), Margaret Beckett (DBE), Mary Earps (MBE), Emilia Clarke (MBE), Millie Bright (OBE) and Leona Lewis (OBE).
  - The UK government says that a report published on the GOV.UK website on 27 December that said housing asylum seekers on the Bibby Stockholm barge was discriminatory on the grounds of age and sex was published by mistake. The report is deleted from the website.
- 30 December
  - Eurostar services to and from London St Pancras are cancelled because of a flood in a tunnel under the River Thames.
  - British Army officer Preet Chandi becomes the fastest woman to complete a trek to the South Pole on skis.
  - Four police officers are injured and eight people arrested following a demonstration in Camberwell, south London, relating to tensions in the local Eritrean community.
- 31 December
  - American XL bully dogs are added to the list of banned species under the Dangerous Dogs Act 1991 in England and Wales, requiring them to be on a lead and muzzled in public. It is also illegal to breed, sell or abandon the dogs.
  - Eurostar resumes services to and from London St Pancras following the previous day's disruption.
  - Two people killed in an avalanche at the French ski resort of Saint-Gervais-les-Bains on 28 December are named as British mother and son Kate and Archie Vokes.

== See also ==
- Politics in the United Kingdom
- 2020s in United Kingdom political history
- 2023 in United Kingdom politics and government
- Timeline of the COVID-19 pandemic in the United Kingdom (2023)
- 2023 in British music
- 2023 in British television
- 2023 in British radio
- List of British films of 2023
