= 2023 in United Kingdom politics and government =

A list of events relating to politics and government in the United Kingdom in 2023.

== Events ==
=== January ===
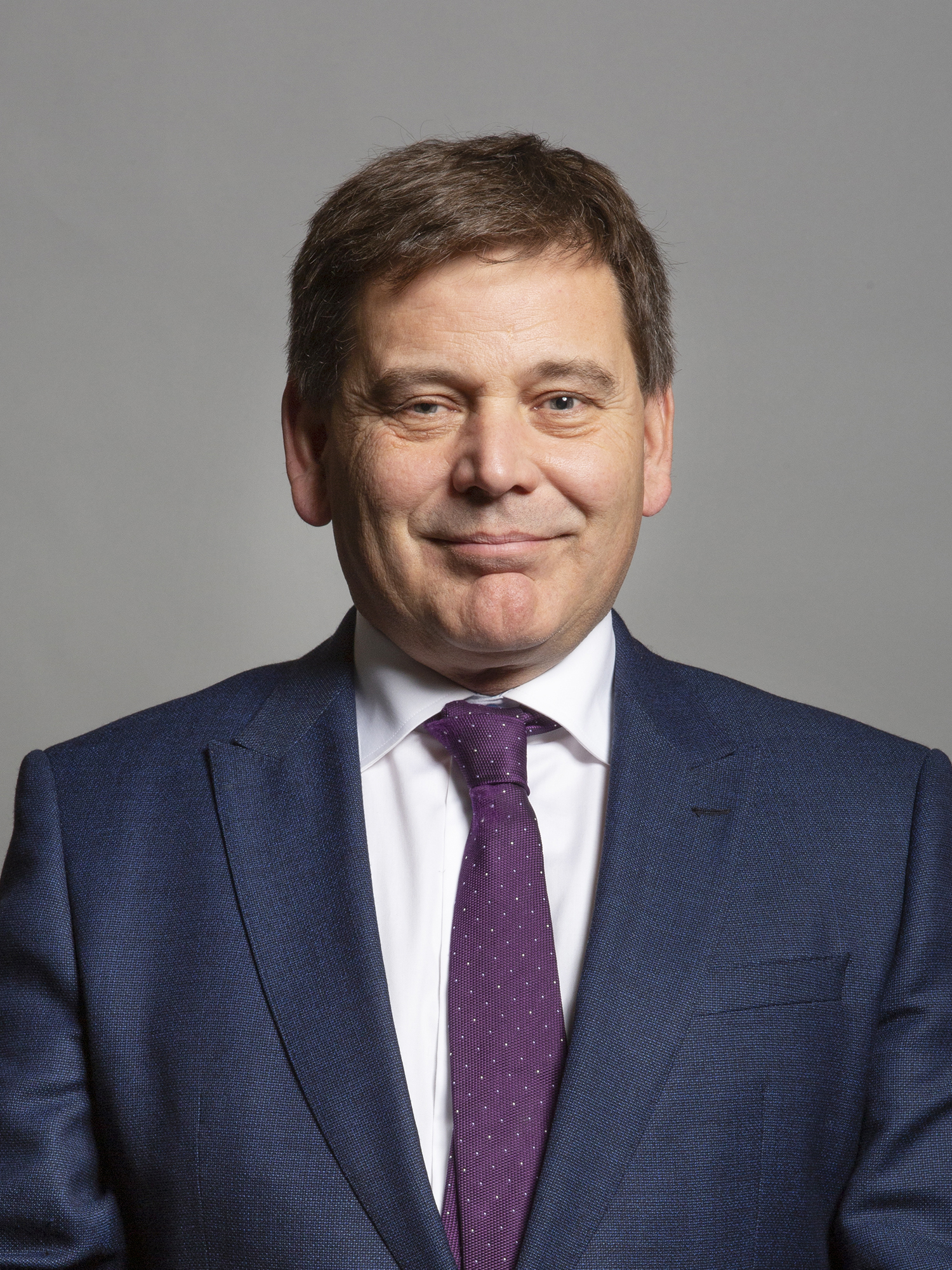
Andrew Bridgen was suspended by the Conservative Party in January 2023, and would later join the Reclaim Party.

- 1 January – The Baroness Stedman-Scott steps down from the post of Parliamentary Under-Secretary of State for Work and Pensions.
- 5 January – The UK government confirms it will not go ahead with a plan to privatise Channel 4.
- 9 January – A new scheme to support businesses with the cost of energy bills is outlined in the House of Commons to replace existing support due to end in March. The scheme will replace capped energy bills with a wholesale discount on gas and electricity, and only apply when energy bills are high. Industries such as glass, ceramics and steel, which use a greater amount of energy, will get a larger discount than others.
- 10 January – The UK government published the Strikes (Minimum Service Levels) Bill 2023, designed to require public sector organisations to provide a minimum service when their unions vote to strike.
- 11 January – Andrew Bridgen, the MP for North West Leicestershire, is suspended from the Conservative Party for spreading misinformation about COVID-19 vaccines after posting a tweet comparing them to The Holocaust.
- 12 January – Prime Minister Rishi Sunak and First Minister of Scotland Nicola Sturgeon hold talks at a hotel in Inverness.
- 13 January – Former GB News presenter Mercy Muroki has been appointed by the UK government to advise Kemi Badenoch, the Minister for Women and Equalities, on gender policy.
- 16 January –
  - The UK government announces it will block the Gender Recognition Reform (Scotland) Bill amid concerns about its impact on UK-wide equality law.
  - MPs vote 309–249 in favour of the Strikes (Minimum Service Levels) Bill, which now moves to the committee stage.
- 19 January – Prime Minister Sunak apologises for taking his seat belt off in a moving car to film a social media clip. Lancashire Police later say they are "looking into" the incident. He is issued with a fixed-penalty notice the following day.
- 22 January – Labour's chairwoman, Anneliese Dodds writes to Daniel Greenberg, the Parliamentary Commissioner for Standards, requesting "an urgent investigation" into claims that Richard Sharp, the chairman of the BBC, helped former prime minister Boris Johnson secure a loan guarantee weeks before Johnson recommended him for the BBC chairmanship.
- 23 January –
  - William Shawcross, the Commissioner for Public Appointments, is to hold a review into the process of appointing Chairman of the BBC Richard Sharp following claims he helped then-Prime Minister Boris Johnson secure a loan guarantee shortly before his appointment.
  - Prime Minister Sunak orders his Independent Adviser on Ministers' Interests to investigate a disclosure that Chairman of the Conservative Party Nadhim Zahawi paid a £5m penalty to HM Revenue and Customs for unpaid taxes during his time as Chancellor of the Exchequer.
- 26 January – GB News have hired Conservative MP and former leader of the House of Commons Jacob Rees-Mogg as a presenter.
- 28 January – Eric Pickles, chair of the Advisory Committee on Business Appointments, says that Nadine Dorries, the former secretary of state for culture, has breached the ministerial code by not consulting the watchdog about her appointment as a presenter on TalkTV, where she is to present a weekly show from 3 February.
- 29 January – Nadhim Zahawi is dismissed as chair of the Conservative Party after an inquiry finds he committed a "serious breach of the ministerial code" over his tax affairs.
- 30 January –
  - William Shawcross, the commissioner for public appointments, steps back from the planned investigation into how Richard Sharp got the job as BBC chairman because of previous contact between them. Another investigator will be appointed to take on the inquiry.
  - MPs vote 315–246 in favour of the Strikes (Minimum Service Levels) Bill, which is then sent to the House of Lords for further debate.

=== February ===
- 5 February – In a move seen as marking her return to political life, former prime minister Liz Truss writes an article for The Sunday Telegraph in which she says her economic agenda was never given a "realistic chance".
- 7 February – Prime Minister Sunak performs a cabinet reshuffle. Greg Hands is named as the new Conservative Party chairman; Grant Shapps becomes the secretary of state for energy, security and net zero in a newly formed department; Kemi Badenoch is appointed as the first secretary of state at the newly created Department for Business and Trade, with continued responsibility as equalities minister.
- 8 February
  - Ukraine's president Volodymyr Zelenskyy addresses a joint session of Parliament during his first visit to the UK since Russia invaded his country. He later visits Buckingham Palace for a meeting with the King.
  - Former Labour MP Jared O'Mara, who submitted fake expense claims to fund his cocaine habit, is convicted of fraud. He is sentenced the following day to four years in prison.
- 9 February –
  - The Independent Parliamentary Standards Authority confirms that MPs pay will increase by 2.9% from April 2023, taking their salary from £84,144 to £86,584.
  - 2023 West Lancashire by-election: Labour hold the seat with a 62.3% vote share, and an increase of 10.3%. Ashley Dalton is the new MP.
  - Former Culture secretary Nadine Dorries announces she will step down as an MP at the next general election.
  - In a radio interview before his appointment as Deputy Chairman of the Conservative Party, Lee Anderson said he would support the return of capital punishment where the perpetrators are clearly identifiable. Prime Minister Rishi Sunak said neither he nor the government shared Anderson's stance.
- 13 February – Douglas Alexander, a minister in the governments of Tony Blair and Gordon Brown, who lost his seat in the 2015 general election, announces he will stand for parliament again at the next election as Labour's candidate for East Lothian.
- 15 February –
  - Nicola Sturgeon announces her resignation as First Minister of Scotland and Leader of the Scottish National Party after eight years in the role; she will stay on until her successor has been elected.
  - Jeremy Corbyn will not stand as a Labour MP at the next general election, the party's leader, Sir Keir Starmer, confirms.
- 16 February – Deputy First Minister of Scotland John Swinney rules himself out of the SNP leadership contest.
- 19 February –
  - Former prime minister Boris Johnson urges present prime minister Rishi Sunak not to scrap the Northern Ireland Protocol Bill, warning to do so would be a "great mistake".
  - Scottish Health Secretary Humza Yousaf and former minister for community safety Ash Regan become the first two candidates to announce they will stand in the Scottish National Party leadership election. Keith Brown, the SNP's depute leader, Neil Gray, the minister for international development, and Màiri McAllan, the Environment Minister, all rule themselves out of the contest.
  - In a speech to the Scottish Labour Party conference in Edinburgh, Labour leader Sir Keir Starmer rules out a deal with the SNP "under any circumstances", and warns against complacency following the departure of Nicola Sturgeon as SNP leader and first minister.
- 20 February – Scotland's Finance Secretary, Kate Forbes, announces she is running in the Scottish National Party leadership election.
- 21 February –
  - The UK Government announces that it had a budget surplus in January, with £5bn more in revenue than predicted.
  - Kate Forbes insists her campaign to become the next SNP leader has not been derailed after she lost the support of several colleagues following comments about same-sex marriage and having children outside marriage, both of which she is opposed to as a member of the Free Church of Scotland.
  - MSPs vote 68–57 to approve the Scottish Government's budget for the 2023–24 financial year, which includes a tax rise for everyone in Scotland earning more than £43,662.
- 23 February –
  - Labour leader Sir Keir Starmer outlines the five key issues that his party will focus on during the run up to the 2024 general election: higher economic growth, clean energy, improving the NHS, reforming the justice system, and raising education standards.
  - Environment Secretary Therese Coffey, commenting on the vegetable shortage, tells MPs "we anticipate the situation will last about another two to four weeks".
- 24 February – Nominations close for the SNP leadership election, with Kate Forbes, Ash Regan and Humza Yousaf having all reached the threshold of supporters to go forward into the contest.
- 25 February – Theo Clarke, the Conservative MP for Stafford, is deselected by her constituency party a week after returning to Parliament from maternity leave.
- 26 February –
  - Luciana Berger, who left the Labour Party in 2019 following the antisemitism controversy, is to re-join the party after accepting an apology from Sir Keir Starmer, who said there had been a "litany of failures".
  - Betty Boothroyd, who became the first female Speaker of the House of Commons in 1992, dies at the age of 93.
- 27 February – Sunak, and President of the European Commission, Ursula von der Leyen, announce a new Brexit deal for Northern Ireland, named the Windsor Framework.

=== March ===
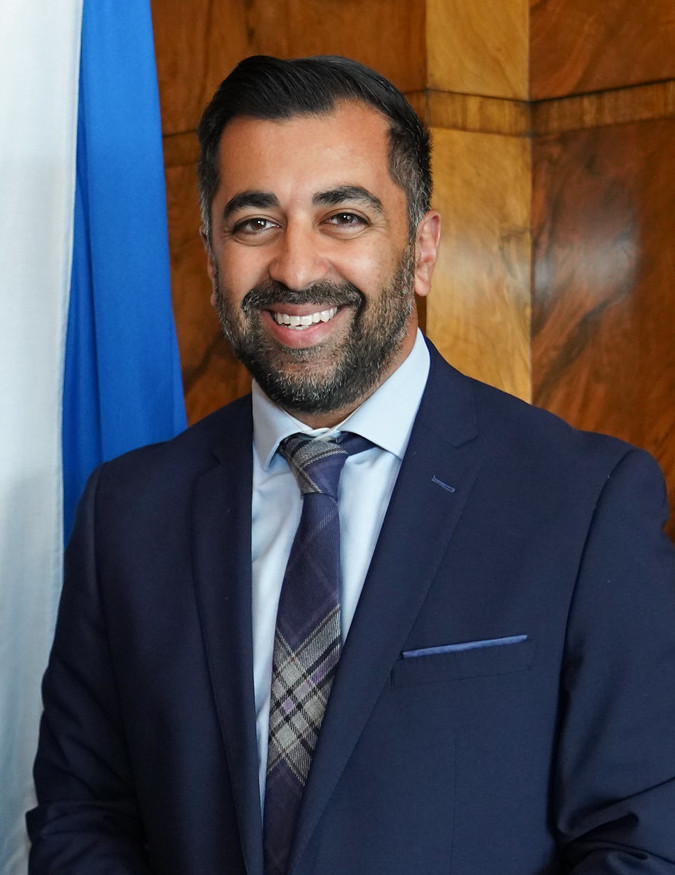
Humza Yousaf succeeded Nicola Sturgeon as Leader of the Scottish National Party (SNP), in March 2023.

- 1 March – COVID-19 in the UK: WhatsApp messages leaked to the Daily Telegraph are reported as suggesting former Health Secretary Matt Hancock chose to ignore advise from experts in April 2020 that there should be "testing of all going into care homes". A spokesman for Hancock said "These stolen messages have been doctored to create a false story that Matt rejected clinical advice on care home testing”.
- 2 March –
  - COVID-19 in the UK: The Daily Telegraph publishes more of Matt Hancock's WhatsApp exchanges, this time with former education secretary Gavin Williamson in December 2020, when a debate into whether schools should reopen following the Christmas holiday was taking place. The leaked messages suggest Hancock favoured school closures, while Williamson was more hesitant. Hancock, who worked alongside journalist Isabel Oakeshott to co-author a book, describes the release of the messages as a "massive betrayal and breach of trust". In response, Oakeshott says she released the messages because she believed doing so was in the "public interest".
  - Sir Keir Starmer unveils Sue Gray, who led the investigation into the Partygate scandal, as Labour's new chief of staff, sparking concern among some Conservative MPs about her impartiality. On the same day, Gray resigns from her post as Cabinet Office Second Permanent Secretary and leaves the Civil Service.
  - Scotland's Minister for Transport, Jenny Gilruth, announces plans to nationalise the overnight Caledonian Sleeper train service that links London with several locations in Scotland, taking effect from 25 June.
- 3 March –
  - The Commons Select Committee of Privileges finds that former prime minister Boris Johnson may have misled Parliament over the Partygate scandal after evidence suggested breaches of COVID-19 rules would have been "obvious" to him. In response Johnson says that none of the evidence shows he "knowingly" misled parliament, and that "it is clear from this report that I have not committed any contempt of parliament".
  - The latest leaked WhatsApp messages published by the Daily Telegraph are reported as appearing to show former Health Secretary Matt Hancock and Cabinet Secretary Simon Case joking about locking people in quarantine hotels.
  - Rupa Huq is allowed to rejoin the Labour Party five months after being suspended over comments she made about former Conservative chancellor Kwasi Kwarteng.
  - Buckingham Palace announces the first state visit to be made by Charles III and Camilla as King and Queen Consort; they will travel to France and Germany between 26 and 31 March.
- 4 March – Leaked WhatsApp messages published by the Daily Telegraph indicate Matt Hancock and his staff deliberated over whether or not he had broken COVID-19 regulations after pictures of him kissing his aide, Gina Coladangelo, were published by The Sun newspaper. In another conversation, the messages show Hancock criticising the Eat Out to Help Out scheme for "causing problems" in areas where there was a high number of COVID-19 cases.
- 5 March –
  - News outlets including BBC News, Sky News and The Independent (who have not verified the messages) report that further WhatsApp messages published by The Telegraph appear to show discussions about how and when the government should reveal details of the Kent COVID-19 variant in order to ensure people would comply with the regulations. The news outlets also says Hancock appears to suggest they should "frighten the pants off everyone", while in another conversation, head of the civil service Simon Case suggests the "fear/guilt factor" was an important element of the government's messaging. The Telegraph also reports messages showing ministers and civil servants discussing "[getting] heavy with the police" to enforce lockdown measures with senior police officers being brought into Number 10 to be told to be stricter with the public.
  - Speaking to the Mail on Sunday, Sunak says that migrants arriving in the UK on small boats will be prevented from seeking asylum under proposed new legislation to be brought before Parliament.
- 6 March – The Telegraph publishes messages that are reported to have been exchanged between Allan Nixon, a parliamentary advisor and Hancock from November 2020 in which they discuss threatening to cancel projects in MPs constituencies if MPs do not support the local lockdown tiers legislation. It is also reported that as part of a strategy aimed at trying to stop MPs from rebelling against the legislation, party whips compiled a spreadsheet of 95 MPs who disagreed with this policy and the reasons for them disagreeing; these related to lack of parliamentary scrutiny, economic harm, harms to hospital, absence of cost benefit analysis and the policy being "unconservative".
- 7 March –
  - Home Secretary Suella Braverman introduces the Illegal Migration Bill into the House of Commons, which is designed to stop migrants arriving in the UK by boat. The legislation proposes to detain and remove those from the UK who arrive by illegal means, as well as blocking them from returning.
  - STV hosts the first televised debate of the Scottish National Party leadership election.
- 9 March – The UK government announces a two-year delay in the construction of the Birmingham to Crewe leg of HS2 in order to save costs.
- 10 March – The King bestows the title of Duke of Edinburgh on his younger brother, Prince Edward.
- 13 March –
  - Prime Minister Rishi Sunak announces an extra £5bn of government spending for UK defence over the coming two years.
  - Voting opens in the Scottish National Party leadership election.
- 14 March – BBC Scotland hosts the final televised debate of the SNP leadership election.
- 15 March – Chancellor of the Exchequer Jeremy Hunt presents the 2023 budget to the House of Commons.
- 16 March – The UK government announces that TikTok is to be banned on electronic devices used by ministers and other employees, amid security concerns relating to the Chinese-owned app's handling of user data. The Welsh Government also announces the app will be banned from all its official devices.
- 18 March – Peter Murrell resigns as chief executive of the Scottish National Party amid a row over party membership. Mike Russell succeeds him as interim chief executive.
- 19 March – The UK government launches the Emergency Alerts service, a service to send text alerts to mobile phones in a situation where it is perceived there is an immediate risk to life.
- 21 March –
  - Partygate scandal: Former prime minister Boris Johnson publishes a 52-page defence of his actions during the COVID-19 pandemic in which he acknowledges misleading Parliament over the Partygate scandal, but says he did not do so intentionally.
  - At 8pm, Times Radio airs a leadership debate from Edinburgh and featuring the three candidates in the Scottish National Party leadership election.
  - Stormont is to ban Northern Ireland's civil servants from using the TikTok app on their official devices following a similar decision by the Westminster Government.
- 22 March –
  - Boris Johnson gives evidence to the cross-party Privileges Committee, relating to his conduct during Partygate. He insists that he "did not lie" to the House of Commons and always made statements in good faith.
  - MPs back Rishi Sunak's new Brexit deal for Northern Ireland by 515 votes to 29.
  - Scotland's First Minister, Nicola Sturgeon, issues a "sincere, heartfelt and unreserved" apology to people affected by the practice of forced adoption in Scotland during the 1950s, 1960s and 1970s.
- 23 March –
  - Nicola Sturgeon attends her final First Minister's Questions as First Minister of Scotland.
  - The TikTok app is banned on all Scottish Government phones and electric devices. The Westminster Parliament also announces that the app will be banned on "all parliamentary devices and the wider parliamentary network".
- 24 March – MPs vote to back the Protection from Sex-based Harassment in Public Bill, which will make catcalling, following someone or blocking their path an offence in England and Wales with a punishment of up to two years in prison.
- 25 March –
  - Reports in The Sun and i newspapers suggest former prime minister Liz Truss, who was in office for 49 days, has submitted a Resignation Honours list.
  - London City Hall bans its staff from using TikTok on all its official devices.
- 26 March – The Observer reports on a sting operation staged by the campaign group Led By Donkeys in which former ministers Matt Hancock and Kwasi Kwarteng agreed to work for a fake South Korean company for £10,000 per day.
- 27 March –
  - Humza Yousaf succeeds Nicola Sturgeon as Leader of the SNP.
  - HM Treasury says it has scrapped plans for the Royal Mint to produce a government backed Non-fungible token that could be traded on international markets.
- 28 March –
  - Humza Yousaf is confirmed as Scotland's first minister by a vote in the Scottish Parliament.
  - Kate Forbes is to leave the Scottish Government after turning down a position in the Yousaf ministry.
  - Labour's National Executive Committee votes 22–12 in favour of a motion blocking former leader Jeremy Corbyn from standing as a Labour candidate at the next general election.
  - Two Conservative MPs in the Black Country area of the West Midlands Stuart Anderson and Nicola Richards announce they will not stand for Parliament at the next election.
- 29 March –
  - Charles III begins a state visit to Germany, his first official overseas trip as monarch.
  - The UK government introduces the Victims and Prisoners Bill into the House of Commons, which will give ministers the power to veto the release of some prisoners, and restrict marriage in prison for those serving whole life terms.
  - Humza Yousaf is sworn in as Scotland's first minister at Edinburgh's Court of Session and begins naming his cabinet.
- 30 March –
  - During his state visit to Germany, Charles III becomes the first British monarch to address the Bundestag.
  - The Cabinet Office issues ministers with updated guidelines on the use of messaging apps such as WhatsApp for government business, advising them to use the apps "with care" and never to use them for information classified as "secret".
  - The Parliamentary Standards Committee recommends that former Scottish National Party MP Margaret Ferrier be suspended from the House of Commons for 30 days for breaching COVID-19 regulations in September 2020 when she took a train home from London following a positive COVID test.
  - Humza Yousaf attends his first session of First Minister's Questions since his election as Scotland's first minister. The session is interrupted on several occasions by climate change protesters, forcing the Presiding Officer of the Scottish Parliament to clear the gallery of visitors.

=== April ===
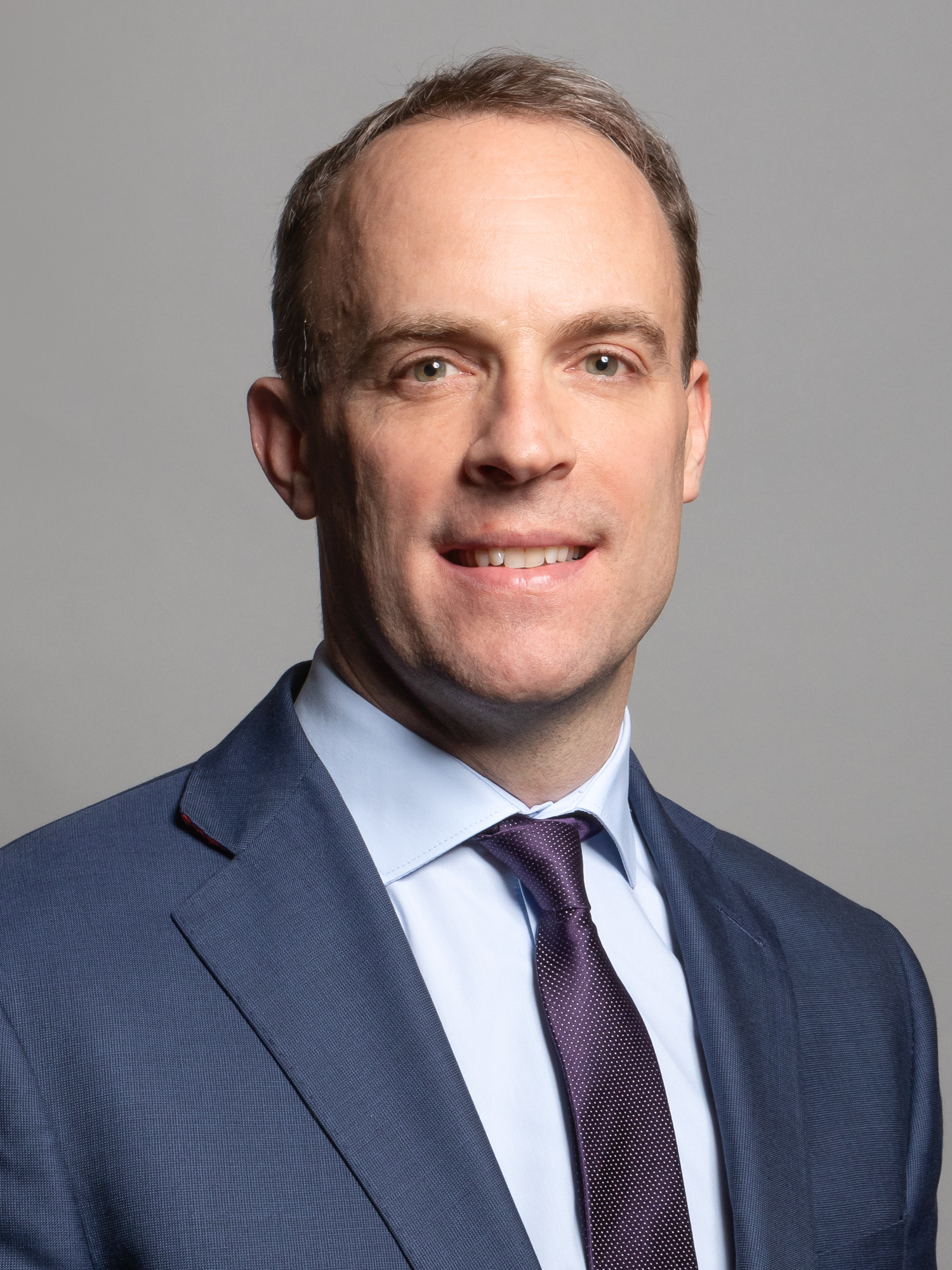
Dominic Raab resigned as deputy prime minister in April 2023.

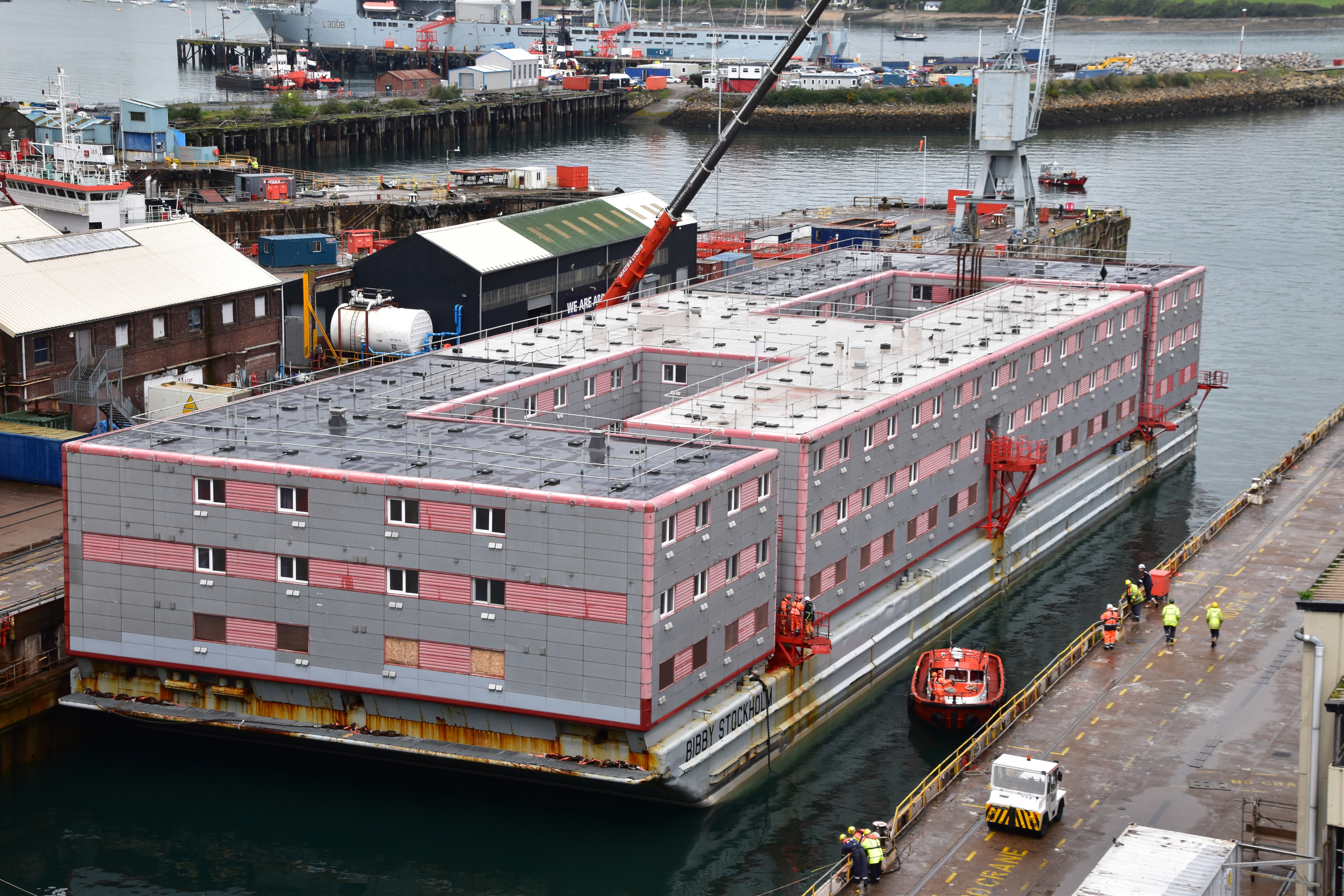
The barge, known as the Bibby Stockholm, is stationed in Portland Harbour in Dorset to house asylum seekers from April 2023, causing widespread controversy amongst local residents and the country at large.

- 3 April – Environment Minister Therese Coffey confirms government plans to ban wet wipes containing plastic in England as a means of helping to tackle water pollution.
- 4 April – Immigration Minister Robert Jenrick is given a six-month driving ban by magistrates after he was caught speeding on the M1.
- 5 April –
  - The UK government confirms plans to use the vessel Bibby Stockholm to house around 500 male migrants off the Dorset Coast, citing the cheaper cost of doing so compared to housing them in hotels.
  - Home Secretary Suella Braverman wins a selection for the newly created Parliamentary seat of Fareham and Waterlooville, beating fellow Conservative MP Flick Drummond.
  - The Times publishes video of an undercover investigation in which Conservative MP Scott Benton apparently offers to lobby on behalf of a fake company. Benton subsequently has the party whip withdrawn.
  - Police arrest former SNP chief executive Peter Murrell as part of their investigation into the party's finances and release him later without charge pending further investigation.
- 6 April – An inquiry concludes without being able to determine whether Conservative MP Mark Spencer told colleague Nus Ghani that her Muslim faith was a factor in her sacking.
- 7 April –
  - BBC News reports that Johnston Carmichael, the accountants who audit the SNP's accounts, have resigned from the role, citing a their decision to do so as having been taken following a review of their clients.
  - Labour are accused by critics of practicing "dog whistle" and "gutter politics" following the release of adverts personally attacking Prime Minister Rishi Sunak with claims that he does not believe people convicted of child sex offences should be sent to prison.
- 8 April – SNP president Mike Russell tells The Herald newspaper he does not think Scottish independence can be achieved "right now", and that the party is facing its biggest crisis for 50 years.
- 10 April – Sir Keir Starmer says that he stands "by every word" of the Labour Party's adverts attacking Rishi Sunak despite criticism from fellow party members.
- 12 April – SNP leader Humza Yousaf confirms that his party will not pay any legal fees for former chief executive Peter Murrell, but that he will not be suspended from the party because he is "innocent until proven guilty".
- 13 April – Andrew Edwards, a councillor representing a ward in Haverfordwest, is suspended from the Conservative Party after his voice is identified on a recording in which someone stating a belief that white men should have black slaves.
- 14 April – Sir Robert Goodwill, Conservative MP for Scarborough and Whitby, confirms he will stand down as an MP at the next general election.
- 15 April –
  - The SNP's National Executive Committee orders a review of the party's transparency and governance.
  - Shaun Slater, a Bromley councillor who tweeted that it was "more likely" a rape victim was a prostitute whose "punter... didn't pay", is expelled from the Conservative Party.
- 16 April –
  - Scotland's Sunday Mail publishes leaked video purporting to show Nicola Sturgeon playing down concerns about the SNP's finances.
  - The SNP says that its finances are "in balance" following reports the party is facing a financial crisis.
- 17 April –
  - The Parliamentary Standards Commissioner is to investigate Prime Minister Rishi Sunak over a possible failure to declare an interest over a childcare company in which his wife has shares.
  - Sunak announces a review of the "core maths content" taught in England's schools, with the establishment of a panel to conduct the review.
  - MP Margaret Ferrier confirms she will appeal against her 30-day ban from the House of Commons.
- 18 April – SNP treasurer Colin Beattie is arrested and questioned by Police Scotland in connection with their ongoing investigation into the party's finances.
- 19 April –
  - Downing Street publishes a full list of financial interests for all ministers, including those of Rishi Sunak which mention a childcare company in which his wife has shares. Sunak had previously declared the shares to government officials, Downing Street said, and BBC News said it was told that this happened before he became prime minister. Downing Street had previously said work on the new list was ongoing.
  - Colin Beattie resigns as SNP treasurer with immediate effect.
- 20 April – Prime Minister Rishi Sunak is handed the findings of an investigation into bullying allegations against Deputy Prime Minister Dominic Raab.
- 21 April –
  - Dominic Raab resigns as deputy prime minister after the inquiry finds he acted in an "intimidating" and "insulting" manner with civil servants. He is succeeded by Oliver Dowden, who becomes deputy prime minister, and Alex Chalk, who takes on the role of Secretary of State for Justice. James Cartlidge replaces Chalk as Minister of State for Defence Procurement, and Cartlidge is replaced as Exchequer Secretary to the Treasury by backbencher Gareth Davies.
  - Raab subsequently criticises what he describes as "activist civil servants" attempting to block the work of government.
  - Chloe Smith is appointed as Secretary of State for Science and Innovation, standing in for Michelle Donelan during her maternity leave.
  - Julian Knight, the MP for Solihull, confirms he will stand down from Parliament at the next general election, and will also relinquish his role as chair of the House of Commons Digital, Culture, Media and Sport Committee.
- 23 April
  - Diane Abbott is suspended from the Labour Party after writing a letter in The Observer in which she downplays racism against Irish people, Jews, and Travellers.
  - The Emergency Alerts service is tested by the UK government at 3pm BST. An estimated 80% of smartphones are believed to be compatible to receive the alert, but around 7% of those do not receive it. Many people on the Three network report that the alert failed to appear on their phone, while others do not receive it because their phone is switched to aeroplane mode or they have disabled emergency alerts.
- 26 April –
  - Andrew Bridgen is expelled from the Conservative Party after comparing COVID-19 vaccines to the Holocaust and being found to have breached lobbying rules.
  - The Illegal Migration Bill passes its final stage in the House of Commons, with MPs voting 289–230 in favour of the bill.
- 27 April –
  - the secretary of state for business and trade Kemi Badenoch announced that the government was planning to reduce the number of laws to be repealed to around 800, as opposed to the government's original target of around 4,000 laws. Such reversal was met with dismay by Brexit advocates, including the bill's original architect Jacob Rees-Mogg.
- 28 April –
  - Richard Sharp resigns as Chairman of the BBC over his breach of the BBC's rules regarding public appointments after failing to declare his connection to a loan secured by former prime minister Boris Johnson worth £800,000.
  - Prime Minister Rishi Sunak tells the Welsh Conservatives that no more powers should be devolved to the Senedd and the Welsh Government as voters do not want politicians focused on "constitutional tinkeing".
- 29 April – The constituency Labour parties of Rutherglen and Hamilton, Larkhall and Stonehouse have written to Labour leader Sir Keir Starmer and Scottish Labour leader Anas Sarwar to make a formal complaint about the selection process for candidates, after being "inundated" with complaints by local members about a "lack of transparency".
- 30 April – Former prime minister Liz Truss is contesting a bill of around £12,000 she has been asked to pay by the government for costs incurred at Chevening House in Kent during her time as foreign secretary and while she was a candidate in the Summer 2022 Conservative leadership election.

=== May ===
- 2 May –
  - Deputy Prime Minister Oliver Dowden confirms that Sue Gray has chosen not to be interviewed for a Cabinet Office inquiry into her appointment as a senior Labour official. But Gray is cooperating with an Advisory Committee on Business Appointments inquiry into the appointment.
  - The Scottish Government reverses plans to give £46m to colleges and universities, having identified the money as an "essential saving".
- 3 May –
  - An independent review into the internal culture of Plaid Cymru identifies several issues within the party, and concludes that it needs to "detoxify a culture of harassment, bullying and misogyny".
  - The SNP signs a contract with a new auditor, Manchester-based AMS Accountants Group.
- 4 May – The 2023 United Kingdom local elections are held. There are significant losses for the Conservatives, while Labour and the Lib Dems gain control of a number of councils from the Conservatives. The Green Party also makes record gains, with over 200 councillors, and win majority control of Mid Suffolk District Council, the party's first ever council majority. The UK Independence Party, which had 500 council seats in 2014, loses the remainder of its councillors.
- 6 May – The Coronation of Charles III and Camilla takes place at Westminster Abbey, London.
- 7 May – Leaked text message conversations obtained by the BBC show members of Plaid Cymru discussed whether the party's leader, Adam Price, was fit for office in November 2022, and debated whether he should be removed from the post.
- 10 May –
  - Following his expulsion from the Conservative Party for calling COVID-19 vaccines the "biggest crime against humanity since the Holocaust," MP Andrew Bridgen announces he will join the Reclaim Party, giving the party its first parliamentary representative.
  - Adam Price announces his resignation as leader of Plaid Cymru after a report found a culture of misogyny, harassment and bullying in the party.
- 11 May –
  - Kemi Badenoch, the secretary of state for business, is reprimanded in the House of Commons by Speaker Lindsay Hoyle after the UK government's decision to scrap plans to allow EU-era legislation to expire was reported in the media before it was announced to Parliament.
  - Llyr Gruffydd is appointed interim leader of Plaid Cymru following the resignation of Adam Price.
- 16 May –
  - Javad Marandi, a businessman whose foreign companies were part of a global money laundering investigation, is named as a major donor to the Conservative Party.
  - Adam Price makes his final Senedd appearance as leader of Plaid Cymru.
- 17 May –
  - The Renters (Reform) Bill is introduced into Parliament.
  - The Home Affairs Select Committee hears evidence about the Metropolitan Police's approach to public order during the Coronation.
  - First Minister of Scotland Humza Yousaf attends his first audience with King Charles III at Buckingham Palace.
  - Llyr Gruffydd formally succeeds Adam Price as leader of Plaid Cymru.
- 18 May – The 2023 Northern Ireland local elections are held. Sinn Féin sees a net gain of 39 seats, increasing the party's Councillor count from 105 to 144 Councillors. DUP seeing no net gain or loss, siting at 122 seats and Alliance having a net gain of 14 Councillors with most other parties seeing losses.
- 19 May – Data collected from 160 local authorities in England shows that 26,165 were turned away from polling stations during England's local elections for not having valid ID. Of those, 16,588 later returned with ID later in the day, while 9,577 did not return.
- 20 May – Sinn Féin are now the largest political party in Northern Ireland after making significant gains in the local election votes.
- 21 May – Labour and the Liberal Democrats call for an inquiry into Home Secretary Suella Braverman after it is reported she asked civil servants to arrange a private speed awareness course after she was caught speeding in summer 2022 during her tenure as attorney general.
- 22 May – Former deputy prime minister Dominic Raab announces he will stand down from Parliament at the next election.
- 23 May – The Cabinet Office has referred former prime minister Boris Johnson to the police following fresh allegations of rule breaches during the COVID-19 pandemic.
- 24 May –
  - Prime Minister Rishi Sunak confirms that Home Secretary Suella Braverman's handling of a speeding offence did not breach ministerial rules and that she will not face an investigation.
  - Conservative MP Paul Bristow is asked to leave the House of Commons by Speaker Sir Lindsay Hoyle four minutes into Prime Minister's Questions for continuing to shout after MPs were warned about doing so.
  - Neil Coyle is reinstated as a Labour MP following a five-day suspension from the House of Commons after he was found to have breached harassment rules over racist comments he made to a journalist. Labour says his conduct will be monitored by the party's chief whip.
  - A group of eight former SNP councillors in North Lanarkshire form a new political party, Progressive Change NL, which becomes North Lanarkshire Council's second largest opposition party.
- 25 May –
  - A proposed vote by MPs on a 30-day House of Commons ban for Margaret Ferrier is postponed after there are deemed to be too few MPs present for the vote to carry.
  - An Independent Parliamentary Standards Authority investigation upholds a complaint against Labour MP Liam Byrne for using his parliamentary expenses to help fund his unsuccessful bid to become Mayor of the West Midlands in 2021.
  - Bablin Molik becomes the first woman of colour to be appointed as Lord Mayor of Cardiff.
- 28 May –
  - Four MPs who claimed fines for driving offences on their personal expenses have been asked to repay the money by parliamentary authorities.
  - The Home Office announces it is launching an ad campaign on social media in Albania to deter migrants from coming to the UK; the campaign will begin the following week.
- 31 May –
  - Labour's Nick Thomas-Symonds defends the party's decision to accept money from green entrepreneur Dale Vince, a supporter of Just Stop Oil describing him as a "legitimate person" to accept money from, and says that it has nothing to do with the party's views on the protest organisation.
  - Personal trainer Henry Morris reveals himself to be the person behind a parody Twitter account titled Secret Tory.

=== June ===
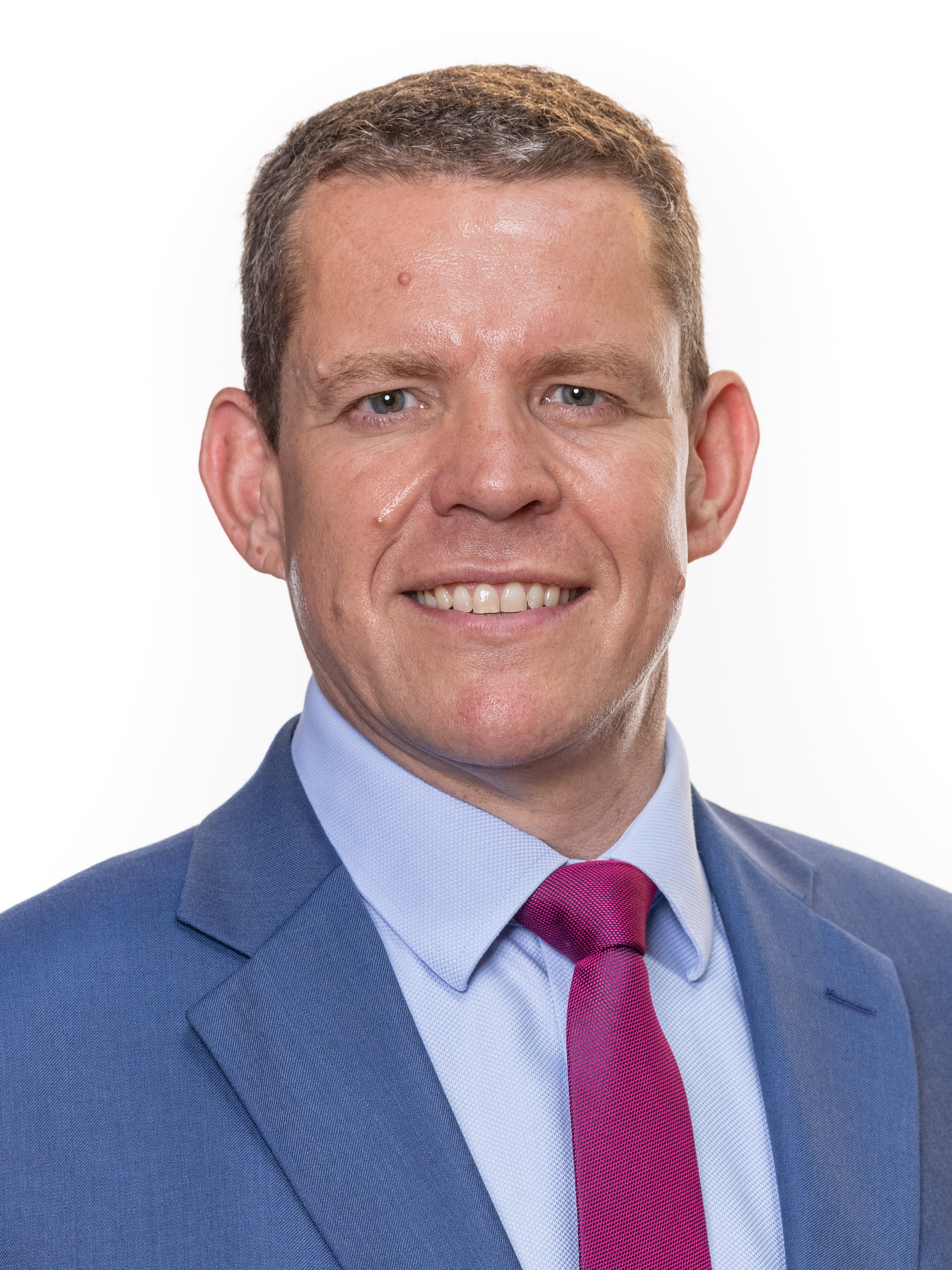
Rhun ap Iorwerth became the new leader of Plaid Cymru in June 2023.

- 1 June –
  - Labour suspend MP Geraint Davies from the party following allegations that he subjected younger members to unwanted sexual attention.
  - The UK government confirms it will launch a legal challenge over the COVID-19 Inquiry's demand for the unredacted version of Boris Johnson's WhatsApp messages and emails as the deadline on which the inquiry had demanded access to them expires.
- 2 June – Former prime minister Boris Johnson announces he is bypassing the Cabinet Office by directly supplying the COVID-19 inquiry with unredacted copies of his WhatsApp messages and emails.
- 5 June – The Parliamentary Standards Committee finds former Conservative MP Matt Hancock (now sitting as an independent) guilty of attempting to influence an investigation into Conservative MP Steve Brine, and orders him to apologise to Parliament.
- 6 June –
  - MPs vote to suspend Margaret Ferrier, the MP for Rutherglen and Hamilton West, from the House of Commons for 30 days for breaching COVID-19 regulations, almost certainly triggering a by-election in her constituency.
  - Ian Blackford, the SNP's leader at Westminster from 2017 to 2022, announces he will step down from Parliament at the next general election.
  - Kevin Stewart resigns as Scotland's Minister for Transport after experiencing poor mental health.
- 7 June –
  - Labour MP and frontbencher Gerald Jones wins his party's selection to become the Labour candidate for the new parliamentary seat of Merthyr Tydfil and Upper Cynon, which will be contested at the 2024 United Kingdom general election. The seat was ultimately renamed Merthyr Tydfil and Aberdare in the final recommendations.
  - Woking Borough Council imposes emergency spending restrictions on itself because of a £2bn debt.
- 8 June –
  - Prime Minister Rishi Sunak holds a joint press conference with US president Joe Biden at the White House to announce the Atlantic Declaration, an agreement to strengthen economic ties between the UK and US.
  - Caroline Lucas, the Green Party's former leader and only MP, announces that she is stepping down from Parliament at the next election.
  - Businessman Mohamed Mansour has donated £5m to the Conservative Party.
- 9 June –
  - Nadine Dorries announces she will stand down as Conservative MP for Mid Bedfordshire with immediate effect, triggering a by-election.
  - Boris Johnson's Resignation Honours are published. Highlights include knighthoods for Jacob Rees-Mogg and Simon Clarke, and a damehood for Priti Patel.
  - Johnson announces he will stand down as an MP with immediate effect after receiving the Commons Select Committee of Privileges's report into the Partygate scandal, triggering a by-election.
  - Shadow Chancellor Rachel Reeves announces a change of policy on Labour's 2021 pledge of an annual £28bn investment in green industry if the party wins the next election, saying the party must be "responsible" with public finances. She confirms that Labour would instead increase investment each year between 2024 (the expected date of the election) and 2027, when the annual amount would be £28bn.
  - Bambos Charalambous, the Shadow Minister for the Middle East and North Africa, is suspended from the Labour Party following complaints about his conduct.
  - Rhun ap Iorwerth is set to become the next leader of Plaid Cymru after the final two candidates seen as potential rivals in the party's leadership race, Sian Gwenllian and Sioned Williams, issue a joint statement ruling themselves out of the contest.
  - Health Minister Will Quince announces he will step down as a Conservative MP at the next general election.
- 10 June – Nigel Adams becomes the third Conservative MP in quick succession to stand down from Parliament with immediate effect, triggering a by-election.
- 11 June –
  - Energy Secretary Grant Shapps, speaking on Sunday with Laura Kuenssberg, declares that the country "wants to move on" from Boris Johnson and dismisses claims the ex-PM was the victim of a "witch hunt".
  - Police Scotland arrest Scotland's former first minister, Nicola Sturgeon, as part of their ongoing investigation into the SNP's finances. She is subsequently released without charge.
- 12 June –
  - The House of Lords Appointments Commission says that it rejected eight of Boris Johnson's nominations for peers after Sunak accuses Johnson of asking him to intervene in the process, something Johnson rejects.
  - Chris Bryant, chair of the Commons Select Committee of Privileges, describes attacks on the committee's procedures aas "bang out of order".
  - With the findings of the Privileges Committee investigation into Boris Johnson scheduled to be published within days, Johnson submits an eleventh hour letter to the Committee at 23:57 on 12 June.
  - Scotland's first minister, Humza Yousaf, tells BBC News he will not suspend Nicola Sturgeon from the SNP following her arrest.
  - The broadcasting regulator Ofcom announces it is conducting research into public attitudes towards current affairs programmes presented by politicians with a view to a potential change in the rules regarding such shows.
- 13 June –
  - Màiri McAllan, Scotland's Cabinet Secretary for Net Zero and Just Transition, is additionally appointed as minister for transport, replacing Kevin Stewart in the role.
  - Independent councillor Ieuan Williams stands down as deputy leader of Isle of Anglesey County Council after telling a meeting the previous evening that "all Tories should be shot". Apologising for the comment, Williams says he was "angry and emotional" about poverty at the time.
- 15 June –
  - Partygate: A report by MPs concludes that ex-Prime Minister Boris Johnson deliberately misled the Commons over lockdown parties at 10 Downing Street, and would be suspended for 90 days if still an MP. It states that he deliberately misled the House, the committee, impugned the committee and was "complicit in the campaign of abuse and attempted intimidation of the Committee".
  - Lucy Allan, Conservative MP for Telford, announces she will stand down from Parliament at the next general election.
  - Scotland's first minister, Humza Yousaf, concludes that Jenny Gilruth did not break the ministerial code during her time as the country's transport minister. The announcement comes after Scottish Conservatives leader Douglas Ross suggested she had done so by delaying important railways work that cost £1m.
- 16 June –
  - Rhun ap Iorwerth is elected unopposed as the new leader of Plaid Cymru.
  - The Daily Mail announces it has signed up Boris Johnson as a columnist, prompting the House of Commons Advisory Committee on Business Appointments to investigate whether he has breached the Ministerial Code by not consulting them before accepting the role.
  - After several of Johnson's former Conservative colleagues threaten to vote against the Privileges Committee report when it is brought before Parliament, Johnson asks them not to do so.
  - Buckingham Palace announces that Charles III has given Queen Camilla Scotland's highest honour, the Order of the Thistle.
  - The Labour Party selects their candidates for upcoming by-elections; Keir Mather in Selby and Ainsty and Alistair Strathern in Mid Bedfordshire.
  - The Conservatives choose Bedfordshire Police and Crime Commissioner Festus Akinbusoye as their candidate for the by-election in Mid Bedfordshire.
  - Alison McGovern defeats Mick Whitley for the selection for the new Birkenhead constituency.
- 17 June –
  - The 2023 Birthday Honours are announced awarding politicians with honours; Ben Bradshaw gets a knighthood, Jackie Baillie gets a damehood, John Baron and Bob Blackman are both made CBEs, while Conservative former ministers Damian Collins and Heather Wheeler become OBEs.
  - David Warburton, the MP for Somerton and Frome, becomes the fourth Conservative MP in eight days to announce their resignation from the House of Commons, doing so following suspension from the party over allegations of sexual misconduct, and triggering a by-election in his constituency.
- 18 June –
  - Partygate:
    - The Mirror publishes video footage of a party held in December 2020 at Conservative Party Headquarters. Housing Secretary Michael Gove describes the incident as "indefensible".
    - Gove tells Sunday with Laura Kuenssberg that Johnson's 90-day suspension is "not merited" and that he will not vote for it.
- 19 June –
  - Partygate:
    - BBC News reports that it has seen an invitation sent out to 30 people by Ben Mallett, a former aide to Boris Johnson, in which they were invited to "jingle and mingle" at a party held at Conservative Party Headquarters on 14 December 2020, while London was in Tier 2 restrictions.
    - MPs back, by 354 votes to seven, a report finding Boris Johnson deliberately misled the Commons over lockdown parties at Downing Street.
- 20 June –
  - The chancellor, Jeremy Hunt, rules out direct financial support for mortgage holders, over fears it would "make inflation worse, not better".
  - A recall petition opens in the Rutherglen and Hamilton West constituency to determine whether Margaret Ferrier will face a by-election; 10% of eligible voters must sign it to trigger the by-election.
  - SNP MP John Nicolson is cleared of bullying allegations against former Conservative minister Nadine Dorries.
- 21 June – Welsh Conservative Member of the Senedd Tom Giffard gives a speech in the Senedd congratulating Wales for winning the 2023 World Cup of Darts generated by the ChatGPT chatbot.
- 22 June –
  - Defence Secretary Ben Wallace, considered a possible successor to Jens Stoltenberg as Secretary General of NATO when Stoltenberg's term ends in September, rules himself out of the position in an interview with The Economist.
  - MSPs vote 66–44 to approve the Bail and Release from Custody (Scotland) Bill, designed to reduce Scotland's prison population.
- 23 June –
  - Conservative MP Steve Brine, chair of the Commons Health and Social Care Committee, announces his intention to stand down as an MP at the next general election.
  - Research carried out by the Electoral Commission indicates around 14,000 people were prevented from voting in England's May 2023 elections because they did not have suitable photo ID, with unemployed people and those among ethnic minorities being more likely to be turned away.
- 24 June –
  - The UK government holds an emergency COBRA meeting to discuss the Wagner Group rebellion in Russia. Sunak urges both sides to "be responsible and to protect civilians".
  - Addressing a convention in Dundee, Scotland's first minister, Humza Yousaf, says the SNP will use the next general election as a referendum to negotiate independence with the UK government if the party wins a majority in Scotland.
- 26 June – Daniel Korski, a former Downing Street adviser, rejects "in the strongest possible terms" a claim by journalist and author Daisy Goodwin that he groped her during a meeting at Downing Street in 2013.
- 27 June – Virginia Crosbie, the MP for Ynys Môn, apologises for attending a drinks event at Westminster on 8 December 2020 after the Guido Fawkes website reported she was a co-host of the event.
- 28 June –
  - The final proposals for the 2023 Periodic Review of Westminster constituencies are published, and see changes to constituencies in England, Scotland and Wales. The overall number of MPs elected at the next general election will remain at 650, but the number of seats will change from 533 to 543 in England, 40 to 32 in Wales, and 59 to 57 in Scotland. The review, which takes account of changes in population, will also see some prominent MPs, such as Conservative defence secretary Ben Wallace and Labour's Shadow Chancellor Rachel Reeves, lose their seats as they are abolished, requiring them to undergo a fresh selection process for alternative seats.
  - Stewart Hosie, MP for Dundee East and former SNP deputy leader, confirms he will stand down from Parliament at the next general election.
  - Daniel Korski withdraws from the contest to be the Conservative candidate for the 2024 London mayoral election following allegations he groped journalist and author Daisy Goodwin.
  - Robin Millar resigns as a parliamentary aide to Welsh Secretary David TC Davies in order to vote against legislation that makes it compulsory for schools in Northern Ireland to teach all post-primary school children about abortion and birth control. The legislation passes by 373–28.
- 29 June –
  - Commons Privileges Committee investigation into Boris Johnson: The Commons Select Committee of Privileges publishes a 14-page report outlining what it describes as a coordinated campaign by allies of Johnson to interfere in their investigation into him. The report names ten Conservative MPs, including Nadine Dorries, Jacob Rees-Mogg and Priti Patel who it says mounted "vociferous attacks" against the committee.
  - Rwanda Asylum Plan: The plan to deport some asylum seekers to Rwanda is ruled unlawful. In a three-judge decision, the court of appeal overturns a high court decision that previously ruled that Rwanda could be considered a safe third country to send refugees.
  - A Local Government Association survey indicates that one in ten councils in England have had councillors stand down from office due to a legal requirement that council meetings should be held in person. The rule was suspended during the pandemic, but reinstated in May 2021.
  - Conservative MP Lee Anderson faces censure from the Serjeant at Arms of the House of Commons for filming a promotional video for his GB News programme on Parliamentary property without permission.
- 30 June –
  - Zac Goldsmith resigns as Minister of State for Overseas Territories, Commonwealth, Energy, Climate and Environment after he was accused by the Privileges Committee of interfering with their work. Goldsmith said he resigned over a long-standing climate issue, something Sunak contradicted when he said that Goldsmith resigned because he refused to apologise for criticising the Committee investigation into Johnson. Goldsmith later said that was wrong.
  - The Advisory Committee on Business Appointments clears Sue Gray to work for the Labour Party from September 2023.
  - The High Court hears the UK government's legal challenge to the UK COVID-19 Inquiry's demand for full access to Johnson's diaries and WhatsApp messages.
  - The UK government says it will not investigate allegations of groping made against Daniel Korski.
  - Rwanda Asylum Plan: Justine Greening, a former International Development Secretary, warns the UK's deal to deport asylum seekers to Rwanda risks "downgrading" UK foreign policy.

=== July ===
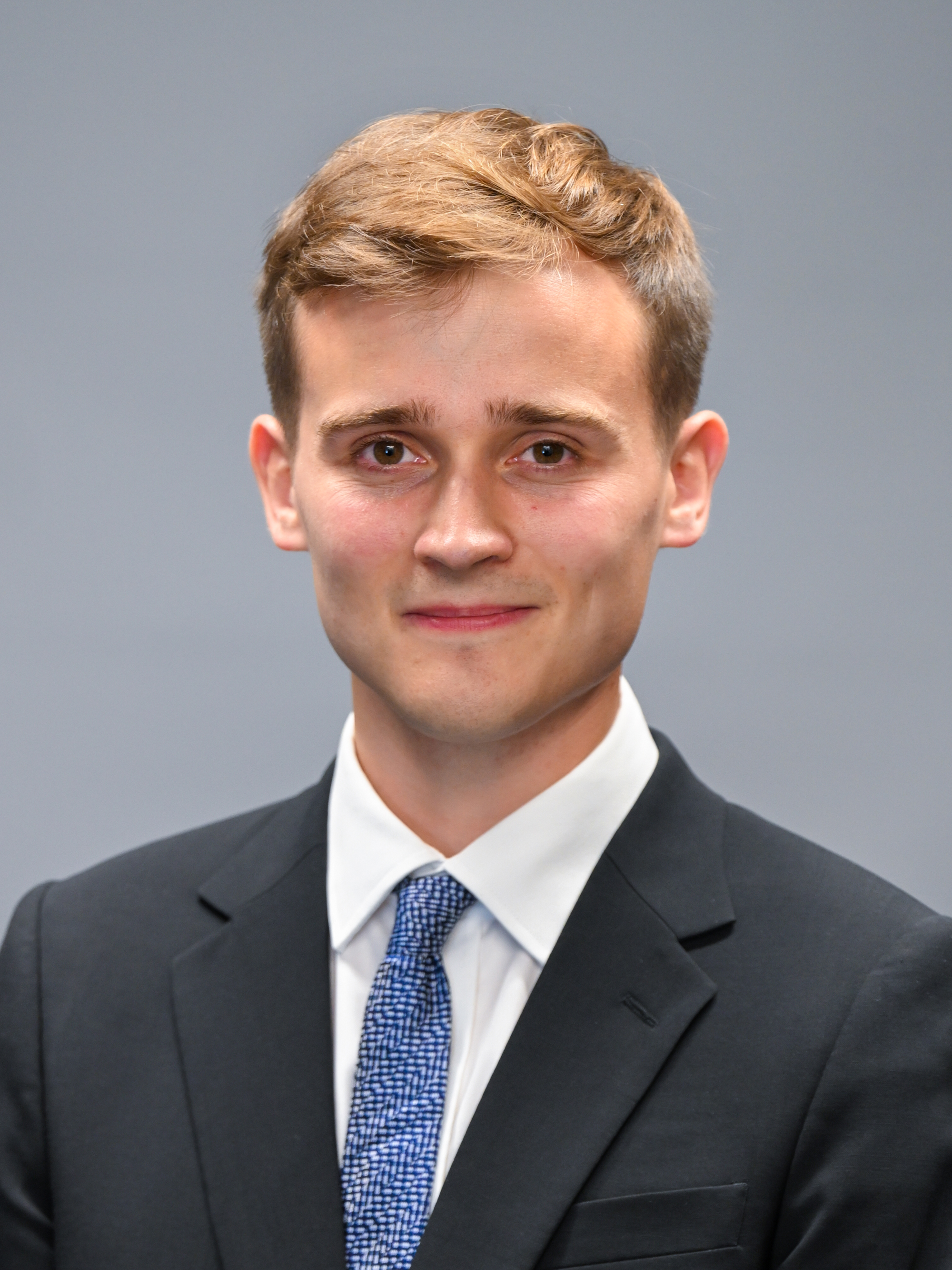
In July 2023, Keir Mather won the 2023 Selby and Ainsty by-election for Labour, becoming the Baby of the House.

- 1 July –
  - Local Government Minister Lee Rowley formally writes to South Cambridgeshire District Council to request they end their trial of a four-day working week "immediately" amid concerns about "value for money". The scheme, launched in January 2023, is scheduled to run until March 2024.
  - First Minister of Scotland Humza Yousaf announces that the SNP has changed the way it records donations after the issue was highlighted by its auditors. Having previously only kept online records of donations under £250, the party will now keep documented records of the donations.
  - Sir Gavin Williamson, MP for South Staffordshire, is chosen as the Conservative candidate for the newly created constituency of Stone, Great Wyrley and Penkridge, which will be contested at the 2024 general election.
- 2 July –
  - The Labour Party announces that a future Labour government will give newly qualified teachers in England a £2,400 payment to stop them leaving the profession.
  - During an appearance on BBC Radio Scotland's The Sunday Show, Scottish Conservative MSP Jamie Greene alleges that he lost his post in the Shadow Cabinet of Douglas Ross for supporting the Scottish Government's controversial Gender Recognition Reform Bill.
- 3 July –
  - The Cabinet Office finds that Sue Gray broke civil service rules by failing to declare that she was in talks with Labour about a job with the party. Labour dismisses the finding as a "political stunt".
  - Members of Orkney Islands Council, a Council area of Scotland, vote 15–6 in favour of investigating alternative methods of government that includes the potential to become a crown dependency of the UK or a self-governing territory of Norway.
  - Illegal Migration Bill: The House of Lords votes to limit the time which children and pregnant women can be held before being deported for entering the UK illegally.
  - A group of Conservative MPs calling themselves the New Conservatives publish a 12-point plan intended to reduce net migration to the UK, and warn Sunak that failure to tackle the issue "risks eroding public trust".
  - Ofcom launches investigations into an episode of Jacob Rees-Mogg's State of the Nation that aired on GB News on 9 May, and an edition of Richard Tice presented by Alex Salmond on TalkTV on 2 April, both of which covered news stories, but were presented by politicians. The State of the Nation investigation will establish whether the edition of the programme, which covered a jury verdict on former US president Donald Trump, complies with broadcast regulations, while the Richard Tice investigation will look at whether the programme was presented with due impartiality. The former received 40 complaints after airing, while the latter received two.
- 4 July –
  - The Metropolitan Police announces it is reopening its investigation into a lockdown party held at Conservative Party Headquarters in December 2020, as well as an event held at Westminster on 8 December 2020.
  - SNP MP Mhairi Black announces she will stand down from Parliament at the next general election.
- 5 July –
  - King Charles III is presented with the Honours of Scotland during a ceremony held at Edinburgh's St Giles Cathedral.
  - SNP MP Angus McNeil is suspended from the party for a week following an argument with the party's chief whip, Brendan O'Hara, after he allegedly threatened O'Hara.
  - Media expert Chris Banatvala, who drew up the UK's broadcasting rules, urges Ofcom to decide whether politicians should be allowed to present programmes on news channels.
  - Six members of Parliamentary staff tell BBC Newsnight that a "predatory culture" still exists in Westminster, with abuses of power by male MPs and senior staffers common.
- 6 July –
  - The Parliamentary Commissioner for Standards recommends that MP Chris Pincher be suspended for eight weeks, following an investigation into groping allegations.
  - The UK government loses a High Court bid to prevent the COVID-19 Inquiry from seeing Boris Johnson's diaries and WhatsApp messages in full.
  - Caroline Nokes, who chairs the House of Commons Women and Equalities Committee, tells the BBC's Newsnight programme she has experienced inappropriate behaviour at Westminster around 30 times since becoming an MP, and that describes what some women working at Westminster have been through as "horrific".
  - The Scottish and UK governments confirm plans to collaborate on new legislation to prevent landlords excluding parents and people on benefits from renting properties.
- 7 July –
  - Christina Rees, a former Shadow Secretary of State for Wales, is prevented from seeking selection as the Labour candidate for the newly created constituency of Neath and Swansea East due to her suspension from Labour over bullying allegations.
  - The Scottish Government urges Westminster to decriminalise the personal possession of all illegal drugs, and puts forward a number of proposals for the managed use of drugs.
  - Ofcom launches an investigation into a GB News campaign that urges the UK government to introduce legislation to stop "Britain becoming a cashless society" following a complaint. The "Don't Kill Cash" petition, which has been signed by more than 166,000 people, potentially breaches Ofcom's rules that require broadcasters to not comment on "matters of political and industrial controversy or current public policy".
- 8 July – It is reported that members of Flintshire County Council are to be given lessons in respect after one of its members called Wales's first minister, Mark Drakeford, "Führer" on Facebook.
- 9 July – US president Joe Biden arrives in the UK for a brief visit ahead of a NATO summit in Lithuania.
- 10 July –
  - US president Joe Biden meets King Charles III at Windsor Castle during a trip to the UK.
  - Daniel Greenberg, the Parliamentary Commissioner for Standards, says that Parliament must improve its complaints system following a number of misconduct allegations by MPs.
  - John McNally, MP for Falkirk, says he will stand down from Parliament at the next election, becoming the seventh SNP MP to do so.
  - The Parliamentary Commissioner for Standards opens an investigation into Conservative MP Lee Anderson for using the roof of his Westminster office to film a promotional video for his GB News show.
  - MPs approve the Privileges Committee report that accused Johnson's allies of running a co-ordinated campaign to interfere with the report into Johnson.
- 11 July –
  - MPs overturn many of the 20 changes the House of Lords made to the Illegal Migration Bill, but the government makes concessions on the detention of children and pregnant women.
  - In the Senedd, Wales's first minister, Mark Drakeford, defends the country's former health minister Vaughan Gething for not reading pandemic paperwork until he prepared for the COVID-19 inquiry, but Andrew RT Davies, leader of the Welsh Conservatives questions how there can be confidence in Gething's current job as Economy Minister.
  - MPs on the Public Bills Committee vote 9–6 against an amendment to the Victims and Prisoners Bill that would remove parental rights from a person convicted of murdering their partner for the duration of their sentence.
- 12 July –
  - Cabinet Secretary Simon Case refers Nadine Dorries to the Conservative Whip following allegations she sent "forceful" messages to officials.
  - Simon Case urges politicians to stop referring to the Civil Service as "the Blob", describing the term "insulting" and "dehumanising".
- 13 July –
  - Illegal Migration Bill: The House of Lords rejects government plans to extend the amount of time migrant children can be held in detention, and also votes to increase protection for people claiming to be the victims of human trafficking.
  - Labour announce plans to reform the Parliamentary standards system if they win the next general election, including levying fines for former ministers who breach lobbying rules.
- 14 July –
  - The High Court of England and Wales gives its approval to legal challenges against the Home Office by Braintree District Council in Essex and West Lindsey District Council in Lincolnshire over plans to use two former airbases in the areas, Weathersfield Airbase and RAF Scampton, to house asylum seekers.
  - A report into UK dentistry published by the Commons Health and Social Care Select Committee concludes that it is "totally unacceptable" that many people do not have access to a dentist, and calls for more to be done to facilitate this.
  - Angus MacNeil is suspended from the SNP after declining an invitation to rejoin the party at Westminster.
- 15 July –
  - Secretary of State for Defence Ben Wallace announces his intention to stand down from the Cabinet at the next reshuffle, and to stand down as an MP at the next general election when his constituency will be abolished because of boundary changes.
  - Angus MacNeil urges the UK government to reopen the Energy Bill Support Scheme Alternative Funding programme, designed to help households that missed out on the £400 worth of financial help given to households in the winter of 2022–23 after it emerged that of the one million households eligible to apply to the scheme only a fraction received any funds.
- 16 July – Kemi Badenoch, the secretary of state for business and trade, formally signs a treaty confirming accession to the Indo-Pacific CPTPP bloc. The deal is forecast to add 0.08% to the UK's economy over ten years.
- 17 July – The Illegal Migration Bill is set to become law after the House of Lords votes not to reinstate time limits on child detention and protections concerning modern slavery.
- 18 July –
  - Philippa Whitford, MP for Central Ayrshire, announces she will stand down from Parliament at the next general election, becoming the eighth SNP MP to do so.
  - Scottish Labour says it will continue to oppose the two-child cap on Universal Credit and Child Tax Credit after UK Labour leader Sir Keir Starmer said he would not abolish the rule without growing the economy.
  - Jamie Driscoll, the North of Tyne Mayor, resigns from the Labour Party after being blocked from standing for the newly created role of North East Mayor.
  - Writing for The Telegraph, former UKIP and Brexit Party leader Nigel Farage claims to have evidence that Coutts bank decided to close his account because his views "do not align" with theirs. The report obtained by Farage is subsequently published in the Daily Mail.
  - Troubles Legacy Bill: MPs vote 292–200 in favour of reinstating the amnesty to those who cooperate with investigations under the new Independent Commission for Reconciliation and Information Recovery (ICRIR).
- 19 July – The Conservative Party have complained to the Evening Standard about their front-page coverage of the party's selection of Susan Hall as its candidate for the 2024 London mayoral election, claiming the coverage is "contemptable".
- 20 July –
  - Parliamentary by-elections are held in Somerton and Frome, Uxbridge and South Ruislip, and Selby and Ainsty.
  - Nigel Farage receives an apology from Dame Alison Rose, the chief executive of NatWest Bank, for "deeply inappropriate" comments made about him in a report on his suitability as a customer at Coutts Bank. The UK government also announces that banks will be required to fully explain their reasons for closing people's accounts.
  - It is reported that former Permanent Secretary to the Treasury Sir Tom Scholar received a £335,000 payment for "loss of office" after he was sacked by Liz Truss when she became prime minister in September 2022.
  - Downing Street criticises the European Union for using the term Las Malvinas, Argentina's name for the Falkland Islands, in an official document.
  - Chris Pincher appeals against his eight-week suspension from Parliament.
  - The Strikes (Minimum Service Levels) Bill is signed into law.
- 21 July –
  - July 2023 by-elections:
    - Uxbridge and South Ruislip: The former seat of ex-PM Boris Johnson is held by the Conservatives, but with a reduced majority of 495 votes. Steve Tuckwell becomes the constituency's MP. The proposed ULEZ expansion by Labour's Sadiq Khan, Mayor of London, is a factor in the result.
    - Selby and Ainsty: Labour takes the formerly safe Conservative seat of Selby and Ainsty. The swing of 23.7% is the largest since 1945. Keir Mather becomes the constituency's new MP, and at 25, the youngest member of parliament and Baby of the House.
    - Somerton and Frome: The Liberal Democrats take Somerton and Frome, overturning a Conservative majority of 29.6%. Sarah Dyke is elected as the constituency's new MP.
- 23 July – The Cabinet Office announces the launch of the Humanitarian Medal for emergency workers and humanitarian relief teams, such as charities, service personnel and health workers.
- 24 July –
  - Trudy Harrison, MP for Copeland, announces she will not stand for Parliament at the next election.
  - Charlotte Owen, a former adviser to Boris Johnson, joins the House of Lords as its youngest life peer at the age of 30, becoming Baroness Owen of Alderley Edge. Her appointment was announced on 12 July.
  - The Cabinet Office confirms that controversial guidance used to vet potential speakers for government organised events has been withdrawn.
- 25 July –
  - Dame Alison Rose says she was the source of an inaccurate BBC news report about Nigel Farage's Coutts bank account after discussing the matter with BBC business editor Simon Jack, something she describes as a "serious error of judgement". She subsequently resigns from her post early the next day.
  - Labour abandons proposals to allow people to legally change their sex without a medical diagnosis. This policy is in juxtaposition to Scottish Labour which confirms it still supports removing the requirement.
  - The Culture, Media and Sport Committee writes to The Sun and the BBC to gain a better understanding of their handling of allegations made against BBC newsreader Huw Edwards.
- 27 July – First Minister of Scotland Humza Yousaf unveils a new Scottish Government paper on independence that includes plans for Scottish citizenship and passports.
- 28 July – Gina Miller, leader of the True and Fair Party, reveals she was told one of the party's bank accounts would be close without explanation by Monzo. The bank has since confirmed it does now allow accounts for political parties.
- 30 July – Nigel Farage launches AccountClosed.org, a website he says will stand up for people who have been refused bank accounts.
- 31 July –
  - Nick Timothy is selected as the Conservative Party candidate for the West Suffolk constituency, the seat currently occupied by former Health Secretary Matt Hancock.
  - The 2023 Rutherglen and Hamilton West recall petition closes. A by-election is triggered after the petition to remove Margaret Ferrier from office is signed by 11,896 of the 81,124 eligible constituents, passing the required 10% threshold.

=== August ===
- 1 August – The Department for Business and Trade announces that the CE marking will continue to be recognised on products sold in the UK, rather than being replaced by a post-Brexit British logo, which was scheduled to happen in 2024.
- 2 August –
  - Robin Harper, who in 1999 became the first Green parliamentarian after he was elected to the Scottish Parliament, resigns his life membership of the Scottish Greens claiming the party has "lost the plot".
  - Gwent Police says it is "reviewing" the content of a leaflet sent to constituents by Conservative MP David TC Davies discussing traveller sites in the area. They subsequently announce Davies will face no action over the leaflet.
- 3 August – Five people are arrested after environmental protesters from Greenpeace climb on the roof of the North Yorkshire home of Rishi Sunak in protest at the Prime Minister's decision to award 100 new oil contracts.
- 4 August –
  - Chancellor Jeremy Hunt instructs the Financial Conduct Authority to speed up their investigation into whether people have had their bank accounts closed because of their political views.
  - Comedian Eddie Izzard announces plans to stand in one of Brighton's constituencies at the next general election.
  - A royal spokesman confirms there will be no official public events to mark the first anniversary of the death of Elizabeth II.
  - Edinburgh's Court of Session rejects an attempt by the Scottish Government to delay the hearing into its legal challenge against Westminster's decision to block the Gender Recognition Reform (Scotland) Bill. The Scottish Government had wanted it delayed until after a separate hearing into determining the definition of a woman.
  - The Conservatives lose East Sussex County Council to no overall control for the first time since 2017 following a council by-election.
- 5 August – Former Labour leader Jeremy Corbyn says he will consider running as an Independent in the 2024 London mayoral election.
- 7 August –
  - Ofcom launches investigations into GB News programmes presented by MPs Jacob Rees-Mogg, Philip Davies and Esther McVey.
  - The UK government cut ties with Greenpeace after a protest at the prime minister's home at Kirby Sigston Manor.
- 8 August – The Electoral Commission warns people to look out for unauthorised use of their data after revealing it was the victim of a "complex cyber-attack" in August 2021, which was not discovered until October 2022.
- 9 August –
  - First Minister of Wales Mark Drakeford confirms he will leave the Senedd at the 2026 Senedd election; he is expected to stand down as first minister before then.
  - Drakeford asks ministers to make cuts to public services in Wales as inflation and public sector pay place constraints on the Welsh Government's budget.
- 10 August – Stuart Andrew, MP for Pudsey, confirms he will not stand again for parliament at the next general election.
- 11 August –
  - Ministry of Defence data indicates Rishi Sunak has taken more domestic flights during his time as prime minister than his three predecessors did during their terms in office.
  - Theresa Villiers, a former secretary of state for the environment, apologises after revealing that she failed to declare £70,000 of shares in Shell during her time in the role.
  - Rob Blackie is announced as the Liberal Democrat candidate for the 2024 London mayoral election.
  - Angus McNeil, MP for the Western Isles, is expelled from the SNP following his disagreement with the party's Chief Whip at Westminster.
- 13 August – Following calls from some senior SNP figures for a review, Ian Blackford, the SNP's former leader at Westminster, confirms the SNP–Green agreement at Holyrood will remain in place until 2026.
- 15 August – Global Media & Entertainment have rejected an Alba Party poster depicting Rishi Sunday as a vampire feeding off Scottish oil because it "slandered" the prime minister.
- 17 August – The Saudi Arabian embassy in the UK announces that Crown Prince Mohammed bin Salman has been invited to visit the UK, although Downing Street says there are no plans in the prime minister's diary for a visit.
- 18 August –
  - Foreign Secretary James Cleverly is to travel to Australia to attend the 2023 FIFA Women's World Cup Final as England take on Spain.
  - Dafydd Elis-Thomas, a former leader of Plaid Cymru who left the party in 2016 after criticising it, has applied to rejoin.
- 23 August – Murray Foote is appointed as the SNP's new chief executive, replacing Peter Murrell.
- 24 August – The Parliamentary Commissioner for Standards rules that Rishi Sunak failed to declare his wife's financial interests in a childminding business correctly.
- 25 August – Following a review of MPs severance pay, the Independent Parliamentary Standards Authority announces the money paid to MPs leaving Parliament at the next election will double to £19,000, and will be paid over four months rather than two.
- 26 August – Conservative MP Nadine Dorries resigns her Parliamentary seat two months after originally saying she would do so, accusing Prime Minister Rishi Sunak of abandoning "the fundamental principles of Conservatism" and that "history will not judge [him] kindly".
- 27 August – Shadow Chancellor Rachel Reeves rules out any form of a wealth tax if Labour wins the next general election, saying that any extra funding for public services must come about as a result of economic growth.
- 29 August –
  - The UK government announces plans to scrap EU-era water pollution restrictions on housing development in order to facilitate the building of more houses.
  - Monmouthshire county councillor Sara Burch resigns from her cabinet post following a post on Twitter in which she likened the actions of the secretary of state for Wales to events in the Romani Holocaust after accusing him of "whipping up anti-traveller feeling".
- 30 August –
  - Foreign Secretary James Cleverly meets China's vice president Han Zheng for talks at the Great Hall of the People in Beijing.
  - Following a number of high-profile criminal trials during which convicted defendants have refused to attend their sentencing hearings, Prime Minister Rishi Sunak announces plans to introduce legislation that will compel convicted criminals to attend their sentencing hearings, by force if necessary, or face more time in prison.
  - The UK government announces plans to reinstate EU equal pay laws that were scrapped in a post-Brexit purge of EU legislation.
- 31 August –
  - Rishi Sunak carries out a mini-cabinet reshuffle, promoting Grant Shapps to defence secretary to replace Ben Wallace who plans to stand down from Parliament at the next election. Claire Coutinho replaces Shapps as energy secretary, and at 38, becomes the youngest member of Sunak's cabinet.
  - The Labour Party suspends its entire Leicester East constituency party while the National Executive Committee investigates concerns over its operation.
  - Former Conservative MP Antoinette Sandbach has asked that her name be removed from a 2021 TEDx Talk that connects her to a slave owner, arguing there is no public interest in identifying her as his descendant.

=== September ===
- 1 September – Amber de Botton announces her resignation as Downing Street Director of Communications less than a year after her appointment to the role. She is replaced by Nerissa Chesterfield, who is promoted from the post of Downing Street Press Secretary.
- 3 September –
  - Chancellor Jeremy Hunt says the UK government will "spend what it takes" to put right defective concrete in schools, but concedes that structural problems could be identified in more schools and other public buildings.
  - Neil Gray, Scotland's Wellbeing and Economy Secretary, says there is no immediate risk to schools in Scotland from defective concrete.
- 4 September –
  - Opposition leader Sir Keir Starmer performs a shadow cabinet reshuffle, as MPs return to Westminster after the summer break. This includes Angela Rayner becoming both Shadow Levelling Up Secretary and Shadow Deputy Prime Minister.
  - Leader of the Scottish National Party in the House of Commons Stephen Flynn reshuffles his frontbench.
  - Education Secretary Gillian Keegan apologises for her use of offensive language after she is recorded swearing following an appearance on ITV News to discuss the crisis over defective concrete in schools.
  - Former minister Gavin Williamson is told to apologise for sending bullying text messages to a colleague following the publication of the findings of an independent panel of MPs appointed by Parliament to investigate the matter.
  - Christopher Pincher, MP for Tamworth, loses his appeal against an eight-week suspension from Parliament over an incident in which he drunkenly groped a colleague.
- 5 September –
  - Steve Tuckwell, Sarah Dyke and Keir Mather are sworn in as MPs following the summer break.
  - Former SNP MP Natalie McGarry is ordered to pay £66 for embezzling £25,000 from the SNP and a pro-independence group.
  - First Minister of Scotland Humza Yousaf outlines the programme for government legislation for the year ahead, including improvements to childcare, an extra £1bn for social security and pay improvements for social care staff. There are also plans to ban disposable vapes over environmental concerns.
  - Home Secretary Suella Braverman announces that Russia's mercenary Wagner Group is to be prescribed as a terrorist organisation.
- 6 September –
  - Sir Chris Bryant is appointed to the shadow cabinet as Shadow Minister for the Creative and Digital.
  - The Opposition Labour Party unsuccessfully attempts to force a Parliamentary vote that would force the government to publish documents relating to school funding while Sunak was chancellor.
  - Nicola Sturgeon makes her first speech in the Scottish Parliament following her arrest in June.
- 7 September –
  - The UK rejoins the EU's Horizon Europe scheme, allowing UK scientists and institutions to apply for money from the £81b fund.
  - Justice Secretary Alex Chalk announces an independent inquiry into the escape of Daniel Khalife from Wandsworth Prison. The inquiry will have two areas of focus – a review of the "placement and categorisation" of all inmates at Wandsworth, and an investigation of all people in custody currently charged with terror offences.
  - Christopher Pincher resigns his Parliamentary seat, triggering a by-election.
  - Conservative MP Marcus Fysh is reprimanded by the Parliamentary Standards Committee after speaking to the media regarding a now-concluded investigation by the Parliamentary Commissioner, and ordered to apologise to the House of Commons.
- 8 September –
  - Prime Minister Rishi Sunak arrives in New Delhi for the G20 summit.
  - A government auction for renewable energy projects ends without any new contracts being awarded for offshore wind farms after developers said they were too expensive. Contracts for onshore wind, solar energy and tidal projects are awarded though.
  - Labour suspends its leadership team in the Bolton North East constituency following a disagreement over who will represent the party at the next general election. An election campaign will be established by an outside convener.
  - The Conservatives defend accepting a £350,000 donation from Sandy Chadha, chief executive of Supreme 8 Limited, who is also chief executive of Supreme PLC, a company accused by the Labour Party of marketing vapes to children.
- 10 September –
  - The Sunday Times reports that two men have been arrested under the Official Secrets Act, including a researcher in the UK Parliament accused of spying for China.
  - The Trades Union Congress says that it will report the UK government to the International Labour Organization over the Strikes (Minimum Service Levels) Act, which will make it mandatory for striking workers to provide a minimum service during industrial action.
- 11 September –
  - In a statement to Parliament, Sunak tells MPs he "will not accept" Chinese interference in UK democracy.
  - Seven Sheffield Labour councillors are suspended by the national Labour party after refusing to vote with the rest of the party.
- 12 September –
  - MPs vote 404–36 to reclassify nitrous oxide as a Class C drug.
  - Reinforced autoclaved aerated concrete is found at the Palace of Westminster, but is said to pose no immediate risk.
- 13 September –
  - Alister Jack, the secretary of state for Scotland, confirms the UK government will not block Scottish Government plans for a drug consumption room pilot scheme in Scotland.
  - Tobias Ellwood resigns as chair of the Defence Select Committee after posting a video online in support of the Taliban earlier in the year.
  - UK government plans to relax restrictions on water pollution to encourage housebuilding in England are defeated in the House of Lords.
  - A survey by the Local Government Information Unit has highlighted concerns that Voter ID could cause "serious disruption" if implemented at the next general election.
  - Two councillors on Sunderland City Council resign from the opposition Liberal Democrat Party and join the controlling Labour Party. These resignations mean the Liberal Democrat Party lose their status as the opposition party, moving to third behind the Conservatives.
- 14 September –
  - Responding to an Intelligence and Security Select Committee report criticising the UK government's China strategy, Sunak says he is "acutely aware of the particular threat to our open and democratic way of life" posed by China.
  - The Parliamentary Standards Committee finds that Sunak broke the MPs code of conduct when Downing Street commented on their investigation into his wife's failure to properly declare her financial interest in a childminding company before details had been made public.
- 15 September –
  - The UK government formally prescribes the Wagner Group as a terrorist organisation.
  - Stephen Hammond, MP for Wimbledon, announces he will not stand for Parliament at the next general election.
- 18 September –
  - The BBC documentary series State of Chaos is told that senior Whitehall officials raised concerns with Buckingham Palace about Boris Johnson's conduct during the pandemic, and suggested the Queen raise the matter with him during their weekly private audience.
  - Conservative MP Dehenna Davison resigns as a levelling up minister, saying "chronic migraines" have made it "impossible" to do her job. She is replaced by Jacob Young.
  - A year on from her controversial budget, former prime minister Liz Truss gives a speech in which she attempts to defend the policies she tried to enact, acknowledging she tried to introduce them too fast but blaming the "political and economic establishment" and "institutional bureaucracy" for their failure.
  - Figures released by the Welsh Government indicate that plans to bring an extra 36 members to the Senedd could cost an extra £17.8m on top of the present cost of running the legislature.
- 19 September –
  - The UK government announces that commissioners will be appointed to oversee the running of Birmingham City Council following its recent financial troubles.
  - The Scottish Government begins its legal challenge against Westminster over the UK government's decision to block the controversial Gender Recognition Reform (Scotland) Bill.
  - The UK government is criticised by the National Audit Office (NAO) over its reasoning behind the decision to use public funds to pay for Boris Johnson's Partygate legal fees, describing it as not "wholly persuasive".
  - The Online Safety Bill is passed by the House of Lords.
  - The Home Office announces it is disbanding the team established in 2018 to deal with Windrush cases.
  - Labour leader Keir Starmer holds a meeting with French president Emmanuel Macron, which he describes as "very constructive and positive".
  - In a series of interviews with BBC Local Radio, Liberal Democrat leader Sir Ed Davey rules out an electoral deal with the Labour Party for the next general election.
  - A petition on the gov.wales website opposing Wales's 20 mph speed limit has received over 177,000 signatures since its launch, and will be considered by the Senedd Petitions Committee for debate as it has passed the 10,000 signatures required to be considered for debate.
- 20 September –
  - Sunak announces a major rethink of the UK government's strategy to achieve net zero carbon output in the UK by 2050, including a delay in banning the sale of new petrol and diesel cars from 2030 to 2035.
  - David Jones, a former secretary of state for Wales, announces he is to retire from Parliament at the next general election.
  - The family of Ken Livingstone announce that the 78-year-old former mayor of London has been diagnosed with Alzheimer's disease.
  - King Charles III and Queen Camilla begin a three-day state visit to France, rescheduled from a planned visit in March which had to be cancelled due to civil unrest.
- 21 September –
  - Charles III addresses the French Senate during his state visit to France.
  - The UK government says that no action will be taken against Boris Johnson after he was found to have made a "clear breach" of rules governing jobs for ex-ministers.
  - John Bercow, the former Speaker of the House of Commons, is to appear in the next series of The Traitors US.
- 22 September –
  - Speaking to LBC ahead of the 2023 autumn statement, Chancellor Jeremy Hunt says it would be "virtually impossible" to introduce tax cuts until the state of the UK economy has improved.
  - The Home Office is ordered to stop work to convert the former RAF Scampton into an asylum centre by West Lindsey District Council over a potential breach of planning laws.
  - Conservative MP Brandon Lewis has claimed that people working for him have struggled to secure mortgages because banks regard them as politically exposed persons.
- 23 September –
  - A task force to accelerate home insulation and upgrades to domestic boilers is scrapped by the UK government.
  - Former prime minister Boris Johnson warns Sunak against building what he describes as a "mutilated" version of HS2 after reports the Birmingham to Manchester leg of the scheme could be scrapped due to spiralling costs.
- 24 September –
  - Home Secretary Suella Braverman orders a review into armed policing, after dozens of firearms officers hand in their weapons, following concerns over a police officer charged with murdering 24-year-old Chris Kaba.
  - Former secretary of state for transport Grant Shapps tells the BBC it would be "crazy" not to review HS2 plans amid spiralling costs.
- 25 September –
  - Olympic rower James Cracknell is chosen as the Conservative Party candidate for Colchester at the next general election following William Quince's decision to stand down from Parliament.
  - Mayor of Greater Manchester Andy Burnham says that scrapping the HS2 rail link between Birmingham and Manchester risks "ripping the heart" out of plans to improve rail services across northern England.
  - At their annual party conference, members of the Liberal Democrats vote to reject proposals by the party leadership to abandon their housebuilding target of 380,000 properties per year.
- 26 September –
  - Home Secretary Suella Braverman tells a US think tank the 1951 Refugees Convention is no longer fit for the modern age, and that being discriminated against for being gay or female should not be enough to qualify for refugee status. The United Nations High Commission for Refugees rejects the comments.
  - Giving his keynote speech at the Liberal Democrats party conference in Bournemouth, Sir Ed Davey calls for a new legal right to begin treatment for cancer within two months of referral in England.
  - Alok Sharma, MP for Reading West, announces he will not stand for parliament again at the next general election.
  - First Minister of Wales Mark Drakeford tells the Senedd he has received threats to his personal safety over Wales's 20 mph speed limit, while police confirm they are investigating "reports of malicious communications" sent to Drakeford.
  - The Court of Appeal rejects former MP Jared O'Mara's appeal against a four-year sentence for fraud.
- 27 September – Former SNP minister Fergus Ewing is suspended from the party for a week after voting against the Scottish Government in a no confidence vote.
- 29 September –
  - Around a dozen Conservative MPs, including some ministers, are reported to have complained to the party's chief whip about Suella Braverman's speech on immigration and refugees.
  - Ahead of the broadcast of an interview with Conservative home secretary Suella Braverman conducted by Conservative deputy chair and GB News presenter Lee Anderson, the chief executive of Ofcom, Melanie Dawes, says there are no present rules to prevent GB News using Anderson to interview Braverman.
  - Colwyn Bay independent councillor Tom Maclean is cautioned by the Public Services Ombudsman for Wales after sharing a fake social media post featuring an image of Norwegian mass killer Anders Breivik. Maclean had claimed not to know the picture was of Breivik and deleted it as soon as his actions came to light.
- 30 September – Richard Walker, the chief executive of Iceland who had plans to stand as a Conservative MP, leaves the party, branding it "out of touch".

=== October ===
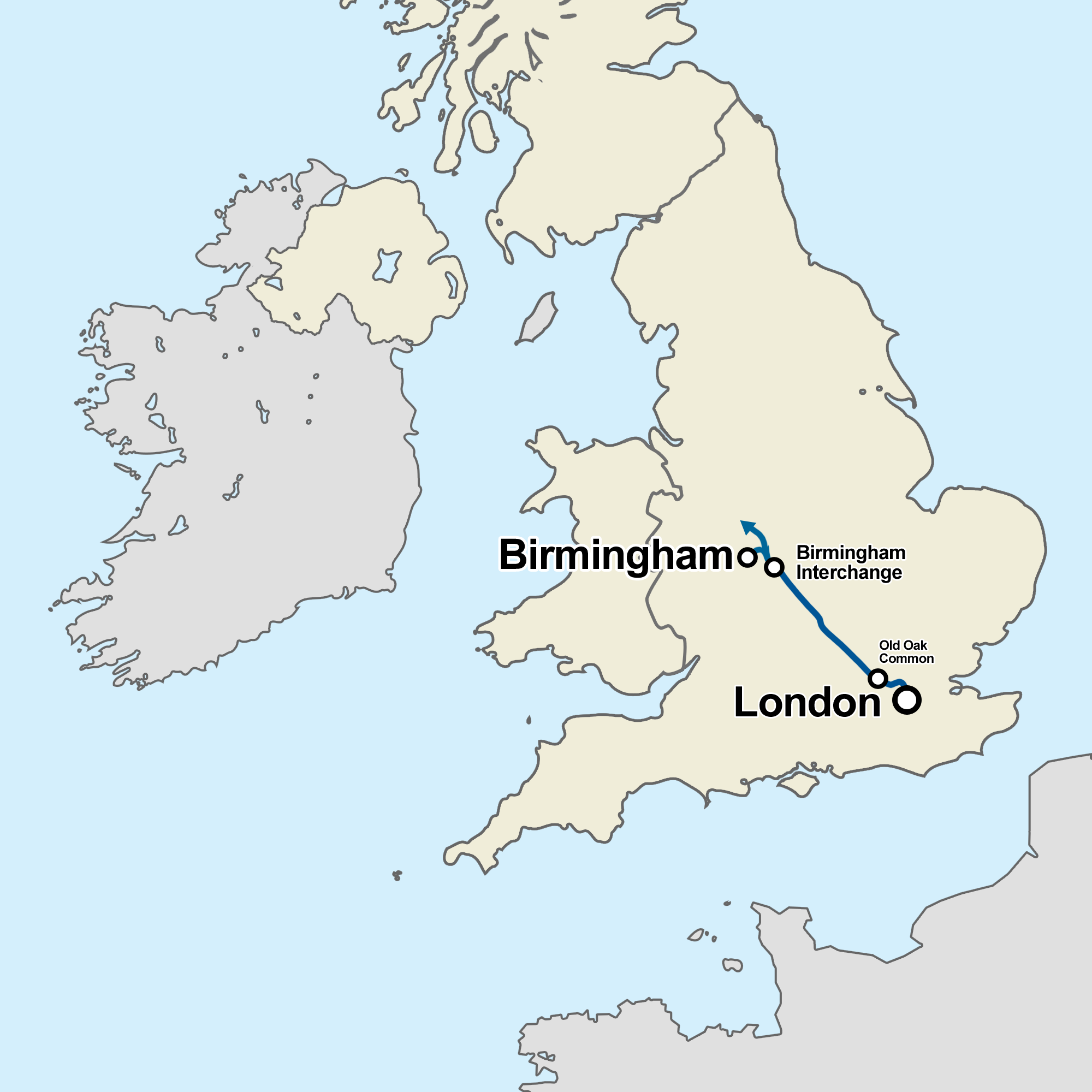
Rishi Sunak confirmed in October 2023 that the northern portion of High Speed 2 (HS2) linking Birmingham to Manchester will be axed.

- 1 October – Speaking to BBC One's Sunday with Laura Kuenssberg, Prime Minister Rishi Sunak says that he would like to cut taxes before the next election, but does not commit to doing so. He also declines to confirm whether or not the Birmingham to Manchester leg of the High Speed 2 rail link will be scrapped.
- 3 October –
  - Home Secretary Suella Braverman addresses the Conservative Party Conference and claims a "hurricane" of migrants are coming to the UK.
  - London Assembly chair Andrew Boff is ejected from the Conservative Party Conference after heckling Braverman during her speech.
- 4 October
  - Rishi Sunak confirms that the West Midlands to Manchester portion of the High Speed 2 (HS2) rail link will be axed, which will free up £36bn to be spent on new transport projects in the North and Midlands. He also confirms that the southern portion of the line will run all the way from Birmingham to Euston, not just Old Oak Common as earlier reports had speculated.
  - Sunak proposes that the age at which people can buy cigarettes and tobacco should rise by one year every year, so that eventually no-one can buy them, emulating a similar scheme announced recently in New Zealand.
  - Sunak confirms plans to replace A Levels and T Levels in England with a new qualification called the Advanced British Standard.
- 5 October –
  - Labour's Michael Shanks wins the Rutherglen and Hamilton West by-election.
  - Ahead of her party's annual conference, Carla Denyer, co-leader of the Green Party of England and Wales, tells the BBC that winning four seats at the next general election is "absolutely realistic".
- 6 October –
  - At a summit of European leaders in Spain, Sunak calls for greater co-operation in dealing with migration.
  - Dale Vince, a major donor to the Labour Party, says he will no longer fund Just Stop Oil and describes further protests from the group as being "counterproductive".
  - Chris Grayling, MP for Epsom and Ewell and a former secretary of state for transport, announces he will stand down from Parliament at the next election following a prostate cancer diagnosis.
  - The UK government orders an inquiry after the Department for Education miscalculated the schools budget for England for the 2023–24 academic year, forcing a planned 2.7% had to be revised to 1.9%.
- 8 October – Marina Wheeler, an employment lawyer and the former wife of Prime Minister Boris Johnson, has been appointed as the Labour Party's adviser on protecting women against workplace harassment.
- 9 October –
  - Sunak chairs an emergency COBRA meeting to discuss the escalating situation in Israel, and pledges further support for the country.
  - Shadow Chancellor Rachel Reeves delivers her keynote speech to the Labour Party Conference, promising to usher in "an era of economic security" by cutting waste and driving growth.
  - The Supreme Court begins a hearing as the UK government appeals against the Court of Appeal's block on sending asylum seekers to Rwanda.
- 10 October –
  - Keir Starmer delivers his keynote speech to the Labour Party Conference, promising to build 1.5 million new homes, make reforms to the NHS and education, and to deliver a "decade of renewal under Labour". The speech is slightly delayed by a protester who throws glitter at Starmer.
  - Labour suspends Newport City Councilor Miqdad Al-Nuaimi while it investigates posts he made on social media about Israeli security policy in Gaza.
- 12 October –
  - Lisa Cameron, the MP for East Kilbride, Strathaven and Lesmahagow, announces her defection from the SNP to the Conservatives, blaming a "toxic" culture in the SNP Parliamentary Party for her decision.
  - Aberdeen City Councillor Kairin van Sweeden refers herself to the Standards Commission after describing a fellow councillor who was born in Sri Lanka as a "New Scot" during a council meeting.
  - Senedd Presiding Officer Elin Jones refuses a request from Conservative leader Andrew RT Davies to fly the Flag of Israel outside the Senedd building, saying it should not be flown while both Israelis and Palestinians are suffering.
- 13 October –
  - WhatsApp messages exchanged between senior Downing Street officials during the pandemic are read to the COVID-19 Inquiry, and show Downing Street Permanent Secretary and later Cabinet Office Secretary Simon Case expressing concern at the influence of Carrie Symonds, who was at the time Boris Johnson's partner.
  - Police confirm that 24 fines will be issued for breaches of COVID-19 rules in regard to a party held at Conservative Party HQ in December 2020 for those involved in Shaun Bailey's campaign to become London Mayor.
- 14 October –
  - Scottish Green MSP Maggie Chapman says she regrets the "upset and anger" caused by her social media post in which she described the Hamas attack on Israel as "decolonisation" rather than "terrorism". She has since deleted the post.
  - Former SNP MP Lisa Cameron claims she and her family have had to go into hiding since she switched to the Conservatives after receiving threats of violence.
  - Crispin Blunt, the MP for Reigate, co-director of the International Centre of Justice for Palestinians, announced the group's intention to prosecute UK government leaders for "aiding and abetting war crimes in Gaza" amid the Gaza war, warning his colleagues in Westminster of the peril of guilt through complicity.
- 15 October – First Minister of Scotland Humza Yousaf signals a change in his party's Scottish independence strategy, now saying that an SNP win in a majority of Scotland's Westminster seats would give the party a mandate to begin independence negotiations with the Westminster Government.
- 16 October – Parliament's Independent Expert Panel recommends Conservative MP Peter Bone face a six-week suspension from the House of Commons after upholding complaints of bullying against him.
- 17 October –
  - Peter Bone is suspended by the Parliamentary Conservative Party after allegations of bullying were upheld against him.
  - Humza Yousaf announces a freeze on council tax for Scottish households during his closing speech at the SNP Party Conference.
  - A report by the Independent Complaints and Grievance Scheme concludes that a culture of drinking is fuelling inappropriate behaviour in Westminster.
- 18 October –
  - Addressing the City of London Lord Mayor and representatives at Mansion House, Charles III calls for religious tolerance and mutual respect, against the background of "international turmoil" in Israel and Gaza.
  - Harriet Harman is elected as chair of the Commons Select Committee on Standards, replacing Sir Chris Bryant following his appointment to the Shadow Cabinet.
- 19 October –
  - Prime Minister Rishi Sunak begins a two-day visit to Israel as part of diplomatic efforts to help prevent the Israel-Gaza war escalating into a wider Middle East conflict. Following a meeting with Israeli prime minister Benjamin Netanyahu, Sunak says he will stand with Israel "in solidarity".
  - Labour win two by-elections in Mid Bedfordshire and Tamworth, won by Alistair Strathern and Sarah Edwards respectively.
- 20 October –
  - 2023 Mid Bedfordshire by-election: Labour MP Alistair Strathern wins the constituency of Mid Bedfordshire, with the Conservatives' share of the vote falling by 28.7%, one of the largest swings of the post-war era.
  - 2023 Tamworth by-election: Labour MP Sarah Edwards wins the constituency of Tamworth, with the Conservatives' share of the vote falling by 25.6%.
  - Sunak meets Palestinian Authority leader Mahmoud Abbas in Egypt, where they jointly condemn Hamas's attacks on Israel. Sunak also "expressed his deep condolences" for civilian deaths in Gaza.
  - MPs approve the Worker Protection Bill, designed to give women better protection against sexual harassment in the workplace.
  - the Labour Party loses control of the Oxford City Council after 9 Labour councillors resigned the party in protest at Keir Starmer's refusal to call for a ceasefire in the 2023 Gaza war.
- 22 October –
  - Robert Jenrick, he Minister of State for Immigration, tells the BBC the Sunak government will consider tax cuts if it meets the target of halving inflation by the end of the year.
  - Downing Street announces that Cabinet Secretary Simon Case is to take time off due to a private medical matter; he is expected to return in a few weeks.
- 23 October –
  - Sunak tells parliament the UK has judged the al-Ahli Arab Hospital explosion, which occurred on 17 October, was likely caused by "a missile, or part of one" fired from "within Gaza".
  - Ofcom finds GB News breached its regulations on impartiality during a programme which aired on 16 June. Former Brexit Party MEP Martin Daubney was standing in for Laurence Fox when he interviewed Reform Party leader Richard Tice and discussed immigration. Ofcom finds Tice was not "sufficiently challenged" on his views and "the limited alternative views presented were dismissed". However, Ofcom decides that Lee Anderson's interview with Home Secretary Suella Braverman did not breach their impartiality rules as it was a current affairs programme.
- 24 October – Anas Sarwar, the leader of Scottish Labour, accuses Israel of a "clear breach" of international law in Gaza and says there is "no justification for the withholding of essential supplies" from the people of Gaza. His comments come after a number of Scottish Labour resignations by officials who disagree with Keir Starmer's stance on the conflict.
- 25 October –
  - MPs vote to suspend Peter Bone from the House of Commons for six weeks, triggering a recall petition in his constituency.
  - Sir Keir Starmer meets with Muslim Labour MPs as tension grows over the party's stance on the Israel–Hamas conflict and after 150 Muslim councillors wrote to him urging him to call for an immediate ceasefire in the Middle East.
  - The Information Commissioner's Office finds that Dame Alison Rose, the former chief of NatWest, breached Nigel Farage's privacy rights when she shared information about his banking with a BBC journalist.
  - BBC Director General Tim Davie attends a meeting with Conservative MPs, where there is a heated discussion about the BBC's decision not to describe Hamas as a terrorist organisation in its news reports of the Israel–Gaza conflict.
- 26 October –
  - Parliament is prorogued by order of the King in preparation for the State Opening on 7 November, the first time that Parliament has been prorogued by a king since 1951.
  - Crispin Blunt, the MP for Reigate, is suspended from the Conservative Party after he confirms he has been arrested and questioned by police over allegations of rape and possession of controlled substances.
- 27 October –
  - GB News have hired former prime minister Boris Johnson to present a series "showcasing the power of Britain around the world"; he will also help to provide coverage of the next UK and US elections.
  - Labour Mayor of London Sadiq Khan, Mayor of Greater Manchester Andy Burnham, and Scottish Labour leader Anas Sarwar break with the stance of Labour's leader, Sir Keir Starmer, on the Israel–Gaza conflict by calling for a ceasefire in Gaza.
  - Scotland's former Health Secretary Alex Neil calls for an urgent review of the use of WhatsApp by government following revelations that National Clinical Director Jason Leitch deleted messages on a daily basis during the pandemic; he also says that many government ministers did not understand the rules for using the app.
  - NatWest says there were "serious failings" over its treatment of Nigel Farage.
- 28 October – Ash Regan, who stood as a candidate in the 2023 SNP leadership election, defects to the Alba Party after becoming disillusioned with what she describes as the SNP's "wavering commitment" to Scottish independence.
  - 29 October – The leader of the Conservatives on Bolton Borough Council Martyn Cox writes to Prime Minister Rishi Sunak calling for a ceasefire in the Gaza war.
- 30 October –
  - Downing Street confirms that Paul Bristow has been sacked as a ministerial aide after calling for a ceasefire in Gaza, something Downing Street describes as comments that "were not consistent with the principles of collective responsibility".
  - Mark Drakeford, First Minister of Wales and leader of Welsh Labour, echoes Labour leader Sir Keir Starmer's call for a humanitarian pause in the Gaza conflict to allow aid in to the region. His comments come after 12 of his backbenchers in the Senedd signed a petition calling for a ceasefire.
  - Labour suspends Andy McDonald, the MP for Middlesbrough, from the Parliamentary Labour Party following "deeply offensive" comments made by him in a speech at a pro-Palestinian rally, during which he used the phrase "between the river and the sea", which critics argue called for the destruction of Israel.
  - Aphra Brandreth, daughter of Gyles Brandreth, is chosen as the Conservative candidate for the newly created constituency of Chester South and Eddisbury, which contains part of the constituency represented by Gyles Brandreth during the 1990s.
  - The Electoral Commission rejects an application to register the Party of Islam as a new political party because it did not define its constitution or structure clearly enough.

=== November ===
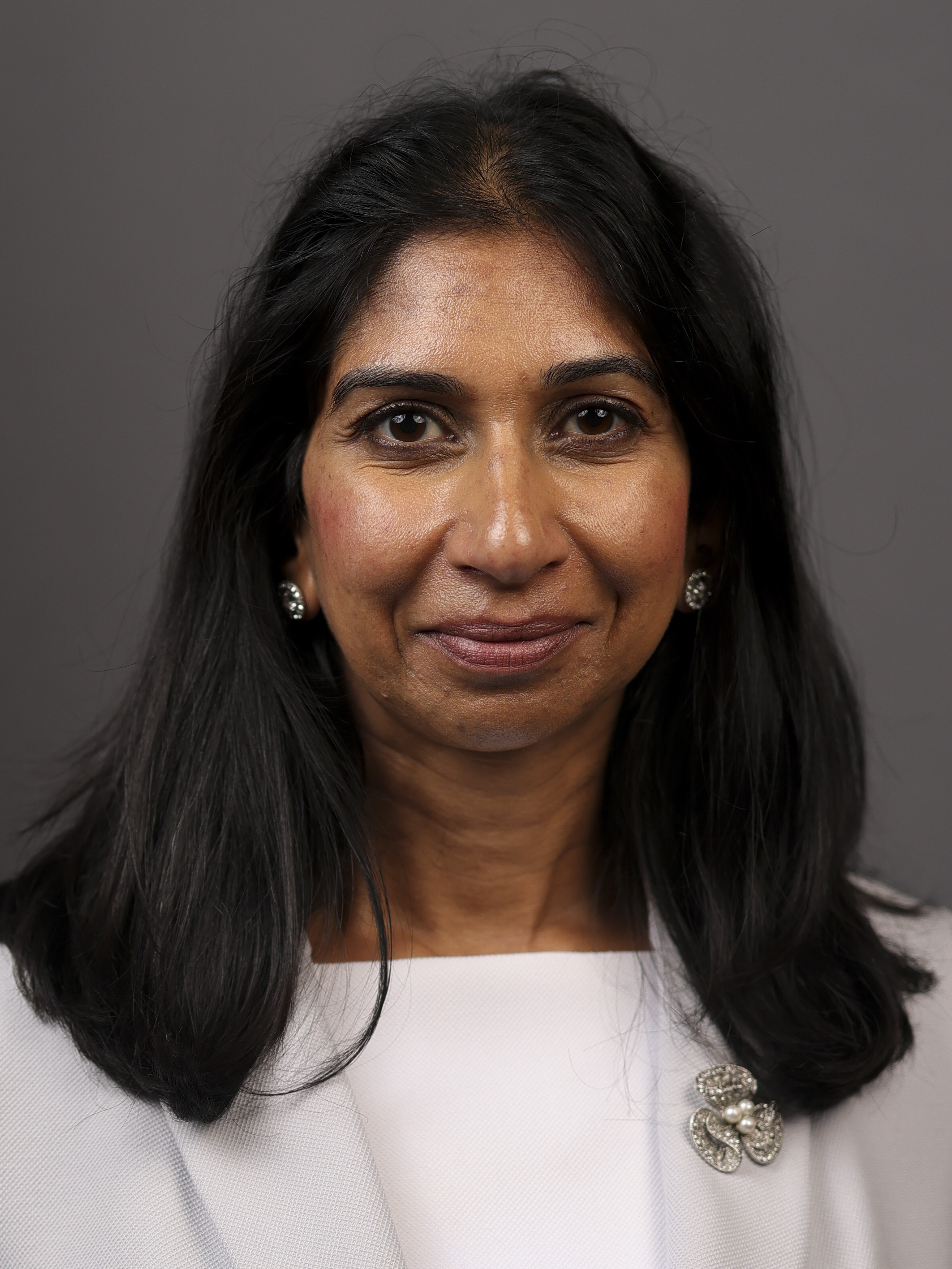
Suella Braverman was dismissed as home secretary in the November cabinet reshuffle

- 1 November – The 2023 AI Safety Summit takes place at Bletchley Park. The UK government announces a "world first agreement" between 28 countries on how to manage the riskiest forms of AI.
- 2 November – Andy Street, the mayor of the West Midlands, has written to the home secretary requesting that his office be granted the powers of the area's Police and Crime Commissioner after the next mayoral election because "crime in this region has more than doubled... and I simply cannot allow it to go on any longer".
- 3 November – At Westminster Magistrates' Court, Bob Stewart, MP for Beckenham, is fined £500 for a racially aggravated public order offence after he told an activist to "go back to Bahrain".
- 5 November –
  - Bob Stewart voluntarily surrenders the Conservative Party Whip following his conviction for a racially aggravated public order offence.
  - Ten Labour councillors including the leader of Burnley Borough Council quit the party over Keir Starmer's decision not to push for a ceasefire in the Gaza war.
- 7 November –
  - Charles III attends the 2023 State Opening of Parliament, his first as King. It is expected to be the last State Opening of Parliament to be held before the 2024 general election.
  - Bradford East MP Imran Hussain resigns as Shadow Minister for the New Deal for Working People from the opposition frontbench citing Keir Starmer's response to the Gaza war.
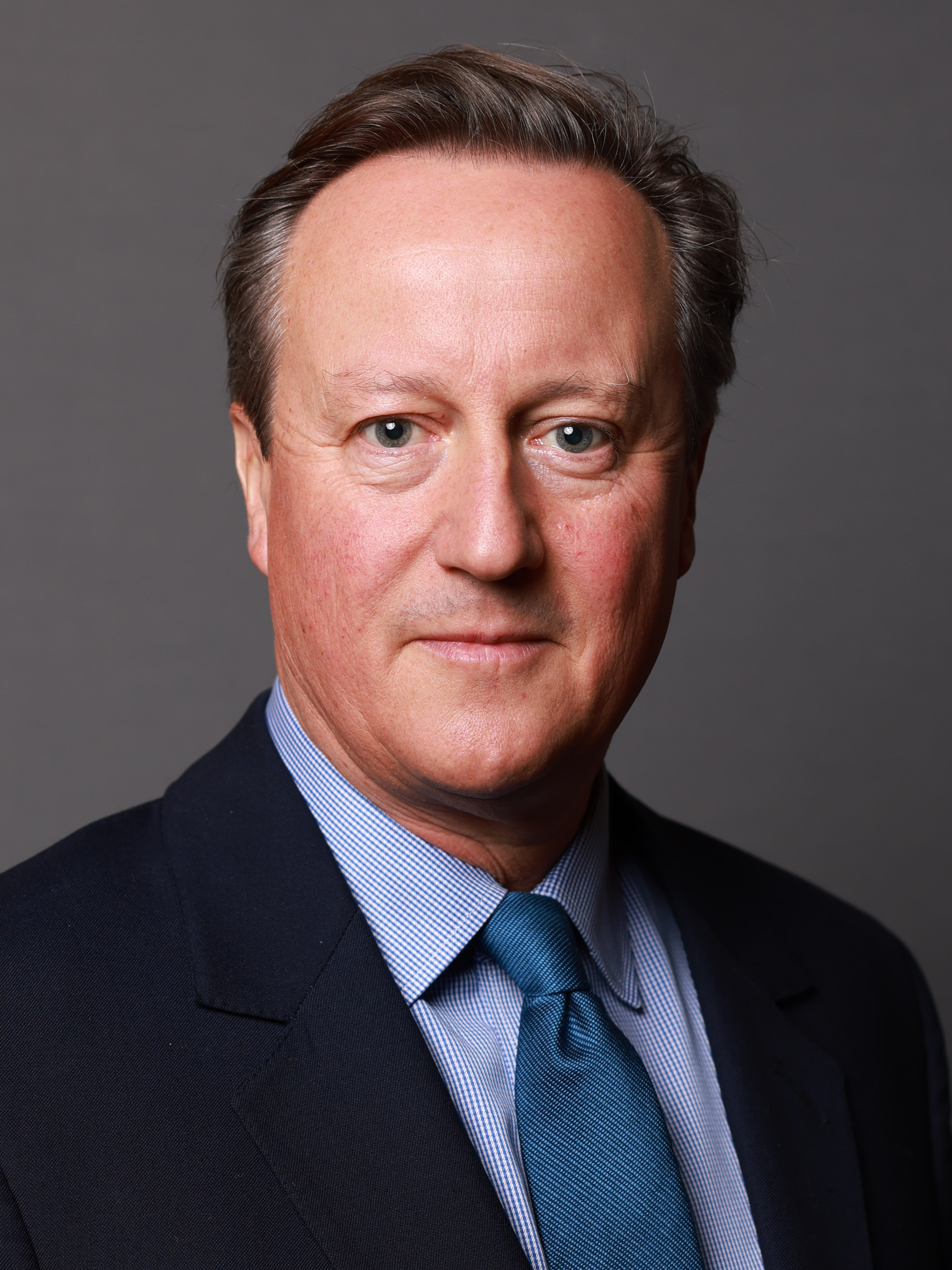
    Former prime minister David Cameron made a surprise return to frontline politics in November 2023, seven years after resigning as prime minister, taking up the role as foreign secretary following the November 2023 British cabinet reshuffle.
- 8 November –
  - The Wellingborough recall petition against suspended MP Peter Bone opens and will be open until 19 December.
  - Carol Vorderman confirms she is to leave her weekly Saturday morning show on BBC Radio Wales after breaching the BBC's impartiality rules by posting content critical of the UK government on X.
  - Members of the Senedd vote 24–19 to back a Plaid Cymru motion calling for a ceasefire in Gaza. The motion is supported by 11 members of Welsh Labour, while First Minister Mark Drakeford is among 11 Labour members to abstain.
- 9 November –
  - An opinion piece by Home Secretary Suella Braverman was published in The Times in which she questioned the impartiality of the police over the way they deal with demonstrations, saying that aggressive right-wing protesters are "rightly met with a stern response", while "pro-Palestinian mobs" are "largely ignored".
  - The 2023 Hackney mayoral by-election takes place following the resignation of Philip Glanville as Mayor of Hackney in September. Caroline Woodley is elected as the borough's first female mayor.
- 10 November –
  - Downing Street says that Rishi Sunak still has "full confidence" in Home Secretary Suella Braverman, while Chancellor Jeremy Hunt says her comments "are not words that I myself would have used".
  - Dame Alison Rose, the former chief executive of NatWest, is to miss out on £7.6m of bonuses and shares after admitting discussing the closure of Nigel Farage's bank account.
  - Scotland's Health Secretary, Michael Matheson, agrees to pay back the £11,000 of roaming charges he built up while using his iPad during a holiday in Morocco.
- 13 November –
  - November 2023 British cabinet reshuffle: Suella Braverman is sacked as home secretary and replaced by James Cleverly. In a surprise move, the former PM David Cameron is appointed as foreign secretary. Therese Coffey resigns as environment secretary and is succeeded by Steve Barclay. Richard Holden is made the Conservative party chair, replacing Greg Hands; Victoria Atkins is promoted to health secretary; Laura Trott becomes chief secretary to the Treasury.
  - Andrea Jenkyns submitted a public letter of no confidence in Rishi Sunak.
  - Downing Street announces that Cameron will be appointed to the House of Lords as a life peer.
  - Wales's health minister, Eluned Morgan, apologises over a social media post commenting on David Cameron's appointment as foreign secretary in which she asked if "Thatcher's hearse" would be next to arrive at Downing Street.
- 14 November –
  - Gaza war: David Cameron, the new foreign secretary, announces sanctions against four senior Hamas leaders and two of the militant group's financiers.
  - In a letter to the Rishi Sunak, former home secretary Suella Braverman accuses the prime minister of failure and betrayal on key policies.
  - A group of economists supported by former prime minister Liz Truss proposes an alternative "growth budget" ahead of the autumn statement, which it claims would boost economic growth by cutting taxes and benefits.
  - Scottish Conservatives threaten to table a vote of no confidence in Scottish Health Secretary Michael Matheson if he refuses to hand over his ministerial iPad.
- 15 November –
  - The British Government's plan to deport migrants to Rwanda is ruled as unlawful by the Supreme Court.
  - Sunak says the government will introduce "emergency legislation" to enable Parliament to "confirm Rwanda is safe" and prevent legal challenges from blocking the migrant policy.
  - Labour frontbenchers resign to vote for an SNP motion calling for a ceasefire in Gaza.
  - MPs vote 293–125 to reject the SNP's amendment calling for a ceasefire in Gaza.
  - Senedd Presiding Officer Elin Jones announces an independent review of television channels that will be available in the Senedd building following her previous ban of GB News.
- 16 November –
  - David Cameron makes his first working visit to Ukraine as foreign secretary, where he meets President Volodymyr Zelenskyy in Kyiv, and reiterates the UK's promise to provide moral, diplomatic and "above all military support for... however long it takes".
  - In a statement to the Scottish Parliament, Health Secretary Michael Matheson says the cause of his £11,000 roaming charges bill came from his sons watching football on his parliamentary iPad while the family was on holiday in Morocco. Matheson confirms he has repaid the money and referred himself to the parliamentary watchdog.
  - Conservative MPs Eleanor Laing and Virginia Crosbie, who were among attendees at a lockdown gathering held at Westminster in December 2020, say they have been told by police they will not be fined over their attendance at the event.
  - Both the Conservatives and Labour launch welfare to work policies ahead of the autumn statement; the Conservatives intend to focus on expanding career support for those on long-term health related benefits, while Labour outlines plans to reduce the 7.8 million NHS waiting list backlog.
- 17 November –
  - Newly appointed health secretary Victoria Atkins says there is no conflict of interest with her husband's job with British Sugar.
  - A grouping of newly independent councillors and others take over Burnley Borough Council from the Labour minority. This was after the resignation of the council leader over the Gaza war.
  - The Scottish Government publishes its plans for European Union membership in an independent Scotland.
  - Police launch an investigation after the constituency office of Jo Stevens, the Shadow Secretary of State for Wales, was vandalised after she abstained during the Parliamentary vote calling for a ceasefire in Gaza.
- 19 November – Independent MP Bob Stewart announces he will not seek re-election at the next general election following his conviction for a racially aggravated public order offence.
- 20 November –
  - David Cameron is sworn in as a member of the House of Lords with the title Lord Cameron of Chipping Norton.
  - James Duddridge, MP for Rochford and Southend East, announces he will stand down from parliament at the next election.
- 21 November –
  - A spokesman for the prime minister says there is "no doubt" the Falkland Islands are British after Javier Milei, the newly elected president of Argentina, said it was time to "get them back".
  - Local councillors have reacted angrily after James Giles, an independent councillor, emailed 19,000 councillors urging them to sign a petition calling for a ceasefire in Gaza and threatening to identify those who did not.
- 22 November –
  - Jeremy Hunt delivers the November 2023 United Kingdom autumn statement.
  - Labour MP Alex Cunningham accuses Home Secretary James Cleverly of describing his constituency, Stockton North, as a "shithole" during Prime Minister's Questions. He alleges that the remark was made after he asked a question about child poverty in the area. A spokesman denies that Cleverly made the remark, and later Deputy Speaker Dame Eleanor Laing says "I understand that the alleged words were not actually used". Cleverly subsequently says he used an "unparliamentary" word to describe the MP but not his constituency.
- 23 November – The Scottish Parliament Corporate Body confirms it has launched an investigation into Health Secretary Michael Matheson's £11,000 data roaming bill.
- 26 November – Conservative deputy chair Lee Anderson claims he was approached by Reform UK and offered the equivalent of five years' worth of MPs salary to defect to the party. The allegation is rejected by Reform UK's leader, Richard Tice.
- 27 November –
  - Sunak cancels a planned meeting with Greek Prime Minister Kyriakos Mitsotakis after a diplomatic row breaks out between the UK and Greece over the Elgin Marbles. Downing Street subsequently says that the meeting was cancelled after Mitsotakis broke an agreement not to discuss the Marbles in public when he told BBC One's Sunday with Laura Kuenssberg he would like them to be returned.
  - Home Secretary James Cleverly apologises to the House of Commons for using "inappropriate language" about MP Alex Cunningham, saying he was using the derogatory term to describe Cunningham himself and not his constituency.
  - The Leasehold and Freehold Bill is introduced into Parliament by Housing Secretary Michael Gove.
- 28 November – Sir Robert Buckland is elected as chair of the House of Commons Northern Ireland Affairs Select Committee.
- 29 November – At Prime Minister's Questions, Sunak accuses the Greek prime minister of trying to "grandstand" over the Elgin Marbles when questioned about his decision to cancel a planned meeting with Mitsotakis.

=== December ===
- 1 December –
  - Bradley Thomas, the Conservative candidate for Bromsgrove, faces another selection vote after an "irregularity" was found in the original process in July 2023.
  - Michael Russell steps down as chairman of the Scottish National Party as he bids to become chairman of the Scottish Land Commission.
- 3 December – Sir Keir Starmer uses a Sunday Times article to credit Margaret Thatcher as a leader who effected "meaningful change" and unleashed Britain's "natural entrepreneurship". Downing Street subsequently responds that Starmer is not "fit to lace Baroness Thatcher's boots".
- 4 December –
  - Home Secretary James Cleverly unveils the UK government's five point plan aimed at reducing legal migration, which includes increasing the minimum salary threshold for a visa from £26,200 to £38,700.
  - MPs vote 246–242 in favour of an amendment to the Victims and Prisoners Bill requiring the UK government to accelerate plans to establish a body to compensate victims of the NHS infected blood scandal, defeating the government which had not planned to include the measure in the legislation.
- 5 December –
  - Home Secretary James Cleverly travels to Rwanda to sign a new immigration treaty which he says addresses the concerns of the Supreme Court.
  - Former minister Chris Huhne is reported to have received a six-figure sum from News UK over a phone-hacking claim.
- 6 December –
  - Robert Jenrick resigns as Minister of State for Immigration after the UK government publishes emergency Rwanda legislation, arguing it "does not go far enough".
  - The Court of Session in Edinburgh rejects a bid by the Scottish Government to prevent the publication of details of an inquiry into whether former first minister Nicola Sturgeon broke the ministerial code over a meeting with Alex Salmond's aide in the aftermath of allegations against Salmon in 2021.
  - Mayor of the West Midlands Andy Street confirms the home secretary has authorised his application to have the powers of the West Midlands Police and Crime Commissioner subsumed into his mayoral role from May 2024.
- 7 December –
  - Sunak calls an emergency press conference at which he urges Conservative MPs to back his latest Rwanda asylum plan. A vote on the legislation is scheduled to face a parliamentary vote on 12 December, but will not be a vote of confidence in the prime minister's authority.
  - Two ministers are appointed to replace Robert Jenrick's ministerial briefing for immigration. Michael Tomlinson is appointed to the role of Minister of State for Illegal Migration, while Tom Pursglove becomes Minister of State for Legal Migration.
  - Conservative councillor Wendy Agnew resigns as chair of Aberdeenshire Council's Kincardine and Mearns area committee following comments made about gypsies during a council meeting in November. Agnew is also being investigated by the Ethical Standards Commissioner following a complaint about the comments.
- 8 December –
  - A letter to MPs from Sir Matthew Rycroft, the Permanent Under-Secretary of State of the Home Office, reveals that £240m has been paid so far to Rwanda for the Rwanda asylum plan, with a further £50m to be paid in 2024.
  - The Court of Session in Edinburgh rules that the UK government acted lawfully by blocking the Gender Recognition Reform (Scotland) Bill from becoming law, and rejects the Scottish Government's appeal against the decision.
  - Police have closed their investigation into potential breaches of COVID rules at a gathering held at Westminster on 8 December 2020, determining that it did not meet the threshold for issuing fines.
- 9 December – As part of an initiative to make being an MP more attractive as a career, MPs who lose their seats at the next election will receive publicly funded careers advice under a proposed "transition scheme" as they search for new occupations.
- 10 December –
  - Lawyers on the right of the Conservative Party have described the revised Rwanda legislation as not "sufficiently watertight".
  - In his first broadcast since leaving the post of Immigration Minister, Robert Jenrick tells the BBC Sunak's revised Rwanda plan is unlikely to work since it is "weak" and will become "bogged down" in legal challenges.
  - Speaking in a YouTube documentary, Conservative peer Baroness Michelle Mone says she "regrets" not being more transparent about her involvement with PPE Medpro, a company contracted to supply personal protective equipment during the pandemic.
  - The Green Party cuts ties with Green Party Women, one of its members' groups, after the group objected to the party's stance on "gender-critical views".
  - Foreign Secretary David Cameron threatens to withdraw co-operation with Scottish ministers following a meeting between Humza Yousaf, the first minister of Scotland, and Turkish president Recep Tayyip Erdogan at the 2023 United Nations Climate Change Conference, which took place without the presence of a UK official which Cameron said was a breach of protocol. In response, Yousaf calls the threat "petty" and "misguided".
- 11 December –
  - Conservative MPs from the European Research Group (ERG) say the UK government's Rwanda asylum plan will not work because it does not go "far enough to deliver the policy".
  - The UK government is offering a £2.5bn financial package for the return of a Stormont Executive, which includes funds to settle public sector disputes and for public services.
  - The Foreign and Commonwealth Office is to move from its Abercrombie House offices in East Kilbride to an undisclosed location in Glasgow some time after 2025, it is announced, with His Majesty's Revenue and Customs moving from Queensway House to replace the FCO at Abercrombie House.
- 12 December –
  - The UK government avoids defeat after MPs vote 313–269 in favour of the revised Rwanda Bill.
  - Nick Brown, Independent MP for Newcastle upon Tyne East, announces he will stand down from Parliament at the next election.
  - First Minister of Wales Mark Drakeford launches an investigation into whether Sports Minister Dawn Bowden breached the ministerial code over her handling of the Welsh Rugby Union sexism scandal.
  - Former government minister David Davis intervenes to stop an attack on a rough sleeper near Parliament.
- 13 December – Mark Drakeford announces his resignation as leader of the Welsh Labour Party. He says he will leave his post as first minister when a successor has been selected.
- 14 December –
  - A report by the Commons Select Committee on Standards recommends Scott Benton, MP for Blackpool, be suspended from Parliament for 35 days over a "very serious breach" of the rules regarding standards after giving the message that "he was corrupt and 'for sale'". Benton subsequently confirms his intention to appeal against the ruling.
  - Mims Davies is appointed minister for disabled people, replacing Tom Pursglove.
  - Wales's Economy Minister, Vaughan Gething, announces his intention to stand in the 2024 Welsh Labour leadership election.
- 15 December –
  - Paul Barnett, leader of the Labour controlled Hastings Borough Council, leaves the Labour Party along with five colleagues to establish an independent group, citing what they collectively describe as Labour's lack of "focus on local government".
  - A review commissioned by NatWest into the closure of Coutts' customer accounts has found "no evidence of discrimination" in relation to people's political views.
  - Eluned Morgan, considered a favourite in the Welsh Labour leadership election, rules herself out of the contest.
- 16 December – Sunak travels to Italy to attend a right-wing rally in Rome, where he discusses his immigration policy and calls for changes to global refugee rules.
- 17 December –
  - Michelle Mone says that, in certain circumstances, she could benefit from some of the profits made by personal protective equipment sold to the UK government during the COVID-19 pandemic by a company run by her husband, Doug Barrowman.
  - Foreign Secretary David Cameron has said he would like to see a "sustainable ceasefire" in Gaza because "too many civilians have been killed".
  - The UK government announces it will introduce an amendment to the Criminal Justice Bill to make it clear "without any doubt" that the act of spiking another person's drink is illegal, but the measures will stop short of making spiking a specific offence.
  - Drakeford expresses his disappointment there are no women candidates in the Welsh Labour leadership contest, and claims personal attacks on social media have discouraged them from entering the contest.
  - Comedian Eddie Izzard loses a vote to become the Labour Party candidate for Brighton Pavilion after local party members choose musician Tom Gray instead.
- 18 December –
  - Miriam Cates, MP for Penistone and Stocksbridge, is placed under investigation by the Parliamentary Commissioner for Standards for an undisclosed reason.
  - In response to Michelle Mone acknowledging that, in certain circumstances, she could benefit from some of the profits of a government PPE contract, Sunak says the government is taking the issue "incredibly seriously" and is pursuing legal action against PPE Medpro.
  - Welsh Education Minister Jeremy Miles formally announces his Welsh Labour leadership campaign after winning the backing of 16 Labour members of the Senedd.
- 19 December –
  - Finance Secretary Shona Robison presents the Scottish Government's budget for 2024–25. Measures announced include a new 45% tax rate for people earning between £75,000 and £125,140, and a rise in the top rate of tax, paid by those earning over £125,000, from 47% to 48%. The £43,663 tax threshold is also frozen for the year.
  - During routine questioning from MPs from Parliament's Liaison Committee, Sunak says that he does not have a "precise" date by which he hopes to stop migrants from crossing the English channel in boats.
  - The Wellingborough recall petition closes, and triggers a by-election after 13.2% of constituents sign the petition.
  - The budget for Wales, announced by Finance Minister Rebecca Evans, cuts spending on public services, with funds being diverted to support the NHS.
- 20 December –
  - Tánaiste Micheál Martin announces Irish government plans to "initiate an inter-State case against the United Kingdom under the European Convention on Human Rights" over provisions in the Northern Ireland Troubles (Legacy and Reconciliation) Act 2023 which offers immunity from prosecution for certain Troubles-era related offences.
  - The Scottish Government confirms it will abandon its legal challenge against the UK government's veto of the Gender Recognition Reform (Scotland) Bill.
  - Andrew Bridgen announces he has left the Reclaim Party seven months after joining over what he describes as a "difference in the direction of the party".
- 21 December –
  - Former justice secretary Sir Robert Buckland urges the UK government to do more to tackle the misuse of Artificial Intelligence to potentially disrupt the next general election, describing it as a "clear and present danger" to UK democracy.
  - The UK government revises plans to increase the minimum salary someone coming to the UK must earn to apply for a family visa. Original plans to raise the amount from £18,600 to £38,700 are now updated to £29,000 from spring 2024, with no timetable for any further increases. Sunak subsequently confirms the £38,700 threshold will be introduced in early 2025.
  - Chancellor Jeremy Hunt signs a deal with Switzerland to facilitate easier financial transactions between Swiss and UK companies.
- 24 December – Home Secretary James Cleverly apologises after a Sunday Mirror report that he made an "ironic joke" about spiking his wife's drink at a Downing Street reception shortly after the UK government's announcement that it would clearly define the activity as being illegal.
- 26 December – The Labour Party says it is confiding processing some asylum claims overseas before asylum seekers reach the UK if it forms the government after the next general election.
- 27 December – HM Treasury confirms the date of the 2024 United Kingdom budget as 6 March.
- 29 December –
  - James Daly, the MP for Bury North, said in a newspaper interview that the majority of children in his constituency who are struggling are "the products of crap parents" and that "he wanted to help people from disadvantaged backgrounds have the best chance to succeed".
  - Among those from the world of politics to be recognised in the 2024 New Year's Honours are Sajid Javid (KBE), Dame Margaret Beckett (Dame Grand Cross), Siobhain McDonagh (Dame Commander), Maggie Throup (CBE), and Huw Edwards (MBE).
  - Liz Truss's Resignation Honours are published, and consist mostly of political supporters and former aides.
  - The UK government says that a report published on the GOV.UK website on 27 December that said housing asylum seekers on the Bibby Stockholm barge was discriminatory on the grounds of age and sex was published by mistake. The report is deleted from the website.
- 31 December – Former Downing Street Director of Communications Dominic Cummings claims in a blog post to have attended two meetings with Sunak during the past year to discuss political strategy ahead of the next general election, and that the prime minister asked him to "secretly" work on strategy.

== Deaths ==
- 5 January – Thomas Stonor, 7th Baron Camoys, 82, British banker and peer, lord chamberlain (1998–2000).
- 31 January – Alan Hurst, 77, British politician, MP for Braintree (1997–2005).
- 3 February – Robert Key, 77, English politician, Minister for Sport (1992–1993).
- 6 February – Janet Anderson, 73, British politician, Minister for Film, Tourism and Broadcasting (1998–2001).
- 26 February – Betty Boothroyd, Baroness Boothroyd, 93, British politician, first woman Speaker of the House of Commons (1992–2000).
- 26 February – Thomas Pendry, Baron Pendry, PC, 88, British politician, member of parliament for Stalybridge and Hyde (1970–2001), member of the House of Lords (since 2001).
- 12 March – Susan Cunliffe-Lister, Baroness Masham of Ilton, 87, British politician, member of the House of Lords (since 1970) and Paralympic champion (1960, 1964).
- 18 March – Robert Lindsay, 29th Earl of Crawford, 96, Scottish peer, MP (1955–1974), member of the House of Lords (1974–2019) and Minister of State for Defence (1970–1972).
- 21 March – John Smith, Baron Kirkhill, 92, Scottish peer, Lord Provost of Aberdeen (1971–1975), Minister of State for Scotland (1975–1978) and member of the House of Lords (1975–2018).
- 3 April – Nigel Lawson, Baron Lawson of Blaby, 91, British politician, Chancellor of the Exchequer (1983–1989).
- 9 April – Andrew Phillips, Baron Phillips of Sudbury, 84, British solicitor and politician.
- 13 May – Peter Brooke, Baron Brooke of Sutton Mandeville, 89, British politician, Secretary of State for Northern Ireland (1989–1992).
- 5 June – John Morris, Baron Morris of Aberavon, 91, British politician, MP (1959–2001), Attorney General for England and Wales and Attorney General for Northern Ireland (1997–1999).
- 13 June – Stanley Clinton-Davis, Baron Clinton-Davis, 94, British politician, Minister of State for Trade Policy (1997–1998).
- 15 June – Glenda Jackson, 87, English actress and politician.
- 21 June – Winnie Ewing, 93, Scottish politician MP (1967–1979), MEP (1979–1999), MSP (1999–2003), President of the Scottish National Party (1987–2005).
- 24 June – Margaret McDonagh, Baroness McDonagh, 61, English politician, Labour's first female general secretary (1998–2001).
- 1 July – Bob Kerslake, Baron Kerslake, 68, Head of the Home Civil Service (2012–2014)
- 21 July – Ann Clwyd, 86, politician and Labour Party MP for Cynon Valley (1984–2019)
- 19 August – Rodney Elton, 2nd Baron Elton, 88, British peer and politician.
- 27 August – Michael Brougham, 5th Baron Brougham and Vaux, 85, British peer and politician.
- 28 August – Alan Haworth, Baron Haworth, 75, British politician, Secretary of the Parliamentary Labour Party (1992–2004).
- 6 October – Susan Thomas, Baroness Thomas of Walliswood, 87, British businesswoman and politician, member of the House of Lords (1994–2016).
- 8 October – Sir Thomas Legg, 88, British civil servant, Clerk of the Crown in Chancery (1989–1998).
- 13 October – Linda Arkley, 71, British politician, mayor of North Tyneside (2003–2005, 2009–2013).
- 20 October – Donald Angus Cameron of Lochiel, 77, Scottish clan chief and public servant, Lord Lieutenant of Inverness (2002–2021).
- 24 October – Murray Elder, Baron Elder, 73, Scottish politician and member of the House of Lords (1999–2003).
- 5 November – David Hilditch, 60, DUP politician and Member of the Northern Ireland Assembly (1998–2023)
- 7 November – Igor Judge, Baron Judge, 82, English judge, lord chief justice (2008–2013).
- 9 November – James Robertson, 95, British political activist, economist, and writer.
- 14 November –
  - Sir Tom Arnold, 76, British politician, MP (1974–1997).
  - Brian Cotter, Baron Cotter, 87, British politician, MP (1997–2005) and member of the House of Lords (since 2006).
- 16 November – Robert Walker, Baron Walker of Gestingthorpe, 85, British jurist, justice of the supreme court (2009–2013), Lord of Appeal in Ordinary (2002–2009) and Lord Justice of Appeal (1997–2002).
- 26 November – Norman Irons, 82, Scottish councillor and honorary consul, lord provost of Edinburgh (1992–1996).
- 28 November –
  - James Douglas-Hamilton, Baron Selkirk of Douglas, 81, Scottish politician, MP (1974–1997), MSP (1999–2007) and member of the House of Lords (1997–2023).
  - Allan Rogers, 91, Labour Party politician, MP (1983–2001) and MEP (1979–1984).
- 29 November – James Couchman, 81, British politician, MP (1983–1997).
- 30 November – Alistair Darling, Baron Darling of Roulanish, 70, British politician, chancellor of the Exchequer (2007–2010), MP (1987–2015) and member of the House of Lords (2015–2020).
- 3 December – Glenys Kinnock, Baroness Kinnock of Holyhead, 79, British politician, MEP (1994–2009), member of the House of Lords (2009–2021), and minister of state for Europe (2009).
- 14 December – Hanzala Malik, 67, Scottish politician, MSP (2011–2016). (death announced on this date)

== See also ==
- 2023 United Kingdom electoral calendar
