= National Driver Offender Retraining Scheme =

Driving safety program in the UK

The National Driver Offender Retraining Scheme (NDORS) is a scheme run in parts of the United Kingdom whereby certain drivers found committing a driving offence can be offered a training course as an alternative to prosecution.

== Background ==
The idea of having re-education rather than prosecution for driving offences was first raised in the North Report in the late 1980s. The report stated that "it must be in the public interest to rectify a fault rather than punish the transgressor" and "retraining of traffic offenders may lead to an improvement in their driving, particularly if their training is angled towards their failings".

The NDORS scheme is governed by guidance issued by the Association of Chief Police Officers and endorsed by the Crown Prosecution Service.

In the year 2010–11, 41% of drivers caught speeding nationally took a course; in the following year the figure rose to 54%.

== Course types and content ==
The ACPO guidance lists three types of course:

- Safe and Considerate Driving (for non-serious collisions and complaints by 3rd parties)
- National speed awareness course (for speeding up to 10% + 9 mph over the speed limit)
- What's driving Us Course (for conscious bad driving not resulting in a collision)

Each of these courses is designed to address different types of driver error, including offences such as speeding, driving without due care and attention, using a mobile phone and failing to wear a seat belt.

== Availability of courses in England and Wales ==
Whilst all 43 police forces in England and Wales are members of the NDORS Schemes, not all police forces provide access to all of the courses offered and therefore an enquiry has to be made with the individual police force to determine whether or not they offer a driver retraining scheme for the offence which has been committed. This is with the exception of speeding, for which all police forces in England and Wales offer the National Speed Awareness Course.

Following a Freedom of Information Request made by solicitors in 2015, it has been established that the same courses are not offered by all 43 police forces across England and Wales.

== Course delivery ==
Courses are offered at the discretion of the prosecuting authority – for example, the South Yorkshire Safety Camera Partnership state that "although we do have the power to prosecute those who break the speed limit, we would rather persuade drivers to slow down".

Whilst offered on a discretionary basis, guidance is issued to the 43 police forces operating in England and Wales as to when a driver should be considered as eligible to attend a course. The current guidance is contained within a document entitled, "National Driver Offender Retraining Scheme (NDORS): Guidance on Eligibility Criteria for NDORS Courses. In addition to a consideration of the circumstances of the offence in determining whether or not a person is eligible to attend on a course, the guidance provides that the police should also consider the following:

- Whether or not there is a realistic prospect of conviction i.e. is there evidence that the person has committed the offence
- There is no other offence committed i.e. it is a single offence
- A similar course has not been attended within three years for a similar offence
- The driver holds a full UK driving licence or similar certificate of competence

The courses are given by different types of provider – including private companies, the police, and local councils – in different parts of the country, and are provided at the offending driver's own expense. In 2012, The Daily Telegraph reported the cost of attending a speed awareness course to be £100.

== Reception ==
A comprehensive review undertaken by a team led by Professor Robert Martin of Aston University Business School found that speed awareness courses had a "long term impact on driver behaviour". Martin stated that "the results clearly show that the speed awareness course led to reliable improvements in client's attitude to speeding and importantly their intention not to break the speed limit."

=== Impact on insurance premiums ===
Some insurance companies, including Admiral Insurance, formerly treated drivers who attended speed awareness courses as if they have been convicted and raise their insurance premiums accordingly. Admiral Insurance stated that their figures show "people attending a speed awareness course are more likely to make a claim". ACPO has responded to this policy of "loading premiums", calling it "unfair" and "inappropriate". Other insurers also take a different view. A spokesman for AA insurance said "The view of most insurers, including the AA, is that attending a course is a responsible approach and should not be penalised by increasing premiums in the same way as a fixed penalty." As of 2025 Admiral no longer ask drivers for this information.

== See also ==
- Traffic school
