= 2023 United Kingdom electoral calendar =

This is a list of elections in the United Kingdom scheduled to be held in 2023. Included are local elections, by-elections on any level, referendums and internal party elections.

== Dates ==
- 9 February: 2023 West Lancashire by-election
- 4 May: 2023 England local elections
- 18 May: 2023 Northern Ireland local elections
- 20 July: 2023 Uxbridge and South Ruislip by-election
- 20 July: 2023 Selby and Ainsty by-election
- 20 July: 2023 Somerton and Frome by-election
- 5 October: 2023 Rutherglen and Hamilton West by-election
- 12 October: 2023 Gibraltar general election
- 19 October: 2023 Mid Bedfordshire by-election
- 19 October: 2023 Tamworth by-election

== See also ==
- 2023 in the United Kingdom
