= Advisory Committee on Business Appointments =

United Kingdom government body

The Advisory Committee on Business Appointments (ACOBA) was a non-departmental public body in the United Kingdom, set up in 1975 to provide advice on applications from the most senior Crown servants who wished to take up outside appointments after leaving Crown service. Between 1995 and 2025, it provided advice to former Ministers on their employment in the two years after leaving office. The committee, which was sponsored by the Cabinet Office, was last chaired by Isabel Doverty.

Following a government announcement in July 2025, ACOBA ceased to exist on 13 October 2025. ACOBA's functions were transferred to the Independent Adviser on Ministerial Standards (for ministers) and the Civil Service Commission (for civil servants).

== Membership ==
At its closure, ACOBA had nine members. They were appointed by the Prime Minister. Three members were nominated by the main political parties. The remaining members were independent. Members served a single non-renewable five year term.

Previous Members	Party
Lord Pickles	Conservative
Baroness Jones of Whitchurch	Labour
Mike Weir	SNP
Hedley Finn	Independent
Michael Prescott	Independent
Dawid Konotey-Ahulu	Independent
Isabel Doverty	Independent
Sarah de Gay	Independent
Andrew Cumpsty	Independent

== Role ==
ACOBA was responsible for the administration of the government's Business Administration Rules, which aimed to prevent former civil servants and ministers profiting from their knowledge of or contacts within Whitehall, and to prevent them from being brought into perceived disrepute.

The Ministerial Code prohibits ministers from lobbying the government for two years after leaving office. Former ministers who wished to take up employment or an appointment within two years were required to seek ACOBA advice, completing and submitting an official application form.

Compliance with ACOBA advice was voluntary, with no power to sanction those who breached advice provided. The Committee's Secretariat reiterated this in a 2018 Freedom of Information (FOI) request, "ACOBA ... has no enforcement power and therefore depends upon voluntary cooperation from applicants..."

== Criticism ==
Criticism stemmed from the powers ACOBA held, which were limited to activities such as recommendations against future appointments and honours. The committee had been the source of several enquiries into its effectiveness. In 2022, the Public Administration and Constitutional Affairs Select Committee (PACAC) recommended that ACOBA be put on a statutory basis with legal powers to enforce its recommendations, after branding the committee in its current form as "toothless" in April 2017.

In April 2024, Lord Pickles - chair of the committee - wrote to the Cabinet Office setting out the belief of ACOBA that current business rules were outdated and relied overly on a “good chaps” model of government. Pickles called for a new “modern framework” to update the business appointment rules, including measures such as removing low-profile cases from the remit of the committee to focus resources and stronger sanctions for non-compliance. In January 2025, he continued to raise awareness of his concerns about ACOBA's effectiveness.
