= Al Ard Film Festival =

Sardinian Film Festival about the Arab world and Palestine

- Location: Cagliari, Sardinia, Italy
- Founded: 2002; 24 years ago
- Most recent: 21st edition, February 2025
- Awards: Best Feature Documentary Film; Best Short Documentary Film; Best Short Fiction Film; Audience Award
- Website: alardfilmfestival.com

Al Ard Film Festival (from Arabic: الأرض, romanized: al-Arḍ, lit. 'the Land') is an international film festival aimed at raising popular awareness of Palestinian and Arab culture and Islamic art. The festival takes place yearly in Cagliari, Sardinia, Italy, since 2002. It is organised by the Associazione Amicizia Sardegna Palestina (Sardinia–Palestine Friendship Association), a local volunteer organisation founded in 1997.

One of the frequent guests of Al Ard Film Festival in Sardinia is Monica Maurer, who from the 1970s has directed films about the Palestinian fight.

== History ==
The first edition of Al Ard (meaning "The Land" in Arabic) was held in Cagliari, and, since then, it has grown in popularity and international reach, attracting a diverse and engaged audience. The festival has become a beloved and eagerly anticipated annual event for the local community, and its success has helped to put Cagliari on the map as a destination for film enthusiasts even from outside the island.

== Mission ==
Since its first edition, the mission of the event has been to promote fundamental rights, such as the right of self-determination, with a particular focus on Palestine. Started as a small local event, over the years, Al Ard has become an international film festival, and it is now among the most popular events about the Arab world in Southern Europe.

== Editions ==
The festival has been held annually since 2002 and has grown to become a major cultural event in the region. The 19th edition of Al Ard Film Festival took place in February 2023 at the Teatro Massimo in Cagliari. The festival attracts international guests, some of whom have been part of the Jury multiple times, such as Monica Maurer, Ibrahim Nasrallah, May Odeh, and many other were invited as filmmakers candidates for awards, such as Mai Masri, Sahera Dirbas, Mohammed Alatar, Kasim Abid, Elia Ghorbia, Linda Paganelli, Habib Ayeb, and many more.

Initially, until 2009, the festival was limited to showcasing Arab films, with a particular focus on Palestine, without awarding any prizes. Since 2011, with the introduction of a jury, the festival concludes with an award ceremony, during which various accolades are presented. The jury is made up of film experts and Middle East specialists, who evaluate the competing films based on criteria that include cinematic quality and thematic depth related to the Middle East.

=== Awards ===
Edition	Year	Date	Awards
1	2002	?	
2	2003	?	
3	2004	?	
4	2005	24 - 26 November	
5	2006	1 - 3 December	
6	2008	7 - 9 February	
7	2009	5 - 7 February	
8	2010	not held	
9	2011	15 - 19 February	Audience Award This is my Land… Hebron by Giulia Amati, Stephen Natarson | Italy, 2010; Best Emerging Director Emiliano Sacchetti for A New Day Has Come | Italy, 2010 Giulia Amati & Stephen Natarson for This is my Land… Hebron | Italy, 2010; Best Film About Palestine Gaza… Strophe by Samir Abdallah, Kheridine Mabrouk | France/Palestine, 2010; Best Documentary of the Festival Gaza Hospital by Marco Pasquini | Italy, 2009
10	2012	6 - 10 March	Audience Award Tomorrow’s Land by A. Paco Mariani, N. Zambelli | Italy, 2011; Best Emerging Director Bilal Yousef for Back to One's Root | Palestine/Qatar, 2009; Best Film About Palestine Gaza, Guerra all’Informazione by Anna Maia Selini | Italy, 2009 and Tomorrow’s Land by A. Paco Mariani, N. Zambelli | Italy, 2011; Best Documentary of the Festival Tears of Gaza by Vibeke Lokkeberg | Norway, 2011
11	2013	November	Best Emerging Director Axel Salvatori-Sinz for The Shebabs of Yarmouk | France, 2012; Best Film About Palestine The Kingdom of Women: Ein el Hilweh by Dahna Abourahme | Lebanon, 2010; Best Documentary of the Festival Infiltrators by Khaled Jarrar | Palestine, 2012; Special Mentions of the Jury In my Mother’s Arms by Atia & Mohamed Al-Daradji, Iraq, 2011 Palestina per Principianti by Francesco Merini | Italy, 2012
12	2015	18 - 21 March	Audience Award: Striplife. Gaza in a day by Nicola Grignani, Alberto Mussolini, Luca Scaffidi, Valeria Testagrossa, Andrea Zambelli; Best Emerging Director: Sara Dhedel, Hamza Khalifa, Oday Al Taneeb, Rawan Tamimi, Jaber Abu Rahmeh, Mahmoud Hathaleen, Ahmad Amro for Unknown Soldiers; Best Film About Palestine: Striplife. Gaza in a day by Nicola Grignani, Alberto Mussolini, Luca Scaffidi, Valeria Testagrossa, Andrea Zambelli; Best Documentary of the Festival: We Cannot Go There Now, My Dear by Carol Mansour
13	2016	9 - 12 March	Audience Award: Dreams Behind the Wall by Elena Herreros | Palestine, 2015; Best Emerging Director Ahmad al-Bazz e Yasser Jodallah for To My Mother; Best Film About Palestine The Living of the Pigeons by Baha’ Abu Shanab | Palestine, 2014; Best Documentary of the Festival Nun wa Zaytun by Emtiaz Diab | Palestine, 2015; Special Mentions of the Jury: 30th of March by Nidal Badarny | Palestine, 2014 Roshmia by Salim Abu Jabal | Palestine 2014
14	2017	7 - 11 March	Audience Award Detained Dreams by Nisreen Silmi; Best Emerging Director Elia Ghorbiah for The Bitter Ink; Best Film About Palestine The Wanted 18 by Amer Shomali Death Tunnel by Mohamed Harb; Best Documentary of the Festival Coffee For All Nations by Wafa’ Espvall Emwas ..Restoring Memories by Dima Abu Ghoush; Special Mentions of the Jury: Encounter with a Lost Land by Maryse Garghour
15	2018	17 - 24 March	Audience Award (assigned by the audience) The Truth: Lost at Sea by Rifat Audeh (Jordan); Al Ard Award (best documentary of the Festival, assigned by the jury) Dream Fragments by Bahïa Bencheikh El-Fegoun (Algeria); Palestine Award (best documentary about Palestine, assigned by the jury) Broken Dreams by Mohamed Harb (Palestine); Emerging Director Award (assigned by the jury) Home by Berber Verpoest (Belgium); Special Mentions of the Jury Bloody Basil by Elia Gorbiah (Palestine); Sardegna Palestina Award (assigned by the Selection Board) Ghost Hunting by Raed Andoni (France, Palestine, Switzerland, Qatar)
16	2019	11 - 16 March	Audience Award (assigned by the audience) Broken. A Palestinian Journey through International Law by Mohammed Alatar; Al Ard Award (best documentary of the Festival, assigned by the jury) You Come from Far Away by Amal Ramsis; Palestine Award (best documentary about Palestine, assigned by the jury) Five Minutes by Ahmed Nasser Barghouti; Emerging Director Award (assigned by the jury) Razan by Hanan Alastal and Iyad Alastal; Special Mentions of the Jury Farming Under Fire by Matthew Cassel Broken. A Palestinian Journey through International Law by Mohammed Alatar; Sardegna Palestina Award (assigned by the Selection Board) Mirrors of Diaspora by Kasim Abid; Echo of the Camp Award (assigned by the Selection Board) Without Waves by Wisam Al Jafari
17	2020	17 - 22 August	Audience Award (assigned by the audience) Between Two Crossings by Yasser Murtaja; Al Ard Award (best documentary of the Festival, assigned by the jury) Between Two Crossings by Yasser Murtaja; Palestine Award (best documentary about Palestine, assigned by the jury) On The Doorstep by Sahera Dirbas; Emerging Director Award (assigned by the jury) Imprisoning a Generation by Zelda Edmunds; Sardegna Palestina Award (assigned by the Selection Board) The Walls of Dheisheh by Clemence Lehec and Tamara Abu Laban; Echo of the Camp Award (assigned by the Selection Board ) Ambience by Wisam Al Jafari; Handala Award (assigned by the Selection Board) Memory of the Land by Samira Badran; Special Mentions of the Jury: Aisle by Hisham Kayed Hummus by Abdel Lafi Seed Queen by Mariam Shahin
18	2022	9 - 13 March	Audience Award (assigned by the audience) Sarura. The Future is an Unknown Place by Nicola Zambelli; Al Ard Award (best documentary of the Festival, assigned by the jury) Beirut: Eye of the Storm by Mai Masri; Palestine Award (best documentary about Palestine, assigned by the jury) Letter to a Friend by Emily Jacir; Emerging Director Award (assigned by the jury) Liwan: a Story of Cultural Resistance by Doris Hakim; Sardegna Palestina Award (assigned by the Selection Board) Walled Citizen by Sameer Qumsiyeh; Handala Award (assigned by the Selection Board) What Remains by Christian Harb; Special Mentions of the Jury: A Talk with Remarkable People by Maryse Garghour Bank of Targets by Roshdi Sarraj The Wall by Mira Sidawi
19	2023	21-25 February	Audience Award (assigned by the audience) Sulla loro pelle by Marika Ikonomu, Alessandro Leone and Simone Manda; Best documentary Feature Film (assigned by the Jury) Not Just Your Picture – the Story of the Kilani family directed by Anne Paq and Dror Dayan; Palestine Award (best documentary about Palestine, assigned by the Jury) Erasmus in Gaza by Chiara Avesani and Matteo Delbò; Emerging Director Award (assigned by the Jury) Last May in Palestine by Rabeea Eid; Best Documentary Short Feature (assigned by the Jury) 4000 voices by Sajjad Kwaish; Sardegna Palestina Award (assigned by the Selection Board) Sulla loro pelle by Marika Ikonomu, Alessandro Leone and Simone Manda; Best Film Fiction (short feature - assigned by the Selection Board) Yalla by Carlo D'Ursi; Special Mentions of the Jury: Eulogy for the Dead Sea by Polina Teif Waiting for Farajallah by Nidal Badarny
20	2024	20-24 February	Audience Award (assigned by the audience) Reel Rock: Resistance Climbing (USA, 2023) by Nick Rosen and Zachary Barr; Best Long Feature Documentary (assigned by the Jury) In the Shadow of Beirut (Ireland, 2023) directed by Stephen Gerard Kelly and Garry Keane; Best Short Feature Documentary (assigned by the Jury) Heavy Metal (Ireland, 2023) directed by Edward Knowles and Timo Bruun; Best Fiction (assigned by the Jury) Uncle Give Me a Cigarette directed by Al Masna; Special Mentions of the Jury: The Soil and the Sea by Daniele Rugo; The Key by Rakan Mayasi; Little Sahara by Emilio Martí López
21	2025	25 Feb - 1 Mar	Best Long Feature Documentary; A State of Passion by Carol Mansour and Muna Khalidi | Lebanon | 2024; Best Short Feature Documentary; Deferred Reclaim by Abdallah Motan | Palestine | 2024; Best Non-doc; Blood Like Water by Dima Hamdan | Palestine | 2023; Audience Award; The Devil’s Drivers by Mohammed Abugeth & Daniel Carsenty | Germany/Palestine/Qatar/Lebanon | 2021; Special Mentions; The Devil’s Drivers; Vibrations From Gaza; A Lullaby Unlike Any Other
