= Arab film festivals =

A growing number of film festivals are held in the Arab world to showcase films from the region as well as international standouts. In addition, institutions and organizations in other parts of the world are increasingly honoring the new generation of filmmakers in the Arab world with Arab film festivals.

Though burgeoning filmmakers from majority Arabic-speaking countries still struggle with constrained funding and a lack of established distribution channels, artists are beginning to produce more and more commercially viable films. Films featured at festivals both in the Arab world and elsewhere around the globe run the gamut from films about war, identity, political or social issues to romantic comedies and thrillers.

Goals of festival organizers are largely to provide an alternative and more inclusive portrayal of people from the Arab world to that in mainstream global media in order to promote understanding and dialogue between this region and the rest of the world, especially the West. In addition, festivals work to support filmmakers from the Arab world and elsewhere by providing a platform for them to screen and promote their cinematic achievements to broad audiences.

== Arab film festivals in the Arab World ==
=== Egypt ===
The Cairo International Film Festival is a world-class annual film festival in Cairo, Egypt. Founded in 1976, it was the first film festival to be held in the Arab world and was the only international competitive feature film festival in the West Asia and Africa recognized by the FIAPF until Fajr International Film Festival became another west Asian festival accredited by FIAPF. The festival has awarded many Egyptian and internationally renowned actors, actresses and directors. Special awards, such as the Best Arab Film Award, are bestowed upon the most exceptional regional films of the year.

In addition, the Alexandria International Film Festival, Egypt's second largest film festival, is held every September in local theaters. Founded in 1979, it is organized by the Egyptian Association of Film Writers and Critics (EAFWC), the festival promotes film culture and aims to bolster relations among international filmmakers and the Mediterranean in particular.

Celebrating its 10th edition in 2017 is the Cairo International Women's Film Festival. From its earliest edition, Entre Cineastas, to the Caravan of Arab and Latin American Women's Films, CIWFF has developed and expanded over the years. The festival aims at introducing films made by female filmmakers from around the world and serving as a meeting point for them and the audience. Chosen solely by public vote, one film is presented with the Audience Award.

Other film festivals held in Egypt include:

- Aswan International Women's Film Festival
- Cairo Cinema Days
- Cairo Francophone Film Festival
- Egyptian Catholic Center for Cinema Festival
- El Gouna Film Festival
- Film Association Festival for Egyptian Cinema
- Ismailia International Film Festival for Documentaries and Shorts
- Luxor African Film Festival
- National Egyptian Film Festival
- Port Said International Film Festival
- Sharm El-Sheikh Film Festival

=== Jordan ===
Founded in 2004, the Jordan Short Film Festival is managed by the Amman Filmmakers Cooperative, a film collective based in Amman, Jordan. In addition to a week-long event, the festival organizers promote independent cinema with screenings throughout the year and have launched two main competitions: the International short film competition and the Arab short film competition. Notably, the festival was suspended in 2011 as an act of protest against the killing of peaceful protesters during the Arab Spring. In a statement, the JSFF founder and director noted that "it would be misleading and dishonest to pretend that Jordan under such circumstances can host film festivals that can openly and freely screen films about human rights and other pressing issues."

In 2009, the Karama Human Rights Film Festival was conceived and organized by Ma3mal 612 (Think Factory), a collective of avant-garde artists and filmmakers. Karama, which means dignity, promotes cinema that explores human rights issues and opens democratic dialogue about human rights between and among local and international audiences.

=== Kuwait ===
The Green Caravan Film Festival, in its 5th year now, is West Asia's premiere film festival dedicated to the niche market of environmental films. It began in Kuwait in 2009, and from 2010 added Dubai-based screenings to its programming, and plans to add more Gulf cities to its venue locations in the future.

The Kuwait Young Film Festival, an offshoot of the Kuwait International Film Festival, aims to provide talented youth in Kuwait and elsewhere with an avenue to display their work and compete for awards. Participants must be in school and under 30 years old in order to enter their work. The festival includes film screenings, workshops and social gatherings.

Now in its second year, the Kuwait International Film Retreat is a three-day mini film festival with short and feature film screenings, workshops, social gatherings and an awards ceremony showcasing the best short films in competition.

=== Lebanon ===
Beirut International Film Festival (BIFF) is Lebanon's oldest and most prestigious film festival. The annual competition includes categories for feature films, short films and documentaries. Recent years have seen smaller and more intimate editions of the festival due to the uncertain political climate in the country.

Tripoli Film Festival (TFF) is an international cinematic competition held annually since 2018, usually in the spring in Tripoli, and covering features, shorts, animation and documentaries.

Beirut International Women Film Festival (BWFF) is an annual event held in Beirut.

Maskoon Fantastic Film Festival, the only event in the region that celebreaates genre cinema, launched in 2015 in Beirut.

=== Morocco ===
The International Film Festival of Marrakech, an annual event dedicated to Moroccan and foreign feature and short films, has been held at the end of every year for the past twelve years. His Royal Highness Prince Moulay Rachid presides over the event, which always attracts a bevy of stars. In addition to a grand prize, awards are also given out for best actor, best actress, best short film and jury favorite.

=== Oman ===
The Muscat International Film Festival, now in its eighth year, showcases films and filmmakers from more than 90 countries. In addition to film premieres and screenings, seminars, workshops and awards shows round out the event.

=== Palestine ===
- Palestine Film Festival - Australia established 2008
- Boston Palestine Film Festival, established 2007
- Chicago Palestine Film Festival, established 2001
- DC Palestinian Film and Arts Festival, established 2011
- Al Ard Film Festival, established 2002

=== Qatar ===
The Doha Tribeca Film Festival was launched in 2009 through a cultural partnership between Doha Film Institute and Tribeca Enterprises, a diversified global media company based in New York City. The annual five-day event - a "celebration of film, education and community" - promotes Arab and international film and helps develop a sustainable film industry in Qatar.

=== Saudi Arabia ===
The Saudi Film Festival takes place every year, and is in its 6th edition in 2020 with its first online film festival in light of the COVID-19 pandemic. A handful of notable Saudi filmmakers exists and in 2012 the first female Saudi filmmaker released the first critically acclaimed feature film filmed entirely in Saudi Arabi, Wadjda, at the Cannes Film Festival. Red Sea International Film Festival in the coastal city of Jeddah was launched in 2019.

=== Syria ===
Established in 1979, the Damascus International Film Festival is a biannual film festival hosted by the government of Syria. The festival was established by the late Syrian film director Muhammad Shahin and alternates with the Carthage Film Festival in Tunisia. Since 2011, however, the film festival has been cancelled until further notice due to the crisis in Syria.

=== United Arab Emirates ===
The now defunct Abu Dhabi Film Festival was created in 2007 and presented works by Arab filmmakers in competition alongside those by major talents of world cinema. It was presented each October, the festival curated "exceptional programs to engage and educate the local community, inspire filmmakers and nurture the growth of the regional film industry." It was unfortunately brought to a close after eight editions in 2015.

The Dubai International Film Festival, was held each December since 2004, showcases new and exciting cinema from the Arab world, and other countries in Asia, Africa and beyond. It aimed to promote better cultural understanding through achievements in film. The DIFF has also pioneered several industry initiatives within its Dubai Film Market, which runs concurrently with the festival and is designed to help support and develop the Arab cinema industry. The 2018 festival was officially cancelled and the management announced that it would return in 2019 with a "new approach".

The Gulf Film Festival took place annually in Dubai. Held in April, the festival presented the best in cinema from the Persian Gulf region. Festival organizers recently announced the formation of the Gulf Film Market, an initiative aimed at developing local and regional film culture through mentoring and social networks. The market will also help create more opportunities for Gulf filmmakers in training, development, production and distribution. The festival was 'postponed' in 2014 and it never returned.

Tropfest Arabia, a short film festival, debuted in 2011 in Abu Dhabi. The festival aims to support emerging talent that might otherwise be excluded from the region's film festivals. Tropfest Arabia is a part of Tropfest, the largest short film festival in the world and what many consider the first truly global festival.

== Arab film festivals abroad ==
A large and growing number of Arab film festivals take place outside of the Arab world. These festivals play a key role in increasing access to and interest in Arab cinema outside of the Arab world. They are also important for Arab diasporas eager to stay in touch with the cultural scene of their homelands.

Established in California in 1996, the Arab Film Festival is the largest independent annual exhibition of Arab films in the United States. It is regarded as one of the most important Arab film festivals outside of the Arab world. The official mission of the festival is to "enhance public understanding of Arab culture and to provide alternative representations of Arabs that contradict the stereotypical images frequently encountered in the American mass media." The festival shows films from and about the Arab world in order to furnish audiences with realistic images of Arab culture, art, history, people and politics.

Amal Euroarab Film Festival was born in 2003 in Santiago de Compostela, Spain. It is developed by Araguaney-Bridge between Cultures Foundation and directed by Ghaleb Jaber Martínez. Amal means "hope" in Arab language, the hope that Arab world needs more than ever. Amal Festival seeks to promote the development of co-productions between Galicia and Spain and Arab countries, building cross-cultural bridges.

The London Middle East & North Africa Film Festival, created in 2011, provides an annual platform for filmmakers to showcase their work and reach audiences who might not otherwise get the opportunity to view cinema from the region, stimulating cross-cultural dialogue, connection and understanding.

Also in London, the annual London Palestine Film Festival was established in 1998, making it the UK's longest-running festival specialising in film from and upon any region of the Arab world. Providing a platform for international as well as Palestinian film, the festival takes place in Spring and is managed by UK-based non-profit the Palestine Film Foundation. It combines screenings, artists' talks, and panel discussions, with art exhibitions, conferences, and book launches.

The Middle Eastern Film Festival NYC, produced by Media Space NYC, aims to entertain and enlighten moviegoers with both short and feature-length films related to the Middle East. It is an extension of the Noor Play Festival.

The Sofia Middle East & North Africa Region Film Festival is an annual Arab/Islamic event in the Balkans, presenting films from the Middle East and North Africa to a Bulgarian audience. Since its inception in 2009, the festival has screened more than 120 titles.

Malmö Arab Film Festival (MAFF), founded in 2011 has rapidly grown to be one of the major yearly manifestations of Arab film outside the Arab World. The founder, Mouhamad Keblawi, is also managing director. Thirteen prices are awarded yearly.

In addition, a number of Arab film festivals abroad focus specifically on the issue of Palestine. Events such as the Boston Palestine Film Festival, Toronto Palestine Film Festival, Houston Palestine Film Festival and Chicago Palestine Film Festival bring Palestinian and Palestine-related cinema, narratives and culture to a dispersed audience.

== Latin America ==
1.1 LatinArab International Film Festival

The Latin Arab International Film Festival has been held yearly for the last seven years in the City of Buenos Aires. The only festival of its kind in the American continent, it has grown into a platform where to meet and promote Arab cinema and where to build a bridge and bring together the Latin American and Arab cultures, as they have so much in common. The festival's venues are public theatres Cine.Ar and el cultural San Martín and the Alliance Francaise. At the same time, LatinArab's industry Forum (The Latin Arab Co-Production Forum), held within the frame of the Mar del Plata International Film Festival, aims at potentiating both regions' film industries with the conception of films carried out as co-productions.

== Notable films ==
Arab film festivals sometimes serve as forums for political and cultural statements. In 2003, for instance, the Egyptian Cinema production Egyptian filmmaker Khaled El-Hagar presented his controversial Girls' Love, the story of a love affair between an Egyptian man and a Jewish woman.

More recently, films screened and/or competing at the festivals have reflected the Arab Spring. The 2012 Dubai International Film Festival showcased Hinde Boujemaa's It was Better Tomorrow, in which a homeless woman and her son live hand to mouth, squatting in apartments left empty by fleeing multinationals. Another documentary, True Story of Love, Life Death and Sometimes Revolution by Nidal Hassan, gathers the views and testimonies of Syrian women during the Syrian revolution.
