= The Gaza Tribunal =

Non-governmental tribunal in London, United Kingdom

The Gaza Tribunal was a non-governmental tribunal and public inquiry in London which sought to bring together evidence of the alleged complicity of the United Kingdom in what its organisers regarded as Israeli war crimes amounting to genocide during the Gaza war. Held on 4 and 5 September 2025 in Church House, Westminster, it was hosted by Jeremy Corbyn's Peace & Justice Project and two British-based academics. It was attended by doctors and surgeons who had attended patients in Gaza such as Nick Maynard, plus Palestinian journalists, lawmakers and campaigners, as well as United Nations special rapporteur on human rights Francesca Albanese.

== Background ==
Though at the time of the tribunal the United Kingdom had imposed a partial embargo on arms sales to Israel, sanctioned Israeli ministers Itamar Ben-Gvir and Bezalel Smotrich, suspended negotiations concerning a trade treaty and conditionally promised to recognise a Palestinian state at the end of September, the UK was continuing to produce F-35 fighter parts for the Israeli army. Pro-Palestine activists questioned the level of intelligence that British services were exchanging with their Israel.

=== Gaza (Independent Public Inquiry) Bill ===
On 4 June 2025, Jeremy Corbyn, former leader of the UK Labour Party and lifelong supporter of Palestinian rights, who was in the process of launching a new left-wing party, tabled a bill in the House of Commons which called for an independent inquiry into the UK's involvement in Israeli military operations in Gaza, including the supply of weapons, surveillance aircraft and the use of Royal Air Force bases. 22 non-governmental organisations working in Palestine, led by ActionAid, supported the bill. Their statement said that "it is increasingly urgent to confirm whether the UK has contributed to any violations of international humanitarian law through economic or political cooperation with the Israeli government since October 2023, including the sale, supply or use of weapons, surveillance aircraft and Royal Air Force bases." They also called for the establishment of an independent public inquiry in the case of the bill being struck down. The bill received backing by dozens of MPs, but was blocked by the ruling Labour Party.

In response, Corbyn stated that "If the government won't organise a public open inquiry, if Parliament won't effectively inquire into what's going on, it remains for us to do it." He thus organised the Gaza Tribunal, to be hosted by his Peace & Justice Project. The tribunal was set to be held at Church House in Westminster, close to 10 Downing Street, on 4 and 5 September 2025. At the Edinburgh Festival Fringe during an interview with musician Calum Baird, Corbyn announced the involvement of United Nations special rapporteur Francesca Albanese on 23 August, and said the inquiry would seek answers on the use of RAF Akrotiri concerning the war in Gaza, as well as other issues. He compared the tribunal to the Chilcot inquiry into the Iraq War.

=== UK Lawyers for Israel accusation ===
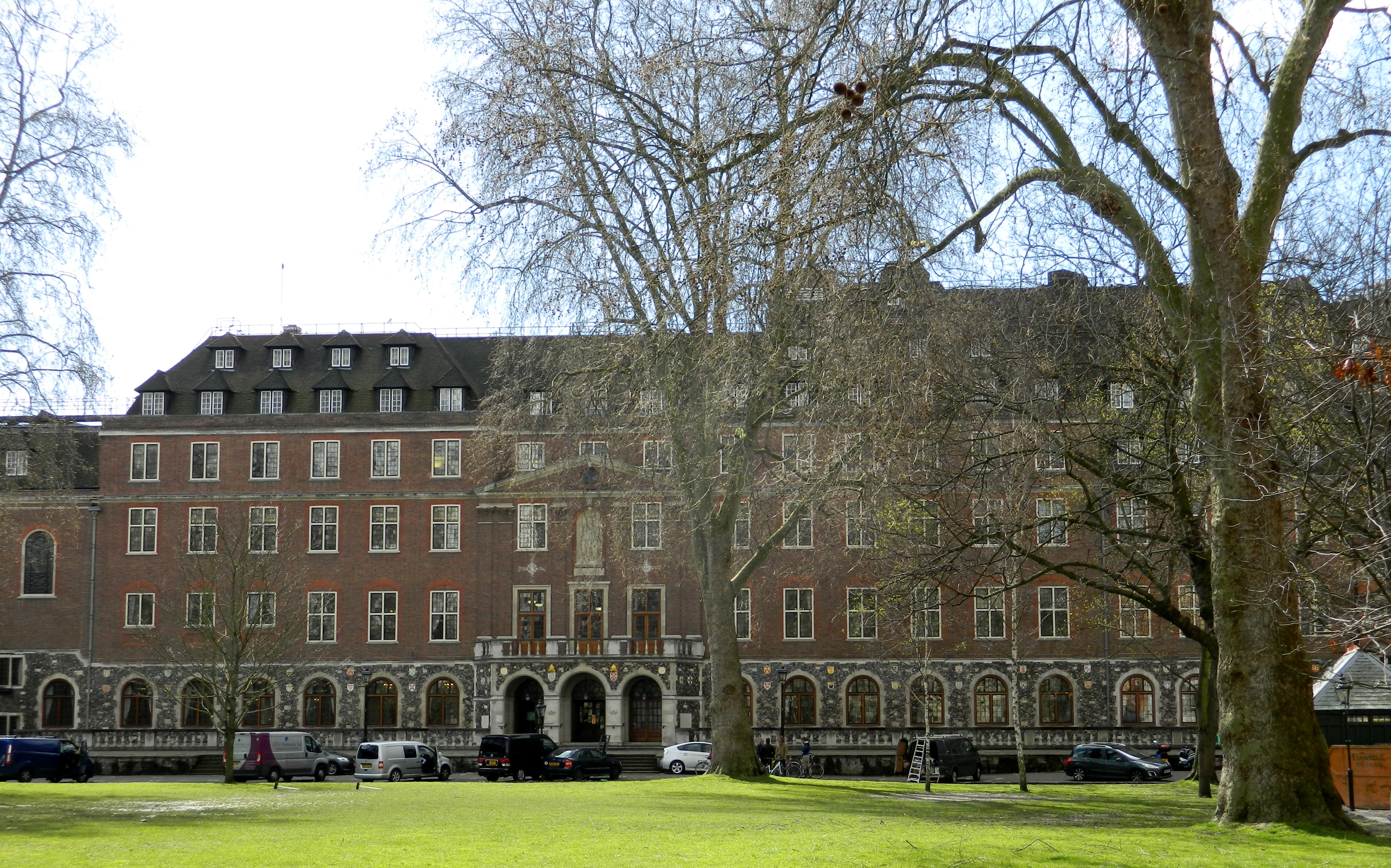
The Gaza Tribunal was held in Church House, Westminster.

Church House is home to the General Synod of the Church of England; just prior to the beginning of the tribunal, UK Lawyers for Israel accused the tribunal of "racial prejudice" for stating it would "establish the full scale of our government's complicity in the genocide against the Palestinian people". The advocacy group claimed that the United Nations special rapporteur on human rights Francesca Albanese, who was due to participate in the tribunal, had made antisemitic remarks. The group argued that as a result, according to what it claimed was Church House's "ethical lettings policy according to which it does not let to groups that promote racial prejudice", it should cancel the tribunal. A spokesperson for the Corporation of Church House said that the house was independent of the Church of England, and that the tribunal organisation had been reviewed against its organisational values.

== Tribunal ==
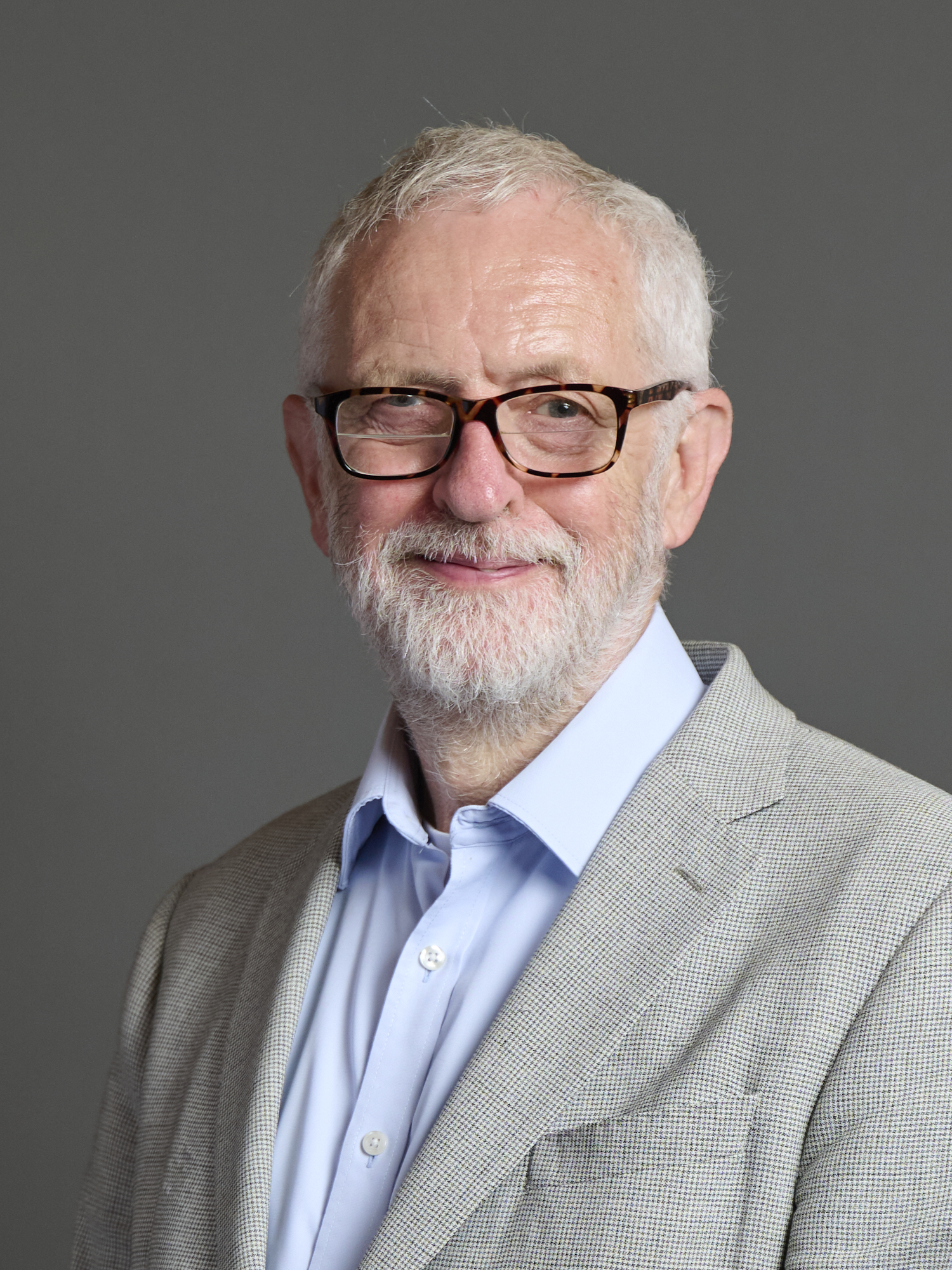
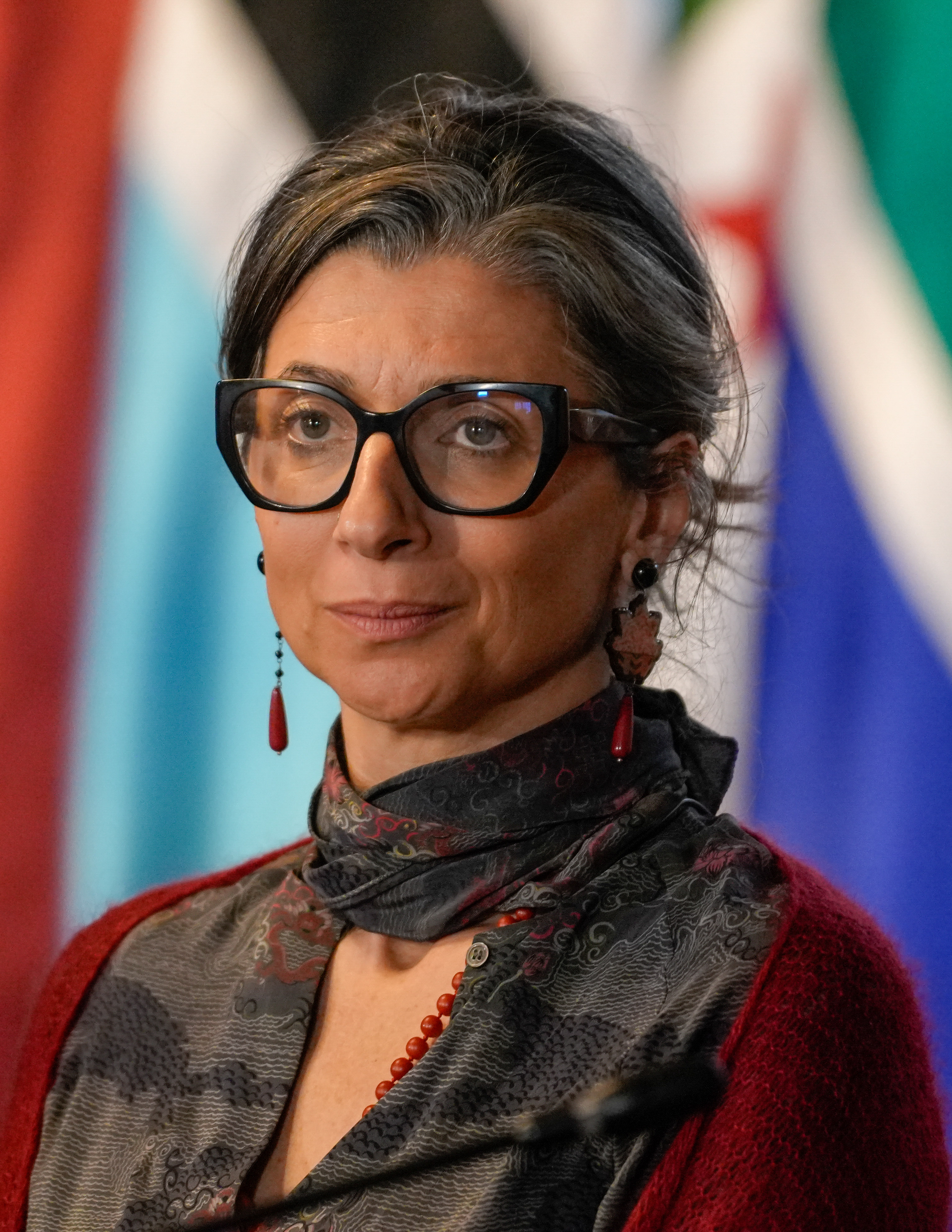
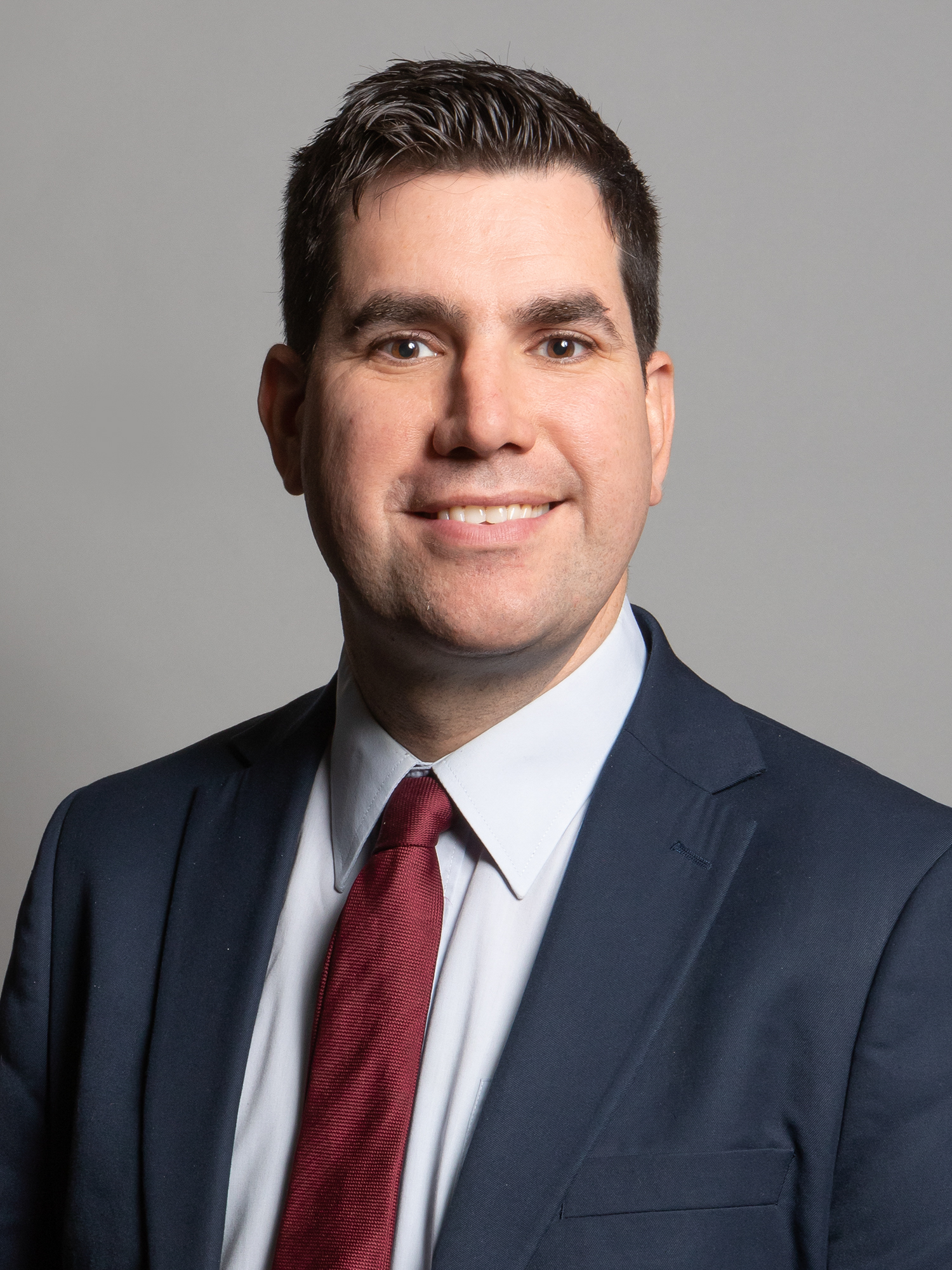
Jeremy Corbyn, Francesca Albanese, and Richard Burgon (left to right) participated in the tribunal.

The tribunal was hosted by Jeremy Corbyn and two British-based academics. 29 witnesses spoke. Attendees included doctors and surgeons who had attended patients in Gaza such as Nick Maynard, plus Palestinian journalists, as well as United Nations Rapporteur on human rights Francesca Albanese. Lawmakers included Labour lawmaker Richard Burgon. Mark Smith, a former diplomat and whistleblower who had resigned over the UK's failure to stop sending arms to Israel, the family of killed World Food Kitchen aid worker Jim Henderson who was killed on 1 April 2024, represented by lawyer Forz Khan, Palestinian journalists including Abubaker Abed and Yousef Alhelou, and Israeli historian Dr Raz Segal, were also scheduled to speak. The tribunal's framing covered events in Gaza over the past two years, Britain's legal responsibilities, evidence of British covert support for Israel, and whether the government's actions matched legal obligations to prevent a genocide. It was broadcast live on YouTube.

The tribunal was opened by Corbyn, who said that "the truth needs to be told and information needs to be provided and if parliament won't effectively inquire into what is going on, then the tribunal might be able to do so."

Professor Nick Maynard spoke, stating that it was "inconceivable to [him] that [hospital in Gaza] are being used as Hamas command centres," that health workers in Gaza were being deliberately targeted, and that Israeli soldiers had used the Gaza Humanitarian Foundation distribution points to undertake target practice on specific parts of teenage bodies including their testicles, chest and abdomen.

Doctor Victoria Rose, a consultant plastic surgeon at St Thomas' Hospital in London who had travelled to Gaza three times, recounted that she has operated on children under 10 without anaesthetic. She said that the Israeli government was refusing 60% to 90% of medical volunteers entry to Gaza, that it had banned the volunteers from bringing in basic medicine or equipment into Gaza, and that it would occasionally debar a medical team as they waited to cross the border from Jordan. She said she had lost half a stone in her 28 days treating patients there.

Francesca Albanese, United Nations Rapporteur on human rights, said that the British government had failed in its obligation to end the occupation of Palestine that had been declared illegal in July 2024. She said that UK government officials could be held individually responsible if they were found to have continued economic ties, arms transfers or intelligence exchange with Israel.

Charlotte Andrews-Briscoe, a lawyer for Palestinian human rights group Al-Haq who is acting in the UK court challenge into the handling of arms exports controls to Israel, argued that the UK Foreign Office had passed all allegations of war crimes to Israel, “setting in motion a circular reasoning, which saw the government repeatedly give perpetrators of these atrocities the opportunity not to incriminate themselves”.

Allegations made throughout the tribunal included that RAF pilots flying from the UK Akrotiri airbase in Cyprus systematically shared intelligence in real time with the Israel Defense Forces (IDF), but not with the International Criminal Court (ICC), that the government had failed to provide the support requested by lawyers acting for Jim Henderson, that Britain provided no support to chief ICC prosecutor Karim Khan after the US government imposed sanctions that led a British bank to close his account, and that the UK trade department continued to allow the import of products from Israel-occupied territories after the International Court of Justice ruled in an advisory opinion in July 2024 that the occupation was unlawful.

== Reactions ==
Prior to the tribunal, The Guardian stated that the tribunal would be "a thorn in [UK Prime Minister] Keir Starmer's side as his party seeks to retain the backing of leftwing and Muslim voters at the next election."
