= Bader Alhomoud =

Saudi Arabian film director and screenwriter

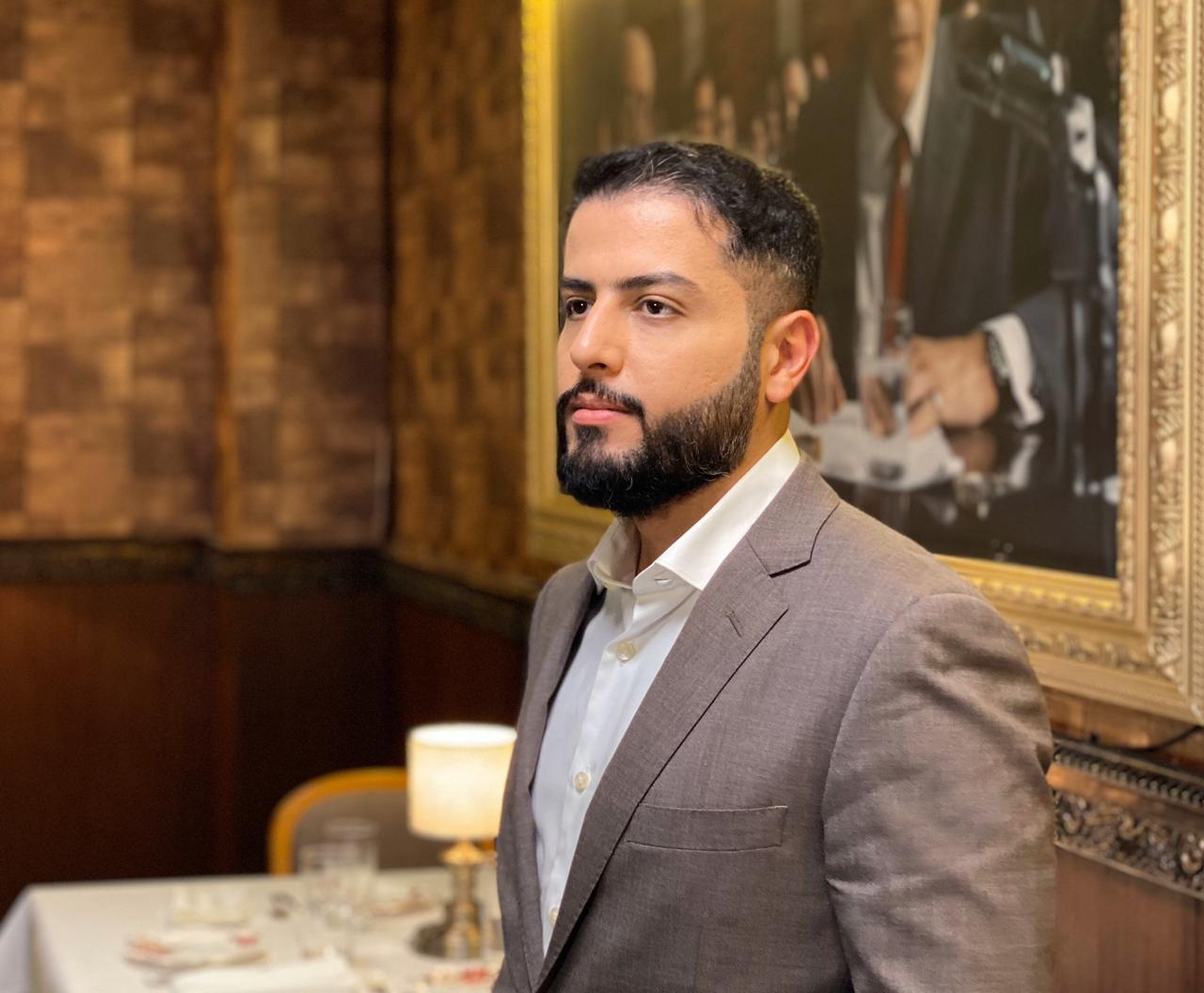
- Born: 1985 (age 40–41); Eastern Province, Saudi Arabia
- Occupations: Film director, screenwriter
- Years active: 2008 – present

Bader Alhomoud (Arabic: بدر الحمود) is a Saudi Arabian film director and screenwriter.

== Career ==
Alhomoud started directing films in 2008. He directed the film The Bliss of Being No One, which won many awards including Best Muhr Gulf Short at Dubai International Film Festival, the Special Jury Prize at the Beirut International Film Festival and Best Script award at Saudi Film Festival. The film has been screened in numerous festivals such as the Gulf Film Festival, Dubai International Film Festival, Abu Dhabi Film Festival and has won other awards. His film Monopoly, which discusses the housing situation in Saudi Arabia, has made an effective social impact on YouTube.

== Selected filmography ==
- White & White (2008)
- Shorood (2009)
- Daken (2010)
- Monopoly (2011)
- Karwah (2012)
- Book of Sand (2013)
- Pen of Mirrors (2014)
- Scrap (2015)
- The Bliss of Being No One (2017)
