= Life support (disambiguation) =

Life support is a set of therapies for preserving a patient's life when essential body systems are not functioning sufficiently to sustain life.

Life support may also refer to:

- Advanced cardiac life support, urgent treatment for life-threatening emergencies
- Basic life support, prehospital care provided by trained responders
- Life support (aviation), the field centered on ensuring the safety of aircrew
- Life-support system, the technologies used in human spaceflight, saturation diving and crewed submersibles

== Arts and media ==
=== Television and films ===
- "Life Support" (Star Trek: Deep Space Nine), third-season episode of Star Trek: Deep Space Nine
- Life Support (Australian TV series), Australian television comedy
- Life Support (British TV series), a 1999 British medical drama
- Life Support (2007 film), an American drama television film
- Life Support (2026 film), a documentary film on the Gaza war

=== Music ===
- A song in the Jonathan Larson musical Rent
- Life Support (Air Supply album), 1979
- Life Support (Madison Beer album), 2021
- "Life Support" (song), by YoungBoy Never Broke Again, 2021
