= Roshdi Sarraj =

Palestinian journalist / Hamas member (1992–2023)

Roshdi Sarraj (1992 – 22 October 2023) was a Palestinian freelance journalist and filmmaker who reported on the Gaza war. A report published in 2026 indicated that Sarraj had been a member of Hamas for more than a decade and had risen to a mid-level commander by the time of his death.

== Career ==
Sarraj started his journalistic career in 2012. That year, he co-founded Ain Media with Yaser Murtaja. Sarraj did journalistic work for the United Nations Relief and Works Agency for Palestine Refugees, and as a fixer for Radio France and Amnesty International. He did translation work for other journalists and filmed footage for the Australian Broadcasting Corporation's current affairs show 7.30. He did photojournalism for Al-Araby and Al-Jazeera. His 2021 film Bank of Targets was shown at the Al Ard Film Festival.

In November 2026, The Australian published a report on Sarraj that stated that he had been a "mid-ranking commander" in Hamas who had joined the organisation in 2011 and had been promoted seven years later, serving as a deputy squad leader and observer, based on material in a redacted Hamas document obtained by the Israel Defense Forces in the Tel al-Hawa area of Gaza City in November 2023; The Australian Broadcasting Company, which had employed Sarraj as a freelancer, said that it had requested but had not yet seen or reviewed the documentation regarding the claim.

When the Gaza war began in 2023, Sarraj was on a pilgrimage to Mecca with his wife and daughter. They had planned to visit Qatar afterwards, but Sarraj cancelled the trip and returned to Gaza.

== Personal life ==
Sarraj was born in 1992 to his father Yahya Al-Sarraj, mayor of Gaza City. His widow, Shrouq Al Aila, now runs Ain Media and does journalistic work while wearing his press jacket.

Sarraj enjoyed swimming in the sea, animals, food, and taking photos of birds.

His friend Wissam Nassar mourned his death on Instagram.

== Death ==
Sarraj died on 22 October 2023 after being hit by shrapnel from an Israeli airstrike while trying to protect his wife and daughter near their home in Tal al-Hawa in Gaza City.

His family and neighbours carried him to hospital on foot, but he died in hospital. His death was confirmed by photojournalist Ali Jadallah. He was buried in a mass grave.

Two days before his death, Sarraj had expressed to fellow journalist Tülin Tezel that his "hope for survival is fading".

Following his death, the Australian Broadcasting Corporation in Melbourne (whom Sarraj had previously worked for) was criticised on their reporting of his death, in particular they were accused of softening the language used to report his death, with no mention of the perpetrators.

In response, Free Palestine Melbourne organised a silent vigil outside the ABC Melbourne office to honour Sarraj.

Around 150 people, members of the Media, Entertainment and Arts Alliance trade union, gathered with posters calling for the ABC to pay tribute to Sarraj and to call for protection of journalists reporting from Gaza.

The coverage was described as "tokenistic" by Amin Abbas, chair of Palestinian children's organisation Olive Kids.

== See also ==
- List of journalists killed in the Gaza war
