= Wissam Nassar =

Palestinian photojournalist (born 1984)

- وسّام نصّار
- Born: 1984 (age 41–42); Gaza, Palestine
- Education: Islamic University of Gaza
- Occupation: Photojournalist

Wissam Nassar (born 1984) is a Palestinian photojournalist.

== Career ==
Nassar studied journalism at the Islamic University in Gaza. He started his career covering Israeli-Hamas wars in 2008. Nassar, along with Tyler Hicks and Sergey Ponomarev, was a finalist for the 2015 Pulitzer Prize for Breaking News Photography for his 2014 photography in Gaza. His 2018 photo of a young woman in Palestine with a crutch and slingshot hurling stones at Israeli troops has been compared to the biblical story of David and Goliath. Nassar has worked for the New York Times and Deutsche Presse-Agentur. As of 2025, he had 1.7million followers on Instagram.

== Personal life ==
Nassar was born in 1984 in Gaza, where he still lives and works. He and his family are refugees. Nassar was friends with fellow journalist Roshdi Sarraj.
