= Daniele Rugo =

Italian documentary filmmaker

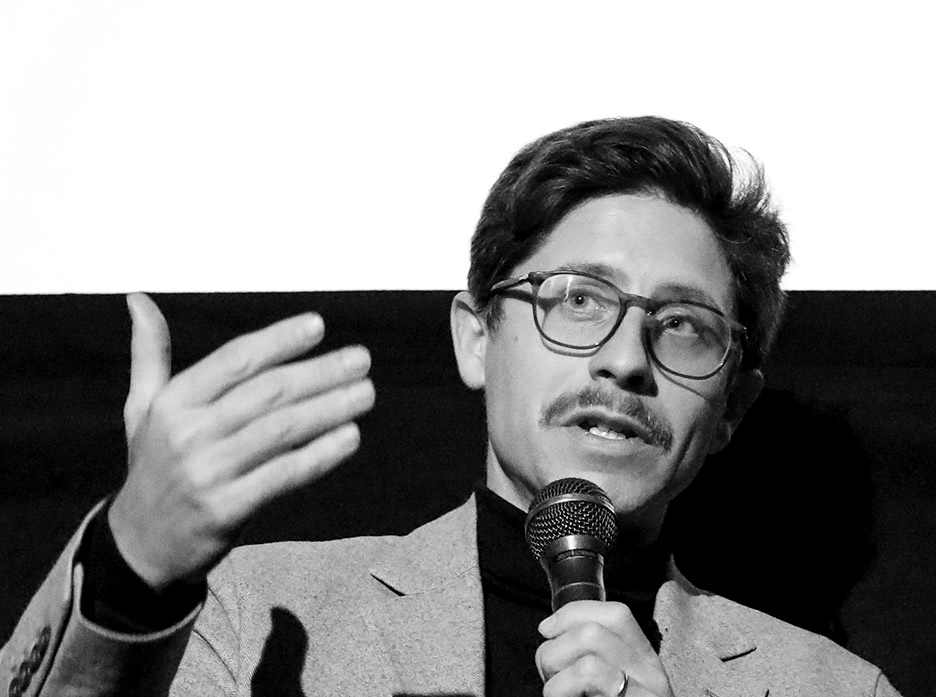
Daniele Rugo in 2019

Daniele Rugo (born 1982, Acqui Terme, Italy) is an Italian documentary filmmaker and author.

His new film – Life Support – premiered at Sheffield DocFest in 2026 and is produced by Susan Sarandon, Melissa Barrera, and Farah Nabulsi.It has also been at Zurich Film Festival and Doha Film Festival and has been longlisted for BIFA Best Feature Documentary. Q&As have featured Robert Del Naja (Massive Attack), Joe Talbot (IDLES), Gary Lineker and Khalid Abdalla.

== Filmography ==
- Life Support (2026)
- The Soil and The Sea (2023)
  - Special Mention of the Jury, Al Ard Film Festival 20th Edition
  - Soundrive Motion Award 'Best Sound', Soleluna Doc Festival 19th Edition
- About a War (co-directed with Abi Weaver) (2019)
  - Best Documentary Feature, Lebanese Independent Film Festival
- The Olympic Side of London (2012)
