= Shrouq Al Aila =

Palestinian journalist

- Occupation: Journalist
- Known for: Running Ain Media; Recipient of the CPJ International Press Freedom Award (2024)
- Spouse: Roshdi Sarraj (deceased)
- Awards: CPJ International Press Freedom Award (2024)

Shrouq Al Aila is a Palestinian journalist. Aila runs Ain Media, which she took over after her husband Roshdi Sarraj died in the Gaza War. She was awarded the CPJ International Press Freedom Award in 2024.
