= Nick Maynard =

British gastrointestinal surgeon

Nick Maynard FRCS
- Born: Nicholas David Maynard; April 1962 (age 64)
- Education: Exeter College, Oxford; King's College London
- Board member of: Medical Aid for Palestinians (chair)
- Medical career
- Profession: Medical consultant and surgeon
- Field: Gastroenterology
- Institutions: Guy's Hospital; Oxford University Hospital; Al Aqsa Hospital
- Research: Oesophageal cancer
- Awards: Humanitarian Medal (2025)
- Website: professornickmaynard.co.uk

Nicholas David Maynard (born April 1962) is a British surgeon who works as a consultant gastrointestinal surgeon at Oxford University Hospital. He is also known for his humanitarian works in Gaza, having taken many trips to the region between 2010 and 2025, and is prominently featured in the 2026 Gaza documentary Life Support.

== Early life and education ==
Maynard was born in April 1962. He attended the now defunct Downside School in Purley and then The King's School, Canterbury. He matriculated at Exeter College, Oxford in 1980 and graduated with a Bachelor of Arts in Physiological Sciences in 1983. He received further clinical training at Guy's Hospital Medical School (part of King's College London and earned his Bachelor of Medicine, Bachelor of Surgery degree in 1986. He earned his Master of Surgery qualification from University of London in 1993 and became a Fellow of the Royal College of Surgeons in 1997.

== Medical career ==
Before being appointed to Oxford University Hospital in 1997, Maynard had worked at various hospitals in South East England in addition to spending two years as a Senior Registrar in Melbourne before returning to Guy's Hospital. He is a lecturer of Clinical Medicine at Corpus Christi College, Oxford.

=== Cancer care and research ===
Maynard is based at the Oxford University Hospitals NHS Foundation Trust and has held senior positions, which include leading cancer care provision at the trust. As an academic, he has co-authored studies on oesophageal cancer treatment published across peer-reviewed journals.

Maynard is a trustee of the Oxfordshire Oesophageal and Stomach Organisation (OOSO), a charity that provides support to oesophageal cancer patients and their families in the county. In 2015, he and other doctors in Oxfordshire took part in a 10-day charity bike ride to raise money for the charitable organisation.

In 2019, he opposed the plan to privatise cancer screening by outsourcing the PET-CT service, which had been provided by Oxford's Churchill Hospital, to the private firm InHealth. He said that the move would lead to "inferior quality scans" and "a less safe service" for the people of Oxfordshire.

=== Humanitarian work ===
Maynard first visited the West Bank in 2007 and has since then taken many trips back to the region as well as to Gaza for humanitarian works. In particular, he has organised annual trips that take Oxford doctors to Palestine to train Palestinian medical students from Al Quds University in the West Bank and the Islamic University of Gaza and Al Azhar University in Gaza.

A longtime volunteer with Medical Aid for Palestinians, in 2023, he was asked by the charity to lead the UK's first Emergency Medicine Team to provide humanitarian response to the Gaza genocide.

After returning from Gaza in January 2024, he told media of a dire humanitarian situation and the collapse of the healthcare system. Maynard has called for a ceasefire to end the violence. Also, in 2024, Maynard said that Israel was engaged in the "deliberate targeting of doctors, of nurses, and of hospitals". In a 2025 interview with Sky News, Maynard said that the IDF was shooting Palestinian civilians at aid points "almost like a game of target practice". He was interviewed by conservative commentator Tucker Carlson on the Tucker Carlson Show on May 28, 2026. He has written op-eds for the Guardian, and Middle East Eye and is one of the doctors featured in the 2026 Gaza documentary Life Support.

Maynard joined the trustee board of Medical Aid for Palestinians as its chair in 2025.

== Awards and recognition ==
Maynard was awarded the Humanitarian Medal by King Charles III in February 2025 for his work in Gaza.

== Personal life ==
Maynard resides with his wife in Oxfordshire.
