= Life Support (2026 film) =

- Directed by: Daniele Rugo
- Produced by: William Parry
- Cinematography: Mahmoud Abou Hamda; Suleiman Hejjy
- Edited by: Masahiro Hirakubo
- Music by: Robert Del Naja; Euan Dickinson; Habib Shehada Hanna
- Production companies: Cocoonfilms; Metafora Production; Pressure Cooker Arts
- Distributed by: Dartmouth Films
- Release dates: 13 June 2026 (Sheffield DocFest); 10 July 2026 (United Kingdom and Ireland)
- Running time: 93 minutes
- Countries: United Kingdom, Palestine, Qatar
- Language: English
- Box office: $62k

Life Support is a 2026 British-Palestinian-Qatari documentary film on the Gaza war from the perspective of international doctors volunteering in Gaza hospitals.

== Synopsis ==
The film features testimonies from 10 doctors, among them gastrointestinal surgeon Nick Maynard (Oxford University Hospital), reconstructive surgeon Victoria Rose (King's College Hospital, London) and Canadian intensive-care paediatrician and regular Doctors Without Borders volunteer Tanya Haj-Hassan. They speak of their medical work in Gaza hospitals while serving on missions lasting several weeks or months, carried out in 2024 and 2025 on behalf of NGOs like British charity Medical Aid for Palestinians.

The doctors describe the difficulties involved in bringing medical supplies into the Gaza strip. This became progressively more difficult as the war progressed. Israeli authorities are said to have routinely confiscated baby formula at the border, and when staff are forcibly removed from a hospital by the Israeli army, severely ill infants are left behind unattended to die. One doctor describes the suffering of Palestinian cancer patients caused by the lack of painkillers as "torture".

Documentary footage shot on the ground shows damage to Gaza hospitals, the shortage of facilities and beds leading to patients with severe injuries being treated in the most basic way on hospital floors. British doctor James Smith says the injuries of Gaza patients ”are the most horrific things I've seen as an emergency doctor". In addition to burnt or mangled limbs and faces there are children suffering internal injuries from shockwaves that leave them outwardly unblemished but with their organs damaged so badly that they cannot survive.

Doctors say they observed clusters of gunshot wounds that gave them the impression that Israeli snipers focused on different body parts on different days as a kind of sport. They say the lack of food in Gaza severely reduces survival chances of patients after operations. Doctors share their impression that medical and other infrastructure in Gaza was systematically targeted, with only one hospital allowed to be operational at any one time. Oxford University Hospital surgeon Nick Maynard says he has never seen evidence of Hamas presence in hospitals, despite having full access to every room.

The doctors describe heroic work by their Palestinian colleagues, who work to the point of passing out from extreme hunger and while suffering personal trauma due to deaths within their own families. One doctor speaks of a Palestinian colleague who brought her teenage children with her to work, arguing that this way, if they die, they will at least die together.

Doctors say on multiple occasions that they experience profound guilt leaving their colleagues in Gaza behind. They voice the opinion that events in Gaza constitute ethnic cleansing or genocide, but insist that at this time it should be more important to focus on the basic illegality of what is happening and stopping it than on the correct legal definition.

British surgeon Ana Jeelani speaks of doctors being the "eyes of the world", given that Israel does not allow any other independent observers or journalists to enter the Gaza strip, creating a duty for doctors to speak out.

== Concept ==
According to director Daniele Rugo, the aim of the film is to share an account of doctors' experiences working in Gaza, given that "the doctors were some of the very, very few international independent eyewitnesses that were allowed into Gaza. We tried as much as possible for the voices of the doctors to be the centre, the engine of the film, as well as their emotional journey."

== Production ==
External media (UN.org)
- Video and transcript of the 26 November 2024 United Nations testimony by Canadian intensive-care paediatrician Tanya Haj-Hassan, excerpts of which are featured in Life Support.

The doctors mostly speak direct to camera, seated in front of a plain grey backdrop. Their testimony is interspersed with on-the-ground video diaries, footage of airstrikes and sequences shot within hospitals.

The film also features excerpts from the November 2024 UN testimony by Tanya Haj-Hassan.

The film was executive produced by Susan Sarandon, Farah Nabulsi, Paul Weller, Dale Vince, Asif Kapadia and Melissa Barrera. It features a voiceover reading by Irish actress Denise Gough. Massive Attack's Robert Del Naja contributed to the soundtrack.

== Release ==
Life Support had its world premiere on 13 June 2026 at Sheffield DocFest, where it was nominated for the Tim Hetherington Award and received a standing ovation. The film was released in UK and Irish cinemas on 10 July 2026 and had its German premiere in Berlin in October 2026. In addition to ongoing screenings featuring Q&As with the filmmakers, the film has also been made available for on-demand streaming on Apple TV, Prime Video, YouTube and Curzon.

== Soundtrack album ==
A soundtrack album featuring Robert Del Naja performing as 3D, Kneecap, Yasmine Hamdan, Habib Shehada Hanna, Massar Egbari, 47Soul, Aar Maanta and Siba and Monkyman was released on 28 October 2026, with profits from vinyl sales to go to a Health Workers 4 Palestine solidarity fund.

== Reception ==
The Financial Times' Danny Leigh wrote, "I wanted to walk out of Life Support many times. I mean that as the highest recommendation." He described the film as a "powerful and harrowing" documentary that was essential viewing and awarded five stars. India Lawrence said in her 4-star review for Time Out, "Life Support is forensic in its delivery. Understated, to-the-point and rational [...] It’s not a happy watch, but Life Support is an urgent and essential piece of reportage." Ken Loach deemed the documentary "compulsory viewing".

Jonathan Romney's review in The Observer said the film was "an incisive, timely watch", with the doctors describing malnutrition, destroyed hospitals and "the courage and tenacity of the local practitioners who they help". However, given that the film and many of its contributors viewed Israel’s policy in Gaza as genocide or ethnic cleansing, Romney was taken aback that the October 7 attacks were described merely as "a surprise attack" at one point in the film's voiceover, rather than as a "massacre". Andreas Busche, reporting in Der Tagesspiegel on the film's German premiere, described Life Support as "devastating": "In matter-of-fact terms, Tanya Haj-Hassan, Victoria Rose, Nick Maynard and Ana Jeelani describe their work under the most gruelling conditions: amputations carried out on hospital floors, people with mangled faces who can only be given basic treatment, and young children whose internal organs have been destroyed by the shockwaves of explosions."

Dave Calhoun said in Screen Daily that the doctors' testimony makes Life Support "a significant addition to the reporting on the war." Cath Clarke, awarding 4 stars in The Guardian, described the film as a "quietly devastating medics' eye view of the war in Gaza" and as "hard to watch but impossible to look away from." Nasim Ahmed, writing for Middle East Monitor, wrote, "Life Support does not try to make its subject easier to watch, and it should not. What it leaves you with is a record of who kept Gaza’s hospitals running, what it cost them, and how much of it the world chose not to see." Mansel Stimpson awarded five stars in Film Review Daily, deeming Life Support an "enormously significant documentary [that] examines the evidence disclosed by doctors in Gaza between 2023 and 2025". Kevin Maher's 4-star review in The Times likened Life Support to other hospital-based war documentaries like For Sama, The Cave and the Oscar-winning 20 Days in Mariupol. Maher said the documentary "skirts the ban on foreign journalists in the Gaza Strip, by asking a handful of volunteer doctors, mostly from the UK, to capture footage and disseminate the results." Having returned home with "stomach-churning and jaw-dropping footage from Gaza", the doctors – described by Maher as "highly articulate, educated, charismatic and serious people" – conclude "that they witnessed systematic war crimes and attempted genocide".
