= Mira Sidawi =

Palestinian filmmaker and writer

- Born: Beirut, Lebanon
- Citizenship: Germany
- Education: Lebanese American University
- Occupations: Actress, director, writer
- Children: 2

Mira Sidawi is a Palestinian actress, writer, and director.

== Early life and education ==
Sidawi was born to a Palestinian family in the Bourj el-Barajneh refugee camp on the outskirts of Beirut, Lebanon. She was named, by her mother, after an eponymous character played by actress Hind Abi Llama in a Lebanese television series.

Her father fled Sheij Danun, a town near Acre (today in northern Israel), in 1948 at the beginning of Nakba during which more than 700,000 palestinians were displaced after Zionist forces conquered territory to establish the State of Israel. After leaving his home with no belongings, he set up a storefront in the countryside where he met and married Sidawi’s mother, who was also from Acre.

The family was forced to flee to the mountains following the Lebanese civil war. “My father made a house of tin and stones, in which it was very cold in winter and we suffocated in summer,” Sidawi told El Pais, “We were very poor. I helped him clean other people's bathrooms by listening to Umm Kulthum's music. He was a fascinating man, who wanted to be a writer, but he couldn't. It is impossible to know what happened before, who he played with or what he dreamed of. You don't know what he left there, in that first part of his life.” Before he was killed, along with her sister, during the Israeli invasion of Lebanon in the 1980s, he taught Sidawi how to walk inside the refugee camp alleys without falling into open holes or being bitten by rats.

Sidawi studied theatre at the Lebanese American University and worked as a trainer in media workshops across the Shatilla refugee camp.

== Career ==
=== Film ===
Sidawi’s first short film Four Wheels Camp (2015) was conceived as a tribute to her father and showcases the plight of palestinian refugees who wish to be buried in their homeland instead of a camp. “My parents are buried on my two brothers, who died before, because in the countryside there is no place to bury otherwise. Dead on dead. It scares me to have no choice and end up like this. I told my mother that I didn't want that for me, and that's where the film was born,” she explained. Four Wheels Camp was selected to be screened at the Festival Ciné-Palestine in Paris and Beirut University Film Festival, winning the jury prize and the audience award respectively. In 2024, it was one of the films screened at the Academy of Cinematographic Arts and Sciences of Spain, as part of a colloquium organized by the Association of Women Filmmakers and Audiovisual Media (CIMA).

Sidawi’s second project, Al Jidar (transl. The Wall), was released in 2019 and follows young Palestinian refugees, living in Lebanon’s Shatila refugee camp, on their journey to persuade Pink Floyd’s Roger Waters to play a concert in their camp.

In 2023, Sidawi was among five filmmakers selected by filmlab Palestine and Cinephilia Productions to participate in the fourth edition of the Sunbird Stories program that aimed to support the development of “imaginative and thought-provoking short films” targeting Arabic-speaking children. Her resulting film The Bulldozer follows a young palestinian boy Ali and is set against the backdrop of a refugee camp.

Sidawi was one of the twenty three documentary filmmakers who received a 2025 grant from Arab Fund for Arts and Culture.

=== Theatre ===
Sidawi acted in several stage productions as a student at the Lebanon American University (LAU). In 2012, she appeared in Mathhab, adapted and directed by Lina Khoury. The play was based on Tom Stoppard’s Every Good Boy Deserves Favour. In 2017, she was seen in Ayyoubé, LAU’s alumni theatre production that was written and directed by Awad Awad.

In 2022, Sidawi appeared in the Arabic radio production for Ismail Khalidi’s play The Last Machine. The play was commissioned by Center for Palestine Studies, Columbia University for its NO PLACE/ LA MAKAN project. In 2025, she performed in an Médecins Sans Frontières production of Gaza – Aita ash Shab – Gaza at the Le Monnot Theatre in Beirut. The play, directed by Lina Abyad, showcased firsthand testimonies of women who have survived the occupation in Palestine and Lebanon.

=== Writing ===
In 2017, Sidawi was part of Beirut Short Stories, a collaboration between KfW Stiftung and the Goethe-Institut to promote young literary talent in the Middle East. The writers developed short stories under the guidance of industry veterans such as Abbas Khider and Dima Wannous. Selected entries including Sidawi’s “The Story of Nasr” about a Palestian refugee boy, were later translated and published in Arabic and English on adda (the online literary magazine by Commonwealth Foundation).

In 2018, Perla Issa, researcher and senior fellow at the Institute for Palestine Studies (IPS), conceptualized an autobiographical writing workshop for Palestinian refugees in Lebanon. Sidawi was one of the eleven people selected through an open call to attend twelve sessions of the Beirut-based workshop. The participants convened weekly to share manuscripts and explore other creative writing ideas under the guidance of Lebanese writer and journalist Hassan Daoud. In October 2022, IPS collaborated with OR Books to jointly publish 11 Lives: Stories from Palestinian Exile, a resulting anthology of participant contributions edited and translated from Arabic by Muhammad Ali Khalidi, presidential professor of philosophy at CUNY Graduate Center. Ghenwa Hayek, associate professor of modern arabic literature at University of Chicago, praised the book for bringing “vibrancy and vitality” to the stories of contemporary Palestinians that remind “the reader of the multitudinous experience of Palestinian refugees.” British playwright Caryl Churchill noted that the stories presented “vivid accounts of a world we know too little about.” Additionally, journalist-academic Moustafa Bayoumi said that the book was managed to unite the “indomitable spirit of Palestinian survival with the transformative potential of first-person narratives” through “a deeply humane, precisely detailed, and intimately drawn collection of refugee stories.”

Sidawi is currently working on her first book Tell Sleep to Sleep, which has received funding from Mophradat, a Brussels-based international nonprofit association that supports Arab artists.

== Personal life ==
After the Nakba, Israel disallowed the return of displaced palestinian refugees; as a result, Sidawi has never been to Acre. She has been outspoken about Israel’s occupation of Palestine, the ground realities of being a refugee, and the challenges of filmmaking as a Palestinian woman.

Sidawi divides her time between Lebanon and Berlin, Germany, where she lives with her husband and two children.
