= Jordan Short Film Festival =

Jordan Short Film Festival (JSFF)
- Festival logo
- Location: Amman, Jordan
- Founded: 2004
- Awards: Best Int'l Film, Best Arab Film
- Language: International
- Website: http://www.JordanFilmFestival.com

The Jordan Short Film Festival (JSFF) (مهرجان الأردن للفيلم القصير) (in Arabic) was established as an art film festival to provide a platform for indie filmmakers in Jordan and Arab world to showcase their films while keeping in touch with the latest development in the indie filmmaking movement world-wide. The JSFF is managed by the Amman Filmmakers Cooperative (AFC) a film collective based in Amman, Jordan.

== Overview ==
Founded in 2004 by Palestinian diaspora filmmaker Hazim M. Bitar, The Jordan Short Film Festival (JSFF) started as a short film cinema week to provide film aficionados in Jordan with an opportunity to screen Jordanian short films produced by the Amman Filmmakers Cooperative (AFC) and other Jordanian and Palestinian indie filmmakers. Later, the JSFF launched two main competitions: the International short film competition and the Arab short film competition. There are other competitions that take place parallel to the festival, such as the Mobile Phone Film Competition and All.Films.Look.Alike amateur filmmakers competition. The JSFF holds periodic screenings year-round in various areas of Jordan and in conjunction with other international festivals. The JSFF regularly partners with various cultural institutions such as the Shoman Foundation, Clermont-Ferrand Film Festival, French Cultural Center, Spanish Agency for Cultural Cooperation, and the Arab Fund for Arts and Culture (AFAC). The JSFF is Jordan's only competitive and nationally managed short film festival.

== Awards ==
Winners 2010
Daisy Cutter by Enrique García & Rubén Salazar (Best Int'l Film)
Flu by Riad Makdessi (Best Arab Film)
My House is Cloudy by Karim Azimi (Special Mention)
Alienation of Jerusalem by Saad Arouri (Special Mention)

Winners 2009
London-Gaza by Dima Abu Hamdan (Best Arab Film)
LoopLoop by Patrick Bergeron (Best Int'l Film)

Winners 2008
Solitude by Mehrdad Sheikhan (Best Int'l Film)
Bent Maryam by Saed Salmin Almerry (Best Arab Film)
François Delaive in the short film Abattoir (Special Mention for Best Actor)
Dominique Loisos in the short film Bonfire (Special Mention for Best Actress)
Hazim Bitar & Rifqi Assaf in the short film The View (Special Mention for Best Script)
Colin Bell in the short film Leap Year (Special Mention for Cinematography)
Justice of Vengeance by Khaled Hlilat (Special Mention for First Film)

Winners 2007
The Life and Other Building Yards by Giuseppe Schettino (Best Int'l Film)
A Sheherazade Tale by Rami Kodeih (Best Arab Film)
For A Better World by Barbara Hlali (Special Mention - Best Script)
Sabah El Foll by Sherif Elbendary (Special Mention - Best Actress)
Abajee by Maureen Bharoocha (Special Mention - Best Actor)
Rabia's Journey by Mayar Roumi (Special Mention - Cinematography)
Humoresque by Diana Deleanu (Special Mention)
Mazari by Ahmad Sarraf Yazd (Special Mention)
Three Eyes by Rawan Zeine (Special Mention)

Winners 2006
Aan by Poopak Mozafari (Best Int'l Film)
Ahmad Suliman by Waleed Al Shehhi (Best Arab Film)
Willow Drive by Jakob Rovik (Special Mention)
Rainbow by Abdelsalam Shehadeh (Special Mention)

Winners 2005
Letter to Sarah by Mutaz Jankot (Audience Choice - No. 1 tie)
Overdose by Ammar Quttaineh (Audience Choice - No. 1 tie)
Tough Day by Amin Matalqa (Audience Choice - No. 2)
Three Ghettos One Land by Suhad Khatib (Audience Choice - No. 3)

Winners 2004
Non-Competitive film week.
