= Humanitarian Medal =

- Type: Service medal
- Awarded for: Humanitarian service
- Description: Nickel-silver, 36mm diameter
- Presented by: United Kingdom
- Eligibility: British forces and civilian personnel
- Post-nominals: None
- Campaigns: Humanitarian efforts in the UK and overseas
- Clasps: Morocco; Libya; Gaza
- Status: Currently awarded
- Established: July 2023
- First award: 18 February 2025
- Ribbon bar

The Humanitarian Medal is a British award intended to recognise the efforts of those involved in providing aid and support to human welfare during or in the aftermath of a humanitarian crisis. The medal is awarded to people that have responded to emergencies both in the United Kingdom or overseas.

== Background ==
In July 2023, a new award was instituted that would recognise the efforts of workers in various types of humanitarian crisis. This award was to be awarded to people employed by various organisations, including but not limited to the armed forces, civilian services, civilian health care organisations and charities.

== Description ==
The obverse of the medal features the effigy of the sovereign (King Charles III), while the reverse consists of a laurel wreath interwoven with a banner containing the words "For Humanitarian Service".

The medal ribbon, 1 1/4 inches (32 mm) wide, consists of a central white stripe, representing civilians and peace, with narrow stripes of red, light blue, dark blue and purple either side. The red stripe is intended to represent humanitarian organisations, light blue to represent the NHS, with the other two colours representing other services.

Similar to military awards such as the General Service Medal, the Humanitarian Medal will be awarded just once, with service undertaken for different situations recognised through the award of a clasp to the medal itself.

== Qualification ==
Qualification for award of the Humanitarian Medal comes under a range of different criteria:

- Level of Emergency - The medal is eligible to be awarded if the emergency is classed either as a Level 2 (Serious) (Note: Level 2 is an emergency that has or threatens to have a wide or prolonged impact requiring sustained support from central or regional government, or the devolved administrations.) or Level 3 (Catastrophic) (Note: Level 3 is an emergency with an exceptionally and widespread impact, requiring immediate support from central government.) emergency situation by the UK government.
- Individual eligibility - Individuals need to fulfil different criteria:
  - They need to have undertaken frontline service (direct contact with the affected group) during the emergency, been engaged in people-facing service (the response is focused on human welfare), or undertaking work in direct support of the population (delivering an operational outcome that directly impacts the affected population).
  - The service should be classed as either hazardous (operating in conditions that are unsafe, insecure or at heightened risk), sustained (long-term frontline service in an on-going situation) or significant (contribution characterised by a serious or immediate threat to life)
- Organisational eligibility - Only organisations deployed by, funded by or endorsed by the UK government are eligible to have individuals in their employ receive the award. There will be no nationality qualification for the medal.

In January 2025, the first humanitarian responses for which receipt of the medal was permitted were announced:

- Moroccan earthquake – in response to the Al Haouz earthquake on 8 September 2023, the British Embassy in Rabat initiated a crisis response lasting from 9 September to 19 September 2023. Individuals who took part in the UK government response to the earthquake in either the Marrakesh-Safi (Marrakesh, Al Haouz and Chichaoua provinces) or Souss-Massa (Taroudant province) regions, with a minimum service period of 48 hours were eligible to receive the medal with Morocco clasp.
- Libyan floods – in the wake of Storm Daniel on 10–11 September 2023, the Derna and Abu Mansour dams at Derna, Libya collapsed causing major floods to the Wadi Derna. The UK government provided an emergency response lasting from 11 September 2023 to 31 March 2024. Individuals taking part for a minimum of 14 days during this period, in an area stretching from Tobruk in the east to Bersis in the west, and from the Mediterranean coast in the north to Al Mkheley in the south, were eligible to receive the medal with Libya clasp.
- Gaza crisis – as a result of the Gaza war, the UK government has provided a response to the humanitarian crisis in Gaza. Individuals who have taken part in this response since 7 October 2023, with a minimum service period of 14 days, in either the Gaza Strip, Jerusalem, Ramallah, Egypt, Jordan or Cyprus, as well as maritime personnel operating in the Eastern Mediterranean, were eligible to receive the medal.

== See also ==
- Iraq Reconstruction Service Medal
- Civilian Service Medal (Afghanistan)
- Ebola Medal for Service in West Africa
