= Dima Hamdan =

Palestinian filmmaker and journalist

- ديما حمدان
- Born: 1975 (age 50); Kuwait
- Other name: Dima Abu Hamdan
- Occupations: Film maker, Journalist
- Years active: 1997–present

Dima Hamdan (Arabic: ديما حمدان; born 1975) is a Palestinian-Jordanian-British filmmaker and journalist based in Berlin. Her short film Blood Like Water (2023) won the 2024 Iris Prize.

== Early life ==
Hamdan was born in Kuwait to Palestinian parents. Her grandfather was displaced from Umm Khaled during the Nakba, while her mother was "driven out at gunpoint" from Tulkarem during the Naksa in 1967. Amid Gulf War, Hamdan moved with her family to Jordan. Hamdan studied Law at Jordanian university. In an interview by Shoot’n’Post, Hamdan mentioned that she always dreamt of becoming a film director since she was 12 or 13, but at the time there was not a prospect of her going to film school as her family expected her to become a lawyer. At university, she studied law, but never practiced it. She eventually found herself getting into journalism because she thought it would be a good opportunity to meet film directors and actors.

== Career ==
=== Journalism ===
Hamdan began her journalism career in 1997 working as a parliamentary cultural correspondent for The Jordan Times. During this she met directors and actors, which reinforced her early interest in filmmaking. She also contributed to Al-Hayat and the Middle East Times. In 2002, Hamdan joined the London office of BBC Arabic and BBC World Service. Hamdan reported from cities like Baghdad, Jerusalem, and Beirut. She worked for the network until 2014 as a reporter and producer. Hamdan noted that she valued being out on the street, collecting stories, and talking to people. She was influenced during her time as a journalist, making it her goal to tell stories not just with reporting, but through filmmaking. Much of her inspiration came from the experiences she heard from others. Hamdan would compare and connect them to her parents’ experiences with exile and war, influencing her desire to make films. While still working as a journalist, Hamdan began writing her own scripts and she got her first opportunity in 2009 by RAWI Sundance screenwriter’s lab in Jordan. She has since made five or six short films, all self-financed and self-produced. Hamdan stated that even though she didn’t attend film school, films up to this point have been her primary education.

Hamdan stopped being a journalist in 2014. As of 2017, Hamdan is founding editor and manager of the Marie Colvin Journalists' Network (MCJN), a collective of women journalists in the Arab World. As a freelancer, Hamdan has contributed to publications including The New Arab, The Markaz Review and The Badger Herald. She notes how her background in journalism continues to shape her. She prioritizes fact-checking, while developing narrative detail.

=== Filmmaking ===
Hamdan's debut short film Gaza – London, based on a true story of a Palestinian student in London who faces being away from his family during Operation Cast Lead, won Best Arab Film at the 2009 Jordan Short Film Festival. That same year, her project My Name is Ali was selected for the Sundance Institute's RAWI Middle East Screenwriters Lab. This project was about two strangers whose lives intersect in Casablanca and discover they are linked and must delve back into their past demons. In 2010, Hamdan received the Abu Dhabi Film Commission's Shasha grant to develop a project titled The Kidnap, which was selected for the Hothouse workshop at the London Film School. This project was about a Jordanian policeman and how he goes on a hunt to find his kidnapped wife who’s due to give birth, but there’s a dark secret that this search leads him to.

The next short film of Hamdan's to do a festival circuit was The Bomb (Die Bombe), which was a runner-up for the Human Rights Short award at the 2019 Naples Human Rights Film Festival. In an Interview with Shoot N’ Post, Hamdan mentions how this film was shot under difficult circumstances with an incredibly dedicated team. She credits director of photography Frank Schwaiger, and line producer Olivia Stubbe.

Shot on location in the West Bank in 2023, Hamdan gained prominence through her next short film Blood Like Water, which follows a young gay man in the West Bank who faces blackmail from the IDF. Hamdan described the film as "fictional" but "based on real information". Blood Like Water premiered at the Galway Film Fleadh, screened at the 2023 Brooklyn Film Festival, where it was awarded Best Narrative Short, and won the 2024 Iris Prize. In her acceptance speech for the latter, Hamdan condemned Israel's pinkwashing.

Dima Hamdan is developing her debut feature film Amnesia, produced by Tony Copti. Amnesia received an Atlas Development Prize at the 2023 Marrakech International Film Festival.

== Personal life ==
In 2009, Hamdan became a British citizen. She also holds Jordanian citizenship. She relocated to Berlin circa 2016 "to explore a different city".

== Filmography ==
- Gaza – London (2009, short, 15 minutes)
- The Bomb (2019, short, 21 minutes)
- Blood Like Water (2023, short, 13 minutes)
- Amnesia (TBA)

== Awards & Nominations ==
- Brooklyn Film Festival, 2024 Winner, Best Short Narrative, Blood Like Water
- Melbourne International Film Festival, 2024 Nominee, City of Melbourne Award, Best Short Film, Blood Like Water
- Iris Prize Festival, 2024 Winner, Iris Prize, Blood Like Water
- Ayodhya Film Festival, 2019 Winner, Jury Prize, Best Women Director, The Bomb
- Runner-up for the Human Rights Short award, 2019 Naples Human Rights Film Festival, The Bomb
- Jordan Film Festival 2009, Best Arab Short prize winner, Gaza-London
