= Cairo International Women's Film Festival =

- CIWFF's Logo
- Location: Cairo, Egypt
- Founded: 2008
- Awards: Audience Award
- No. of films: 53 films (74 screenings) at the 2017 edition
- Festival date: February/March
- Language: All films are subtitled in Arabic and English
- Website: CIWFF Official Website

The Cairo International Women's Film Festival (Arabic: مهرجان القاهرة الدولي لسينما المرأة) or CIWFF is an independent initiative dedicated to introducing films directed by women from around the world—not necessarily addressing women's issues—to explore the perspectives of female filmmakers.

The founder and directors of the festival emphasize its goal to be serving as a platform through which films created by women are introduced to the audience as well as 'a meeting point for the audience and filmmakers'. To that end, films are screened at no fee with both English and Arabic subtitles and Q&A sessions, panels and master classes are held with guests of the festival.

== History ==
The festival first came to existence in 2008 in the form of Entre Cineastas (Arabic: بين سينمائيات) or the Caravan of Arab and Latin American Women's Films (Arabic: قافلة سينما المرأة العربية واللاتينية). The caravan was held in various Arab, Latin American, and Spanish cities. Over the years, the initiative developed to, eventually, expand into the Cairo International Women's Film Festival, and include the Caravan as one of many sections of the festival.

== Sections, events and activities ==
Throughout the festival, master classes and panels are held to introduce filmmakers to the audience and open the floor for themes or film-based discussions.

One pillar of the festival is the One Minute Workshop (Arabic: ورشة أفلام الدقيقة الواحدة). This is a workshop instructed by filmmaker and founder of CIWFF, Amal Ramsis, where she teaches non-professional women the basics of making short films in order to write, act, shoot and direct one-minute long films addressing a selected concept. It is held several times around the year in various cities and towns around Egypt and the Arab World, Latin America and Europe in collaboration with the TRAMA network and Drac Màgic—the women's film festival that had launched the initiative in 1997.

Sections of the festival change with every edition. One integral section, however, is the Caravan. Every edition also celebrates one prominent female filmmaker by screening a selection of her films in a section titled ′Tribute to a Cineaste′ and inviting her to conduct Q&A sessions and a panel. Other recurring sections are the International Panorama, the Country in Focus and the Guest Festival—which is often a partner women's film festival.

== Award ==
CIWFF features one award: The Audience Award. It was first introduced in the 6th edition (2013). All films qualify except films from the Caravan, the Tribute and the Workshop. Through a public vote, one film is selected to receive the award. No committee has any say in the selection. Should the audience vote for a short film, the award is divided between the first- and the second-ranking films. It is, then, presented to the director of the winning film—if present—and the film is screened on closing night.

Some films that have won the Audience Award are:

Year	Film title	Original Title	Director(s)
2017	Aya Goes to the Beach	آية والبحر	Maryam Touzani
2016	Trip Along Exodus	رحلة في الرحيل	Hend Choufani
2014	Wooden Hand	يد اللوح	Kouther Ben Henia
2014	Profession: Documentarist	Herfeh: Mostanadsaz	Farahnaz Sharifi, Firouzeh Khosrovani, Mina Keshavarz, Nahid Rezaei, Sahar Salahshoor, Sepideh Abtahi, Shirin Barghnavard
2013	Silent City	Silent City	Threes Anna

== See also ==
- List of women's film festivals
