= Amal Ramsis =

Egyptian filmmaker

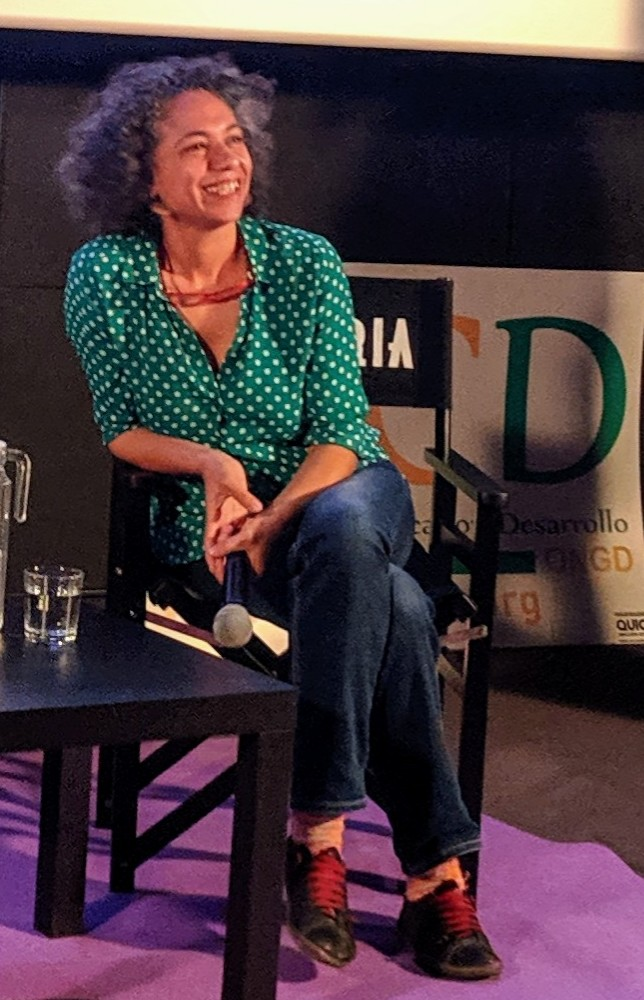
- Born: Alexandria, Egypt
- Occupation: Filmmaker
- Notable work: The Trace of the Butterfly, Forbidden

Amal Ramsis (Arabic: أمل رمسيس) is an Egyptian filmmaker. She studied directing at the International Film and Television School in Madrid.

== Filmography ==
Year	Original title	English title	Credits
2018	You Come From Far Away	You Come From Far Away	Director
2015	أثر الفراشة	The Trace of the Butterfly	Director
2011	ممنوع	Forbidden	Director
2009	Life	Life	Director
2005	Solo Sueños	Only Dreams	Director
2001	بيروت على شط البحر	Beirut Is on the Seaside	Director

She has also directed Silence and Plateau.

=== Prizes ===
Ramsis' Forbidden has been awarded the Audience Award for the Best Feature Documentary in Drac Magic (May 2011), the Best Film in the Arab Film Festival of Rotterdam (September 2011), the Best Film for Human Rights in the Festival Internacional de Cine Invisible de Bilbao (September 2011), the Best Film in the Festival of Political Cinema realized by Women of Madrid (December 2011) and the Best Documentary Film in the Festival Internacional de Cine Pobre (April 2012); it was also screened at the Millennium Film Festival and the Arab Film Festival Berlin. Her The Trace of the Butterfly, an entirely independent film with no external funding, has received the Audience Award in Dortmund | Cologne's International Women's Film Festival and screened at the Istanbul Film Festival, the CINEQUEST Film Festival at California, Her Africa Film Festival and the IAWRT African Film Festival.

== Contributions to film festivals ==
=== Cairo International Women's Film Festival ===
In 2008, she founded Caravan of Arab and Latin American Women's Films (Arabic: قافلة سينما المرأة العربية واللاتينية) or Entre Cineastas (Arabic: بين سينمائيات), which developed later into the Cairo International Women's Film Festival (Arabic: مهرجان القاهرة الدولي لسينما المرأة). It is the first festival of its kind in the Arab World. Ramsis also heads the One-Minute Workshop program where she trains non-professional women in the basics of cinematography and short film directing.

=== Dortmund | Cologne International Women's Film Festival ===
Ramsis served on the Rwe Film Award selection jury in 2015.
