= Roshmia =

Roshmia (film) (Arabic: روشميا) is a feature-length documentary by Salim Abu Jabal. A story of an elderly Palestinian refugee couple in a final standoff with the Israeli authorities to maintain their lifestyle in Roshmia, the last natural valley in Haifa.

== Synopsis ==
Yousef and his wife Amna have lived in a shack all alone in their eighties since 1956 in what seems to be a life of serenity; far away from the loudness of modern life. Life remains peaceful in Roshmia until the Israeli authorities endorse a new road project and order to confiscate their land, demolish the shack and throw them out. A friend of the couple tries to secure a compensation from the municipality but the shack is Yousef's home that he insists on keeping; living in bliss and comfort as ever, however the negotiations continue and tension grows among the three. Furthermore, and besides the physical displacement and despair they are nearly facing, Yousef and Amna are about to go on separate ways.

== Awards ==
- “Oasis d’Or (Golden Oasis)” at Gabes International Arab Film Festival
- “Grand Prize” at Festival International Cinéma Méditerranéen Tétouan
- “Special Jury Prize” at Dubai International Film Festival
- “Best Documentary” (Open Eyes Award) at MedFilm Festival Rome
- “Special Jury Prize” at festival International du Cinéma d'Alger
- Official selection, International Documentary Film Festival Amsterdam 2015
- Official selection, DOXA Documentary Film Festival 2016.
