= Amman Filmmakers Cooperative =

Coordinates: 31°56′59″N 35°55′58″E

- Founder: Hazim Bitar
- Established: 2002
- Location: Amman, Jordan
- Website: http://jordanianfilms.com

The Amman Filmmakers Cooperative (تعاونية عمان للأفلام) (in Arabic) promotes independent Jordanian and Palestinian Diaspora filmmaking through training, experimentation, and networking. The Cooperative seeks to empower student filmmakers to produce films using very nominal resources and with the help of digital filmmaking tools. The Cooperative also manages the Jordan Short Film Festival, an art film festival established in 2004.

== Overview ==
Founded in 2002 by Palestinian diaspora filmmaker Hazim M. Bitar, The Amman Filmmakers Cooperative (AFC) began as a social network of cinema aficionados in Jordan. In 2003, the Cooperative started offering free filmmaking workshops and production support to independent filmmakers.

== Community Initiatives ==
In 2007 the Cooperative and the Spanish Embassy in Jordan worked together to launch Hope Films, a project that organizes workshops for disadvantaged Jordanian communities including Palestinian refugee camps. and the Jordan Short Film Festival
