= Sale Sharks =

Professional rugby union club from Greater Manchester, England

(England) Sale Sharks
- Full name: Sale Sharks Rugby Union Football Club
- Founded: 1861; 165 years ago (as "Sale Football Club"); 1999; 27 years ago (as "Sale Sharks")
- Location: Barton-upon-Irwell, Salford, England
- Ground: CorpAcq Stadium (Capacity: 12,000)
- Chairman: Fran Cotton
- CEO: Paul Smith
- Director of Rugby: Alex Sanderson
- Coach: Joe Ford
- Captain: Ernst van Rhyn
- Most appearances: Mark Cueto (304)
- Top scorer: Charlie Hodgson (1,872)
- Most tries: Mark Cueto (90)
- League: PREM Rugby
- 2025–26: 7th of 10
1st kit	2nd kit

Official website
- salesharks.com

Sale Sharks is a professional rugby union club from Greater Manchester, England, United Kingdom. The team plays in the Gallagher Premiership, and has been in England's top division of rugby union continuously since 1994. Originally founded in 1861 as Sale Football Club (which is now a distinct amateur club), it is one of the oldest existing football clubs. (Note: As a code of football, rugby clubs also referred to itself, or continues to refer to itself, as simply a "football club", or as a "rugby football club". See Football (word).) It adopted the nickname Sharks in 1999.

Since 2012, Sale has played home games at the CorpAcq Stadium (formerly known as Salford Community Stadium) in Barton-upon-Irwell, Salford, which is shared with Salford Red Devils rugby league club. Between 1905 and 2003, Sale played at Heywood Road in Sale, before moving to Edgeley Park in Stockport where Sale stayed until 2012. Historically one of the leading teams in the north of England, the traditional colours are blue and white.

Domestically, Sale was Premiership champions in 2005–06 and runners up in 2001-02 and 2022-23. Sale won the Premiership Rugby Cup in 2019-20 and was losing finalists in its predecessors, the RFU Knockout Cup in 1997 and the Anglo-Welsh Cup, in 2012-13. Sale also won the second division in 1994 to secure promotion to the Premiership. Internationally, the club won the second tier European Rugby Challenge Cup in 2001–02 and 2004–05.

In the 2024–25 Premiership Rugby season, Sale finished third in the regular season, losing in the play-off semi-final. This position entitled the team to compete in the 2024–25 European Rugby Champions Cup. The club's Director of Rugby is Alex Sanderson, who was appointed in January 2021.

== History ==
=== 1861–1990s ===
The club was founded in 1861 and is one of the oldest clubs in English rugby. Throughout its history it has been one of the leading rugby union clubs in the north of England. Sale moved into Heywood Road in 1905 and remained there until 2003.

Sale were unbeaten in 26 matches, winning 24 and drawing two in 1911.

Although Pat Davies is counted as Sale's first international, having been picked to play for England in 1927, it was G.A.M. Isherwood who was Sale's first representative in an international Test match, when he played in all three tests of the 1910 British tour to South Africa at scrum-half. The club has consistently provided international players and, during the 1930s, had one of its most dominant periods, fielding players of the calibre of Hal Sever (England), Claude Davey and Wilf Wooller (Wales) and Ken Fyfe (Scotland). It came as little surprise when they took out the 1936 Middlesex Sevens.

Sale ruled the roost in county cup rugby for 15 straight seasons as the team went unbeaten from 1972 to 1987 in every one of those cup fixtures. During this period, Sale competed for the chance to be English club champions. In the team's first year, one after the inaugural competition kicked off in 1971, it made the semi-finals only to lose to eventual winners Coventry 35–6.

=== Professional era ===
During the 1990s, despite thrilling displays under Paul Turner, and his successor John Mitchell, both club and ground struggled to keep a grip on the demanding commercial and financial realities of running a professional rugby club.

Sale took 20,000 fans to Twickenham for the 1997 Pilkington Cup Final but Leicester won a mistake-ridden match 9–3. This interest quickly faded and the anticipated increased crowds never materialised and relegation from the Premier Division loomed until rugby union-playing local businessman Brian Kennedy came to the rescue late in the 1999–2000 season. Since then, the club has been on a sound financial footing.

Off the field, Peter Deakin was recruited from Warrington Wolves rugby league as chief executive to employ the skills he had used with the Bradford Bulls and Saracens, and he made an immediate impact in raising the club's profile until hit by the serious illness which claimed his life in February 2003.

Success was not immediate; Sale Sharks finished eleventh and tenth in the 12-strong Premiership table in the first two years of the new Millennium. It took the coaching partnership of two former Sale players, Jim Mallinder and Steve Diamond, to produce a team that was the 2002 runners-up and qualified for the Heineken Cup.

Player signings matched the elevated profile of the club. Scotland skipper Bryan Redpath was joined by Stuart Pinkerton, Barry Stewart, Graeme Bond, Jason White and Andrew Sheridan. The club then turned to the wealth of talent, hitherto largely untapped, in rugby league. Apollo Perelini, known as "The Terminator" for his uncompromising style, joined Sale Sharks the day after helping St. Helens to victory in the Super League Grand Final at Old Trafford and the media had a field day when Jason Robinson, possibly the most exciting wing in the world in either code, moved to Sale from Wigan Warriors.

In 2002 the team also went on to capture the European Challenge Cup at Oxford's Kassam Stadium, defeating Pontypridd 25–22.

The latter Mallinder days saw the club at Twickenham again in 2004, losing narrowly to the Falcons in the Powergen Cup Final. In the summer of 2004 Jim Mallinder left Sale to take up a position in the RFU's National Academy. Following Mallinder's departure Sale appointed former French international Philippe Saint-André who had recently been turned down for the vacant position as coach of Wales. However, with a new influx of players including French internationals Sébastien Bruno and Sébastien Chabal helped Saint-André and Sale win the 2005 European Challenge Cup again at Oxford, this time 27–3 against Pau, for the second time in three years.

=== 2005–06 season: Champions ===
New additions to the squad for the 2005–06 season included French prop Lionel Faure, Samoan back Elvis Seveali'i and Welsh number eight Nathan Bonner-Evans. Building on their European Challenge Cup success, Sale won 16 games out of 22 to finish two games clear at the top of the table. In the semi-final against London Wasps, they won 22–12. They won the 2006 Premiership title with a 45–20 win against Leicester Tigers.

=== 2006–2009 ===
After the success of the 2005–06 season many at the club had hoped for a repeat. However an injury crisis struck. More and more injuries were picked up over the following months until Sale were left with only 17 of a 38-man squad fit to play in their final Heineken Cup match against Ospreys.

In 2007–08, it was World Cup year so the club was without some of their big names. Sale appointed James Jennings as the new chief executive and Dean Schofield as the new captain. Sale had signed good players including Luke McAlister from the Blues in New Zealand. The season was up and down. Successes included; beating Leicester Tigers home and away for the first time. However, the low points were not qualifying for the semi-finals in the Premiership or win a trophy.

On 19 August 2008, Juan Martín Fernández Lobbe was announced as the captain for the new season, replacing Jason White who was still recovering from an injury. A new Premiership record of four games without leaking a try was set at the start of the season, these games were Newcastle (A), Saracens (H), Bristol (A) and Gloucester (H). Sale was knocked out of the European Cup in the group stages. Despite earning a win over Clermont, a defeat at home to Munster, a defeat to Montauban and Munster beating The Sharks in Ireland led to an exit. Charlie Hodgson was voted the player of the year at the club's end-of-season awards on Thursday 30 April 2009.

Philippe Saint-André stepped down from his position as Director of Rugby at the end of the 2008–09 season. Along with the departure of Saint-André, a number of key players announced that their time at Sale was up. Captain Juan Martín Fernández Lobbe and cult figure Sébastien Chabal all bade farewell to the club at the end of the season.

=== 2009–2013: Near relegation ===
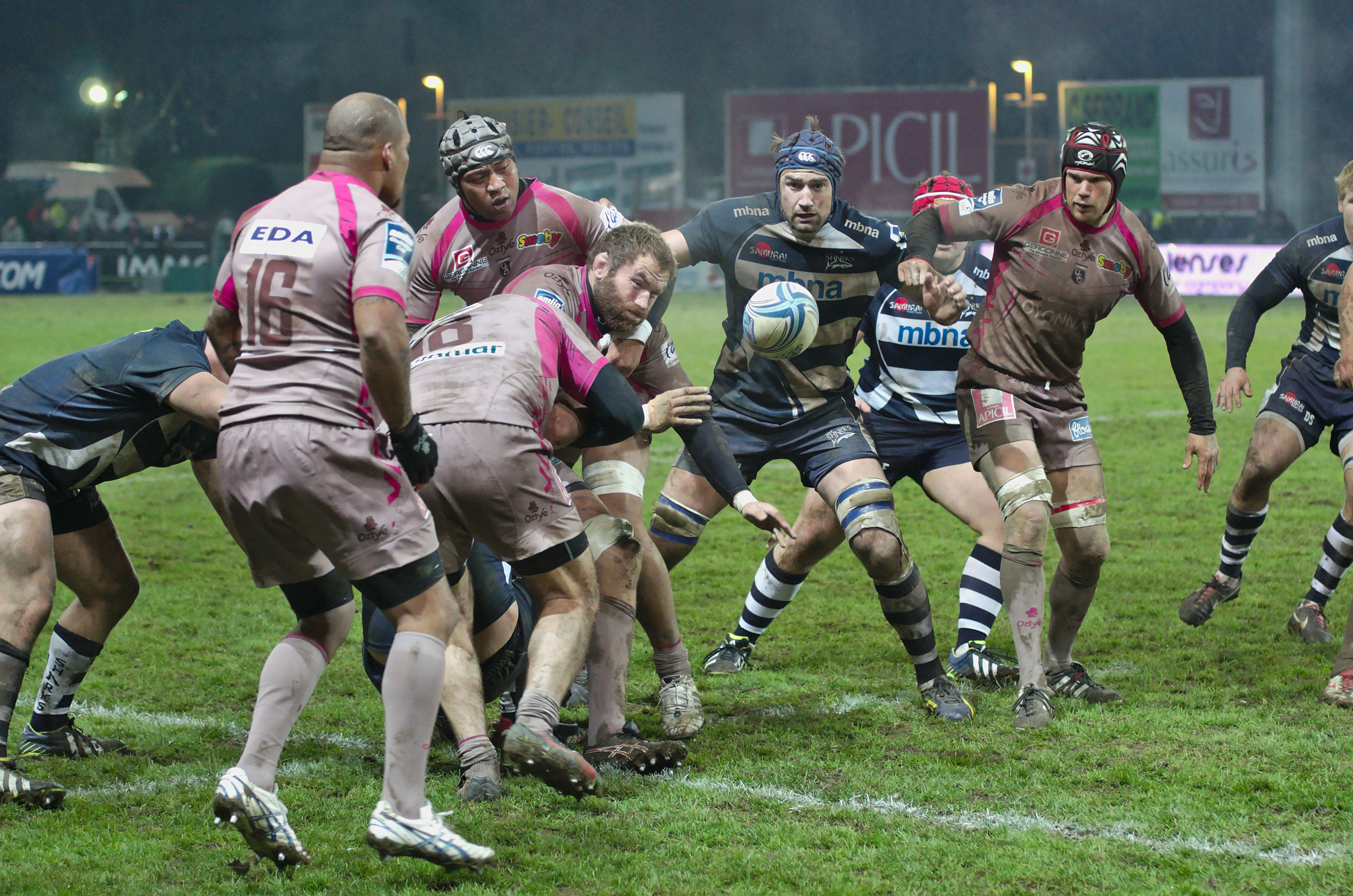
Sale Sharks and Oyonnax at Stade Charles-Mathon, 2013

For the 2009–10 season, Kingsley Jones was promoted from Head Coach to Director of Rugby; former Sale winger Jason Robinson became head coach. Sale had a disappointing 2009–10 season, finishing 11th in the Premiership and only securing safety from relegation on the penultimate weekend of the season. Sale's Heineken Cup campaign also ended in disappointment. The highlights of the campaign were a 27–26 win at home to Cardiff and wins home and away against Harlequins.

There were changes made in the coaching staff. Keith-Roach stepped down from his duties after deciding he could not commit to a full-time role. Robinson, who originally had no intentions to coach but responded to the club's request for help, left the club. Former All Black forward Mike Brewer replaced Robinson as head coach, while Jones remained as Director of Rugby. In December 2010, after only eight months in the role, Brewer was sacked as head coach. Academy coach Pete Anglesea took over as first team coach on a temporary basis until the end of the season, leading Sale to a 10th-placed finish.

In the 2011–12 pre-season, former player Steve Diamond was announced as chairman. Immediately, an overhaul of the playing and coaching staff began, dubbed "Diamond's Revolution". Sale started the season well, but form faltered towards the latter half of the campaign, and Tony Hanks was fired as head coach after a defeat to Saracens. At the close of the season, Sale beat Gloucester and Bath to sixth place in the Premiership, meaning that the team qualified for Heineken Cup in the 2012–13 season.

During the summer of 2012, Sale moved from Edgeley Park, its home since 2003, to the newly constructed Salford City Stadium (which was known as the AJ Bell Stadium for a period of 9 years but now the Salford Community Stadium), to share with the Salford City Reds. Bryan Redpath was confirmed as the director of rugby ahead of the 2012–13 season, however after the club's worst ever start to a season losing the first seven league games, Redpath was removed as DOR. John Mitchell was briefly in charge for a month

=== 2012–2020: Steve Diamond era ===
Sale had a disappointing 2012–13 season at their new stadium, spending most of the season in the relegation place before finishing 10th overall. Mark Cueto over took former Sale teammate Steve Hanley, as top try scorer in the premiership, with his 76th try. Their first win of the season was against Cardiff Blues in the Heineken Cup, which was their only win in that year's Heineken Cup, where they finished bottom of their pool. In the LV Cup in the knock-out stages, they beat Saracens in the semi-final, but lost in the final to Harlequins 14–31.

The 2013–14 season showed a huge improvement from the season before. Sale finished the season in sixth place, missing out on a place on the play-off competition, but managed to secure qualification to the inaugural European Rugby Champions Cup. They also managed to reach the quarter-finals of the European Challenge Cup, where they lost to Northampton Saints. Sale's successes in the season prompted England national team head coach Stuart Lancaster to call up six Sale players in to the squad to play in the summer tour.

For the 2014–15 season, the Sharks finished in seventh in the Aviva Premiership, while they finished bottom of their pool in the European Rugby Champions Cup, having pushed Munster, Saracens & Clermont Auvergne all the way at the AJ Bell Stadium. The standout players for this campaign were academy prospects Mike Haley and Josh Beaumont who became first team regulars, and Josh was called up for the England squad for the England XV which played the Barbarians in May, and scored a try.

From the 2015–16 to the 2019–2020 seasons Sale were regular mid-table finishers. With fifth being their highest finish and tenth their lowest in this period.

The club was taken over in June 2016 by an investment group led by Simon Orange.

2016/17
Notable signings: Rob Webber, AJ MacGinty, Mike Phillips and Byron McGuigan.
Finished 10th in the premiership.
Notable leavers: Mike Phillips, Sam Tuitupou, Peter Stringer and Eifion Lewis-Roberts.

2017/18
Notable signings: Faf de Klerk, Jono Ross, James O'Connor, Marland Yarde and the return of Will Cliff.
Finished 8th in the premiership.
Notable leavers: Mike Haley, Will Addison and David Seymour.

2018/19
Notable signings: Chris Ashton and Rohan Janse van Rensburg.
Finished 7th in the premiership.
Notable leavers: Johnny Leota and James O'Connor.

2019/20
Notable signings: South Africans Rob du Preez, Jean-Luc du Preez, Dan du Preez, Lood de Jager, Akker van der Merwe and Coenie Oosthuizen.
Finished 5th in the premiership.
Notable leavers: Chris Ashton, Rob Webber and Bryn Evans.

2020/21
Notable signings: Manu Tuilagi.

In December 2020, Steve Diamond left the club due to family matters. He left three matches into the 2020–21 Premiership season with the team having won two of those games. Commenting on his time with Sale, Diamond said: “I built with Simon (Orange) and Ged (Mason) a fantastic management team, a great club, really solid foundations and I thought if there was a time for me to step aside and let the other people come through that was the best time."

=== 2021–Present: The Alex Sanderson era ===
In January 2021, Sale confirmed that Saracens forward coach Alex Sanderson took over the role of Director of Rugby at the club. The 41-year-old started his senior playing career at Sale Sharks in 1998, after playing junior rugby at local club Littleborough. He went on to make 90 appearances for the club, with his leadership qualities earning him the club captaincy. Alex was quoted saying "I'm joining a club I know all about from my time here, but things have moved on massively since those days and the opportunity to come back home and achieve something special was just too good to turn down,". Sanderson would extend his contract with the club in 2024, resulting in him remaining as director of rugby until the end of the 2026/27 season.

The Sharks finished 3rd in the Gallagher Premiership. A semi-final tie away at Exeter Chiefs resulted in a 40 – 30 loss. In the Heineken Champions Cup after finishing Pool an 8th with one point, Sale went on to beat Scarlets away 57 – 14 in the round of 16 setting up a last-eight away tie at La Rochelle resulting in a 45 – 21 defeat. That season saw academy prospects Sam Dugdale, Bevan Rodd, Arron Reed and Raffi Quirke all become first-team regulars.

2021/22
Notable signings: Nick Schonert and the return of Tommy Taylor and Simon McIntyre.
The team struggled in the first half of the season, which was Sanderson's first full season in charge. Results picked up in the new year but Sale narrowly missed out on the top 4 by 5 points, having to settle for a 6th-place finish.
For the second season in a row they were defeated by French opposition in the Champions Cup quarter final losing 41–22 to Racing Metro despite leading 10–6 at halftime.
Notable leavers: Faf De Klerk, Lood de Jager, Rohan Janse Van Rensburg, AJ Macginty, Cameron Neild and Curtis Langdon.

2022/23
Notable signings: George Ford, Jonny Hill and Tom O'Flaherty.
The season started with five consecutive league wins and the good form continued, with Sale remaining in 2nd position for the remainder of the season.
The club would then beat Leicester in their first home playoff semi-final since 2006.
In the final Sale were leading 25–23 with 15 minutes remaining, but conceded two late tries resulting in Saracens winning 35–25.
Notable leavers: Will Cliff, Jono Ross, Byron McGuigan, Akker van der Merwe, Coenie Oosthuizen and Ewan Ashman.

2023/24
Notable signings: Luke Cowan-Dickie, Agustín Creevy, Ernst van Rhyn and Sam Bedlow.
After 1/3rd of the league season Sale topped the table with 5 wins and 1 loss, although a mid-season drop in form would result in Sale having to win all their remaining matches following the 6 Nations break to stay in playoff contention. Sale would beat Saracens 20–10 on the final day of the regular season to finish in third place.

Sale would then play Bath in the play-offs, losing 31–23.

Notable leavers: Sam James, Manu Tuilagi, Agustin Creevy, Cobus Wiese

2024/25
Notable signings: Waisea Nayacalevu In December 2024, having not picked up a point away from home all season Sale defeated joint-league leaders on points, Bristol Bears, 0–38 at Ashton Gate. This was the first time since September 2016 that Bristol had not scored in a point in a Premiership fixture.

== Kits ==
Kit suppliers and shirt sponsors
Period	Kit manufacturer	Shirt sponsor (chest)
1998 - 1999	Cotton Traders	First Software
1999 - 2000	Cotton Traders	Cotton Traders
2000 - 2006	Cotton Traders	AMD
2006 - 2009	Cotton Traders	McAfee
2009 - 2011	Cotton Traders	UKFast
2011 - 2012	Cotton Traders	mbna
2012 - 2013	Canterbury	mbna
2013 - 2016	Samurai	mbna
2016 - 2019	Samurai	UKFast
2019 - 2021	Samurai	VCode
2021–2024	Macron	AO
2024–Present	Macron	Toshiba

=== Current kit ===
From the 2021/22 season onwards the kit is supplied by Macron, with the Italian technical sportswear firm producing match day and training kit, leisurewear and accessories for the men's, women's and academy sides for the following six years. Macron also became the club's official retail partner.

== Season summaries ==
	Premiership				Domestic Cup		European Cup	
Season	Competition	Final Position	Points	Play-offs	Competition	Performance	Competition	Performance
1987–88	Courage League Division 1	12th (R)	11	N/A	John Player Cup	Quarter-final	No competition	N/A
1988–89	Courage League Division 2	4th	12	N/A	Pilkington Cup	2nd round	No competition	N/A
1989–90	Courage League Division 2	9th	8	N/A	Pilkington Cup	4th round	No competition	N/A
1990–91	Courage League Division 2	7th	11	N/A	Pilkington Cup	3rd round	No competition	N/A
1991–92	Courage League Division 2	8th	10	N/A	Pilkington Cup	4th round	No competition	N/A
1992–93	Courage League Division 2	5th	15	N/A	Pilkington Cup	3rd round	No competition	N/A
1993–94	Courage League Division 2	1st (P)	28	N/A	Pilkington Cup	Quarter-final	No competition	N/A
1994–95	Courage League Division 1	4th	16	N/A	Pilkington Cup	Quarter-final	No competition	N/A
1995–96	Courage League Division 1	5th	19	N/A	Pilkington Cup	4th round	No English teams	N/A
1996–97	Courage League Division 1	5th	28	N/A	Pilkington Cup	Runners-up	Challenge Cup	3rd in pool
1997–98	Premiership	7th	22	N/A	Tetley's Bitter Cup	Semi-final	Challenge Cup	3rd in pool
1997–98	Premiership	7th	22	N/A	C&G Cup	Semi-final	Challenge Cup	3rd in pool
1998–99	Premiership	11th	19	N/A	Tetley's Bitter Cup	4th round	No English teams	N/A
1998–99	Premiership	11th	19	N/A	C&G Cup	Semi-final	No English teams	N/A
1999–00	Premiership	11th	18	N/A	Tetley's Bitter Cup	5th round	Challenge Cup	3rd in pool
2000–01	Premiership	10th	43	N/A	Tetley's Bitter Cup	Semi-final	Challenge Cup	2nd in pool
2001–02	Premiership	2nd	69	N/A	Powergen Cup	6th round	Challenge Cup	Champions
2002–03	Premiership	4th	62	–	Powergen Cup	6th round	Heineken Cup	4th in pool
2003–04	Premiership	7th	53	–	Powergen Cup	Runners-up	Heineken Cup	4th in pool
2004–05	Premiership	3rd	60	Semi-final	Powergen Cup	Quarter-final	Challenge Cup	Champions
2005–06	Premiership	1st	74	Champions	Powergen Cup	3rd in pool	Heineken Cup	Quarter-final
2006–07	Premiership	10th	42	–	EDF Energy Cup	Semi-final	Heineken Cup	3rd in pool
2007–08	Premiership	5th	63	–	EDF Energy Cup	4th in pool	Challenge Cup	Semi-final
2008–09	Premiership	5th	61	–	EDF Energy Cup	4th in pool	Heineken Cup	2nd in pool
2009–10	Premiership	11th	32	–	LV= Cup	3rd in pool	Heineken Cup	3rd in pool
2010–11	Premiership	10th	32	–	LV= Cup	4th in pool	Challenge Cup	2nd in pool
2011–12	Premiership	6th	49	–	LV= Cup	4th in pool	Challenge Cup	2nd in pool
2012–13	Premiership	10th	35	–	LV= Cup	Runners-up	Heineken Cup	4th in pool
2013–14	Premiership	6th	57	–	LV= Cup	2nd in pool	Challenge Cup	Quarter-final
2014–15	Premiership	7th	54	–	LV= Cup	3rd in pool	Champions Cup	4th in pool
2015–16	Premiership	6th	58	–	No competition	N/A	Challenge Cup	Quarter-final
2016–17	Premiership	10th	40	–	Anglo-Welsh Cup	3rd in pool	Champions Cup	4th in pool
2017–18	Premiership	8th	54	–	Anglo-Welsh Cup	3rd in pool	Challenge Cup	3rd in pool
2018–19	Premiership	7th	55	–	Premiership Cup	3rd in pool	Challenge Cup	Semi-final
2019–20	Premiership	5th	64	–	Premiership Cup	Champions	Champions Cup	4th in pool
2020–21	Premiership	3rd	74	Semi-final	No competition	N/A	Champions Cup	Quarter-final
2021–22	Premiership	6th	70	–	Premiership Cup	4th in pool	Champions Cup	Quarter-final
2022-23	Premiership	2nd	69	Finalist	Premiership Cup	Semi-final	Challenge Cup*	Round of 16*
2023-24	Premiership	3rd	56	Semi-final	Premiership Cup	3rd in pool	Challenge Cup*	Round of 16*
2024-25	Premiership	3rd	58	Semi-final	Premiership Cup	Quarter-final	Champions Cup	Round of 16

- * dropping into the competition from the European Rugby Champions Cup

Gold background denotes champions
Silver background denotes runners-up
Pink background denotes relegated

== Club honours ==
=== Sale Sharks ===
- Premiership Rugby
  - Champions (1): 2005–06
- RFU Championship
  - Champions (1): 1993–94
- European Challenge Cup
  - Champions (2): 2001–02, 2004–05
- Premiership Rugby Cup
  - Champions (1): 2019–20
- Cheshire RFU Cup (tiers 4–5)
  - Champions (17): 1969–70, 1972–73, 1973–74, 1974–75, 1975–76, 1976–77, 1977–78, 1978–79, 1979–80, 1980–81, 1981–82, 1982–83, 1983–84, 1984–85, 1985–86, 1986–87, 1996–97

=== Sale Jets (Reserves) ===
- Cheshire RFU Cup
  - Champions (2): 2009–10, 2010–11 (shared)

=== Sevens ===
- Middlesex Sevens
  - Champions (1): 1936
- Glengarth Sevens Main Event
  - Champions (1): 1977
- Glengarth Sevens Davenport Plate
  - Champions (2): 1968, 1985
- Melrose Sevens
  - Champions (1): 2003
- Glasgow City Sevens
  - Champions (2): 2007, 2009

== Current squad ==
The Sale Sharks squad for the 2026–27 season is:

Sale Sharks 2026–27 Premiership Rugby squad
**Props**: (Ireland) Patreece Bell; (South Africa) Cebo Dlamini; (Wales) **Tomas Francis**; (England) Simon McIntyre; (England) **Asher Opoku-Fordjour** (Note: Asher Opoku-Fordjour is jointly contracted with the RFU, via an enhanced England Elite Player Squad (EPS) contract.); (England) **Bevan Rodd**; (Wales) **Nicky Smith**; **Hookers**: (England) Ethan Caine; (England) **Luke Cowan-Dickie** (Note: Luke Cowan-Dickie is jointly contracted with the RFU, via an enhanced England Elite Player Squad (EPS) contract.); (England) Nathan Jibulu; **Locks**: (England) Ben Bamber; (South Africa) Ernst van Rhyn; (South Africa) JJ Scheepers; (Wales) **Christ Tshiunza**	**Back row**: (Fiji) **Elia Canakaivata**; (England) **Ben Curry**; (England) **Tom Curry** (Note: Tom Curry is jointly contracted with the RFU, via an enhanced England Elite Player Squad (EPS) contract.); (England) Sam Dugdale; (England) **Courtney Lawes**; (South Africa) Jacques Vermeulen; (England) Tristan Woodman; **Scrum-halves**: (New Zealand) Xavier Roe; (Scotland) **Gus Warr**; **Fly-halves**: (England) **George Ford** (Note: George Ford is jointly contracted with the RFU, via an enhanced England Elite Player Squad (EPS) contract.)	**Centres**: (South Africa) Marius Louw **(c)**; (England) **Alex Lozowski**; (England) Rekeiti Ma'asi-White; (England) **Joe Marchant**; **Wings**: (Fiji) **Ponepati Loganimasi**; (England) Tom O'Flaherty; (England) David Opoku-Fordjour; (England) **Tom Roebuck**; (England) Alex Wills; **Fullbacks**: (England) Joe Carpenter; (England) Luke James; (Scotland) **Arron Reed**
**(c)** denotes the team captain. **Bold** denotes internationally capped players. Source:

=== Academy squad ===
Sale Sharks 2026–27 Senior Academy squad
**Props**: (England) Ralph McEachran; (England) Lawrence Ogbonnaya; (England) Oliver Spencer; (England) Tye Raymont; **Hookers**: (England) Alfie Longstaff; **Locks**: (England) Tom Burrow; (England) Dylan Hodkinson; (England) Patrick Hogg	**Back row**: (England) Charlie Bray; (England) Jos Gilmore; (England) Jordan Ikeh; (England) Seb Kelly; (Scotland) Reuben Logan; **Scrum-halves**: (England) Will Bayston; (England) Dom Hanson; **Fly-halves**: (England) Ollie Davies	**Centres**: (Wales) Osian Roberts; (England) Toby Wilson; **Wingers**: (England) Sebi Krippner; **Fullbacks**: (England) Austin Keogh
**Bold** denotes internationally capped players. Italics denotes U20 international.

== Notable former players ==
=== Lions Tourists ===
The following Sale players have been selected for the Lions tours while at the club:

- G.A.M. Isherwood (1910 Tour to South Africa)
- William Michael Patterson (1959)
- Peter Stagg (1968)
- Fran Cotton (1977 & 1980)
- Steve Smith (1980 & 1983)
- Jason Robinson (2001 & 2005)
- Andy Titterrell (2005)
- Charlie Hodgson (2005)
- Mark Cueto (2005)
- Jason White (2005)
- Andrew Sheridan (2005 & 2009)
- Tom Curry (2021 & 2025)
- Luke Cowan-Dickie (2025)

=== Rugby World Cup ===
The following are players which have represented their countries at the Rugby World Cup whilst playing for Sale Sharks:

Tournament	Players selected	England players	Other international team players
1999	1	Phil Greening	
2003	2	Jason Robinson	Bryan Redpath (c) (Scotland)
2007	10	Andrew Sheridan, Mark Cueto	Elvis Seveali'i (Samoa) , Scott Lawson, Rory Lamont, Jason White (c) (Scotland) , Ignacio Fernández Lobbe, Juan Martín Fernández Lobbe (Argentina) , Sébastien Bruno, Sébastien Chabal (France)
2011	9	Mark Cueto	Alasdair Dickinson, Richie Vernon (Scotland) , Tony Buckley (Ireland) , Andrei Ostrikov (Russia) , Wame Lewaravu (Fiji) , Tasesa Lavea, Johnny Leota (Samoa) , Andy Powell (Wales)
2015	4		TJ Ioane, Johnny Leota (Samoa) , Shalva Mamukashvili (Georgia (country)) , Phil Mackenzie (Canada)
2019	5	Tom Curry, Mark Wilson	Valery Morozov (Russia) , Faf de Klerk (South Africa) , AJ MacGinty (United States)
2023	5	Tom Curry, George Ford, Bevan Rodd, Manu Tuilagi	Augustin Creevy (Argentina)

== Sponsorship ==
Sale Sharks signed a three-year deal with Manchester business UKFast in 1999, the value of the deal being in excess of £2 million, at the same time they changed their name from Sale to Sale Sharks. Lawrence Jones Managing Director of UKFast is a keen supporter of the club.

In 2003, Global computer security software company McAfee were announced as a sponsor, originally the firm's logo was seen on Sale shirt collars a first in terms of sports sponsorship for the company. In April 2006 the company announced a three-year, seven-figure extension to its existing main club sponsorship at a time when Sale was leading the premiership with McAfee principal front of shirt sponsor.

UKFast, announced a new sponsorship deal in March 2009 which ended McAfee's four-year association with the club. UKFast has been associated with the Sharks since 1999 but for the first time had the job of being the principal sponsor. CEO Lawrence Jones decided to end the deal with Sale in April 2011, explaining that the decision was taken partly for business reasons, but also due to changes at the club – including Charlie Hodgson's departure at the end of the 2010–11 season.

In July 2011, the club announced that credit card lender MBNA would become the club's Principal Partner for the next three seasons, and that the partnership would see the MBNA logo on the front of all three of Sales Sharks' home, away and European shirts. A two-year partnership extension was agreed in September 2013 lasting until the end of the 2015/16 season.

After a five-year break UKFast became club sponsors again in July 2016, at the time this was the largest sponsorship deal in the history of the club. CEO Lawrence Jones commented: “This partnership is more than a logo on a shirt. UKFast has been associated with Sale Sharks for more than a decade. It's a club that is incredibly close to my heart and I can't wait to contribute to its success.

In October 2020, Manchester-based cyber technology company VST Enterprises announced it has launched what it claims is the world's first interactive sports kit for the club. The men's team wore a ‘maze’ style logo – called a VCode, positioned between the name branding on the front of their shirts for the 2020/21 season. The Vcode, similar to a QR code, could be scanned by fans via smartphone, allowing access to exclusive content.

On 1 September 2021 Sale Sharks signed up to a new long-term partnership with online electricals store, AO, which seen the Bolton-based retailer take over as the club's principal front of shirt sponsor. AO also worked closely with the Sharks Community Trust, the club's charitable arm, to create and launch ‘Are you AO-K?’, a life-changing mental health programme in schools across the North West. The South Stand at Sharks’ AJ Bell Stadium was also renamed and branded as the AO Stand, as part of the multi-year deal. Sharks CEO at the time Sid Sutton said: “Everyone at the club is so excited to welcome AO to the Sharks family. I have no doubt that this is a partnership that's going to drive the club onto the next level both on and off the pitch".

In August 2024, air conditioning company Carrier Solutions UK became the Principal Partner of the club, with their Toshiba brand becoming the front of shirt sponsor for four years.

== Records ==
=== Team records ===
- Record Win: 76 – 0 vs Bristol (Allied Dunbar Premiership, 1997-98)
- Record Loss: 77 – 7 vs Stade Toulousain (Investec Champions Cup, 2025-2026)
- Best League Position: 1st (Guinness Premiership, 2005-06)
- Worst League Position: 9th (Courage League National Division Two, 1989–90)

=== Player records ===
- Most Premiership Appearances: Mark Cueto – 219
- Top Premiership Try Scorer: Mark Cueto – 90
- Top Premiership Points Scorer: Charlie Hodgson – 1,872
