= Joseph M. Ford =

American politician (1912–1954)

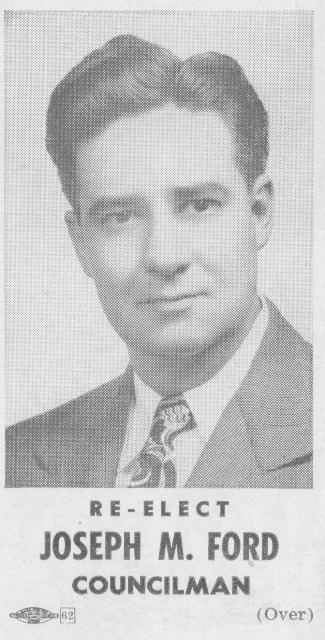

Dearborn City Council member
- In office January 1, 1945 – January 1, 1953

Personal details
- Born: Joseph M. Ford; April 6, 1912 Sault Ste. Marie, Michigan
- Died: September 12, 1954 (aged 42) Dearborn, Michigan
- Party: Republican
- Spouse: Helene Ford
- Children: Bruce; Karen
- Education: University of Detroit
- Profession: Real estate agent

Joseph M. Ford (April 6, 1912 – September 12, 1954) was a member of the Dearborn, MI City Council from 1945-1953. Ford was a resident of Dearborn for 27 years, studied in Dearborn schools and did post graduate work at the University of Detroit. He was a State Senate nominee for the state of Michigan in 1944, 1948, and 1950 under the Republican ticket. Ford was a member of the Pioneers, Knights of Columbus, Moose and Eagles.

== Early life, education, and family ==
Ford was born in Sault Ste. Marie, Michigan on April 6, 1912. Joseph moved to Dearborn in 1923 with his parents. He studied at the University of Detroit. Joseph enjoyed spending time with his family and friends. He was known to be an avid fisherman and an outdoors-man. Joseph spent many weekends at Garling's lodge in Mio, MI fishing with friends and family. Joseph was also a member of the Dearborn Country Club where he spent a fair amount of time golfing with friends.

== Career in Business ==
Joseph operated a real estate brokerage in Dearborn and handled public relations for Dearborn Machinery Movers Co.

== Political career ==
Joseph served as a Dearborn City Council member from 1945-1953. He was a quiet fellow who only spoke when he had something to say. Joseph was in Mayor Hubbard's corner on most issues but it was due to his own beliefs rather than to any political pressure. Joseph was acting Mayor of Dearborn on many occasion throughout his careers and one notable act as acting Mayor of Dearborn, was his Seal 'Day' Proclamation. Joseph on Tuesday November 19, 1946, issued a proclamation officially designating Sunday, November 24, as Christmas Seal Sunday and urged all residents of Dearborn to support the Tuberculosis and Health Society of Wayne County by buying and using the double-barred cross Christmas Seals during the holiday season.

Joseph M. Ford was known for being part of a group known around Dearborn as the BIG FOUR (Councilman Joseph M. Ford, Councilman Martin C.Griffith, Councilman George W. Bondie and Councilwoman Marguerite C. Johnson) which helped shape Dearborn into one of the best cities in the country to live in at the time. He worked with Mayor Orville L. Hubbard on many projects. Joseph was a major part of the development of Dearborn's city parks and fought to acquire all of Dearborn's recreational sites. He is the original sponsor of Camp Dearborn initiative and a major part (championing and fighting for two years) of its acquisition and development.

=== Political Accomplishments ===
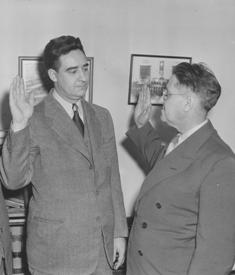
Joseph M. Ford Taking Oath 1945

Joseph M. Ford sponsored, supported and fought to get the following Dearborn initiatives passed:

1. Camp Dearborn (original sponsor and fought for two years to get this initiative passed)
2. Dearborn Civic and Recreation Center
3. Condemnation and development of Public Parking areas
4. Condemnation of property at Cherry Hill and Outer Drive for Fire Station Site
5. Dearborn Historical Museum
6. Public Comfort Station (basement of museum)
7. Free swimming at Seashare Pool
8. Relief sewers in Dearborn Hills
9. Lower tax
10. Development and improvement of Dearborn's Beautiful Parks and Playgrounds (Crowley, York, Penn-Vassar, Levagood, Oak Park, etc...)
11. Legislation that kept Dearborn clean from graft, vice, and corruption
12. Smoke Abatement Ordinance
13. New Building Code
14. 92 miles of paving and resurfacing Dearborn highways

=== Michigan State Senate Republican Nomination ===
Joseph was a Republican candidate for Michigan State Senate 21st District, 1944, 1948, 1950. At age 34 Joseph was one of the youngest candidates ever nominated for State Senator from the 21st District in 1944.

==== Joseph M. Ford (Michigan Senate Election Results) ====
1944 Nov 7: Stanley Nowak (Dem), elected; Joseph M. Ford (Rep), defeated; M. G. McCrary (Socialist), defeated; William F. Bookser (Prohibition), defeated; Ona A. Condit (America First), defeated.

1948 Sep 14 (Primary): Joseph M. Ford (Rep), nominated; Glen W. Ford (Rep), defeated in primary; Walter E. Gibson (Rep), defeated in primary; Richard J. Lehman (Rep), defeated in primary; Thomas J. Brown (Rep), defeated in primary; Thomas M. Lane (Rep), defeated in primary; Hugo F. Volz (Rep), defeated in primary; Julian F. Russell (Rep), defeated in primary.

1948 Nov 2: Robert A. Haggerty (Dem), elected; Joseph M. Ford (Rep), defeated; Percy Llewellyn (Progressive), defeated; Estelle A. Tripp (Prohibition), defeated; Forest Odell (Socialist), defeated.

1950 Sep 12 (Primary): Joseph M. Ford (Rep), nominated; Thomas O. Quinlan (Rep), defeated in primary.

1950 Nov 7: Robert A. Haggerty (Dem), elected; Joseph M. Ford (Rep), defeated; Bruno Maze (Progressive), defeated; Estelle A. Tripp (Prohibition), defeated.

== Public Service Groups and Fraternal Orders ==
- Dearborn Pioneers Club; Bishop Foley Council
- Knights of Columbus (4th Degree)
- Fraternal Order of Eagles (F.O.E.); Dearborn Lodge 1620
- Loyal Order of Moose; Legion of the Moose

== Unexpected Death (September 1954) ==
Prior to his death Joseph had suffered a mild heart attack in 1953 and retired from politics under his physicians advice. Joseph M. Ford was stricken just before midnight Saturday (September 11, 1954) as he was playing cards at the home of friends in Palmer Woods (Detroit, MI). He was rushed to the Mt. Carmel Mercy hospital, where he died at 1:30 A.M. Sunday (September 12, 1954). Joseph was beloved by the Dearborn community as thousands turned out to pay their respects.

== Gallery ==
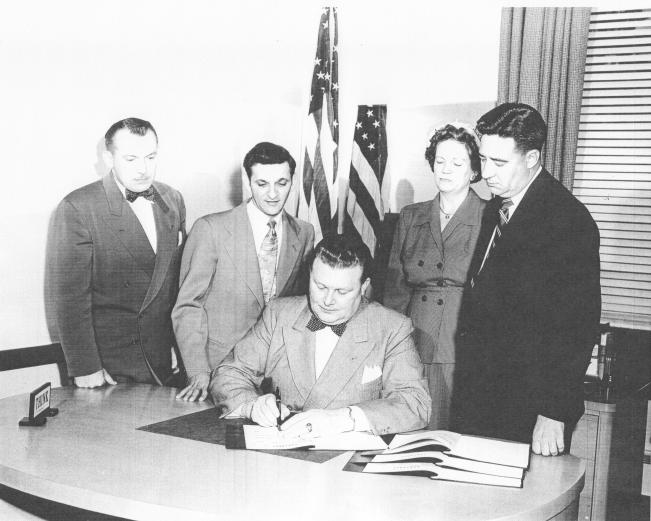
Joseph M. Ford (Far Right)

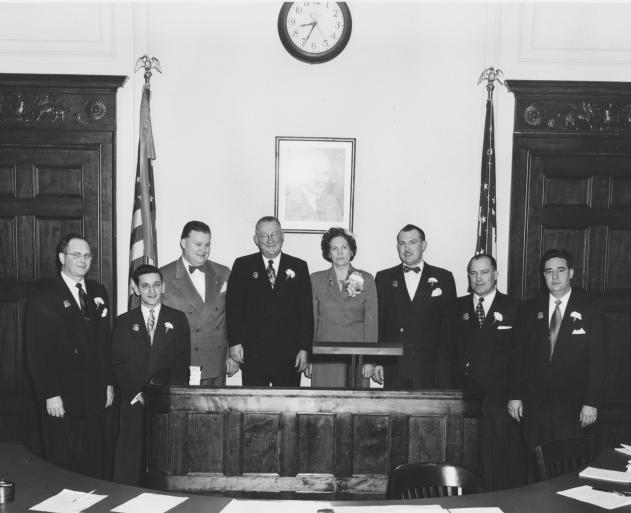
Joseph at City Council Meeting (Far Right)

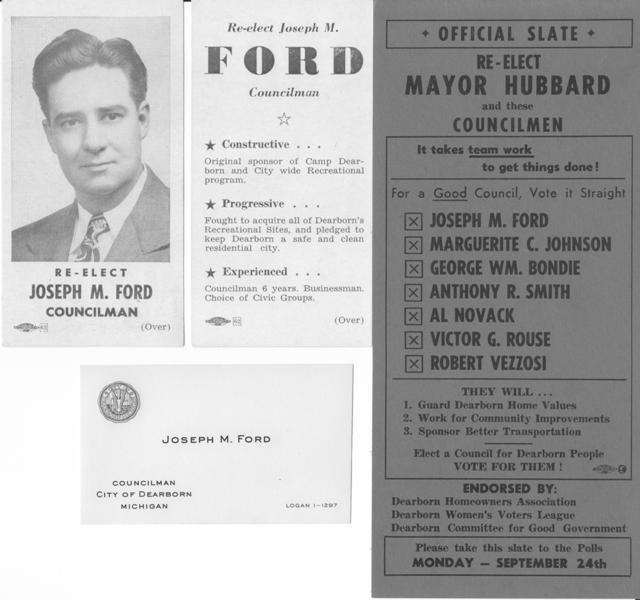
Joseph M. Ford Campaign Memorabilia

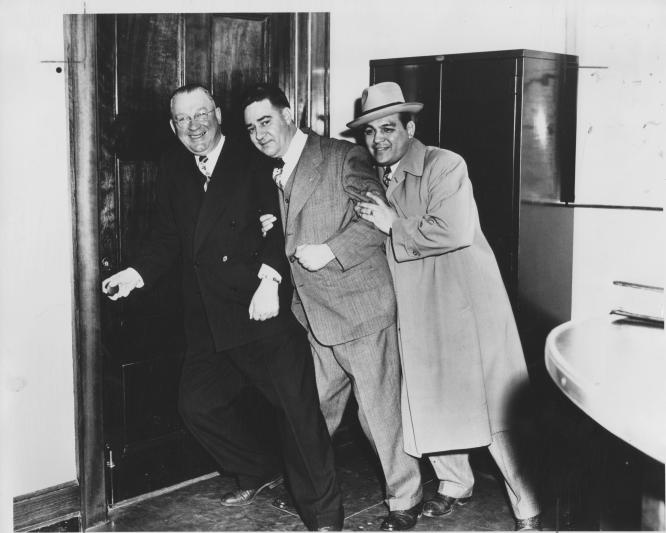
Joseph M. Ford (Middle) Fooling Around at City Hall

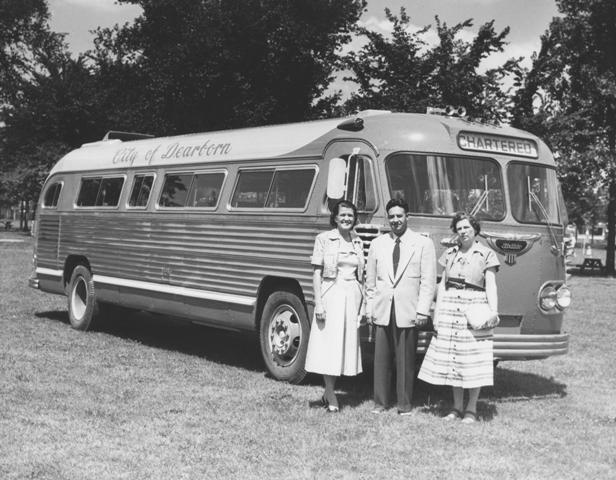
Joseph M. Ford (Middle)

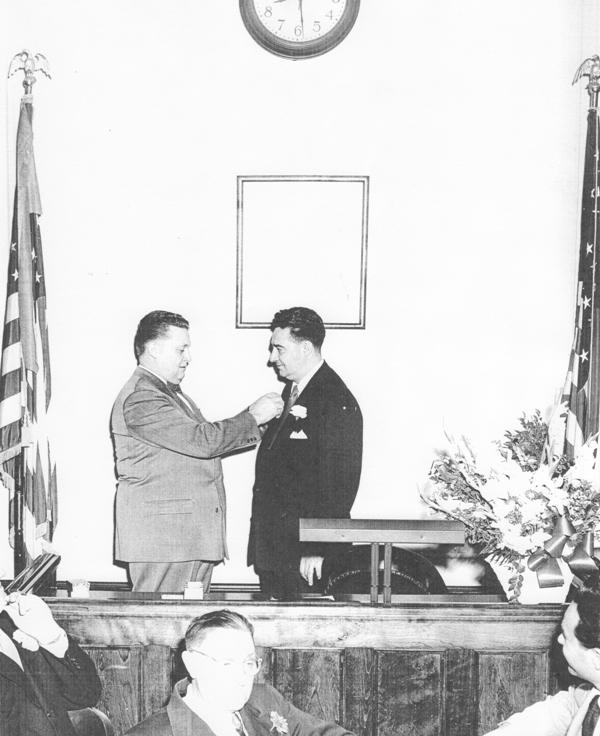
Joseph M. Ford Being Pinned by Mayor Hubbard

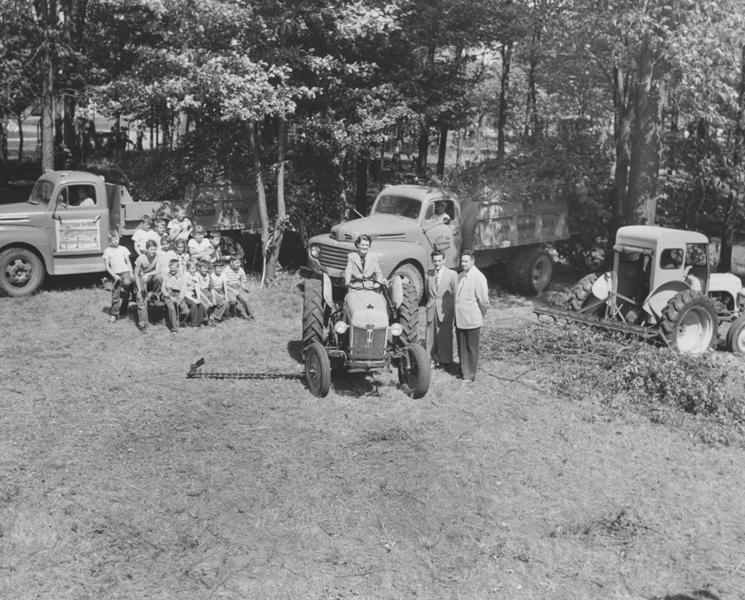
Joseph M. Ford (Far Right)

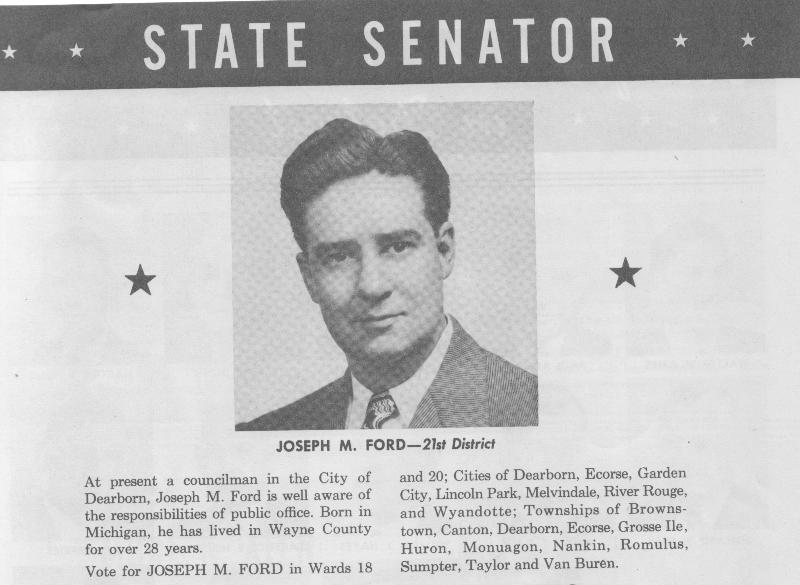
Joseph M. Ford 1950 Michigan State Senate Campaign Ad

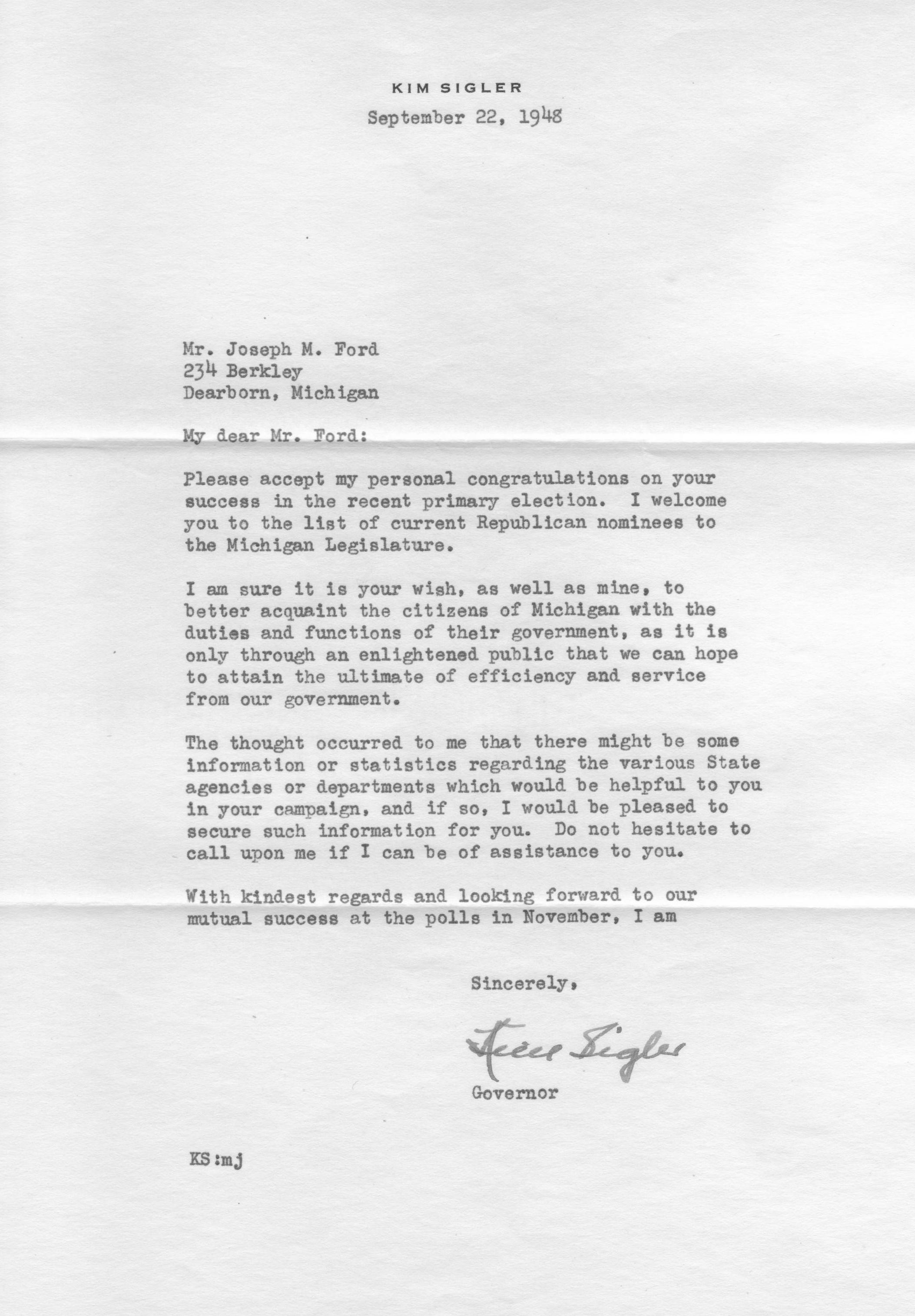
Congratulations Letter from Governor Sigle

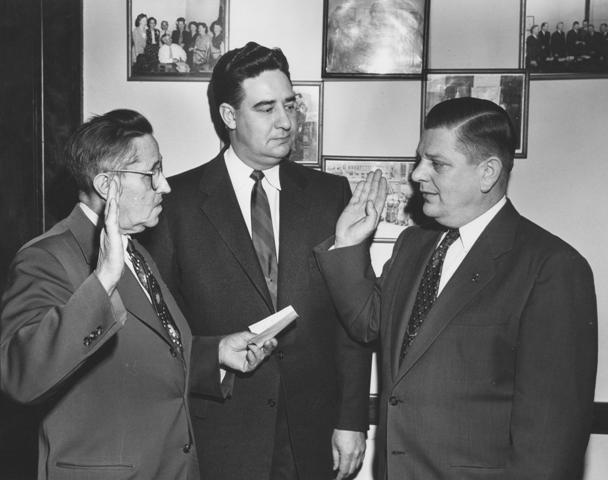
Joseph (Middle)

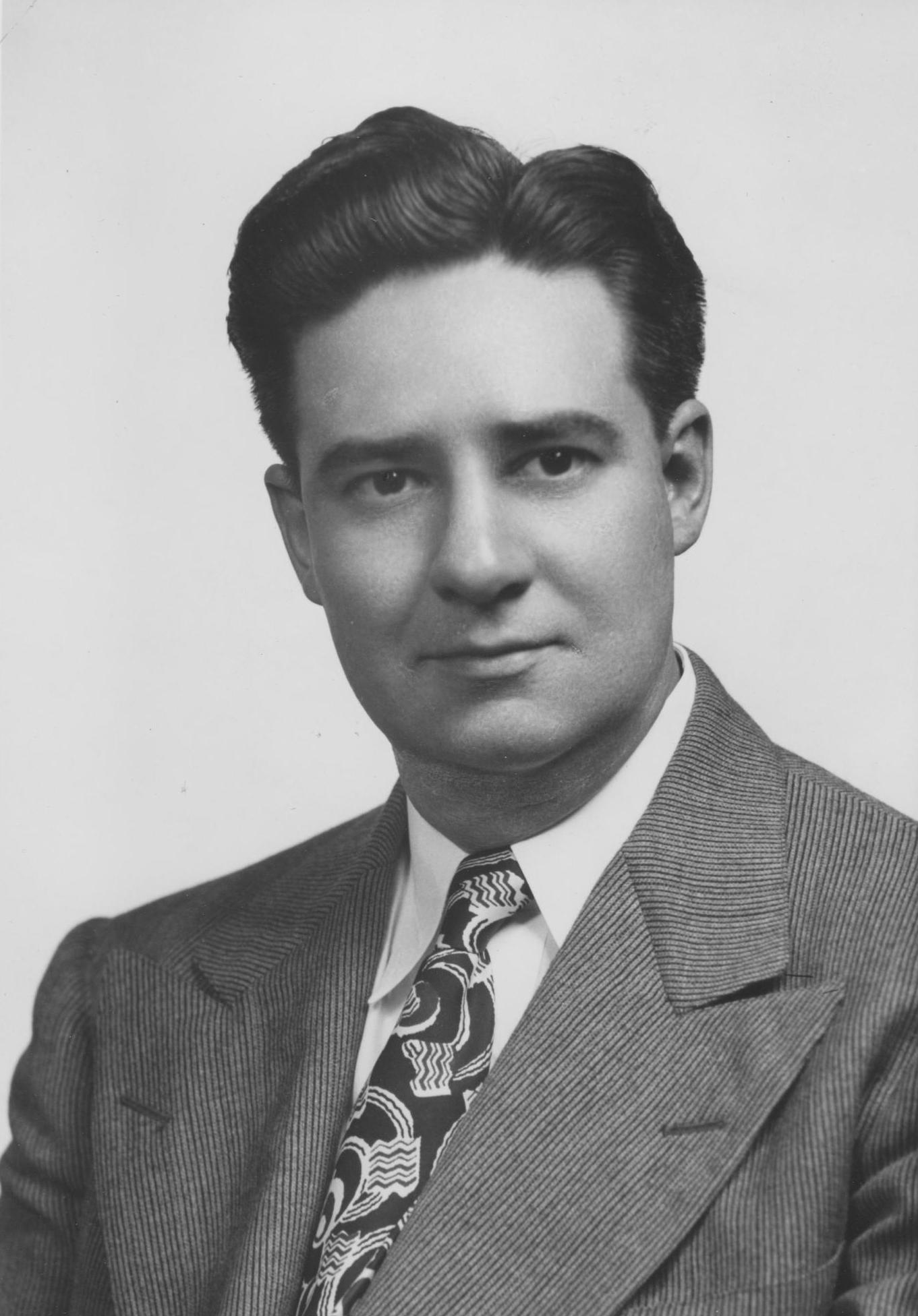
Joseph M. Ford Original Campaign Head Shot

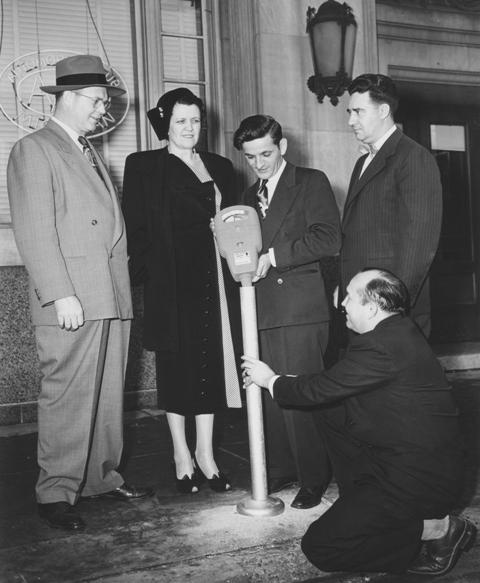
Parking Meter Installation (Joseph Back Far Right)

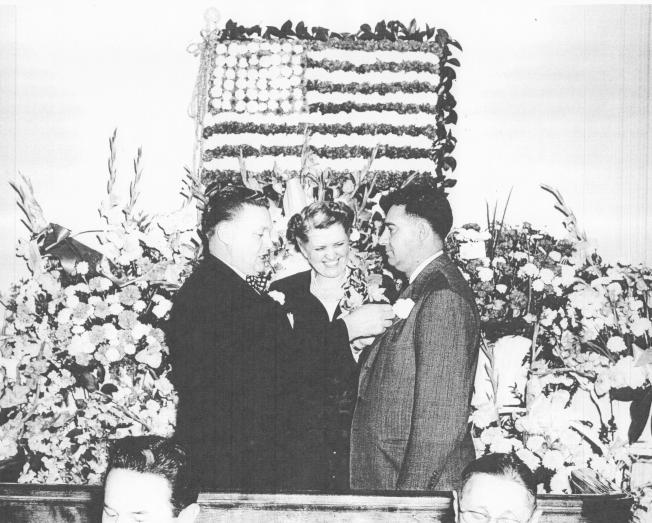
Joseph M. Ford

== See also ==
- Orville L. Hubbard
