= VST =

VST may refer to:

== Groups, companies, organizations ==
- Vancouver School of Theology, a theological graduate school in British Columbia, Canada
- Public Security Service (VST, Lithuanian: Viešojo saugumo tarnyba), a Lithuanian law enforcement agency
- VST Industries (Vazir Sultan Tobacco Company), Hyderabad, India
- VST Enterprises, a cybertech company
- Towner Railway (reporting mark VST)

== Arts, entertainment, media ==
- Virtual Studio Technology, Steinberg's standard for audio software plug-ins
  - in particular, may refer to some versions of the Steinberg Cubase program
- .vst, the file extension for Truevision Vista graphics
- VST (album), a 1978 album by VST & Company
- VST & Company, a Philippine disco band
- Star Trek: Very Short Treks, an animated comedy anthology TV series

== Transportation and vehicular ==
- BusTech VST, the VST, a line of buses from BusTech
- Vapor Separator Tank (VST) is a component in fuel systems, particularly in marine and automotive applications. Its primary function is to separate liquid fuel from vaporized fuel, preventing liquid fuel from entering the charcoal canister or fuel injection system.
- Vehicle safety technology
- Vertical Spinning Tunnel at RAE Bedford, a vertical wind tunnel
- Stockholm Västerås Airport (IATA airport code VST), Sweden

== Other uses ==
- VLT Survey Telescope, a wide-field telescope on Cerro Paranal, Chile
- Venezuela Standard Time, Venezuela's time zone
- VST Act (Virus-Serum-Toxin Act), a U.S. federal law
- Virus-specific T-lymphocyte; see Primary immunodeficiency
