= Statue of Orville L. Hubbard =

- Location: Dearborn, Michigan, U.S.
- Coordinates: 42°18′29.4″N 83°14′23.76″W
- Opening date: 1989
- Dedicated to: Orville L. Hubbard

A statue of Orville L. Hubbard was installed in 1989 in Dearborn, Michigan, United States. The sculpture was removed in June 2020.

== Description and history ==
A Michigan Historical marker near the statue refers to Hubbard as "an effective administrator" who "made Dearborn known for punctual trash collection", but omits any discussion of his segregationist policies. Some groups had urged the city to remove the statue. In his book, Lies Across America: What Our Historic Sites Get Wrong, James W. Loewen listed the Hubbard statue as one of the Top 20 historical monuments ripe for "toppling", along with the obelisk celebrating the White League in New Orleans and "The Good Darky" statue at the Rural Life Museum in Baton Rouge.

The City removed the statue from its longtime location outside City Hall on September 29, 2015, and placed it at the Dearborn Historical Museum. It was again moved, after complaints it was in too prominent of a location, to the side of the McFadden Ross House, further out of sight. On June 5, 2020, the statue was removed from the outside of the museum and may have been moved to Union City, Hubbard's hometown. Dearborn City Council President Susan Dabaja posted on Facebook that the Hubbard family "will place it at his gravesite."

== See also ==
- List of monuments and memorials removed during the George Floyd protests
