= MANOC =

- Industry: software
- Headquarters: Manchester, England
- Area served: United Kingdom
- Services: server and network

MANOC (Manchester Network Operation Centre) is the home to UKFast's servers and network.

MANOC I & MANOC II originally started as facilities within data centres owned by The University of Manchester. MANOC I was located in the Kilburn Building on Oxford Road (home of the Department of Computer Science). After The University of Manchester realised they did not have sufficient power to grow or maintain the facility if it grew much larger, a new MANOC (MANOC II) was established again with the University of Manchester, this time in the Science Park. It is the UK’s second biggest internet hub and a nerve centre for the North West: almost all of Manchester's net traffic goes through here.

== History and plans ==
MANOC's largest customer UKFast hosts over 2500 rack servers in its facility and as a result of UKFasts growth a new facility was acquired in August 2009 in central Manchester to keep up with the demand in a deal worth £9.6m,
