= Orville L. Hubbard =

American mayor of Dearborn, Michigan

Orville Hubbard

3rd Mayor of Dearborn
- In office January 6, 1942 – January 1, 1978
- Preceded by: John Carey
- Succeeded by: John O'Reilly, Sr.

Personal details
- Born: Orville Liscum Hubbard; April 2, 1903 Batavia Township, Michigan, U.S.
- Died: December 16, 1982 (aged 79) Detroit, Michigan, U.S.
- Party: Republican
- Spouse: Faye Cameron (m. 1927; died 1979)
- Children: 5
- Education: Detroit College of Law

Orville Liscum Hubbard (April 2, 1903 – December 16, 1982) was an American politician who served as the mayor of Dearborn, Michigan, from 1942 to 1978. Hubbard was an effective administrator who served 15 consecutive terms while being nationally known as an outspoken segregationist who sought to keep Dearborn free of the perceived social and political ills of neighboring Detroit. A biographer described Hubbard as a "one-time high school athlete, ex-Marine, nonpracticing attorney, self-acknowledged expert on matters from the milking of cows to the history of the American Revolution, and personal symbol of suburban America's resistance to racial integration."

== Early years ==
Hubbard was born April 2, 1903, in Batavia Township, Michigan, and raised on a farm near Union City. He attended Fordson High School in Dearborn, Michigan. He left high school for Detroit at the age of 18 to work for Dodge in Hamtramck. He then served in the United States Marine Corps from 1922 to 1925, attaining the rank of sergeant. After his military discharge, he worked as a reporter for The Wall Street Journal while he studied at the Detroit College of Law, graduating in 1933. He then worked as an assistant Michigan Attorney General before opening a private law practice in Dearborn. Before being elected mayor of Dearborn in November 1941, Hubbard ran for office unsuccessfully on nine occasions, including three unsuccessful campaigns for mayor of Dearborn, three campaigns for the Michigan State Senate and one each for Congress, Dearborn City Council and township justice of the peace.

== Mayor of Dearborn: 1942–1978 ==
Hubbard was elected mayor 15 times, with his last term in office beginning in 1973. Sometimes referred to as the "Dictator of Dearborn," he regularly won re-election with more than 70% of the vote and once recruited a candidate "to avoid the unseemly appearance of an unopposed election." Hubbard's "opponent" was reportedly seen on more than one occasion wearing a Hubbard button on his jacket. Hubbard suffered a serious stroke on November 3, 1974, and the City Council president served as mayor pro tem, running the city on a day-to-day basis, for the rest of Hubbard's final term.

The Detroit Free Press wrote in 1982 that Hubbard was "an acknowledged master at catering to [his] constituency." Dearborn city councilman Thomas Dolan agreed, saying the "secret to Hubbard's success was that he gave the people what they wanted." Dearborn had a substantial tax base as the home of Ford Motor Company, which allowed Hubbard to provide his constituents with benefits unheard of in other cities of its size. This included low taxes and excellent city services, as well as perks such as a free babysitting service for shoppers, a summer camp in Oakland County, and police escorts home for intoxicated New Year's Eve revelers.

=== Segregationist policies ===
In 1948, Hubbard led a campaign to defeat a referendum to build a low-income housing project in Dearborn on the ground it could turn into a "black slum." Cards opposing the referendum urged Dearborn residents to "keep the Negroes out of Dearborn."

In 1956, Hubbard received national publicity after telling an Alabama newspaper that he favored "complete segregation" of the races.

During the Lyndon B. Johnson administration, the federal government put Hubbard on trial for conspiracy to violate human rights in an incident involving mob vandalism to the home of a man rumored to have sold the home to an African-American. Hubbard was acquitted of the charges.

For many years, Hubbard was unabashed in his comments about segregation. He once told a reporter from the Montgomery Advertiser: "They can't get in here. We watch it. Every time we hear of a Negro moving—for instance, we had one last year—in a response quicker than to a fire. That's generally known. It's known among our own people and it's known among the Negroes here." He also boasted that one of his tactics to discourage blacks who had just moved into Dearborn was by providing police and fire protection that was "a little too good"—wake-up visits every hour or so through the night in response to trouble calls.

Hubbard's other statements on race include the following:

- He once examined the bullet-riddled body of a black man and called it an open-and-shut case of suicide.
- Hubbard was once quoted as saying, "I'm not a racist, but I just hate those black bastards."
- During the 1967 Detroit riots, Hubbard ordered Dearborn police to "shoot looters on sight."
- "I favor segregation," he told The New York Times in 1968. With integration, Hubbard said, "you wind up with a mongrel race."

Hubbard's racial views were not limited to African-Americans. He was known to complain that "the Jews own this country," that the Irish "are even more corrupt than the Dagos," and as Middle Easterners began moving into Dearborn that "the Syrians are even worse than the niggers."

After the civil rights prosecution by the federal government, and investigations by the Michigan Civil Rights Commission, Hubbard was more cautious in his public comments. In an interview with The Detroit News in the early 1970s, Hubbard claimed: "I don't keep the niggers out of Dearborn. I don't keep anybody out of Dearborn. I haven't done anything to encourage 'em. I don't do anything to discourage 'em." In that interview, Hubbard also contended that his "Keep Dearborn Clean" slogan had nothing to do with racial segregation and was based on his efforts to keep Dearborn city politics free of corruption. He asserted: "Our first slogan said, 'Keep Dearborn Clean from Vice, Graft and Corruption.' That's exactly what it means." Even then, however, he noted his alarm that Dearborn was "a little postage-stamp community" that was "surrounded now," and that "eventually they'll overrun the place."

=== Dearborn Towers ===
In 1967, Hubbard led an effort to purchase an eight-story, 88-unit apartment building with canal views in Clearwater, Florida. Though similar proposals had been rejected by Dearborn voters, Hubbard won City Council approval for acquisition of the project, which was renamed "Dearborn Towers." The City paid $1.1 million for the property, which was made available for rental at reduced rates to Dearborn's senior citizens. The complex, a one-mile (1.6 km) walk from the beach, included a heated pool, organized poker nights and other activities. The project was billed in the 1960s as the first attempt by a U.S. city to own property outside the state. In 2007, Dearborn voters authorized selling the property (then valued at over $8 million) to help overcome a city budget deficit.

=== Camp Dearborn ===
During the Hubbard administration, the City of Dearborn also built Camp Dearborn on 626 acres (2.53 km^{2}) in Milford Township, Michigan. Opened on July 4, 1948, Camp Dearborn was Hubbard's pet project, and he was involved in its design. Hubbard dubbed the camp "the citizen's country club."

=== Unsuccessful proposals ===
During his tenure as Dearborn mayor, Hubbard made several unsuccessful proposals, including a proposal to incorporate several other Wayne County suburbs into a super-suburb of Dearborn and a proposal for the City of Dearborn to purchase and operate Detroit's Ambassador Bridge and Detroit-Windsor Tunnel.

== Personal life and death ==
In 1927, Hubbard married the former Faye Cameron (1905–1979) and they raised four sons and a daughter. Their marriage was rocky; though the couple never divorced, they were legally separated from 1965 until Faye's death in 1979. From 1964 to 1982, Orville lived with his companion, Maureen Keane, Dearborn's City Service director.

Hubbard suffered a devastating stroke in 1974, which left him paralyzed and speechless. After a second stroke eight years later, he was admitted to Henry Ford Hospital in Detroit, where he died on December 16, 1982. He was interred at Riverside Cemetery in Union City, Michigan.

== Legacy ==
Hubbard remains a controversial figure in Michigan politics. In his book Detroit Divided, University of Michigan researcher Reynolds Farley found in 2002 that African-Americans in Metro Detroit view Dearborn as harboring racial hostility. Dearborn's African-American population grew from fewer than 100 in 1980 to more than 1,200 in 2000, which represented less than 1.3 percent of the population in a city that borders the predominantly African-American City of Detroit.

Despite their political differences, longtime Detroit mayor Coleman Young spoke positively of Hubbard. In 1991, Young told the Detroit Free Press that "Orville Hubbard was quite a man. Believe it or not, he was a person I admired. He and I disagreed on some things, but he was a hell of a mayor. I regarded him as one of the best mayors in the United States . . . He took care of business. He knew how to meet the needs of his people."

=== Controversy over the Orville Hubbard statue ===
A statue of Orville Hubbard at Dearborn City Hall

A statue of Hubbard erected in 1989 in front of City Hall is a subject of controversy. A Michigan Historical marker near the statue refers to Hubbard as "an effective administrator" who "made Dearborn known for punctual trash collection," but omits any discussion of his segregationist policies. Some groups had urged the City to remove the statue. In his book, Lies Across America: What Our Historic Sites Get Wrong, James W. Loewen listed the Hubbard statue as one of the Top 20 historical monuments ripe for "toppling," along with the obelisk celebrating the White League in New Orleans and "The Good Darky" statue at the Rural Life Museum in Baton Rouge.

The City removed the statue from its longtime location outside City Hall on September 29, 2015 and placed it at the Dearborn Historical Museum. It was again moved, after complaints it was in too prominent of a location, to the side of the McFadden Ross House, further out of sight. On June 5, 2020, the statue was removed from the outside of the museum and may have been moved to Union City, Hubbard's hometown. Dearborn City Council President Susan Dabaja posted on Facebook that the Hubbard family "will place it at his gravesite."

=== Carl Levin's comments at Rosa Parks' funeral ===
In 2005, Senator Carl Levin spoke at the funeral of Rosa Parks, making the following comments about Hubbard: "The South had Orval Faubus; Michigan had Orville Hubbard. Orville Hubbard vowed to keep Dearborn clean, which some like to interpret as keep Dearborn white, despite Hubbard's dedication to a well kept city and strict City Ordinances in regards to property maintenance and the Dearborn Public Schools annual 'Clean Up, Paint Up, Fix Up Parade.'" Levin's comments drew an angry response from Hubbard's family. A letter published in the Detroit Free Press from Hubbard's granddaughter, Susan L. Hubbard, referred to Levin's comments as "mean-spirited ramblings of an arrogant, Washington politician."

=== Musical: "Orvie!" ===
In 2006, Hubbard was the subject of a musical play, Orvie! The musical was written by David L. Good, a former Detroit News reporter and editor, who is the author of a biography of Hubbard, and the composer Bob Milne. Hubbard's daughter, Nancy Hubbard, then the president pro tem of the Dearborn City Council, described the play as "a put-down, like a joke," that distorted her father's contributions. She said her father was a popular mayor who shoveled snow, picked up trash and sent constituents birthday cards and post cards from his travels. "He did everything for this community—the libraries, civic center, the pools. He put Dearborn on the map." The play, while rehearsed, was never produced.

== See also ==
- List of longest-serving United States mayors
