= Joe Ford =

Joseph or Joe Ford may refer to:

- Joseph Dillon Ford (1952–2017), American composer and author
- Joe Ford (jazz musician) (1947–2025), American jazz saxophonist
- Joe Ford (footballer) (1886–?), English footballer
- Joe Ford (rugby union) (born 1990), rugby union footballer
- Joseph M. Ford (1912–1954), member of the Dearborn, MI City Council 1945–1953
- Joe T. Ford (born 1937), CEO and co-founder of Alltel
- Joseph Ford (physicist) (1927–1995), physics professor and author at Georgia Tech
