= Camp Dearborn =

Park in Milford Township, Michigan, US

- Location within Michigan
- Interactive map of Camp Dearborn
- Location: Milford Township, Michigan, U.S.
- Coordinates: 42.5807°N 83.6356°W
- Area: 626 acres (253 ha)
- Created: 1948
- Operator: City of Dearborn
- Status: Open year round
- Website: www.campdearborn.com

Camp Dearborn is a park in Milford Township, Michigan, owned by the city of Dearborn, Michigan. The 626 acres (2.53 km^{2}) park has several ponds and lakes as well as access to the Huron River, a half-mile swimming beach, swimming pool, picnic sites, and camping areas. Activities include fishing, paddle boat rentals, hayrides, dances, miniature golf and a 27-hole golf course. Canoe/kayaks can launch into the Huron River while a bike trail connects to downtown and other local parks. Camping is available for tents and RVs on 191 sites (including a section for permanent trailers) and in 118 permanent tents and 30 cabins.

Camp Dearborn opened on May 29, 1948, under leadership of Mayor Orville L. Hubbard. Services in the park are provided by Dearborn city employees. During the Great Recession, Dearborn investigated selling off the camp but found that the camp was profitable and that there was no prospect of a reasonably profitable sale due to zoning issues.
