= Lawrence Jones (businessman) =

British businessman and sex offender

- Born: Lawrence Nigel Jones; 1 August 1968 (age 58); Denbigh, Wales
- Occupation: Former director of UKFast
- Years active: 1999–present
- Spouse: Gail Jones
- Children: 4 daughters

Lawrence Nigel Jones (born 1 August 1968) is a convicted rapist and business man. Jones is best known for founding UKFast in 1999. In December 2023, Jones was sentenced to a total of 15 years in prison for multiple criminal offences.

== Early life ==
Lawrence Jones was born in Denbigh, North Wales. At seven years old, he won a scholarship to sing and study music at Durham Chorister School before attending Ruthin School when he was 13 years old. At 16, he left home and moved to Manchester.

== Career ==
After previously working as a hotel pianist, Jones formed UKFast with his partner Gail in 1999. The cloud hosting and colocation business operated a data centre complex in Trafford Park, Manchester, and had over 350 employees.

In May 2010, Jones joined the board of the Manchester Camerata.

Jones acquired Le Farinet Hotel in Swiss ski resort Verbier in September 2014.

In June 2017, Jones launched a podcast offering business advice and sharing inspirational stories from people including Sir Richard Branson, Gary Neville and Stacey Copeland.

In December 2018, Jones sold a 30% stake of UKFast for £205 million to private equity firm Inflexion and in May 2020, it was reported in The Financial Times that Jones and his wife "have both now left the business and will no longer have any role in it".

== Allegations and criminal convictions ==
In October 2019, an investigation by the Financial Times reported that Jones faced multiple allegations by former employees of bullying, sexual harassment and sexual assault. Many of the allegations include claims of unwanted physical contact and verbal abuse in the work place and molestation whilst on company trips abroad. This resulted in his resignation and the prospect his wife Gail would become CEO. An internal investigation into the allegations started in late October 2019, which UKFast was quoted as "taking very seriously".

On 1 November 2019, Greater Manchester Police confirmed that they had interviewed Jones in relation to two allegations of sexual assault and that enquiries were ongoing.

In January 2021, Jones was charged with one count of rape and four counts of sexual assault. In April 2021, he was charged with a further count of rape. Trial for the first charges was initially scheduled for February 2022. His trial began in November 2023 at Manchester Crown Court in relation to two counts of alleged rape, said to have taken place in the 1990s. He was found guilty of both charges, following another guilty verdict earlier in the year of one sexual assault.

On 1 December 2023, Jones was sentenced to a total of 15 years in prison and was ordered to sign the Sex Offenders Register for life. Jones received a 14-year sentence for one of the rapes, a seven-year concurrent jail term for the second, and a 12-month consecutive custodial sentence for the sexual assault.

He was previously convicted in January 2023 of assaulting a female employee. A second trial in November 2023 found Jones guilty of drugging and raping two women when he was a hotel bar pianist in the 1990s.

Jones is currently being held in HM Prison Birmingham.

== Personal life ==
Lawrence and Gail Jones have four daughters. They lived in Cheshire when Jones was convicted.

In 2001, Jones was caught in an avalanche whilst skiing off-piste in Alpe D'huez, France. Jones was resuscitated before being airlifted to Grenoble hospital.

He owns Castell Cidwm estate near the village of Betws Garmon; it was originally owned by the Marquis of Anglesey, who used the Castell Cidwm country house as his hunting lodge. He has built a wall that has prevented local people from accessing the lake, causing considerable local objections.

He was appointed Member of the Order of the British Empire (MBE) in the 2015 New Years Honours List. In December 2024, Jones' MBE was 'cancelled and annulled' following his convictions for multiple offences.

Jones was awarded an honorary doctorate of business administration from Manchester Metropolitan University in 2016. In November 2023, a spokesperson for the university confirmed it had been 'formally rescinded' after Jones was convicted of two counts of rape and one count of sexual assault following two trials at Manchester Crown Court.
