= VST Enterprises =

British cybertechnology company

VST Enterprises, Ltd. was a cybertechnology company based in Manchester and New York founded by Louis-James Davis. In 2017 the company was valued at £234 million based on inbound investments.

It operated in more than 16 countries in which it could use its VCode system to provide secure financial transactions, virtual mobile wallet payments, and secure identification and authentication. It launched a subsidiary in Pakistan in June 2020 with Shaz Sulaman and Ajaz Sulaman. The VCode is like a circular QR Code.

It had a contract with the Zimbabwe government to use its technology to tackle illegal mining, counterfeiting and issues with border control, as well as introducing identity cards and tax collection for informal businesses. Louis-James Davis was appointed Science & Technology Ambassador for the country by President Emmerson Mnangagwa at the World Economic Forum in Switzerland.

In May 2020 it was reported to be in discussions with NHSX and the Home Office about using its VCode technology with the V-Health Passport|url=https://v-health.com |.

In June 2020 Richard Caborn, the former sports minister, reported that the firm was involved in designing the V-Health Passport being considered by ministers and the Premier League to see if the digital passport would allow fans to start coming back to football matches.

The company went into administration in 2022 after its parent company Davis Co. Holdings, owned by Louis-James Davis withdrew funding.
