= UKFast =

Former British internet hosting company

UKFast.Net Limited
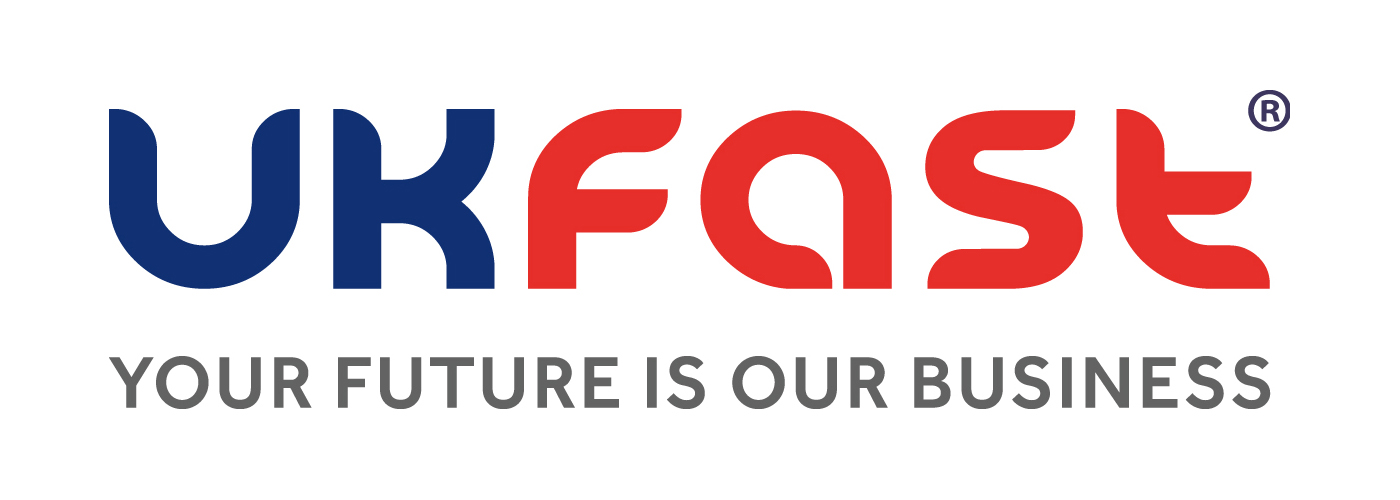
- Type: Private
- Industry: Internet hosting
- Founded: 1999
- Founder: Lawrence Jones and Gail Jones
- Headquarters: UKFast Campus, Birley Fields, Hulme, Manchester, M15 5QJ
- Key people: Chairman; Richard Bishop; CEO; Richard Thompson; Technical Director; Neil Lathwood; Managing Director; Vacant
- Website: www.ukfast.co.uk

UKFast.Net Limited (trading as UKFast) was a business-to-business internet hosting company based in Manchester, England. It was principally known for managed hosting, cloud services, and co-location. The business owned and operates its data centre complex in Trafford Park.

In 2019, the company employed more than 365 people and in 2018 achieved revenues of £53.9 million.

It provided services to more than 5,000 clients including the NHS, the Ministry of Defence and the Cabinet Office.

Since June 2022, UKFast.Net Limited and ANS Group Limited, which are both controlled by private equity group Inflexion, merged and have become ANS.

== Company history ==
UKFast was founded in September 1999 by Welsh businessman Lawrence Jones and his wife Gail Jones.

In 2007, the company moved its head office to the 28th floor of City Tower in Manchester. It acquired further space on the 16th floor, before moving in 2013 to a campus at 1 Archway in the Birley Fields area of Hulme, Manchester.

In 2013, the firm launched eCloud, a range of cloud hosting services whose hardware infrastructure reportedly cost £12 million to build. In that year, the business turned over £23.4 million. For the year ending 31 December 2014, UKFast reported a 24 per cent turnover increase from £23.4 million to £28.9 million. Between 2011 and 2015, UKFast invested more than £25 million into capital expenditure projects including the development of four data centres and the flagship UKFast Campus.

In 2013, UKFast opened an office in Glasgow and in 2015 opened a further office in London.

In 2014, founder Lawrence Jones rejected a reported £200 million takeover bid amidst a trend of web hosting consolidation, citing that the business was still growing.

In 2016, UKFast doubled the size of its headquarters by securing a further 40,000 sq ft (3,700 m^{2}) of space at 3 Archway, Birley Fields, adjacent to its existing building.

In 2018, a 30% stake of UKFast was sold to private equity firm Inflexion for around £120 million

On 31 October 2019, CRN reported "Lawrence Jones quits UKFast following sexual misconduct allegations – Financial Times article accused Jones of sexual assault and harassment last week". Jones' wife and current UKFast managing director Gail Jones took over his responsibilities, according to the article.

On 6 May 2020, the Joneses exited the business along with Secarma through a sale to existing private equity investor Inflexion.

On 1 December 2023, Lawrence Jones was sentenced to a total of 15 years in prison for two rapes and a sexual assault after a trial at Manchester Crown Court. He was ordered to sign the Sex Offenders Register for life.

== Awards and accreditations ==
Between 2005 and 2009, UKFast won six Internet Service Providers Association awards and was named "Best Hosting Provider" for four years running.

UKFast received the Data Centre Solutions Awards' "Private Cloud Product of the Year" in 2012 and the DatacenterDynamics Award for "Innovation in Outsourcing" in 2013.

In the same year, UKFast received the National Business Awards "Employer of the Year" award and the Institute of Customer Service "Employee Engagement Strategy of the Year" award.

UKFast has also featured in The Sunday Times' "100 Best Small Companies to Work For" and the Great Place to Work Institute's "Best Workplaces" lists, placing 7th and 8th respectively in 2019, 9th and 25th respectively in 2018, and 5th in both lists in 2017. They placed 28th and 12th respectively in 2014, 25th and 5th respectively in 2013, and 45th and 7th respectively in 2012.
