= The Good Darky =

Statue originally erected in Louisiana

Coordinates: 30.41108394382561°N 91.1142520289777°W

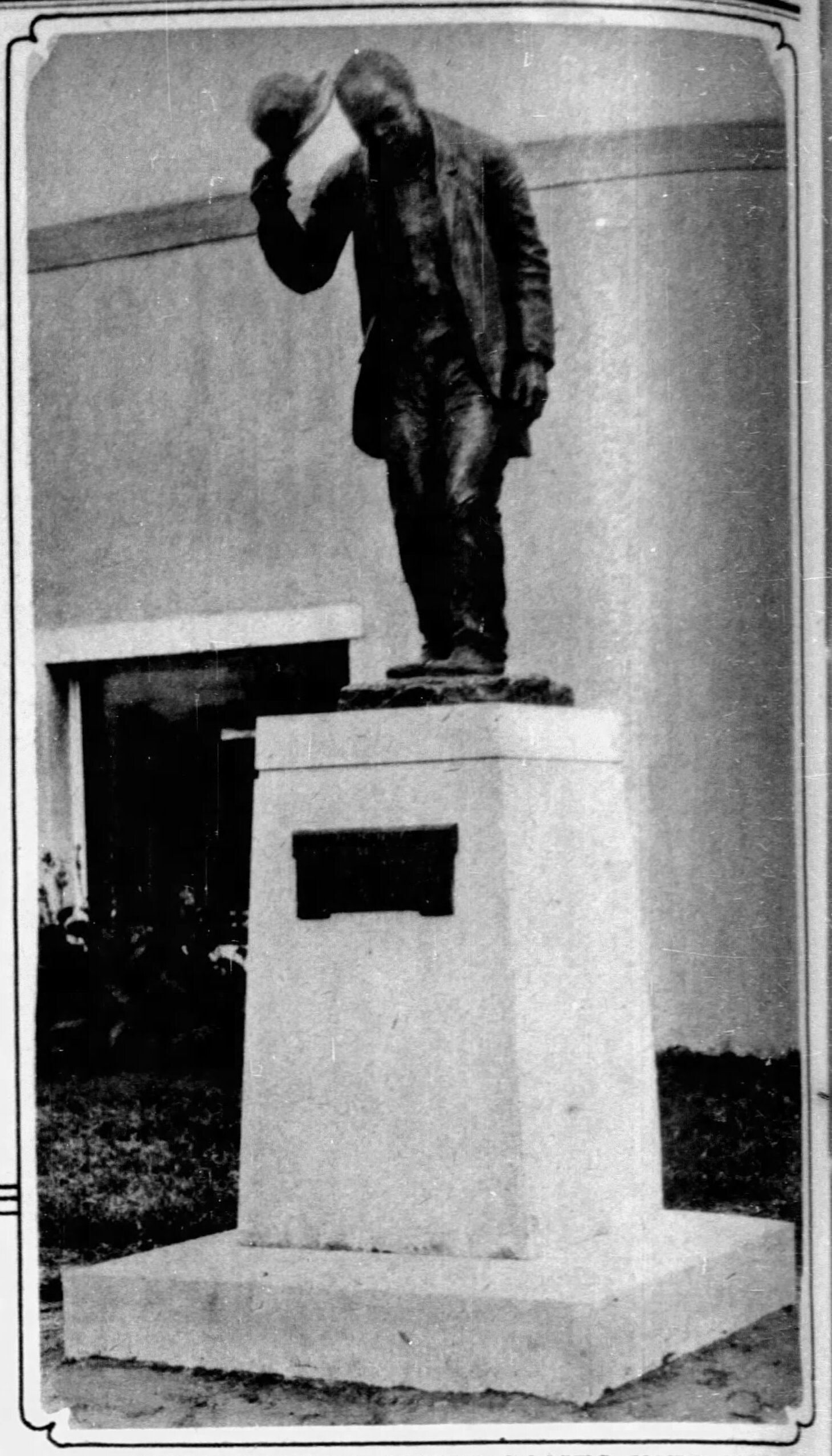
The subservient Good Darky, head bowed and hat removed as a symbol of submission, greeted citizens in downtown Natchitoches for forty years. 1927 photo.

The Good Darky (also called Uncle Jack) is a controversial 1927 American statue of a generic, unnamed, elderly African American man. Originally erected in Natchitoches, Louisiana, it stood there until 1968, but is now in a back lot off a gravel road at the Louisiana State University Rural Life Museum in Baton Rouge.

== Background ==
In the period 1890–1940, a second wave of Confederate statues was erected, coinciding with and supporting the "Lost Cause of the Confederacy" movement and the triumphal years of the Jim Crow laws. While the first wave of memorialization had been of heroes such as Robert E. Lee, the second wave also included memorials to groups – the Confederate soldiers, the homefront woman, and, in a very few cases, the loyal African-Americans.

In 1894 Confederate Veteran, a magazine edited and published by Confederate veterans of the Civil War, offered an op-ed proposing the erection of new statues throughout the South in honor of the supposedly faithful slaves who stayed behind on their enslavers’ properties during the war:

It seems opportune now to erect monuments to the Negro race of the war period... What figure would be looked upon with kindlier memory than old 'Uncle Pete' and 'Black Mammy'... There is not of record in history of subordination and faithful devotion by any race of people comparable to the slaves of the Southern people during our great four years war for independence.

== Description and history ==
The statue depicts an older African-American man – perhaps a slave, or perhaps a citizen in post-emancipation times – in an obsequious pose, head bowed and hat in hand. The original inscription read

In Grateful Recognition of the Arduous and Faithful Service of the Good Darkies of Louisiana

The bronze statue was commissioned in 1927 by Jackson Lee "Jack" Bryan, a cotton planter and businessman. It was executed by Hans Schuler and installed in a park on the river in downtown Natchitoches. Time magazine said "[Jackson] had been lulled to sleep in his babyhood by Negro spirituals, and had played with little slave boys on his father's old plantation, so he recently felt the urge to do something big for the Negro", while the New York Times said "Many white people in the parish have been nursed or served by the old-time 'uncles' and 'aunties', and a warm regard remains on each side." In fact, Bryan's sister had warned him that the statue might not be tolerated by some in the local white community.

The Good Darky statue did become accepted by the white community, and within a few years, a tale gained popularity with whites that inebriated African Americans heading home after night out would ask Uncle Jack the way home, and the statue would direct them correctly. This legend reinforced the white narrative of African Americans as hapless and superstitious dolts.

The Natchitoches African-American community, however, did not generally like the statue, as it promoted a subservient and menial view of the race; and during the civil rights era the statue came under protest, and in 1968 it was gone, either toppled into the Cane River or peacefully removed by the city.

It was retrieved from the river (if indeed it was thrown there) and put into storage, and later donated by Ryan's estate to the Rural Life Museum in 1974, although the Smithsonian Institution had also asked for it. Originally set outside the Museum's main entrance, it has since been moved to an out-of-the-way back lot.

The purpose and effect of the statue has been criticized:

Uncle Jack is the quintessential obsequious Negro servant. . . . The droop of his shoulders bears witness not only to his years but more specifically to his own understanding of his place as a poor black in a rich white world

— Maya Angelou, 1997

[E]very adult who lived in the segregated South knew the terror on which segregation rested... That is why 'The Good Darky' bows his head; ultimately, he doesn't want to be killed.

— James W. Loewen, 1999
