= Development =

Development or developing may refer to:

== Arts ==
- Development (music), the process by which thematic material is reshaped
- Photographic development
- Filmmaking, development phase, including finance and budgeting
- Development hell, when a project is stuck in enduring development
- Development (band), English progressive pop rock band
- Development (album), a 2002 album by Nonpoint

== Business ==
- Business development, a process of growing a business
- Career development
- Corporate development, a position in a business
- Energy development, activities concentrated on obtaining energy from natural resources
- Fundraising, also called "development"
- Green development, a real estate concept that considers social and environmental impact of development
- Land development, altering the landscape in any number of ways
- Land development bank, a kind of bank in India
- Leadership development
- New product development
- Organization development
- Professional development
- Real estate development
- Research and development
- Training and development

== Biology and medicine ==
- Adult development, between adolescence and the end of life
- Child development, between birth and the end of adolescence
- Development (journal), an academic journal in developmental biology
- Developmental biology, the study of the process by which organisms grow and develop
- Developmental psychology, the scientific study of how and why human beings change over the course of their life
- Drug development, the entire process of bringing a new drug or device to the market
- Embryogenesis, or development, the process by which the embryo is formed
- Human development (biology), the process of growing to maturity
- Human tooth development or odontogenesis
- Neural development, the processes that generate, shape, and reshape the nervous system
- Personal development, or self-help
- Prenatal development, the process in which a human embryo or fetus gestates during pregnancy
- Youth development

== Computing ==
- Artificial development, an area of computer science and engineering
- Mobile app development, act or process by which a mobile app is developed
- Software development, the development of a software product
- Video game development
- Web development, work involved in developing a web site

== Social science ==
- Community development, practices to improve various aspects of communities
- Developing country, a nation with a lesser developed industrial base
- Development aid, financial aid given by governments and other agencies
- Development communication
- Development geography, a branch of geography which refers to the standard of living and quality of life of inhabitants
- Development plan, a local authority's policies and proposals for land use
- Development studies, examines socioeconomic growth and development, especially in developing countries, and may overlap with postcolonial studies
- Development theory
- Economic development, the process by which a nation improves the economic, political, and social well-being of its people
- European Development Fund, the main instrument for European Union (EU) aid for development
- Human development (behavioral), the science that seeks to understand how and why people of all ages and circumstances change or remain the same over time, see Developmental psychology
- Human Development Index, used to rank countries by level of human development
- International development, usually level of economic development
- Regional development, aid and assistance to regions which are less economically developed
- Rural development, the process of improving the quality of life and economic well-being of people living in rural areas
- Sociocultural evolution, how cultures and societies have changed over time
- Sustainable development

== Other uses ==
- Development (differential geometry), rolling one smooth surface over another
- Development (drafting), a type of technical drawing
- Development (topology), a countable collection of open coverings
- Development, a term used in chess
- Development of doctrine, a term used by John Henry Newman to describe Catholic teachings
- Driver development program, a program used by racing teams to develop younger drivers
- MFA Development, a Macanese football club

== See also ==
- Develop (disambiguation)
- Elaboration (disambiguation)
- Evolution, changes to a species over generations
