= Elaboration =

Elaboration may refer to:

== Music ==
- Elaboration, a type of variation (music)
- Prolongation, a central principle in the music-analytic methodology of Schenkerian analysis
- Elaborating instruments, or panerusan in Indonesian gamelan music

=== Albums ===
- Elaborations, a 1982 Arthur Blythe album
- Elaboration of Particulars, a 2021 album by Tony Oxley and Alan Davie
- Elaborations of Carbon, the 2002 debut album by the Yob (band)

== Other uses ==
- Progressive elaboration, a process for creating a work breakdown structure in project management
- Conceptual elaboration, the Buddhist concept of conceptual proliferation
- Elaboration likelihood model, a psychological theory on the change of attitudes
- Elaboration principle, a process of recruiting new members into a group

== See also ==
- Centre for Materials Elaboration and Structural Studies, a laboratory in Toulouse, France
- Elaborate Bytes, the Swiss software development company that helped create CloneCD
- The Elaborate Entrance of Chad Deity, a 2009 play by Kristoffer Diaz
- Operation Elaborate, the codename of the 2022 iSpoof fraud investigation
- Elaborative interrogation, the use of explanations to help remember information
- Elaborative encoding, a different mnemonic system
