= Susan M. Ervin-Tripp =

American linguist (1927–2018)

- Born: June 29, 1927; Minneapolis, Minnesota
- Died: November 13, 2018 (aged 91); Oakland, California
- Education: Vassar College; University of Michigan
- Scientific career
- Fields: Psychology
- Workplaces: University of California, Berkeley
- Thesis: The Verbal Behaviour of Bilinguals (1955)
- Doctoral advisor: Theodore Newcomb
- Doctoral students: Daniel Kahnemann

Susan Moore Ervin-Tripp (1927–2018) was an American linguist whose psycholinguistic and sociolinguistic research focused on the relation between language use and the development of linguistic forms, especially the developmental changes and structure of interpersonal talk among children.

== Education and career ==
Born Susan Moore Ervin on June 29, 1927, in Minneapolis, Minnesota, she earned her undergraduate degree in Art History at Vassar College. She earned a PhD from the University of Michigan in 1955 for her thesis, entitled The Verbal Behaviour of Bilinguals: The Effect of Language of Report upon the Thematic Apperception Test Stories of Adult French Bilinguals, under the supervision of Theodore Newcomb.

She taught at the University of California at Berkeley from 1958–1999.

In her academic work she conducted research on child language acquisition and bilingualism among children and has made contributions to the fields of linguistics, psychology, child development, sociology, anthropology, rhetoric, and women's studies.

She was a doctoral advisor of Daniel Kahneman, a 2002 Nobel Prize winner. She died on November 13, 2018, at age 91.

== Honors and awards ==
Ervin-Tripp was a Guggenheim Fellow in 1974.

A festschrift dedicated to Ervin-Tripp was published in 1996.

A tribute to the work of Susan Ervin-Tripp with a comprehensive bibliography was published by A. Kyratzis in 2020.

== Selected publications ==
- A. Kyratzis and S. Ervin-Tripp. 1999. The development of discourse markers in peer interaction. Journal of pragmatics.
- S. Ervin-Tripp. 1977. Wait for me, roller skate. Child discourse.
- S. Ervin-Tripp. 1976. Is Sybil there? The structure of some American English directives. Language in society.
- S.M. Ervin-Tripp. 1974. Is second language learning like the first? TESOL quarterly.
- S. Ervin-Tripp. 1972. On sociolinguistic rules: Alternation and co-occurrence. Directions in sociolinguistics.
- S.M. Ervin-Tripp. 1969. Sociolinguistics. Advances in experimental social psychology.
- S. Ervin‐Tripp. 1964. An analysis of the interaction of language, topic, and listener. American Anthropologist.
