= Develop =

Develop or DEVELOP may refer to:

- Develop (UK magazine), a UK trade publication for the video game industry
- Develop (Apple magazine), a technical magazine formerly published by Apple Computer
- Develop (chess), moving a piece from its original square
- Develop (producer), hip hop producer known as DVLP
- A stage in photographic processing

== See also ==
- Development (disambiguation)
