= Theodore Newcomb =

American social psychologist (1903–1984)

- Born: July 24, 1903; Rock Creek, Ohio, U.S.
- Died: December 28, 1984 (aged 81); Ann Arbor, Michigan, U.S.
- Education: Oberlin College; Columbia University
- Known for: Proximity principle
- Scientific career
- Fields: Psychologist
- Workplaces: Lehigh University; Case Western Reserve University; Bennington College; University of Michigan
- Thesis: The consistency of certain extrovert-introvert behavior patterns in 51 problem boys (1929)
- Doctoral students: Joseph E. McGrath; Susan M. Ervin-Tripp; Kamla Chowdhry

Theodore Mead Newcomb (July 24, 1903 – December 28, 1984) was an American social psychologist, professor and author. Newcomb led the Bennington College Study, which looked at the influence of the college experience on social and political beliefs. He was also the first to document the effects of proximity on acquaintance and attraction. Newcomb founded and directed the doctoral program in social psychology at the University of Michigan. A Review of General Psychology survey, published in 2002, ranked Newcomb as the 57th most cited psychologist of the 20th century.

== Biography ==
=== Early life ===
Theodore Newcomb was born in Rock Creek, Ohio, on July 24, 1903. His father was a minister. The Newcombs were ostracized for coming out against the Ku Klux Klan when Theodore was growing up. Newcomb attended small rural schools until he started high school in Cleveland. He graduated as valedictorian of his high school, and during his address he criticized the New York State Legislature for "Having denied seats to two legally elected members on grounds that they were bolshvistic socialists." Newcomb graduated summa cum laude from Oberlin College in 1924 and attended Union Theological Seminary. While at seminary, Newcomb decided to become a psychologist. He completed a PhD at Columbia University in 1929 where he worked closely with Goodwin Watson and Gardner Murphy.

=== Career ===
Newcomb held academic appointments at Lehigh University (1929-1930), Case Western Reserve University (1930-1934), Bennington College (1934-1941) and the University of Michigan (1941-1972). He served in the military during World War II between 1942 and 1945, assigned to the Foreign Broadcast Intelligence Service in the Office of strategic Services and in the U.S. Strategic Bombing Survey. Shortly after his return from the war, Newcomb founded Michigan's Survey Research Center, which became the Institute for Social Research. He also founded Michigan's doctoral program in social psychology with Robert Angell and Donald Marquis, and he chaired the program from 1947 to 1953. He was also editor of Psychological Review from 1954-1958

=== Death ===
Newcomb died at home in Ann Arbor, Michigan, in 1984 at 81 years old. He had suffered a stroke three weeks earlier. He was survived by his wife, the former Mary Esther Shipherd; two daughters, Esther Goody, of Cambridge, England, and Suzanne Mosher, of Chelsea, Michigan; a son, Theodore M. Newcomb, Jr., of Seattle; seven grandchildren, and a sister, Constance Eck, of East Lansing, Michigan.

== Contributions ==
=== Bennington College study ===
He studied the kinds of individual and small-group teachings that were possible at a small college. After a four-year longitudinal study he was able to show degrees of change concerning then contemporary public issues and how that varied directly with length of stay in the college and the status position within the student body. 25 years later a follow-up study supported his original data. This study is known as the Bennington College Study, and still highly discussed in social psychology. He developed many longitudinal studies, something that was considered a novelty in the psychological field.

=== Acquaintance process ===
One of Newcomb's greatest contributions involved his study of the acquaintance process. Newcomb offered 17 men entering college free rent as long as they recorded their attitudes, likes, and dislikes each week. The study led to a number of principles of attraction that lead to the formation of groups both elaborated by Newcomb, and then later by other researchers.

=== Proximity principle ===
The proximity principle is the tendency for individuals to associate, befriend, and be attracted to those who are nearby. Newcomb assigned each of the young women in his Bennington College study into their rooms at random. Therefore, they were each paired with a roommate at random. Despite the random assignment most of the roommates were close friends by the end of the study.

These results have been further corroborated by findings showing students becoming friends with students adjacent to them in assigned seating, and college students sending more emails to students in nearby dorms as opposed to far away.

=== Elaboration principle ===
The elaboration principle is the tendency for groups to form when smaller groups (e.g. dyads and triads) develop ties and linkages to form larger more functional groups. Essentially, core group members tend to reach out and create new acquaintances, allowing the group to expand through the elaboration principle.

Newcomb found that many of the dyads in his Bennington College study consisted of roommates and individuals in adjoining rooms. These soon grew as other individuals became attracted to members of these dyads, allowing the smaller groups to grow and amalgamate.

This has been further corroborated by studies observing groups of individuals like peer-groups, and social movements.

=== Similarity principle ===
The Similarity principle is the tendency for individuals to join groups in which the members are similar to them in some way. Newcomb found that his sample consisted of two main sub-groups. A group of nine and a group of seven (One young man was outside both of these groups, adding to the total of 17 men). The two sub-groups were separated by both their interests and backgrounds. For example, one group favored liberal politics and religious ideas, were enrolled in the arts college, were from the same part of the country, as well they shared comparable aesthetic, social, and theoretical views. The other group, however, were all veterans, engineering majors, and shared comparable political, religious, and economic views.

The types of similarities that can attract group members to each other can be related to values, attitudes, and beliefs. They can also consist of more irrelevant similarities such as race, sex, age, and other demographic factors.

=== Other principles of attraction ===
These additional principles that grew out of Newcomb's initial work have been worked on mostly by other researchers, and some have had conflicting findings within the research.

==== Complementarity principle ====
The tendency for individuals to seek members that are dissimilar in ways that fit well with the other group members. For example, someone who enjoys leading would fit well with followers as opposed to other leaders.

Some research has found that in dyads similarity is much more common a reason to join a group, while other studies have found close groups will often have complementary, but dissimilar needs.

==== Reciprocity principle ====
The tendency for individuals to respond favorably when others accept them or act approvingly towards them. Individuals tend to reciprocate liking with liking.

Newcomb and others have found evidence for the principle.

==== Minmax principle ====
The tendency for individuals, as rational creatures, to seek out groups that offer the cost and the greatest.

== Awards ==
- Kurt Lewin Award from Division 9 of the American Psychological Association
- Elected President of the APA in 1956
- Elected to the National Academy of Sciences and the American Academy of Arts and Sciences, 1957
- 57th most eminent psychologist in the 20th century
- Fulbright Research Scholar, London, 1951–52
- Fellow, Center for Advanced Study in the Behavioral Sciences, 1957
- Guggenheim Fellow 1959
- First Annual Research Award, American Educational Research Administration, 1972

== Works ==
- Cohen, Ronald Lee., Newcomb, Theodore Mead., Alwin, Duane Francis. Political Attitudes Over the Life Span: The Bennington Women After Fifty Years. University of Wisconsin Press, 1991.
- Newcomb, Theodore M.: The Love of Ideas (1980)
- Newcomb, Theodore M.: Social Psychology (1950)
- Newcomb, Theodore M., Ralph H. Turner, and Philip E. Converse: Social Psychology: The Study of Human Interaction (1965)
- Newcomb, Theodore M.: Persistence and change: Bennington College and its Students After 25 Years (1967)
- Newcomb, Theodore M.: Personality and social change: Attitude Formation in a Student Community (1943)
- Newcomb, Theodore M.: Experimental Social Psychology (1937)

== See also ==
- List of social psychologists
