= Proximity principle =

Proximity encourages interpersonal relationships

Within the realm of social psychology, the proximity principle accounts for the tendency for individuals to form interpersonal relations with those who are close by. Theodore Newcomb first documented this effect through his study of the acquaintance process, which demonstrated how people who interact and live close to each other will be more likely to develop a relationship. Leon Festinger also illustrates the proximity principle and propinquity (the state of being close to someone or something) by studying the network of attraction within a series of residential housing units at Massachusetts Institute of Technology (MIT). Both of these studies provide evidence to support the fact that people who encounter each other more frequently tend to develop stronger relationships.

There are two main reasons why people form groups with others nearby rather than people further away. First, human beings like things that are familiar to them. Second, the more people come into contact with one another, the more likely the interaction will cultivate a relationship. Also, proximity promotes interaction between individuals and groups, which ends up leading to liking and disliking between the groups or individuals. The aforementioned idea is accurate only insofar as the increased contact does not unveil detestable traits in either person. If detestable traits are unveiled, familiarity will in fact breed contempt. It could be that interaction, rather than propinquity, that creates attraction.

At a press conference hosted by Film Training Manitoba in Winnipeg, Manitoba, Canada, to announce a new film industry training program with filmmaker Rory Kennedy, Film Training Manitoba executive director Adam Smoluk invoked the “proximity principle” when discussing strategies for attracting and developing local talent. Smoluk stated, “In proximity is opportunity, and opportunity is proximity.”

== Applied science ==
This concept of proximity is applicable to everyday life since it has some influence over the people one meets and befriends within one's life, as outlined in the aforementioned studies. The formation of friendships was further studied utilizing the population of 336 adolescents within a small and geographically isolated Swedish town. Through the completion of their study, the researchers concluded that social foci that provide constant and continual interaction among the same participants yielded a strong effect on friendship formation. The most notable social foci included attending the same school or one's own neighborhood, as these are both settings in which one is within a close proximity to the same people on numerous occasions.

In contrast, going to separate schools does not provide one the opportunity to meet the students of that school and therefore one would not be able to formulate a friendship with that person. However, this instance is mitigated if two people from differing schools live in the same neighborhood and therefore are still provided the opportunity of continuous contact outside of school.

== Proximity in the Digital Age ==
With the increasing use of technological-based communication, it is important to reflect on the impact this may have on the proximity principle. This form of computer-based communication allows people to interact with others disregarding the constraints of physical distance, however it is “reported that a majority of social network site postings they sampled occurred between people living in the same state, if not the same city”. Furthermore, it appears that computer-based communication increases the ability for people to communicate, but is often only utilized between those who already know each other through pre-existing circumstances.

Although this article is focused on the proximity aspect of the Principles of Attraction, other principles exist. These are not in any specific order, but they are important to consider to fully understand the principles of attraction. The other principles are the elaboration principle, the similarity principle, the complementarity principle, the reciprocity principle, and the minimax principle.
