= Williams' taxonomy =

Williams' taxonomy is a hierarchical arrangement of eight creative thinking skills conceived, developed, and researched by Frank E. Williams, a researcher in educational psychology. The taxonomy forms the basis of a differentiated instruction curriculum model used particularly with gifted students and in gifted education settings.

The first four levels are essentially cognitive (thinking), while the last four levels are affective (feeling) in nature.

The eight levels are:

1. Fluency, the generation of many ideas, answers, responses, possibilities to a given situation/problem;
2. Flexibility, the generation of alternatives, variations, adaptations, different ideas/solutions/options;
3. Originality, the generation of new, unique and novel responses/solutions;
4. Elaboration, the expansion, enlargement, enrichment or embellishment of ideas to make it easier for others to understand or make it more interesting;
5. Risk-taking, experimenting, trying new challenges;
6. Complexity, the ability to create structure out of chaos, to bring logical order to a given situation and/or to see the missing parts;
7. Curiosity, the ability to wonder, ponder, contemplate or puzzle;
8. Imagination, the ability to build mental pictures, visualise possibilities and new things or reach beyond practical limits.

The purposes of the taxonomy are to teach creative thinking skills, to encourage lateral thinking as well as proactivity, to foster creativity, and to develop students’ creative talents which can be transferred to the changing challenges faced in everyday life.

== Bibliography ==
- Wormeli, R. Fair isn't always equal: assessing & grading in the differentiated classroom p. 67 Stenhouse Publishers, 2006, ISBN 978-157110-424-3
- Schurr, S. Dynamite in the Classroom: A How-To Handbook for Teachers National Middle School Association 1989, ISBN 978-1560900412, Google Books
- Kruse, D. "Thinking Strategies for the Inquiry Classroom" Curriculum Corporation 2009, ISBN 9781742003139

== See also ==
- Bloom's taxonomy – Benjamin S. Bloom's taxonomy of the cognitive domain
- David R. Krathwohl's taxonomy of the affective domain
- J. P. Guilford's structure of intellect model
- Jean Piaget
- Stage theory
