= Elaborative interrogation =

Elaborative Interrogation is a cognitive learning strategy that enhances comprehension and retention by prompting learners to generate explanations for why certain facts or concepts are true. This method encourages deeper processing of information by connecting new material to existing knowledge, thus creating a more integrated understanding.

For example, if a student is learning about the causes of the American Revolution, they might be asked, "Why did the colonists resist British taxation?" By actively exploring this question, the student might recall prior knowledge about the economic strain imposed by the taxes and how it fueled resentment among the colonists. This deeper analysis not only aids in memorizing the fact but also fosters a more profound grasp of the historical context.

Elaborative interrogation is particularly effective in educational settings where critical thinking and comprehension are key. Rather than passively absorbing information, learners engage in a process of inquiry, making the material more relevant and memorable. This technique can be applied across various subjects, from history and science to mathematics and literature, making it a versatile tool in both classroom and self-directed learning environments.

== Effectiveness ==
- There is an integration of new facts with the prior knowledge of the learner.
- This method benefits learners across a relatively wide range of age.
- It can be used by students of varying ability levels.
- Learners were able to generate an adequate answer which is better than no answer.

== Educational implications ==
- Students are taught how to generate questions as well as find answers for the given fact/information.
- Students learn to share their thoughts, and justify and defend their derivation of the answer.
- Students can also form, analyse and clarify their content.
