= Elaboration principle =

Sociological phenomenon

The elaboration principle is when "non-group" members form relationships with an "in-group" member and later are incorporated into the existing "in-group."

== Background ==
The elaboration principle originally stemmed off of a study done by T.M. Newcomb called the acquaintance process. From the acquaintance process Newcomb helped to developed three principles of attraction: Proximity principle, similarity principle, and elaboration principle.

== Recruitment ==
The elaboration principle can be seen in many different groups in society. The areas that the principle is most evident is in recruitment and in friendship circles.

=== Gangs ===
A major formation technique in gangs is through recruitment. Recruitment can be seen in schools, mainly middle and high school, parks, neighborhoods and community centers. Ways that gangs recruit are summarized in four different types: "gangs employ strategies of obligation, coercion, seduction, and subterfuge to attract new members." Seduction is a technique that has been used for a very long time with gangs. They use a form of trickery to make the gang seem more fun and glamorous. "The symbols of the gang (the graffiti, hand signs, colors, tattoos, etc.) create a visual attraction for young people; they realize that with these symbols they are part of something organized and powerful. Parties are also very useful ways for recruiters to seduce young people into the gang. At the party they have fun, get high, and believe the rhetoric they are bombarded with." Gangs will use symbols, either tattoos and graffiti, to create attraction to the potential members as a seduction technique. Self-recruitment, another technique, is used because to some, gangs aren't glamorous and so by making contact with potential members personally draws them in. "For many reasons, youth will make contact with gang members and ask to join the gang. The reasons are many and not always because the individual sees the gang as glamorous. The reason may be one of necessity, money, protection etc.. The reasons may be a combination of all of the trappings mentioned above. The range of reasons for a youth to join a gang is very wide and does not always mean that he has joined the gang open heartedly.

=== Military ===
The most popular age group to recruit for the military is the youth population, because many youth are opting out of going to college because of the economic times and financial positions. "The recruiting process involves national and local advertising to efficiently supply information on a widespread basis; informational visits by recruiters to schools and student groups; traveling military exhibits to provide information to schools and the public; direct mail advertising and telephone solicitation to identify interested youth; web sites to provide information on military services; and contacts and visits with recruiters to qualify leads and to assist youth in gaining needed information about the decision to enlist and the selection of a particular Service."

== Friendship groups ==
=== College dorms ===
The elaboration principle is very prominent in college dorm living. It is one of the major ways students new to college make friends. One source of friendship-making is through the residence assistants (RAs) on each floor. The RAs create different groups and activities to connect the students. "RA, Nicole Laniado, CSOM '13, has done an excellent job fostering community and bringing the girls together. "Not only does she do a great job organizing movie nights, or outings practically every week, but she really has made an effort to bring the floor closer together. And it's worked," says Mariana Eizayaga, a student on Laniado's hall." The students are able to form bonds with each other and the groups then become larger because of the induction of friends that are taking place. "Regardless, the RAs of Fitzpatrick and Gonzaga have put a tremendous amount of effort into fostering bonds between not only themselves and their residents, but within the students on their halls. Required to host at least two programs each month, the residents of these two halls have had the opportunity to attend multiple Table Talks, discussions led by a professor and catered by an outside restaurant."

=== High school cliques ===
In high school, cliques typically tend to form and the groups usually will grow as the age grows. "In elementary school, cliques are hierarchical friendship groups based on popularity and prestige. By the time children reach high school, the clique social hierarchy is stratified. Typically, one finds "jocks," "preppies", or "popular"; "brains," or "nerds"; and "unpopular"." "Though people have secured friendships before high school, often these relationships tend to fluctuate or end completely, and new ones emerge. Students must choose which peers to hang out with and why. This leads to the formation of social groups, or cliques. Cliques can range from a group of acquaintances to the opposite extreme-gangs."

== Usefulness ==
=== Deterring gang membership ===
Gangs are a steadily growing problem in metropolitan and suburban areas alike. And as crime increases, government and local law enforcement officials have been struggling to deter and eliminate these criminally active groups. In order to effectively shrink and extinguish gangs, efforts must be focused on deterring youth from falling into criminal activities. The elaboration principle may help researchers determine why young adults join these gangs, in turn reducing violence and crime. Robert Agnew's "Strain Theory" identifies five types of strain on youth that seem to detect and predict criminal behavior, two of which can be traced back to the elaboration principle. Research has suggested that a youth's interaction with delinquent peers as well as the mere existence of gangs in the individuals neighborhood are strong indicators of gang joining activity. In many cases, young adults are searching for companionship and excitement, two items that gangs readily provide to at-risk-children. These gangs represent a family, people to look up to, and are much more exciting than the classroom to many children. In terms of the elaboration principle, a child may be influenced by an older gang member or classmate to join a gang. An article by Jerome and Glenda Blakemore explains that low-self esteem is a primary reason for gang participation. This child then becomes an in-group member of the gang, and continues the cycle of recruiting other individuals into a life of crime. If community members can establish a strategy limiting children's contact with gangs, as well as reducing contact and association with other delinquent children, youth-at-risk may be less enticed by gangs, and instead encouraged to join after-school programs and engage in activities that keep them off of the streets. By engaging in positive activities and groups, the elaboration principle can be used to reduce the influence of gangs and potentially reduce crime and gang size altogether.

=== Social adjustment ===
High school can yield a wide range of experiences for students, ranging from fulfilling and pleasurable to some to downright worthless and miserable for others. During these malleable and very important years of development, the groups and associations young adults make may have long-lasting effects throughout their lives. Cliques are formed in mid-childhood and vary in size from three to nine individuals. Within these cliques occur the majority of peer interactions with other children, and thus have a large impact on the development of teenagers. Using the elaboration principle, a scenario of a child joining a clique might unfold as follows: a child comes into contact with other children performing various behaviors, and depending on these behaviors identify with a certain group, whether that be the "athletes," "bullies," or "scholars," etc. Through these identifications, out-group members join these groups and become in-group members. Research has shown that children in competent and average clicks display higher personal competence and lower anxiety when compared to children involved in withdrawn/aggressive cliques. If the dynamics of group processes and the elaboration principle are understood, teachers and parents can better understand the children themselves, in turn providing better parental care and more personalized attention within the classroom.

== Practicality ==
The elaboration principle can be put to use in real-world situations when it comes to things like helping to stop kids from joining unsatisfactory peer groups that participate in high risk activities at a young age. "Belonging to a group is an important part of adolescence, and, rather than being ostracized... youth will conform in order to have access to the group". Activities such as being sexually active, and engaging in drug and alcohol use can occur at a young age because youth have friends that are participating in similar behavior. People who are associated with people who engage in delinquent behavior are at a greater risk to engage in that behavior as well; they are drawn to it because of their friends and their family members. Because people will be drawn to groups that have their close friends in them its possible to intervene with programs like Big Brothers Big Sisters of America that form dyadic relationships with people at risk of exhibiting at risk behaviors, children who participate show a noticeable reduction in the likelihood that they would exhibit negative behaviors like drug use, use of alcohol and skipping school.

== See also ==
- Similarity principle
- War on Gangs
- High school bullying
