= List of Trooping the Colour by event from 1890 =

Military ceremony in the British Army

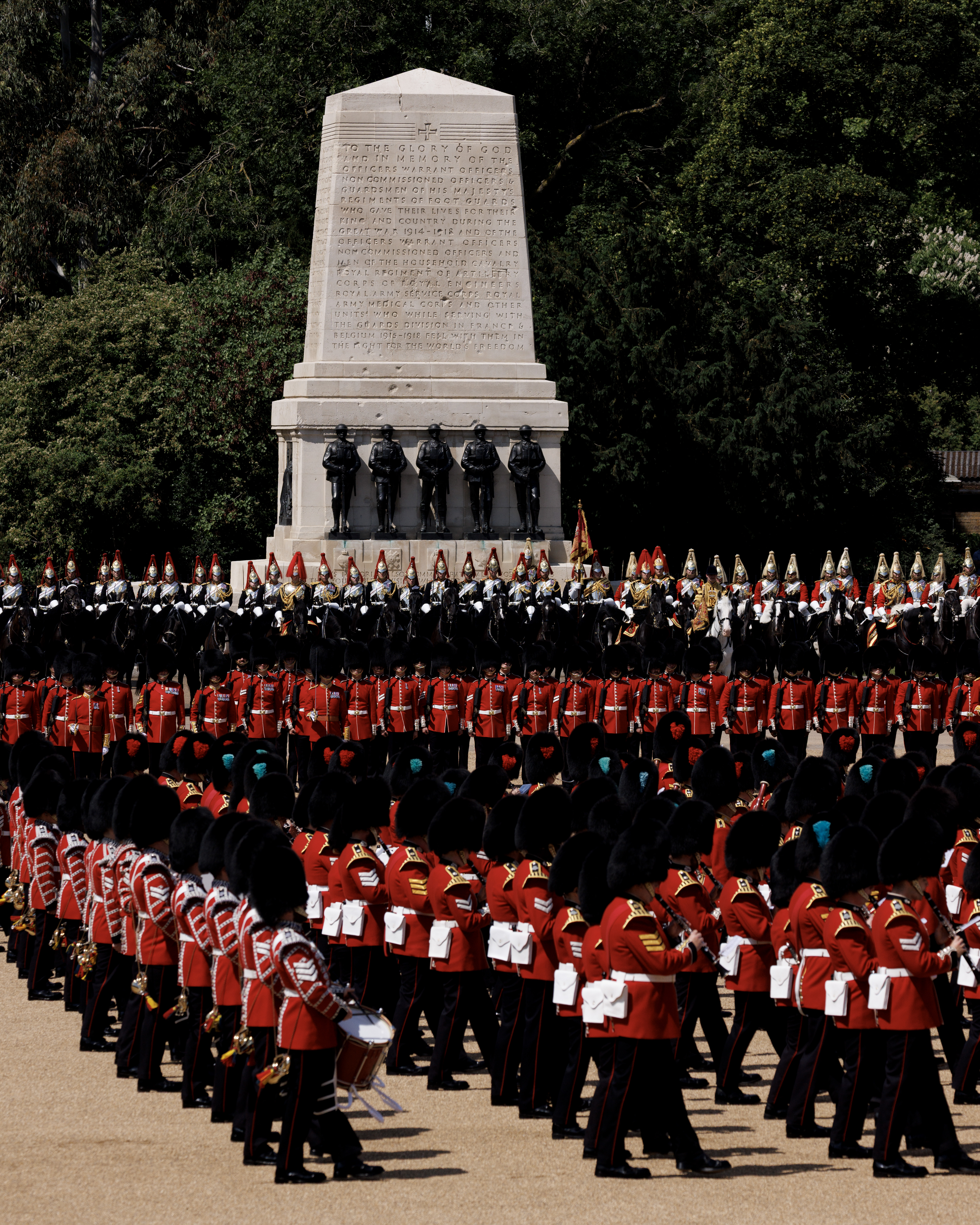

This is a list of Trooping the Colour ceremonies, usually held in London, from 1890 to the present. The first Trooping the Colour on Horse Guards Parade took place on 4 June 1805. In 1895 two Troopings were performed, on consecutive days, by different battalions of the Scots Guards at Windsor Castle and Horse Guards Parade. In the twentieth century, it has generally been held in late May or early June, regardless of the actual date of the monarch's birthday, and since 1959 has been held on a Saturday. There have been some cancellations for various causes including bad weather, national strikes and during both World Wars. The monarch has not always attended the ceremony in person due to illness or state duties, and may be represented by the Prince of Wales or one of the royal dukes.

== Date ranges ==
From 1890 to 1900, for Queen Victoria (born on 24 May), the date was various weekdays from 20 May to 3 June, only one of which was her birthday.

From 1901 to 1909, for King Edward VII (born on 9 November), it was a Friday from 24 May to 28 June.

From 1910 to 1935, for King George V (born on 3 June), it was various weekdays from 27 May to 22 June, most of which were not his birthday.

In 1936, it was on King Edward VIII's actual birthday (23 June).

From 1937 to 1951, for King George VI (born on 14 December), it was from 7 to 12 June.

For Queen Elizabeth II (born on 21 April):

- from 1952 to 1958, it was a Thursday from 31 May to 13 June;
- from 1959 to 1978, it was a Saturday from 2 to 15 June;
- from 1979 to 2017, it was the Saturday from 11 to 17 June (the 2nd Saturday, 8 to 14, of June was a myth);
- from 2018 to 2021, it was the Saturday from 8 to 13 June;
- in 2022 it was Thursday 2 June.

Since 2023, for King Charles III (born on 14 November), it has been held on a Saturday between 13 to 17 June.

== List ==
Year	Date	Colour	Salute taken by	Remarks
1890	Wed 21 May	1st Battalion Scots Guards	The Prince of Wales (Note: The Queen was at Windsor)	
1891	Mon 1 June	1st Battalion Coldstream Guards	No one (Note: The Queen was at Balmoral)	Postponed from 30 May, due to bad weather, and scaled down
1892	Wed 25 May	2nd Battalion Coldstream Guards	The Duke of Cambridge	Other members of the Royal Family were in mourning for the Duke of Clarence
1893	Sat 3 June	2nd Battalion Grenadier Guards	The Duke of Cambridge	
1894	Sat 26 May	2nd Battalion Coldstream Guards	The Prince of Wales	
1895	Fri 24 May	1st Battalion Scots Guards	Queen Victoria	Held at Windsor Castle
1895	Sat 25 May	2nd Battalion Scots Guards	The Prince of Wales	Held at Horse Guards Parade
1896	Wed 20 May	2nd Battalion Coldstream Guards	The Prince of Wales	
1897	Wed 26 May (Note: Gow 1989 has error)	2nd Battalion Coldstream Guards	The Prince of Wales	3rd Battalion Coldstream Guards formed
1898	Sat 21 May	1st Battalion Coldstream Guards	The Prince of Wales	
1899	Sat 3 June	2nd Battalion Coldstream Guards	The Prince of Wales	
1900	Wed 23 May	1st Battalion Grenadier Guards	The Prince of Wales	Royal Guards Reserve Regiment formed one of the Guards
1901	Fri 24 May	3rd Battalion Scots Guards	King Edward VII	Colours presented to the 3rd Battalion Scots Guards
1902	Fri 30 May	1st Battalion Irish Guards	The King	Colours presented to the 1st Battalion Irish Guards
1903	Fri 26 June	2nd Battalion Coldstream Guards	The King	
1904	Fri 24 June	3rd Battalion Coldstream Guards	The Prince of Wales	The King was visiting Germany
1905	Cancelled due to bad weather			
1906	Cancelled due to bad weather			
1907	Fri 28 June	1st Battalion Irish Guards	The King	
1908	Fri 26 June	1st Battalion Coldstream Guards	The King	
1909	Cancelled due to bad weather			
1910	Cancelled due to Court Mourning following the death of King Edward VII roughly a month prior			
1911	Sat 27 May	2nd Battalion Scots Guards	King George V	
1912	Fri 14 June	1st Battalion Grenadier Guards	The King	
1913	Tue 3 June	2nd Battalion Scots Guards	The King	
1914	Mon 22 June	1st Battalion Grenadier Guards	The King	
1915 - 1918	Cancelled due to First World War			
1919	Tue 3 June	3rd Battalion Coldstream Guards	The King	Held in Hyde Park; the largest ever Parade, with 11 Guards (including the Guards Machine Gun Regiment), all in Service Dress
1920	Sat 5 June	1st Battalion Grenadier Guards	The King	Held in Hyde Park; dressed in Service Dress
1921	Sat 4 June	1st Battalion Grenadier Guards	The King	Return to full dress uniform
1922	Sat 3 June	1st Battalion Coldstream Guards	The King	
1923	Sat 2 June	2nd Battalion Scots Guards	The King	
1924	Tue 3 June	2nd Battalion Grenadier Guards	The King	
1925	Wed 3 June	1st Battalion Irish Guards	The King	
1926	Cancelled due to General Strike			
1927	Sat 4 June	3rd Battalion Grenadier Guards	The King	Postponed from 3 June, due to the Epsom Oaks race. First broadcast by BBC Radio, with a commentary by Major J. B. S. Bourne-May, a retired officer of the Coldstream Guards.
1928	Mon 4 June	1st Battalion Welsh Guards	The King	First time for 1st Battalion Welsh Guards to troop their colour
1929	Mon 3 June	3rd Battalion Coldstream Guards	The Duke of Connaught	The King was ill
1930	Tue 3 June	2nd Battalion Scots Guards	The Prince of Wales	The King was ill
1931	Sat 6 June	2nd Battalion Coldstream Guards	The King	Postponed from 3 June, due to the Epsom Derby race
1932	Sat 4 June	2nd Battalion Grenadier Guards	The King	Postponed from 3 June, due to the Epsom Oaks race
1933	Sat 3 June	3rd Battalion Coldstream Guards	The King	
1934	Mon 4 June	1st Battalion Scots Guards	The King	
1935	Mon 3 June	1st Battalion Irish Guards	The King	
1936	Tue 23 June	1st Battalion Grenadier Guards	King Edward VIII	Edward VIII's only Parade as King
1937	Wed 9 June	1st Battalion Coldstream Guards	King George VI	First shown on BBC Television.
1938	Thu 9 June	2nd Battalion Scots Guards	The King	
1939	Thu 8 June	2nd Battalion Grenadier Guards	The Duke of Gloucester	The King was in Canada and the USA; six Guards present. First Trooping to be televised live by the BBC
1940 - 1946	Cancelled due to Second World War			
1947	Thu 12 June	2nd Battalion Coldstream Guards	The King	All ranks wore battle dress; no officers on parade had swords, except the Regimental Sergeant Major. Last Parade when the King was mounted. Rifle No 4 appears.
1948	Cancelled due to bad weather			
1949	Thu 9 June	1st Battalion Welsh Guards	The King	Full dress uniform resumed. The King took the salute in the 1902 State Landau
1950	Thu 8 June	3rd Battalion Coldstream Guards	The King	George VI's last Parade; he took the salute again in the 1902 State Landau
1951	Thu 7 June	3rd Battalion Grenadier Guards	The Duchess of Edinburgh	The King was ill; the princess first wore her red full dress uniform, and rode Winston (chestnut with white left hooves)
1952	Thu 5 June	2nd Battalion Scots Guards	Queen Elizabeth II	Five Guards on parade
1953	Thu 11 June	1st Battalion Grenadier Guards	The Queen	Eight Guards resume. The Duke of Edinburgh present in field marshal's uniform
1954	Thu 10 June	1st Battalion Coldstream Guards	The Queen	Five Guards on parade
1955	Cancelled due to National Rail Strike			
1956	Thu 31 May	3rd Battalion Grenadier Guards	The Queen	Eight Guards resume
1957	Thu 13 June	1st Battalion Irish Guards	The Queen	The Queen first rode Imperial (chestnut with white socks)
1958	Thu 12 June	1st Battalion Scots Guards	The Queen	
1959	Sat 13 June	3rd Battalion Coldstream Guards	The Queen	Start of annual Saturday Parades; 3rd Battalion Coldstream Guards was later placed in suspended animation
1960	Sat 11 June	3rd Battalion Grenadier Guards	The Queen	Each Guard reduced from 76 to 70 Guardsmen; 3rd Battalion Grenadier Guards was later placed in suspended animation First use of L1A1 Self-Loading Rifle.
1961	Sat 10 June	2nd Battalion Scots Guards	The Queen	
1962	Sat 2 June	2nd Battalion Coldstream Guards	The Queen	10th Trooping by the Queen. The Duke of Edinburgh was in North America
1963	Sat 8 June	2nd Battalion Grenadier Guards	The Queen	Seven Guards on parade; the Queen rode a grey horse named "Doctor"
1964	Sat 13 June	1st Battalion Coldstream Guards	The Queen	The Queen rode Imperial
1965	Sat 12 June	1st Battalion Welsh Guards	The Queen	The Queen rode Imperial for the last time
1966	Sat 11 June	1st Battalion Irish Guards	The Queen	The Queen rode Doctor for the 2nd and last time
1967	Sat 10 June	1st Battalion Grenadier Guards	The Queen	The Queen rode the brown horse Neill for the only time
1968	Sat 8 June	2nd Battalion Coldstream Guards	The Queen	Eight Guards; the Queen rode a horse with 3 white socks. (Note: Either Fairlight or Fairway) The Duke of Edinburgh was in Australia
1969	Sat 14 June	1st Battalion Scots Guards	The Queen	The Queen first rode the black mare Burmese
1970	Sat 13 June	2nd Battalion Scots Guards	The Queen	First Trooping to be aired live in colour on BBC1
1971	Sat 12 June	2nd Battalion Grenadier Guards	The Queen	
1972	Sat 3 June	1st Battalion Coldstream Guards	The Queen	20th Trooping by the Queen. A minute's silence for the late Duke of Windsor
1973	Sat 2 June	1st Battalion Welsh Guards	The Queen	All five regiments on parade
1974	Sat 15 June	1st Battalion Irish Guards	The Queen	
1975	Sat 14 June	1st Battalion Grenadier Guards	The Queen	
1976	Sat 12 June	2nd Battalion Coldstream Guards	The Queen	
1977	Sat 11 June	1st Battalion Scots Guards	The Queen	25th Trooping by the Queen, held as part of her nationwide Silver Jubilee celebrations
1978	Sat 3 June	2nd Battalion Grenadier Guards	The Queen	
1979	Sat 16 June	2nd Battalion Scots Guards	The Queen	
1980	Sat 14 June	1st Battalion Irish Guards	The Queen	Six Guards on parade
1981	Sat 13 June	1st Battalion Welsh Guards	The Queen	Blanks fired at the Queen by Marcus Sarjeant. Eight guards resume.
1982	Sat 12 June	1st Battalion Coldstream Guards	The Queen	30th Trooping by the Queen. Guards reduced from eight to six, and a minute's silence, both due to the Falklands War
1983	Sat 11 June	1st Battalion Grenadier Guards	The Queen	Eight Guards resume
1984	Sat 16 June	2nd Battalion Grenadier Guards	The Queen	
1985	Sat 15 June	2nd Battalion Coldstream Guards	The Queen	
1986	Sat 14 June	1st Battalion Scots Guards	The Queen	Last Parade when the Queen was mounted (on Burmese)
1987	Sat 13 June	2nd Battalion Scots Guards	The Queen	From this Parade onwards, the Queen was driven in a carriage, without uniform
1988	Sat 11 June	1st Battalion Irish Guards	The Queen	All five regiments on parade. First trooping using L85A1 (SA80) Rifle.
1989	Sat 17 June	1st Battalion Coldstream Guards	The Queen	
1990	Sat 16 June	1st Battalion Welsh Guards	The Queen	
1991	Sat 15 June	2nd Battalion Grenadier Guards	The Queen	
1992	Sat 13 June	1st Battalion Grenadier Guards	The Queen	40th Trooping by the Queen. Last Parade with eight Guards. Last appearance of Diana, Princess of Wales in the official party
1993	Sat 12 June	2nd Battalion Coldstream Guards	The Queen	Six Guards on parade. The 2nd Battalions of the Coldstream Guards and Scots Guards were later placed in suspended animation; in future parades they would be represented by No. 7 Company and F Company respectively
1994	Sat 11 June	2nd Battalion Grenadier Guards	The Queen	2nd Battalion Grenadier Guards was later placed in suspended animation, represented by Nijmegen Company
1995	Sat 17 June	1st Battalion Scots Guards	The Queen	
1996	Sat 15 June	1st Battalion Irish Guards	The Queen	
1997	Sat 14 June	2nd Battalion Scots Guards (represented by F Company)	The Queen	First appearance of the King's Troop, Royal Horse Artillery
1998	Sat 13 June	1st Battalion Welsh Guards	The Queen	
1999	Sat 12 June	1st Battalion Coldstream Guards	The Queen	
2000	Sat 17 June	2nd Battalion Coldstream Guards (represented by No. 7 Company)	The Queen	
2001	Sat 16 June	2nd Battalion Grenadier Guards (represented by Nijmegen Company)	The Queen	It was the final Birthday Parade of Queen Elizabeth The Queen Mother before her death on 30 March 2002.
2002	Sat 15 June	1st Battalion Scots Guards	The Queen	50th Trooping by the Queen, held as part of her nationwide Golden Jubilee celebrations
2003	Sat 14 June	1st Battalion Grenadier Guards	The Queen	First time the Duke of Edinburgh arrived with the Queen in a carriage and not on horseback
2004	Sat 12 June	1st Battalion Grenadier Guards	The Queen	
2005	Sat 11 June	1st Battalion Irish Guards	The Queen	First appearance of Camilla, Duchess of Cornwall in the official party
2006	Sat 17 June	1st Battalion Welsh Guards	The Queen	The Duchess of Cornwall was not present due to the death of her father Bruce Shand a week earlier.
2007	Sat 16 June	2nd Battalion Coldstream Guards (represented by No. 7 Company)	The Queen	
2008	Sat 14 June	1st Battalion Welsh Guards	The Queen	
2009	Sat 13 June	1st Battalion Irish Guards	The Queen	Seven Guards on parade
2010	Sat 12 June	1st Battalion Grenadier Guards	The Queen	Six Guards resume
2011	Sat 11 June	1st Battalion Scots Guards	The Queen	William, Duke of Cambridge rode in escort behind the Queen's carriage as the colonel of the Irish Guards. The Duchess of Cambridge was driven in procession for the first time
2012	Sat 16 June	1st Battalion Coldstream Guards	The Queen	60th Trooping by the Queen, held as part of her nationwide Diamond Jubilee celebrations
2013	Sat 15 June	1st Battalion Welsh Guards	The Queen	The Duke of Edinburgh was ill, the Duke of Kent taking his place
2014	Sat 14 June	2nd Battalion Grenadier Guards (represented by Nijmegen Company) (Note: Court Circular claims 1st Battalion Grenadier Guards)	The Queen	
2015	Sat 13 June	1st Battalion Welsh Guards	The Queen	Welsh Guards celebrated its centenary year.
2016	Sat 11 June	2nd Battalion Coldstream Guards (represented by No. 7 Company)	The Queen	Part of the nationwide celebrations of the Queen's official 90th birthday
2017	Sat 17 June	1st Battalion Irish Guards	The Queen	The Duke of Edinburgh and the Duke of Kent not in uniform
2018	Sat 9 June	1st Battalion Coldstream Guards	The Queen	The Duke of Edinburgh absent; the Duke of Kent flanked the Queen at the saluting base. The Duke of York's first appearance as Colonel of the Grenadier Guards. The Duchess of Sussex first appeared in the official party
2019	Sat 8 June	1st Battalion Grenadier Guards	The Queen	The Duke of Edinburgh absent
2020	Sat 13 June	1st Battalion Welsh Guards	The Queen	A short, private Parade held at Windsor Castle because of the 2020 COVID-19 pandemic, configured for social distancing
2021	Sat 12 June	2nd Battalion Scots Guards (represented by F Company)	The Queen	A short, private Parade held at Windsor Castle because of the 2020–2021 COVID-19 pandemic, configured for social distancing. The Duke of Kent took the place of the recently deceased Duke of Edinburgh
2022	Thu 2 June	1st Battalion Irish Guards	The Prince of Wales (Note: The Queen remained at Buckingham Palace)	The Queen's 70th trooping; moved from 11 June for the Queen's Platinum Jubilee celebrations. She was represented by the Prince of Wales, and later took the salute from the Buckingham Palace balcony. The parade returns after the COVID-19 pandemic.
2023	Sat 17 June	1st Battalion Welsh Guards	King Charles III	The King as Prince of Wales was their Regimental Colonel 1975–2022. All five regiments on parade, plus London Guards serving as street liners. First time Prince Edward, Duke of Edinburgh rode on horseback at the parade. Last parade for the Duke of Kent as Colonel of the Scots Guards. The next year, he would be succeeded by the Duke of Edinburgh.
2024	Sat 15 June	2nd Battalion Irish Guards (represented by No. 9 Company)	The King	First time for 2nd Battalion Irish Guards to troop their colour. All five regiments on parade.
2025	Sat 14 June	2nd Battalion Coldstream Guards (represented by No.7 Company)	The King	Coldstream Guards celebrate the 375th anniversary of their creation. One minute of silence held for the victims of the Air India crash. Royal family members and officers on horseback wore black armbands.
2026	Sat 13 June	1st Battalion Grenadier Guards	The King	370 years since the creation of the Grenadier Guards in 1656. All three branches of the British Armed Forces provided street liners for the first time along with the Household Division.
2027	Sat 12 June	2nd Battalion Scots Guards (represented by F Company)	The King	385 years since the first creation of the Scots Guards, then called The Marquis of Argyll's Royal Regiment, by King Charles I

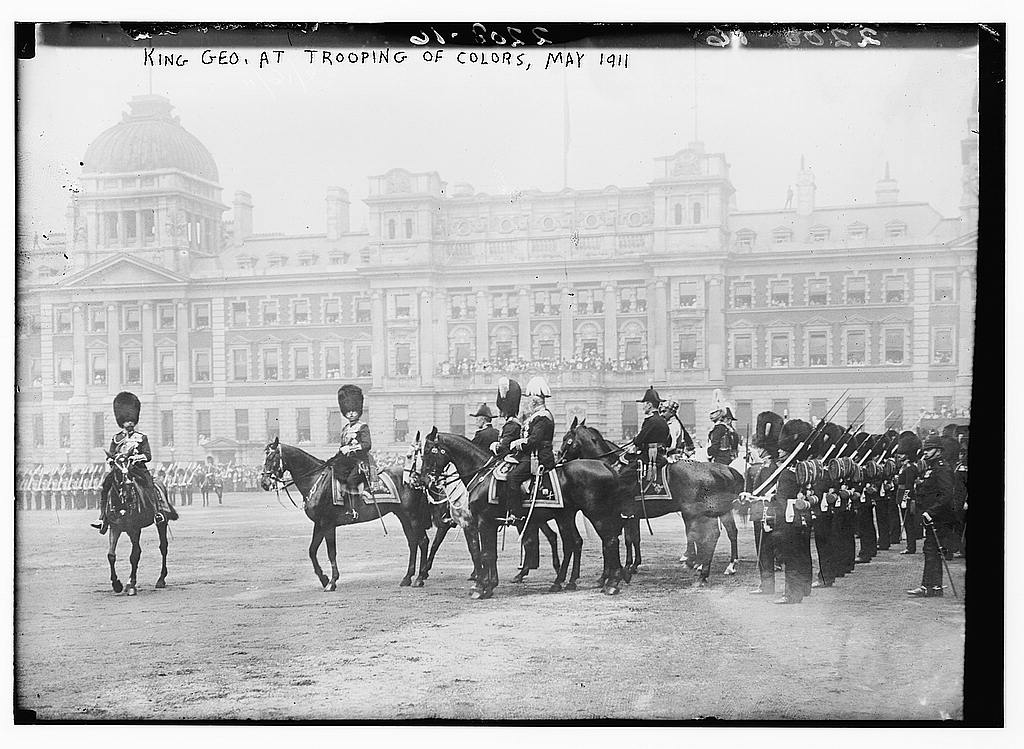
George V (on horseback, LHS) inspecting the guards during Trooping the Colour, 27 May 1911

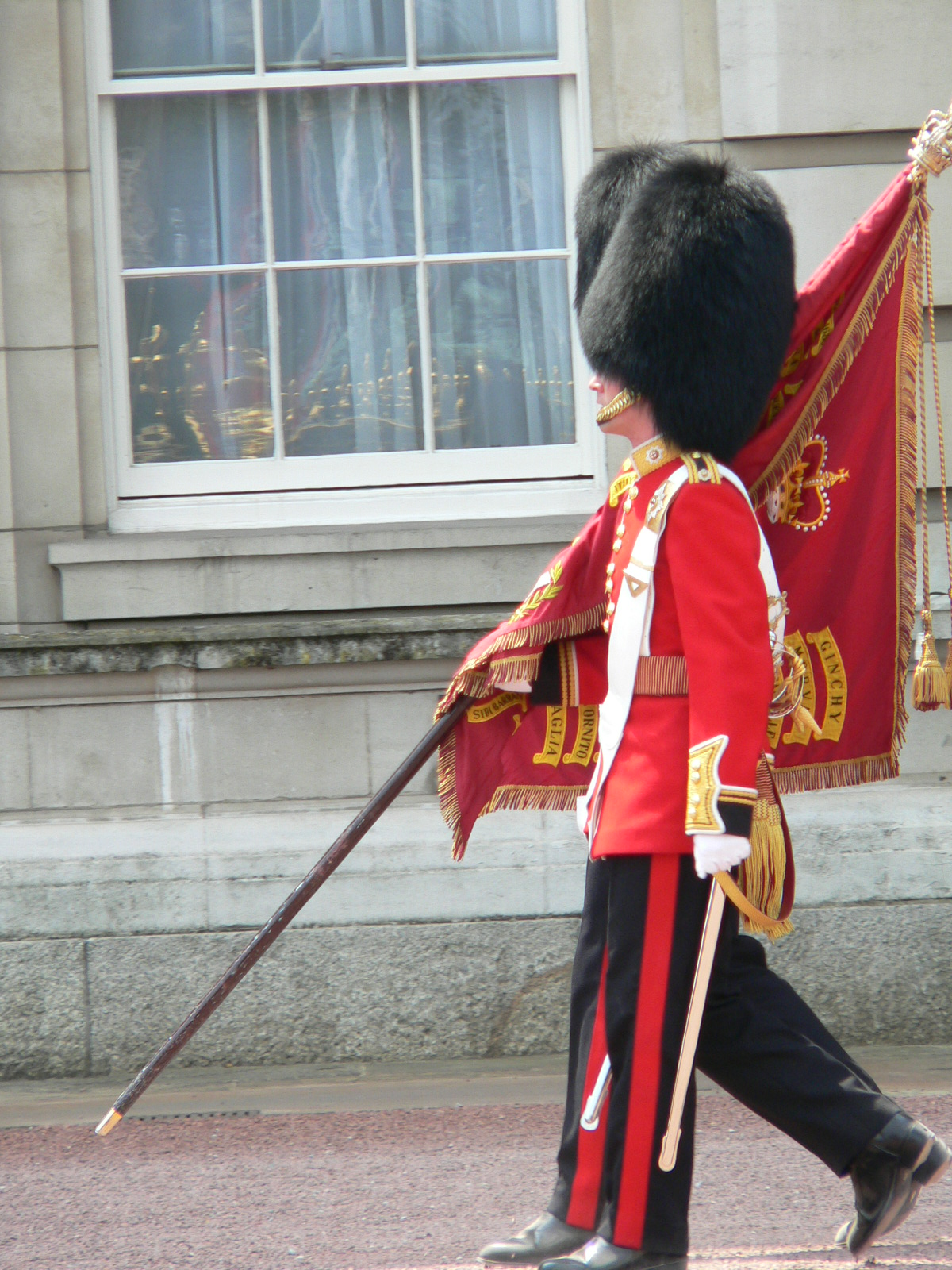
The trooped colour, 17 June 2006

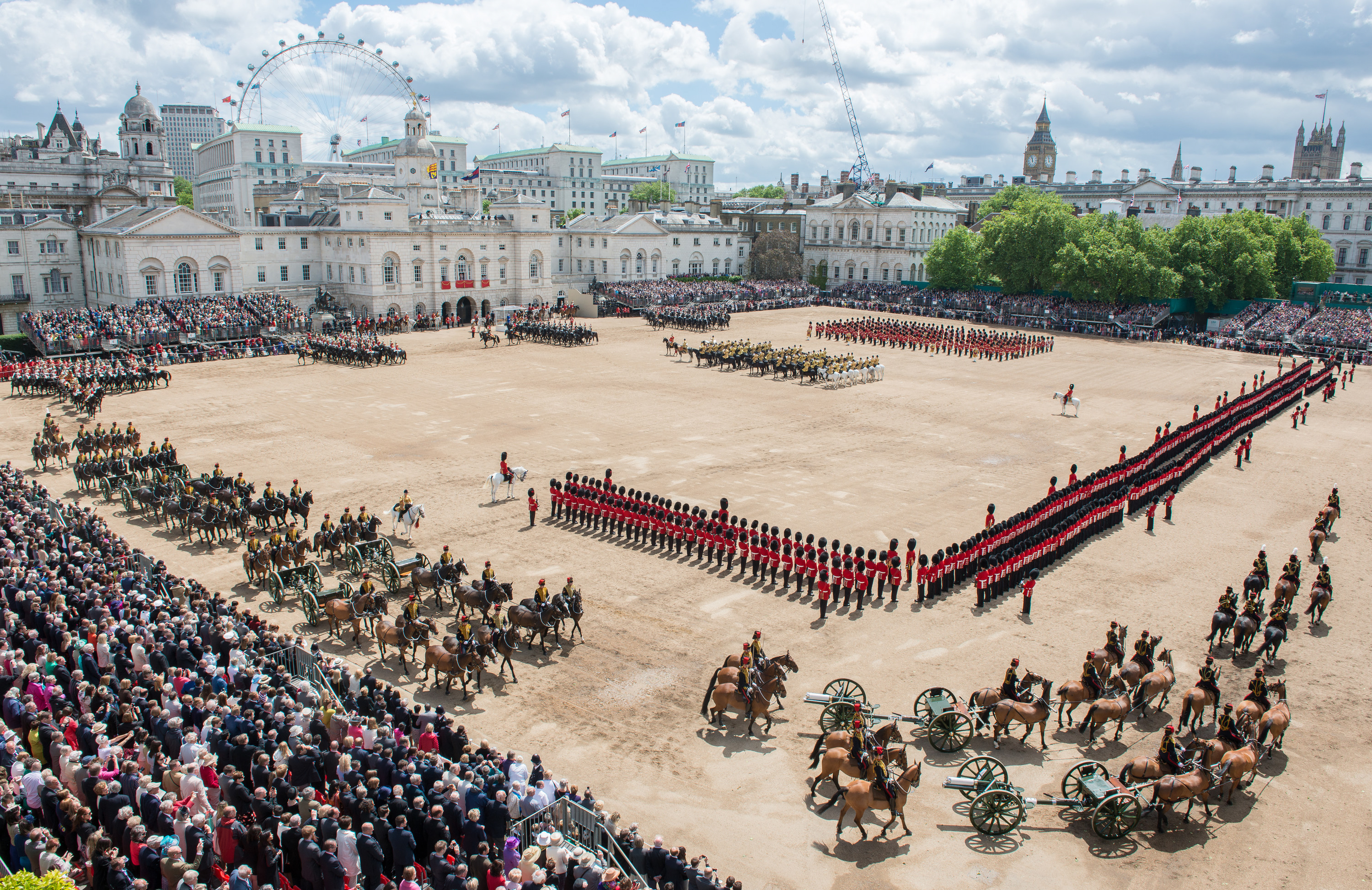
Horse Guards Parade, 15 June 2013
