= Platinum Jubilee National Service of Thanksgiving =

2022 service in St Paul's Cathedral, London

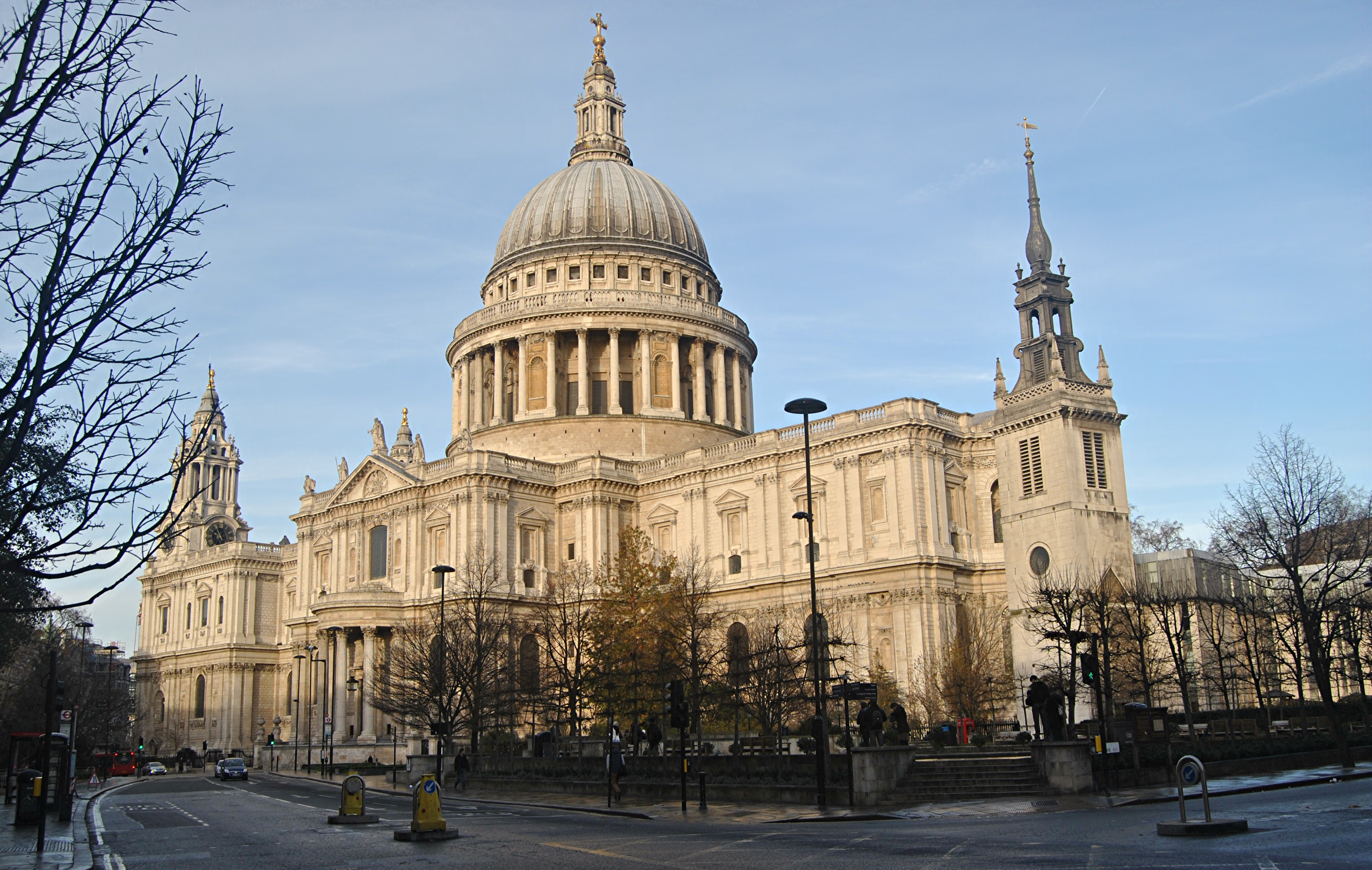
St Paul's Cathedral, London

The Platinum Jubilee National Service of Thanksgiving was held at St Paul's Cathedral in London on Friday 3 June 2022, as part of the Platinum Jubilee celebrations of Queen Elizabeth II.

== Service ==
The national service of thanksgiving included Bible readings, anthems, prayers and congregational hymns expressing thankfulness for the Queen's 70-year reign. The New Testament lesson, from the fourth chapter of St Paul's Epistle to the Philippians, was read by Boris Johnson, who, on his arrival, had been booed by the crowds.

In his sermon, the Archbishop of York, Stephen Cottrell, remarked that the Queen, a horse-lover, was "still in the saddle" after 70 years on the throne and thanked her for "staying the course". He praised her as an example of "staunch constancy and a steadfast consistency; a faithfulness to God, an obedience to a vocation that is a bedrock of her life".

The combined choir of St Paul's and the Chapel Royal was directed by Andrew Carwood, and William Fox played the organ. Other musicians were the Band of the Royal Marines, Portsmouth and the Band of the Coldstream Guards, with state trumpters of the Household Cavalry and the Central Band of the Royal Air Force. The service included a new anthem, By Wisdom, by Judith Weir, Master of the Queen's Music, with words from the third chapter of the Book of Proverbs. Other choral music was the anthem I was glad by Hubert Parry, Psalm 24 with Anglican chant by Joseph Barnby, and the Benedicite by Francis Jackson. Congregational hymns were Christ is Made the Sure Foundation, Immortal, Invisible, God Only Wise and Glorious Things of Thee Are Spoken. Before and after the service, the Cathedral Guild of Bell Ringers rang Stedman Cinques.

The service ended with a blessing given by the Bishop of London, Sarah Mullally, and the singing of the national anthem, God Save the Queen.

After the service, Great Paul, the largest church bell in the country at 16 tonnes, rang for four hours. It was the first royal occasion for which it had been rung since its restoration in 2021.

== Guests ==
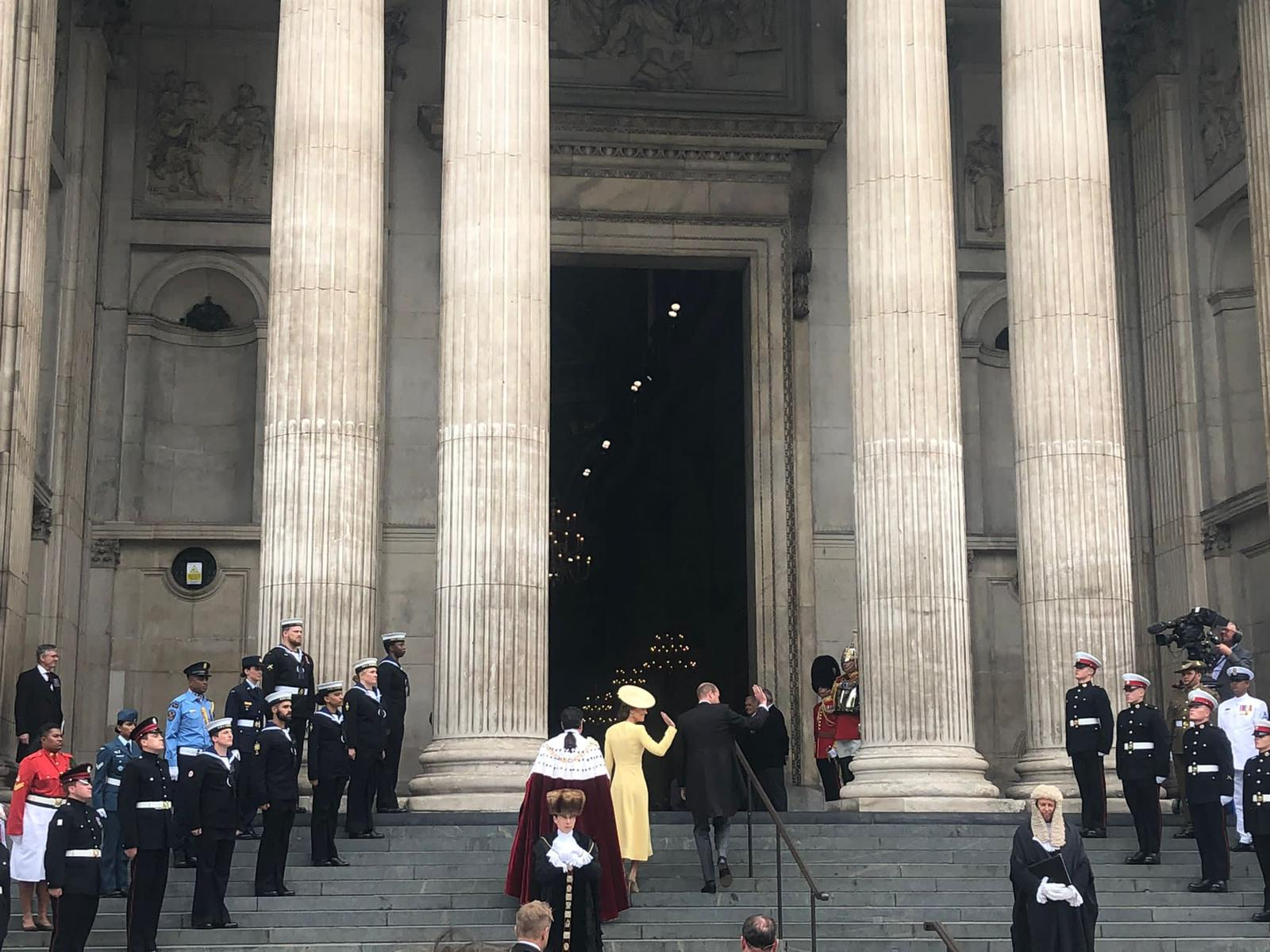
The Duke and Duchess of Cambridge arrive for the service

On 2 June, it was announced that the Queen would not be attending the service as she had experienced "some discomfort" while watching the Trooping of the Colour parade the previous day. The Archbishop of Canterbury, who had been due to officiate, and the Duke of York also did not attend as they had tested positive for COVID-19.

In addition to the members of the British royal family, senior politicians and members of the diplomatic corps listed below, the 2,000-strong congregation included 400 health workers, public servants and charity representatives, in recognition of their community service during the Queen's reign.

The service was notable as the first public engagement in the United Kingdom by the Duke and Duchess of Sussex since they stepped down as working royals in 2020.

The Queen watched the service on television.

=== The Royal Family ===
- The Prince of Wales and the Duchess of Cornwall, the Queen's son and daughter-in-law
  - The Duke and Duchess of Cambridge, the Queen's grandson and granddaughter-in-law
  - The Duke and Duchess of Sussex, the Queen's grandson and granddaughter-in-law
- The Princess Royal and Vice Admiral Sir Timothy Laurence, the Queen's daughter and son-in-law
  - Peter Phillips, the Queen's grandson
  - Zara and Michael Tindall, the Queen's granddaughter and grandson-in-law
- The Duke of York's family:
  - Princess Beatrice and Edoardo Mapelli Mozzi, the Queen's granddaughter and grandson-in-law
  - Princess Eugenie and Jack Brooksbank, the Queen's granddaughter and grandson-in-law
- The Earl and Countess of Wessex and Forfar, the Queen's son and daughter-in-law
  - Lady Louise Mountbatten-Windsor, the Queen's granddaughter
  - Viscount Severn, the Queen's grandson
- The Princess Margaret, Countess of Snowdon's family:
  - The Earl of Snowdon, the Queen's nephew
    - Viscount Linley, the Queen's great-nephew
  - Lady Sarah and Daniel Chatto, the Queen's niece and her husband
    - Samuel Chatto, the Queen's great-nephew
    - Arthur Chatto, the Queen's great-nephew

Other descendants of the Queen's paternal grandfather King George V and their families:

- The Duke and Duchess of Gloucester, the Queen's first cousin and his wife
  - Earl of Ulster, the Queen's first cousin once removed
  - Lady Davina Windsor, the Queen's first cousin once removed
  - Lady Rose and George Gilman, the Queen's first cousin once removed and her husband
- The Duke of Kent, the Queen's first cousin
  - Earl and Countess of St Andrews, the Queen's first cousin once removed and his wife
  - Lady Helen and Timothy Taylor, the Queen's first cousin once removed and her husband
  - Lord Nicholas Windsor, the Queen's first cousin once removed
- Princess Alexandra, The Hon. Lady Ogilvy, the Queen's first cousin
  - James and Julia Ogilvy, the Queen's first cousin once removed and his wife
- Prince and Princess Michael of Kent, the Queen's first cousin and his wife
  - Lord and Lady Frederick Windsor, the Queen's first cousin once removed and his wife
  - Lady Gabriella and Thomas Kingston, the Queen's first cousin once removed and her husband

=== Politicians and vice-regal representatives ===
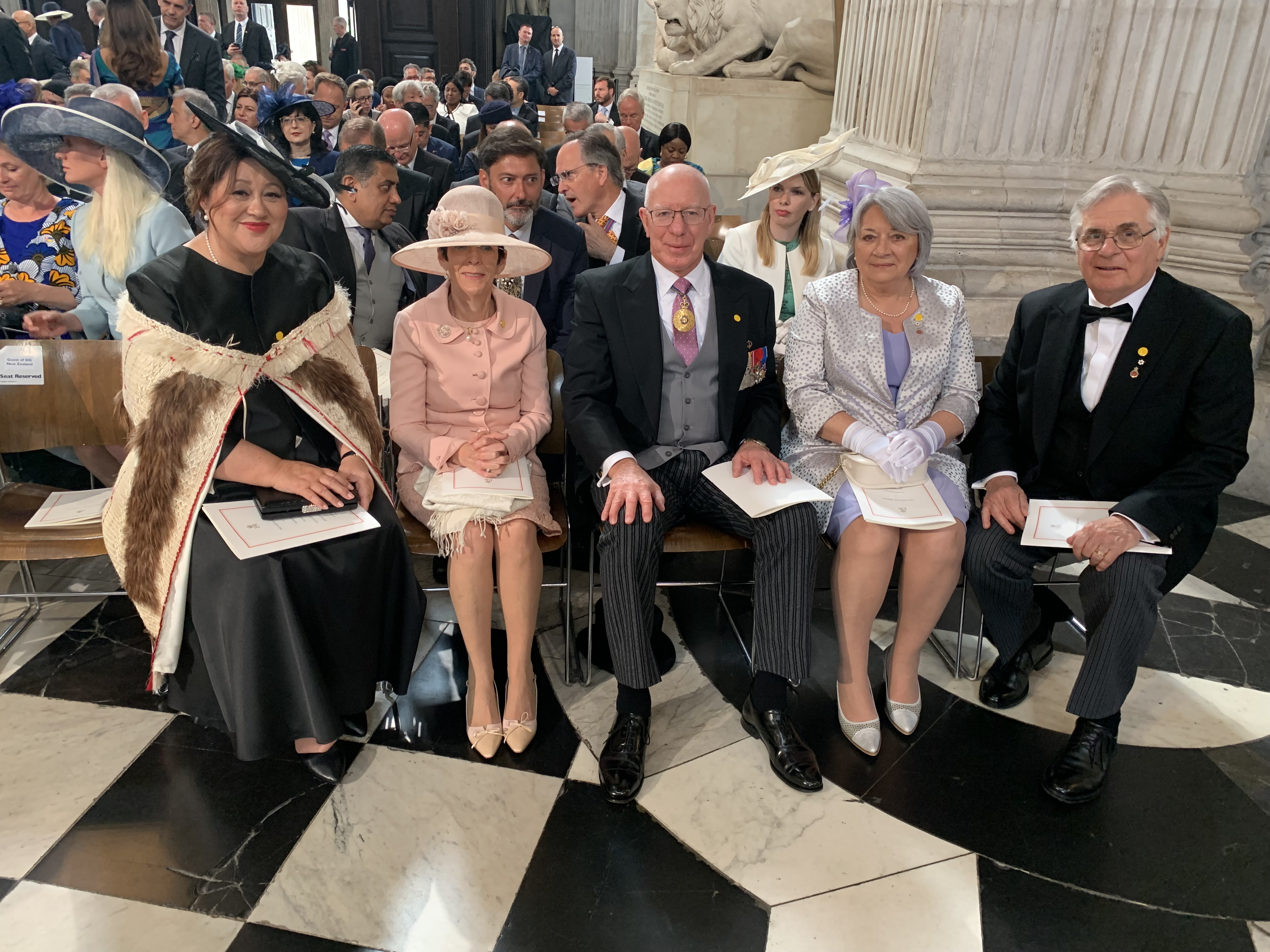
Governors-General Dame Cindy Kiro, General David Hurley, and Mary Simon inside the Cathedral

- Boris Johnson, Prime Minister of the United Kingdom, and his wife Carrie Johnson
- Priti Patel, Home Secretary
- Liz Truss, Foreign Secretary
- Ben Wallace, Defence Secretary
- Sajid Javid, Secretary of State for Health and Social Care
- Alok Sharma, Minister for the Cabinet Office and President for COP26
- Stephen Barclay, Chancellor of the Duchy of Lancaster
- Nicola Sturgeon, First Minister of Scotland, and her husband Peter Murrell, Chief Executive Officer of the Scottish National Party
- Sir Keir Starmer, Leader of the Opposition
- Sir Ed Davey, Leader of the Liberal Democrats
- Lord Newby, Leader of the Liberal Democrats in the House of Lords
- Theresa May, former Prime Minister of the United Kingdom, and her husband Sir Philip May
- David Cameron, former Prime Minister of the United Kingdom, and his wife Samantha Cameron
- Gordon Brown, former Prime Minister of the United Kingdom, and his wife Sarah Brown
- Sir Tony Blair, former Prime Minister of the United Kingdom, and his wife Cherie, Lady Blair
- Sir John Major, former Prime Minister of the United Kingdom, and his wife and Dame Norma Major
- Sir Lindsay Hoyle, Speaker of the House of Commons
- Lady Evans of Bowes Park, Leader of the House of Lords
- Vincent Keaveny, Lord Mayor of London, and his wife Amanda Keaveny
- Sadiq Khan, Mayor of London, and his wife Saadiya Khan
- Oliver Dowden, Chairman of the Conservative Party
- Jacob Rees-Mogg, Minister of State for Brexit Opportunities and Government Efficiency
- Admiral Sir Tony Radakin, Chief of the Defence Staff
- Alister Jack, Secretary of State for Scotland
- Mary Simon, Governor General of Canada, and her husband Whit Fraser
- David Hurley, Governor-General of Australia and his wife Linda Hurley
- Dame Cindy Kiro, Governor-General of New Zealand, and her husband Richard Davies
- Sir Bob Dadae, Governor-General of Papua New Guinea, and his wife Lady Emeline Dadae
- Dame Cécile La Grenade, Governor-General of Grenada
- Dame Froyla Tzalam, Governor-General of Belize and her husband Daniel Mendez
- Errol Charles, Acting Governor-General of Saint Lucia, and his wife Anysia Samuel
- Sir Rodney Williams, Governor-General of Antigua and Barbuda, and his wife Lady Williams
- Sir Patrick Allen, Governor-General of Jamaica, and his wife Lady Patricia Allen
- Baroness Scotland of Asthal, Secretary-General of the Commonwealth of Nations

== See also ==
- 2022 Trooping the Colour
- The Queen's Platinum Jubilee Beacons
