= 2022 Trooping the Colour =

Parade for the Queen's Official Birthday

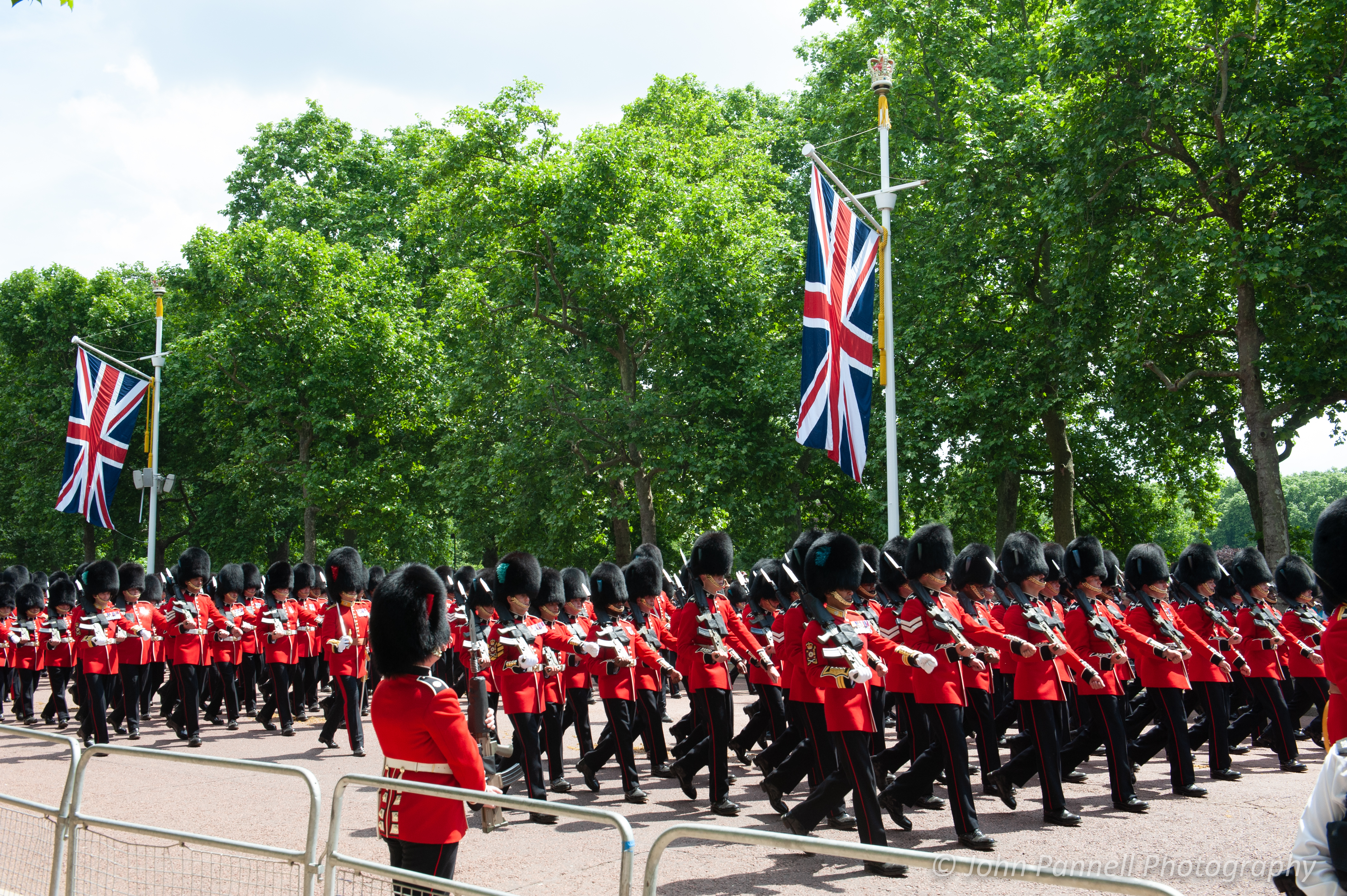
- Date: 2 June 2022; 4 years ago
- Locations: Horse Guards Parade, London, England
- Country: United Kingdom
- Previous event: 2021
- Next event: 2023
- Major events: Queen's Birthday Parade; Royal balcony appearance; Platinum Jubilee flypast

The 2022 Trooping the Colour ceremony was held on Thursday 2 June 2022, as part of the Platinum Jubilee celebrations of Queen Elizabeth II. Over 1,400 parading soldiers, 200 horses, and 400 musicians came together in the traditional parade to mark the Queen's Official Birthday, which usually takes place on the second Saturday of June. It was the final Birthday Parade to take place under the reign of Elizabeth II before her death on 8 September later that year.

== The parade ==
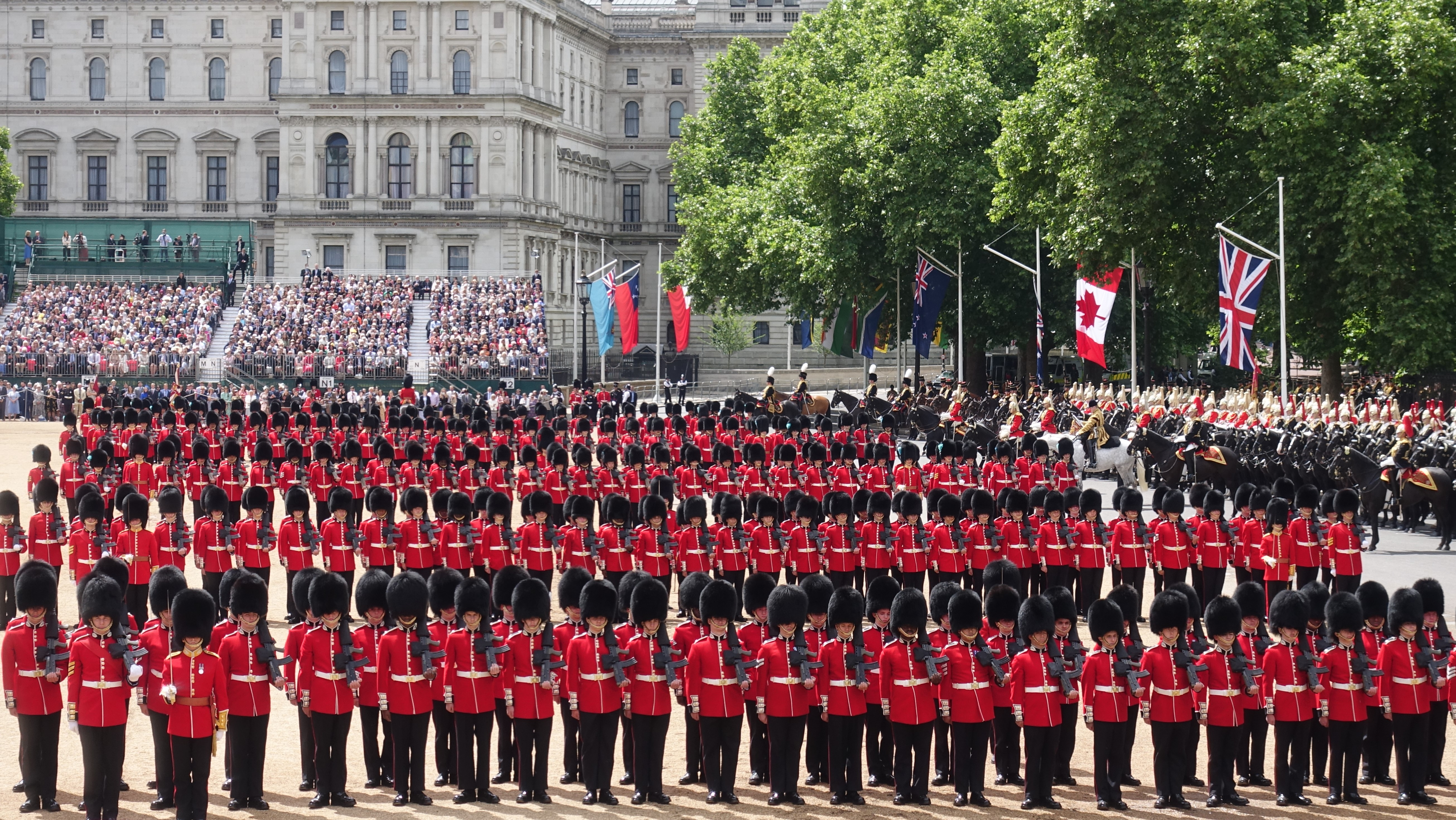
A rehearsal of Trooping the Colour took place on 28 May 2022 reviewed by the Prince William (then Duke of Cambridge)

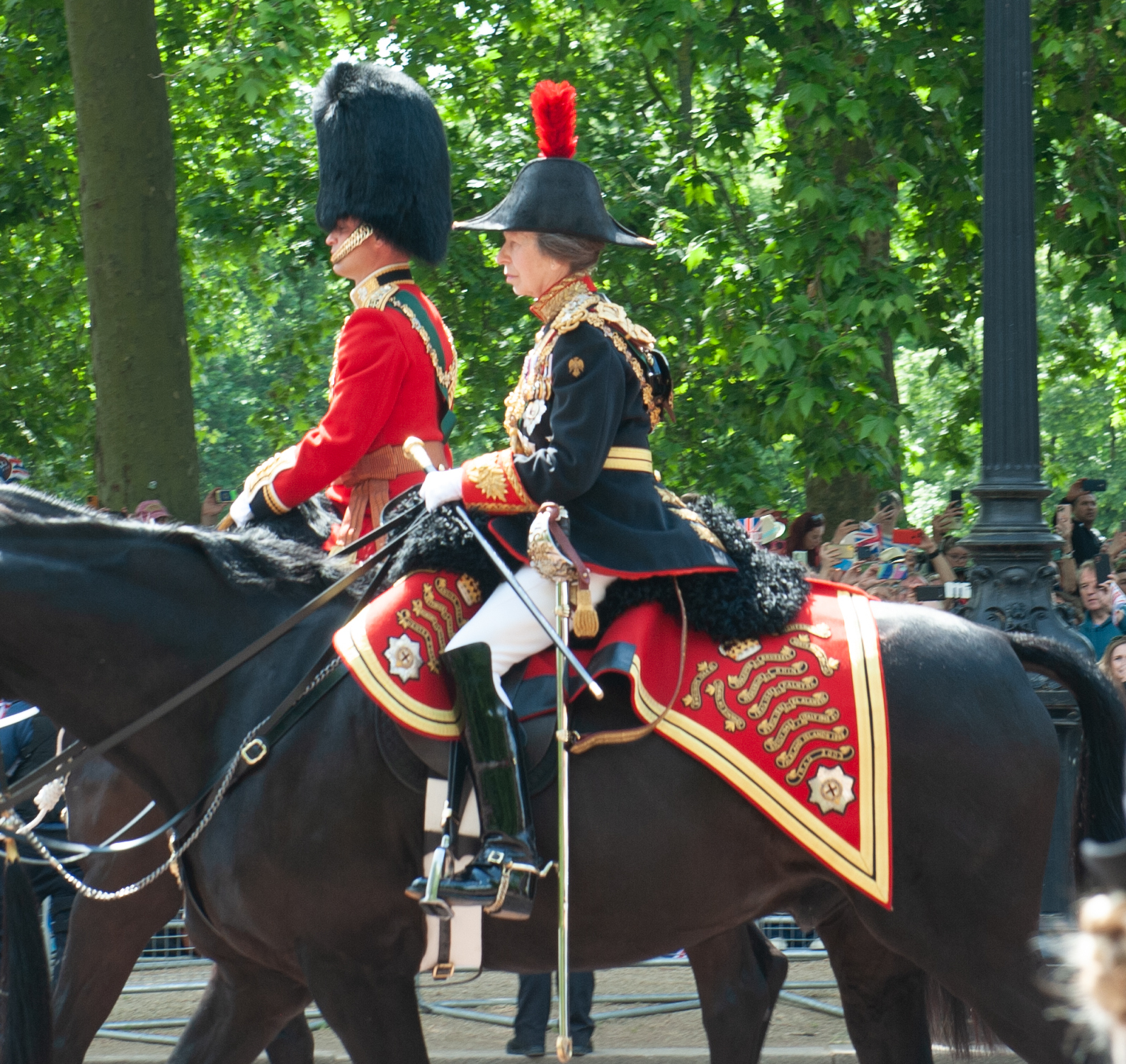
The Duke of Cambridge, Colonel of the Irish Guards, and the Princess Royal, Colonel of the Blues and Royals, riding their horses during the parade

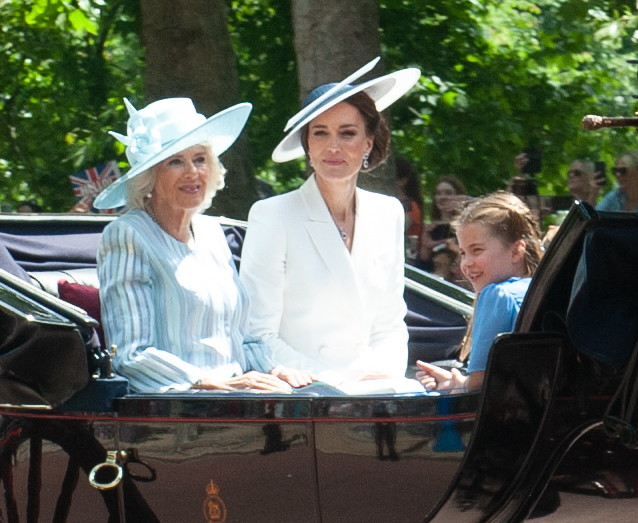
The Duchess of Cornwall, the Duchess of Cambridge, and Princess Charlotte of Cambridge taking part in the carriage procession

The parade started at 10 am British Summer Time (BST). The colour was trooped by the 1st Battalion, Irish Guards, and more than 1,200 officers and soldiers from the Household Division put on a display of military pageantry on Horse Guards Parade, together with hundreds of Army musicians and around 240 horses. The King's Troop, Royal Horse Artillery fired the 82-gun salute in London's Hyde Park. In a break with tradition, the Prince of Wales (then-Colonel of the Welsh Guards), who was joined by the Duke of Cambridge (then-Colonel of the Irish Guards) and Anne, Princess Royal (Colonel of the Blues and Royals), inspected the guards and took the salute on behalf of Elizabeth II. The Household Cavalry Mounted Regiment returned to Buckingham Palace at the end of the parade, where the Queen, accompanied by the Duke of Kent (Colonel of the Scots Guards), took the salute while standing on the balcony of the palace.

Members of the public viewed the display along The Mall as the troops paraded to and from Horse Guards Parade on its journey between Buckingham Palace and the parade ground. The public were also able to watch the ceremony on a large screen at St James's Park. 7,500 ticketed spectators were present at the Horse Guards Parade, and another 7,000 at the Victoria Memorial.

During the rehearsals at Horse Guards Parade, five people were injured after a section of the spectator stands fell apart.

== Balcony appearance ==
After the parade, the royal family's traditional balcony appearance happened as in previous years.

Buckingham Palace announced in May 2022 that "After careful consideration, the Queen has decided this year's traditional Trooping the Colour balcony appearance on Thursday 2nd June will be limited to Her Majesty and those members of the royal family who are currently undertaking official public duties on behalf of the Queen."

The following members of the royal family appeared on the balcony:

- The Queen
  - The Prince of Wales and the Duchess of Cornwall, the Queen's son and daughter-in-law
    - The Duke and Duchess of Cambridge, the Queen's grandson and granddaughter-in-law
      - Prince George of Cambridge, the Queen's great-grandson
      - Princess Charlotte of Cambridge, the Queen's great-granddaughter
      - Prince Louis of Cambridge, the Queen's great-grandson
  - The Princess Royal and Vice Admiral Sir Timothy Laurence, the Queen's daughter and son-in-law
  - The Earl and Countess of Wessex and Forfar, the Queen's son and daughter-in-law
    - Lady Louise Mountbatten-Windsor, the Queen's granddaughter
    - Viscount Severn, the Queen's grandson
- The Duke and Duchess of Gloucester, the Queen's first cousin and his wife
- The Duke of Kent, the Queen's first cousin
- Princess Alexandra, The Hon. Lady Ogilvy, the Queen's first cousin

== Platinum Jubilee Flypast ==
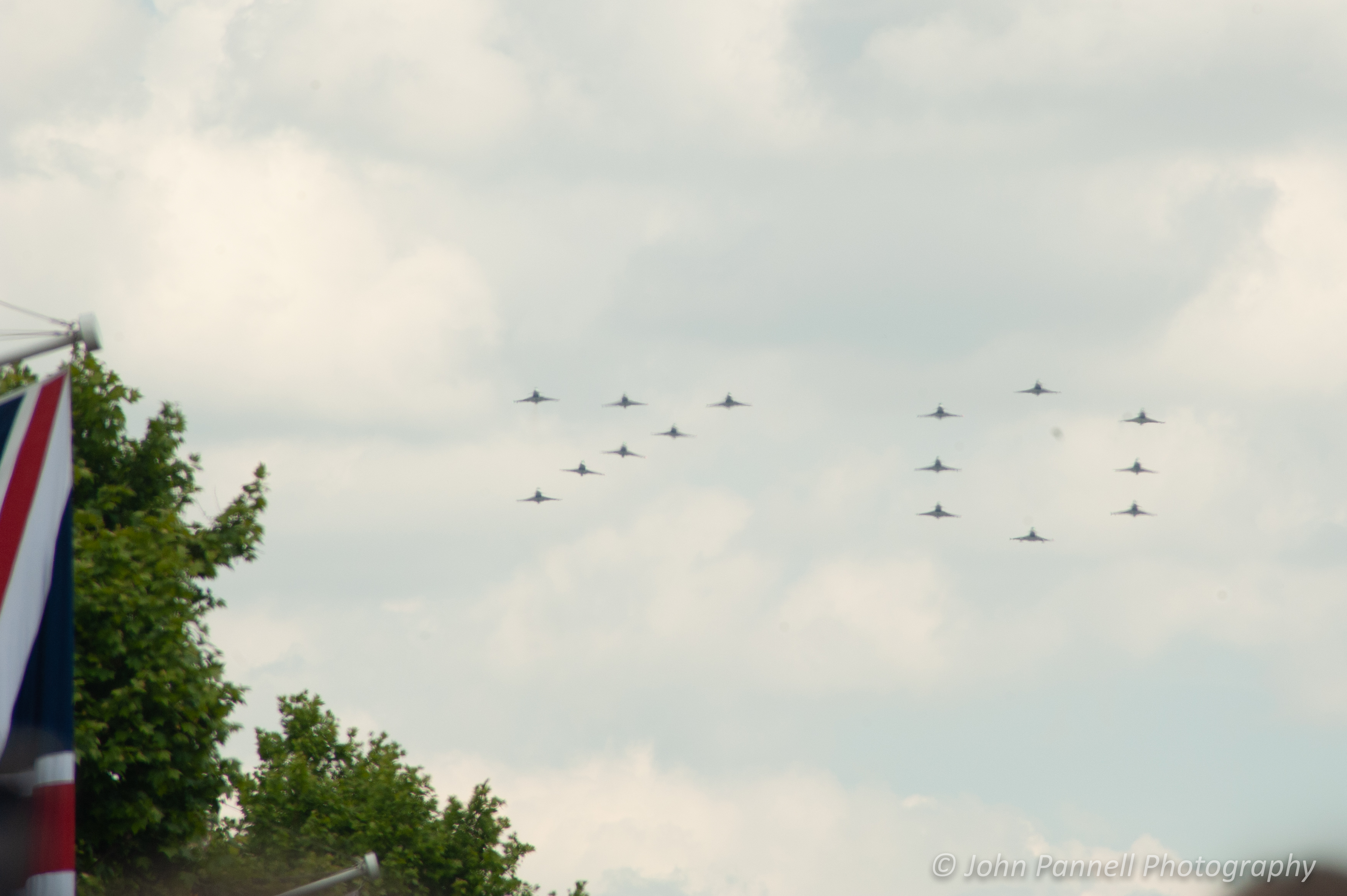
Fifteen Typhoon FGR4s forming the number 70

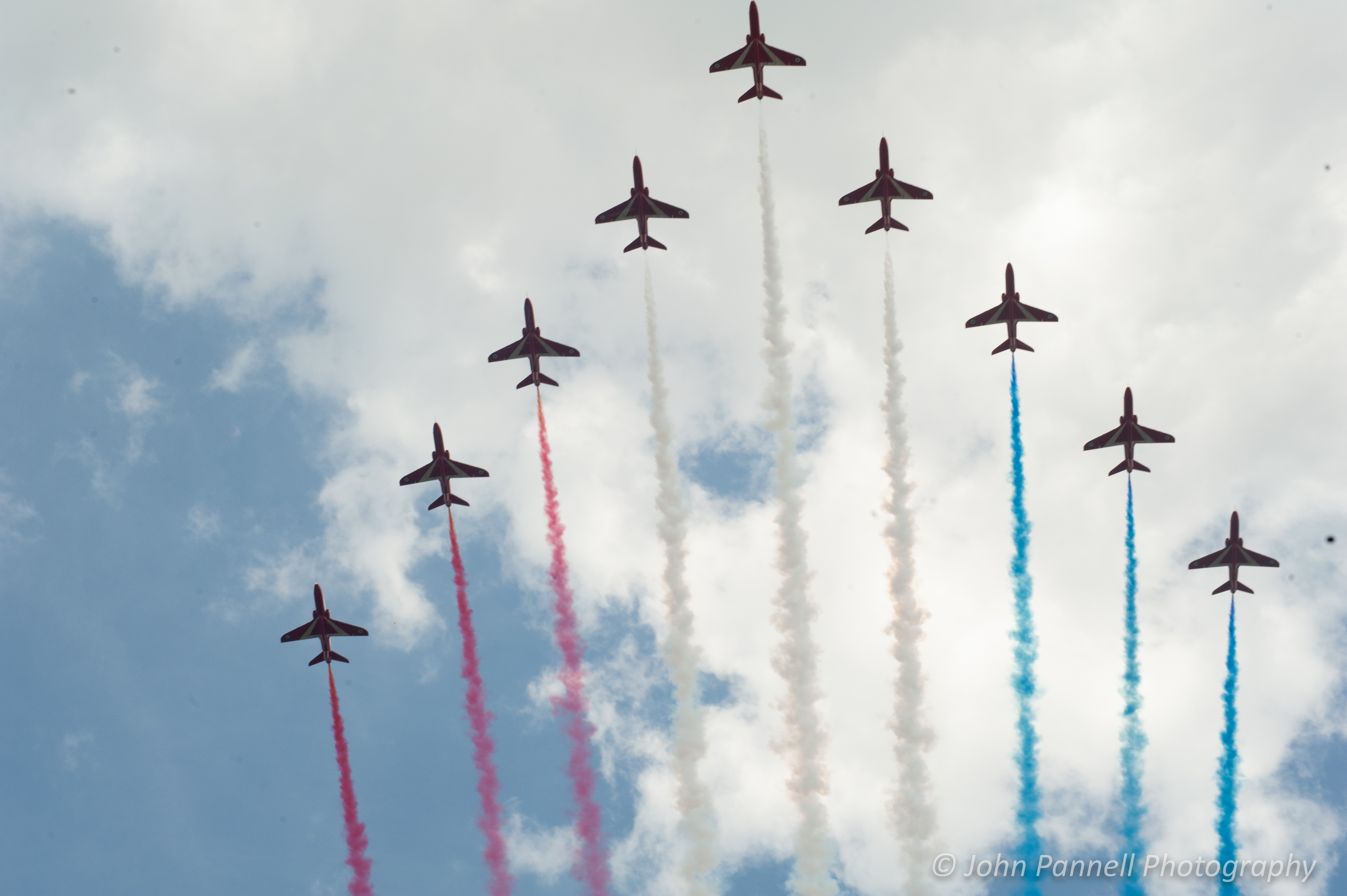
The Royal Air Force Aerobatic Team, the Red Arrows taking part in the flypast

A Platinum Jubilee Flypast took place to coincide with the Royal Family's balcony appearance. More than 70 military aeroplanes, jets, and helicopters, including the Battle of Britain Memorial Flight and the Red Arrows, as well as military helicopters that responded to Kabul and Ukraine, took part in the flypast that lasted six minutes.

The aircraft that took part in the flypast included all three services of the British Armed Forces; starting with helicopters from the Royal Navy: the Wildcat and the Merlin; the Army Air Corps of the British Army with their Apache helicopters; with the Royal Air Force providing the majority remainder contingent aircraft, including: Puma helicopters, Chinook helicopters, Lancaster, Spitfires and Hurricanes (of the BBMF), Embraer Phenom 300, Texan training aircraft, Hercules C-130J, Atlas A400M, Globemaster C-17, Poseidon P-8, Rivet Joint RC-135, Vespina, RAF VIP Voyager, Typhoon FGR4, F35B Lightning, and Hawks.

== See also ==
- The Queen's Platinum Jubilee Beacons
