= 2025 Trooping the Colour =

Parade for the King's Official Birthday

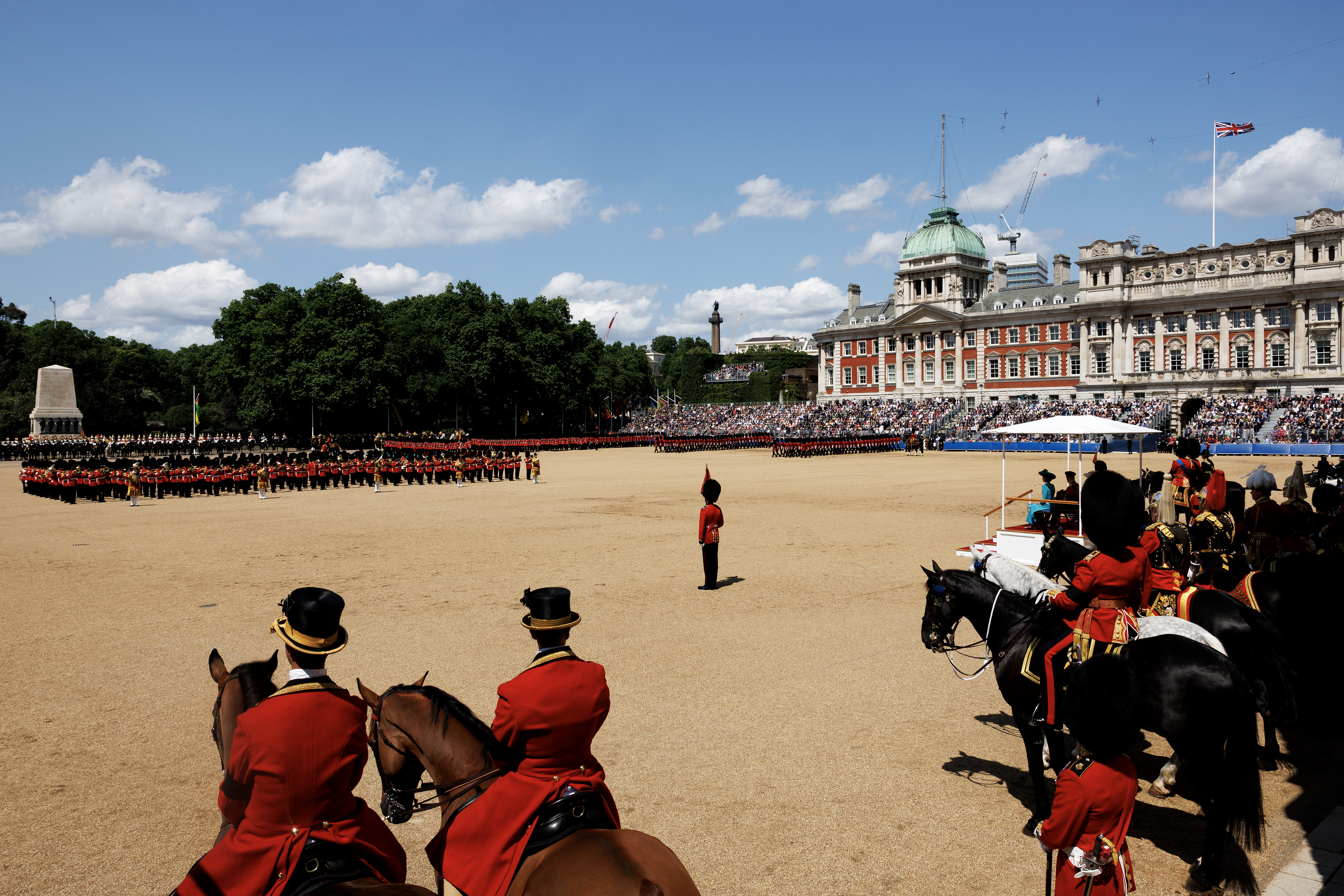
- Date: 14 June 2025; 16 months ago
- Locations: Horse Guards Parade, London, England
- Country: United Kingdom
- Previous event: 2024
- Next event: 2026
- Major events: King's Birthday Parade; Royal balcony appearance

The 2025 Trooping the Colour ceremony was held on Saturday 14 June to celebrate the official birthday of King Charles III.

== Background ==
The Trooping the Colour ceremony, also known as the King's Birthday Parade, is an annual event that takes place each June in central London to celebrate the official birthday of the reigning monarch of the United Kingdom. The ceremony is a display of military pageantry, involving more than 1,000 military personnel who would be on active service when not performing ceremonial duties, with music and a flypast of vintage and modern aircraft, as well as the traditional appearance of the Royal family on the balcony of Buckingham Palace.

== The ceremony ==
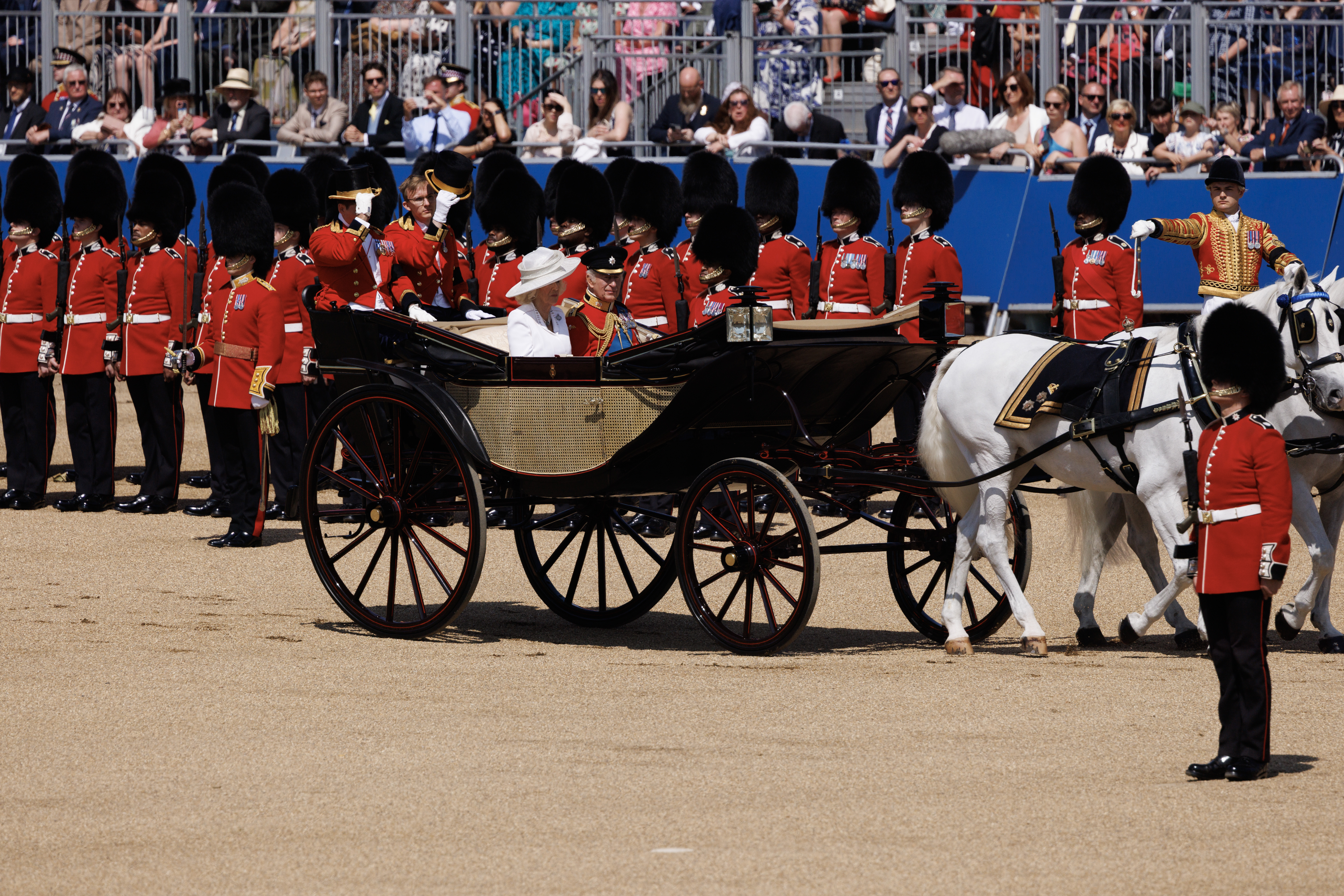
King Charles and Queen Camilla in the Ascot Landau carriage.

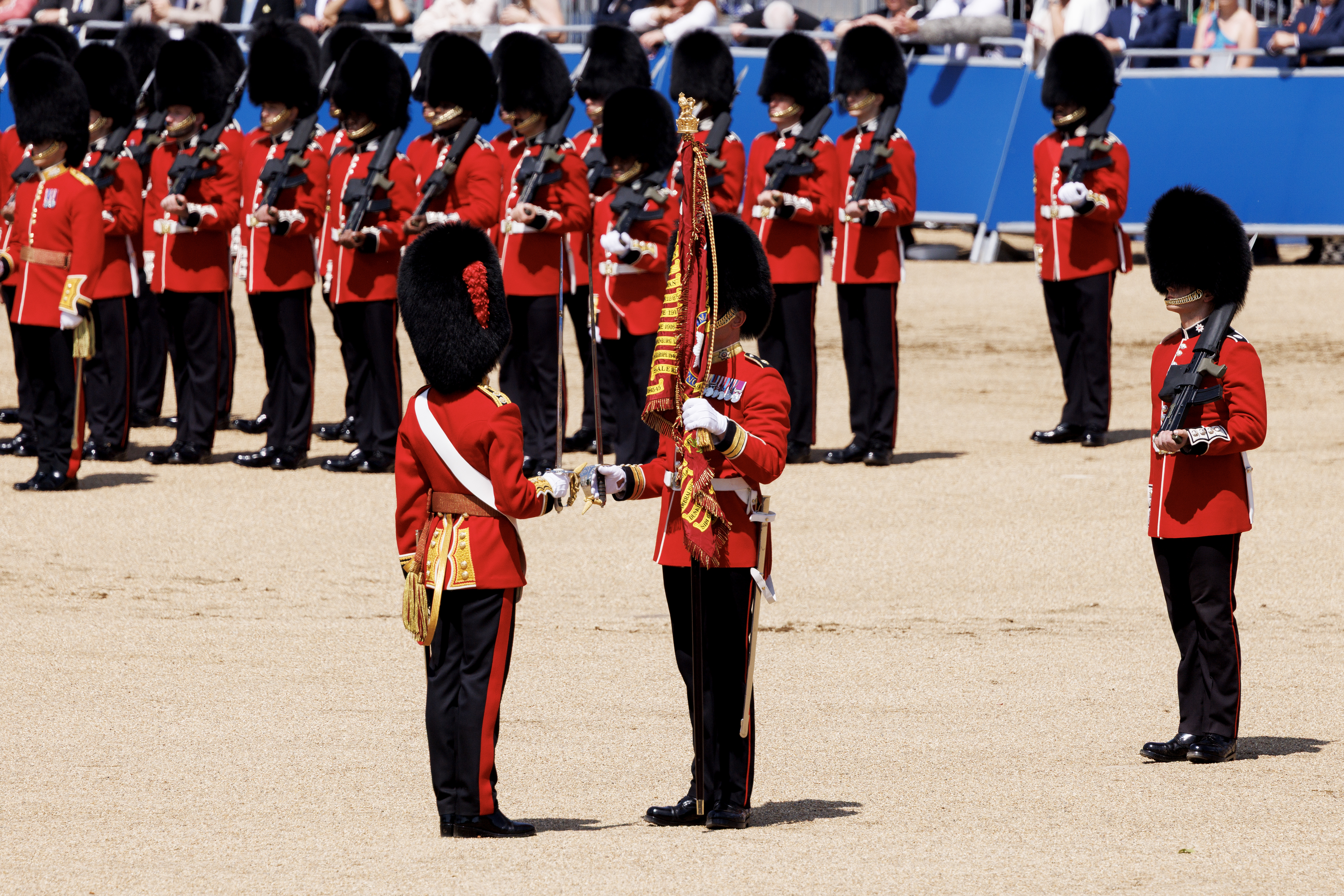
The Regimental Sergeant-Major presents the King's Colour of 2nd Battalion, Coldstream Guards to the Ensign prior to trooping through the ranks.

The 2025 ceremony was the third to be attended by Charles since his accession to the throne, and the second since his cancer diagnosis and as he continued to undergo treatment. As with the previous year's ceremony, the King rode alongside the Queen in a carriage rather than on horseback. Behind were the royal colonels: the Prince of Wales, Colonel of the Welsh Guards; the Princess Royal, Colonel of the Blues and Royals; and the Duke of Edinburgh, Colonel of the Scots Guards. They were followed by carriages carrying the Princess of Wales and her children, the Duchess of Edinburgh, Vice Admiral Sir Tim Laurence, and the Duke and Duchess of Gloucester. The Royal Procession was accompanied by the Sovereign's Escort of the Household Cavalry Mounted Regiment and the Band of The Household Cavalry, and led by two drum horses carrying silver kettledrums. The colour being trooped in 2025 was the King's Colour of 2nd Battalion, Coldstream Guards. (Note: The 2nd Battalion was represented by No. 7 Company, Coldstream Guards – one of five incremental companies employed to undertake public duties that maintain the colours and traditions of the foot guards battalions in suspended animation.) The Coldstream Guards was celebrating its 375th anniversary that year, with the regiment receiving new colours from the King the day prior to the parade.

The procession rode along The Mall to Horse Guards Parade, where the King inspected the troops. He was joined on the dais by the Queen, and the Princess of Wales, who holds the symbolic title of Colonel of the Irish Guards, and took part in the ceremony after being unable to do so in 2024 as she was undergoing cancer treatment. Following the ceremony, the Royal family appeared on the balcony of Buckingham Palace for the traditional Royal Air Force flypast of twenty-nine aircraft from nine RAF bases. It was led by four Chinook helicopters, followed by the Avro Lancaster of the Battle of Britain Memorial Flight. Other aircraft included a Embraer Phenom, Eurofighter Typhoons, a Lockheed Martin F-35 and a C17 Globemaster, representing the various functions of the force. The final part of the formation was the Royal Air Force Aerobatic Team, the Red Arrows; this marked the first year that the Red Arrows used environmentally friendly aviation fuel, as well as biofuel to make their trademark vapour trails of red, white and blue. The balcony appearance ended with a rendition of the National Anthem, and three cheers for the King from members of the public gathered outside.

The event saw 1,350 troops taking part, while around 8,000 public figures, veterans, members of the public and family members of the guards and officers taking part watched from stands at Horse Guards Parade. Additionally, thousands of members of the public cheered and watched the Royal procession to Horse Guards and outside of Buckingham Palace. There was also a group of Anti-monarchists present in the crowds, who chanted and waved yellow flags bearing the phrase "Not My King".

The ceremony was broadcast on television, with coverage shown on BBC One and BBC iPlayer and commentary provided by Clare Balding.

== Tribute to the Air India crash victims ==
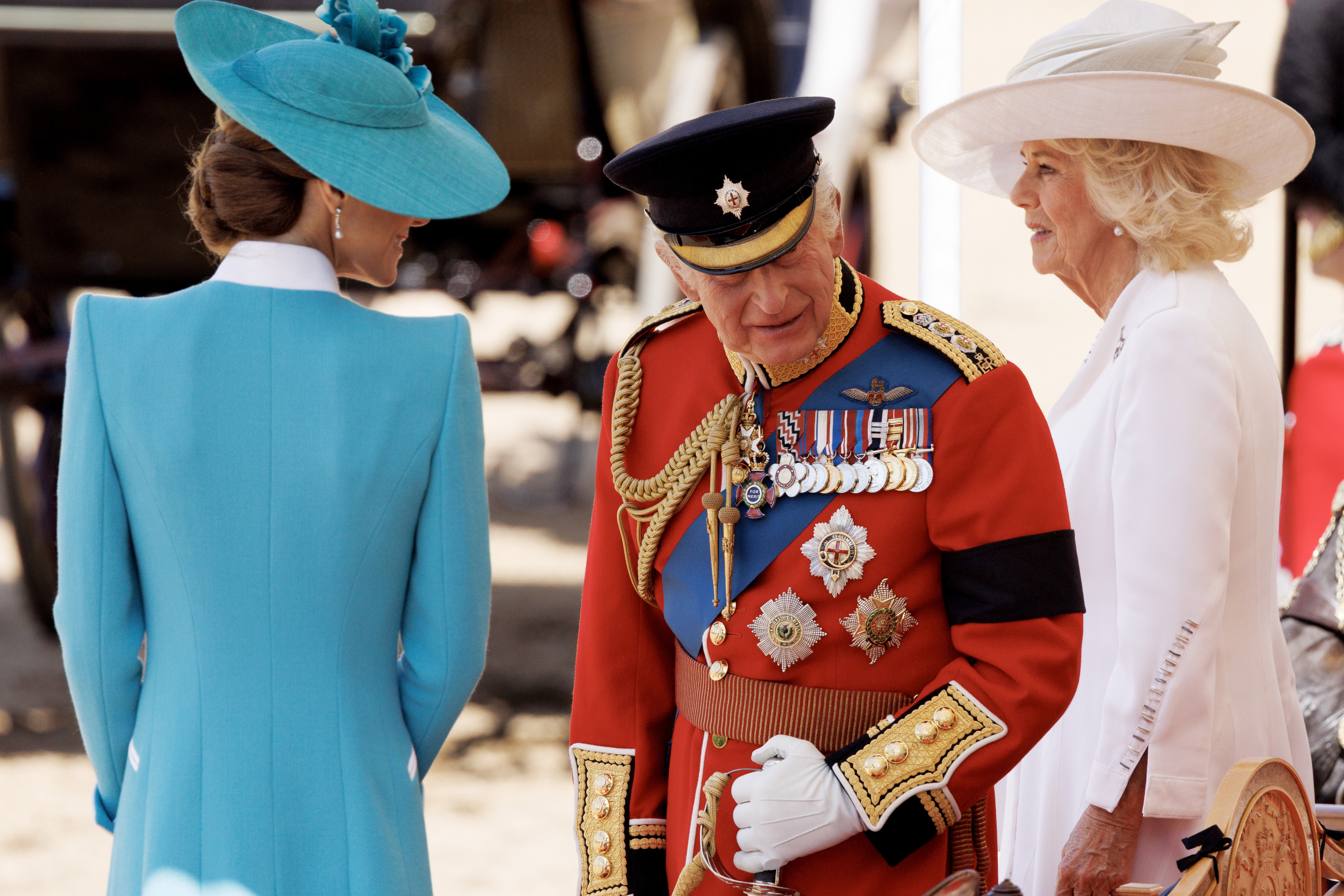
King Charles wearing a black armband in remembrance of the Air India victims.

The ceremony occurred two days after the Air India Flight 171 crash in Ahmedabad, which had resulted in the death of 241 people on board, including 53 British nationals, as well as a number of people from other Commonwealth nations. At the King's request, members of the Royal family taking part in the parade in uniform wore black armbands, to signify mourning, as did senior military officers and coachmen and women from the Royal Mews. A minute's silence was also observed at the ceremony for those involved in the crash, occurring after the King had inspected the parade, and was signalled by the Last Post and Reveille.

It was the first time alterations had been made to the ceremony since 2017, when Elizabeth II had requested a minute's silence at that year's Trooping the Colour, which took place three days after the Grenfell Tower fire.

== Balcony appearance ==
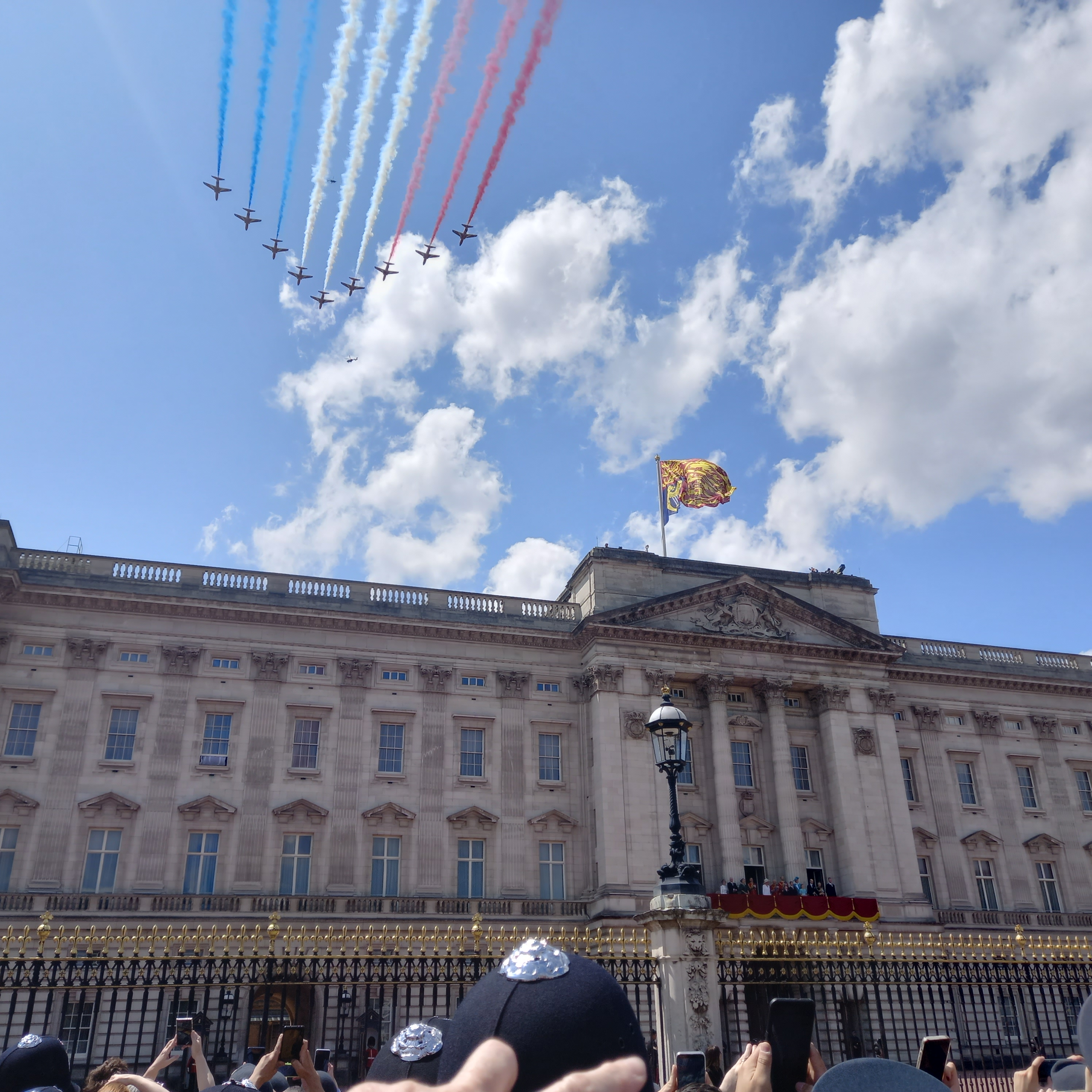
The Red Arrows display team forming part of the RAF flypast, with the royal family watching from the balcony of Buckingham Palace.

- The King and Queen
  - The Prince and Princess of Wales, the King's son and daughter-in-law
    - Prince George of Wales, the King's grandson
    - Princess Charlotte of Wales, the King's granddaughter
    - Prince Louis of Wales, the King's grandson
- The Princess Royal and Vice Admiral Sir Timothy Laurence, the King's sister and brother-in-law
- The Duke and Duchess of Edinburgh, the King's brother and sister-in-law

Other descendants of the King's maternal great-grandfather King George V and their families:

- The Duke and Duchess of Gloucester, the King's maternal first cousin once removed and his wife
- The Duke of Kent, the King's maternal first cousin once removed
