= 2023 Trooping the Colour =

Parade for the King's Official Birthday

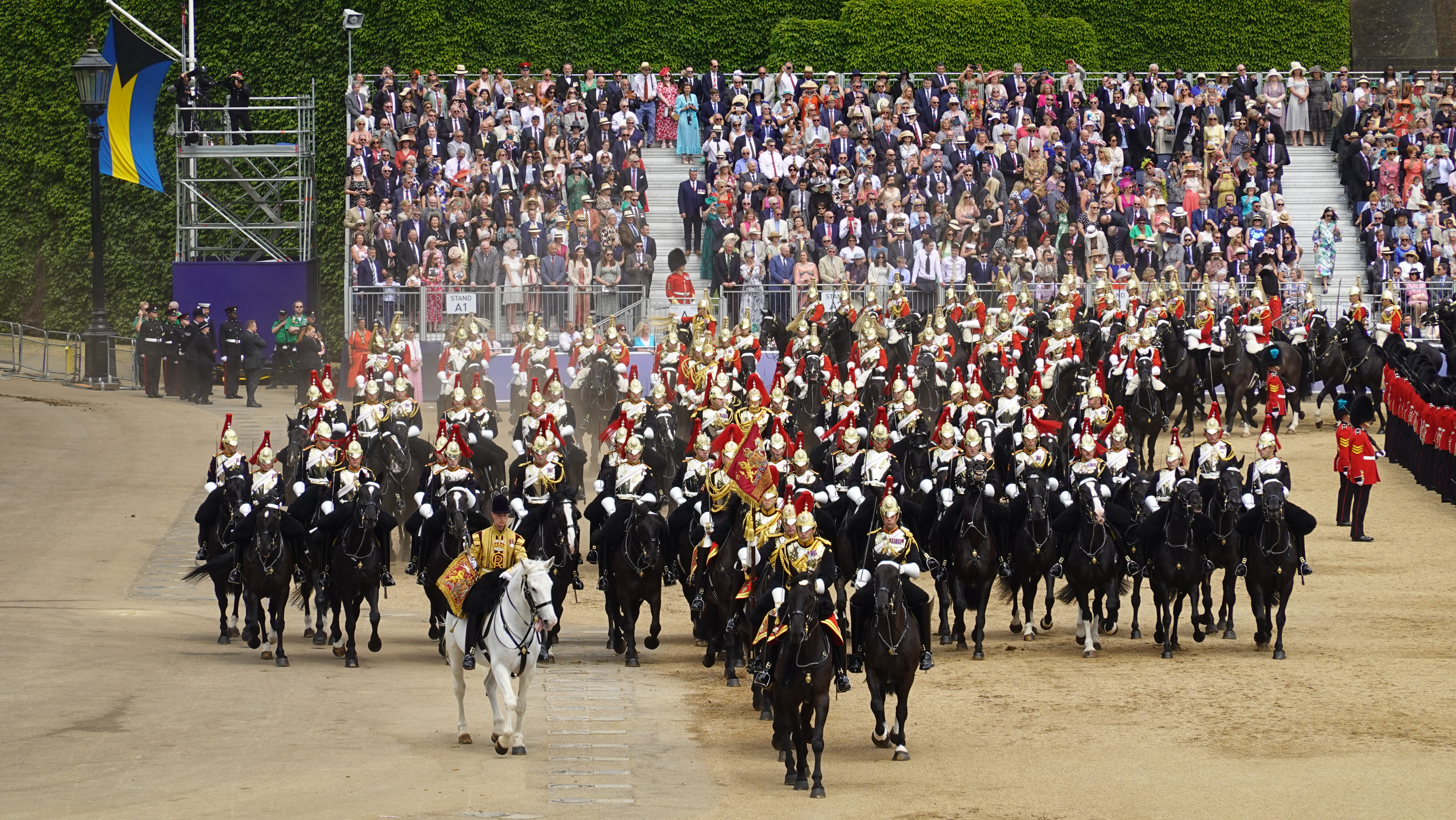
- Date: 17 June 2023; 3 years ago
- Locations: Horse Guards Parade, London, England
- Country: United Kingdom
- Previous event: 2022
- Next event: 2024
- Major events: King's Birthday Parade; Royal balcony appearance

The 2023 Trooping the Colour was held on 17 June 2023. Over 1,500 soldiers, 300 horses, and 400 musicians took part in the ceremony, the first to be held during King Charles III's reign, and for his first Official Birthday.

== The parade ==
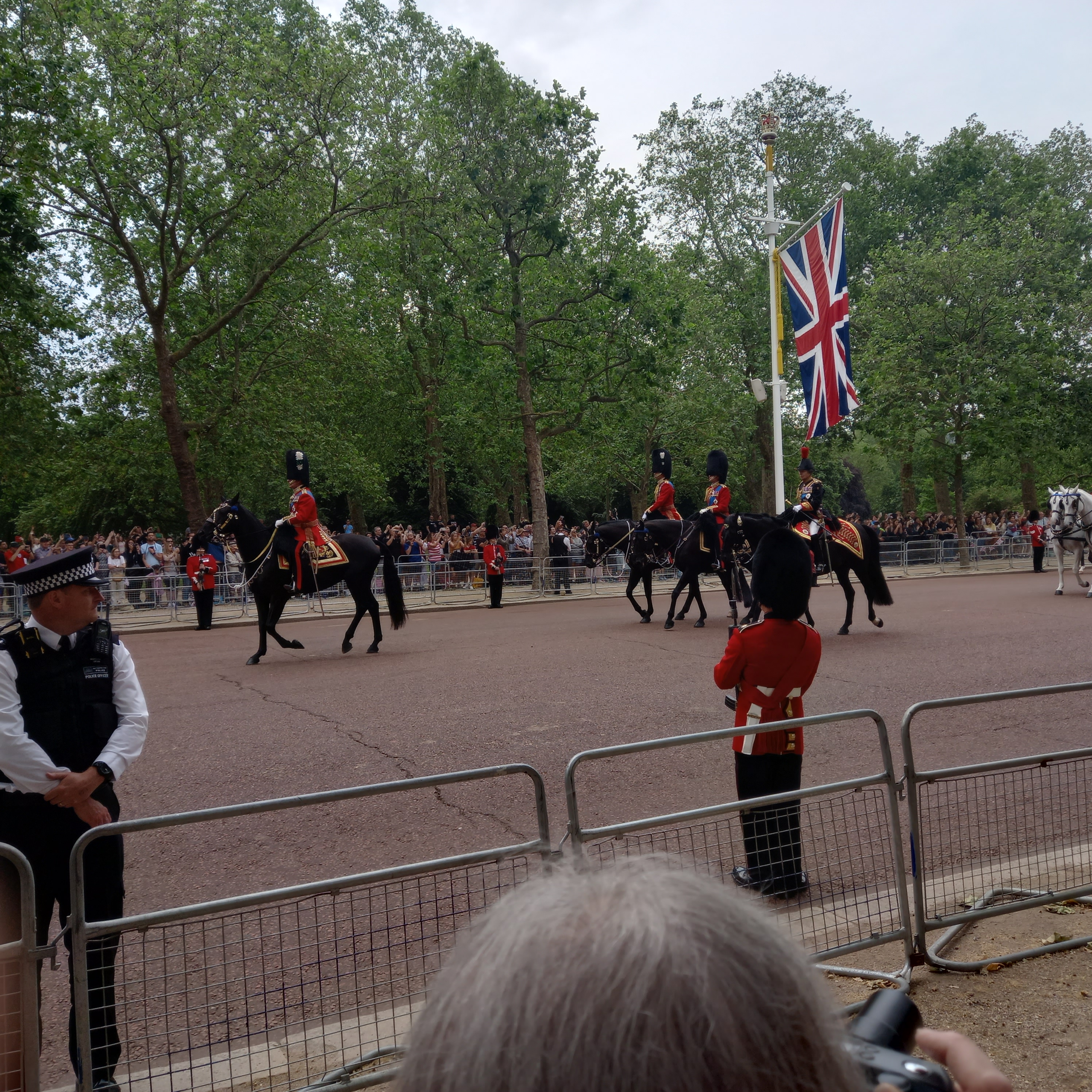
King Charles III on horseback (left), followed by William, Prince of Wales, Prince Edward, Duke of Edinburgh, and Anne, Princess Royal.

The parade began at 11 am British Summer Time (BST). It was the first time since 1986 that the monarch had ridden on horseback during the ceremony. The King was accompanied on horseback by William, Prince of Wales, Prince Edward, Duke of Edinburgh, and Anne, Princess Royal. Senior members of the royal family, including Queen Camilla, Catherine, Princess of Wales, and Sophie, Duchess of Edinburgh, rode in carriages to the Horse Guards Parade. All five regiments of the Foot Guards participated in the parade, alongside the two regiments of the Household Cavalry. The colour was trooped by the Welsh Guards. The parade was the first following a shift in honorary colonelcies in the Foot Guards in December 2022. Queen Camilla replaced Prince Andrew, Duke of York as colonel of the Grenadier Guards, while Prince William became colonel of the Welsh Guards. The Princess of Wales took her husband's former role as colonel of the Irish Guards The Duke of Edinburgh rode in his capacity as colonel of the London Guards, a reserve regiment formed in May 2022.

== After the parade ==
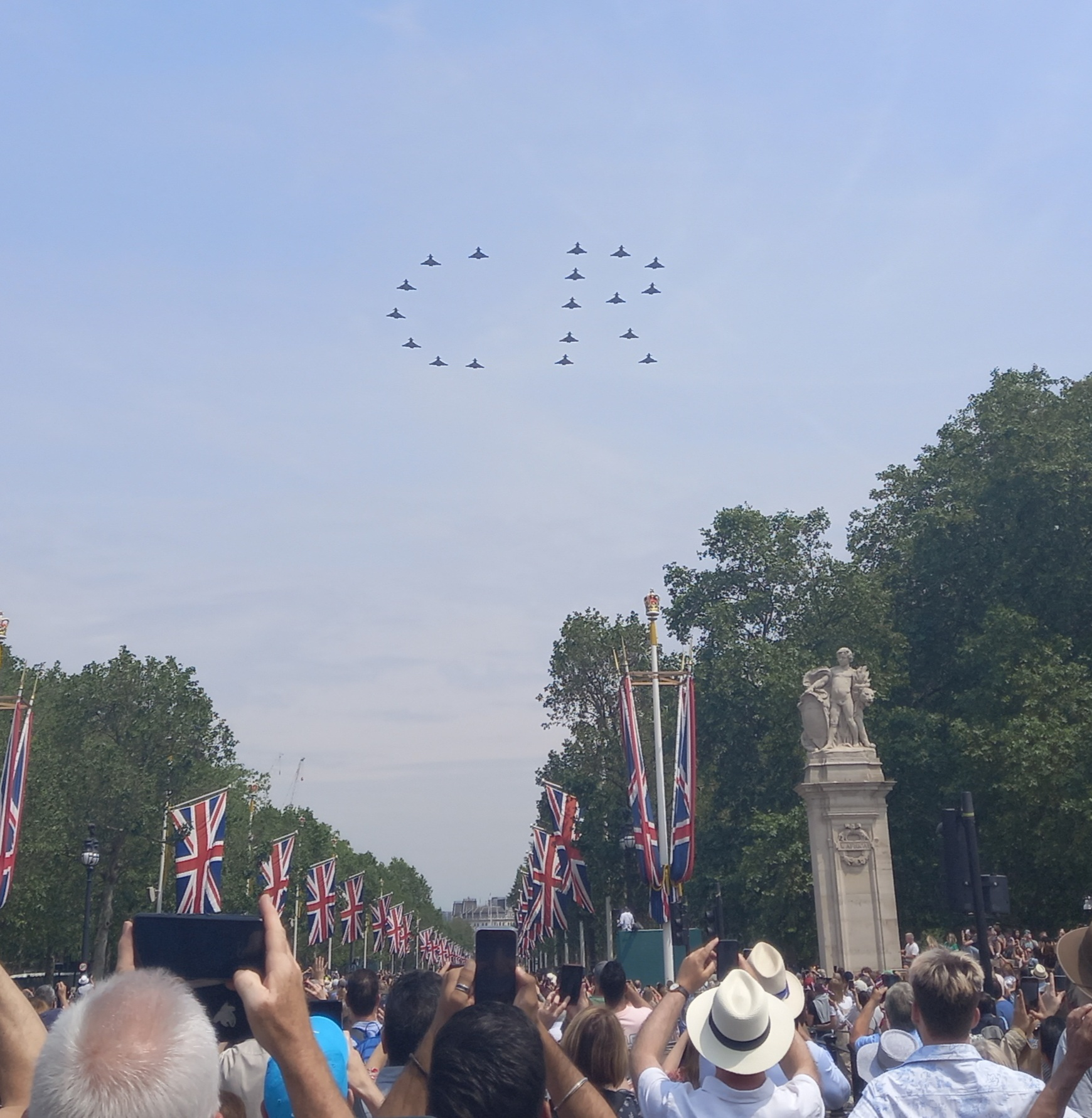
Eighteen RAF Typhoon fighters form the letters "CR" during the flypast.

Following the trooping at the Horse Guards Parade, the royal family took part in the return procession that escorted them back to Buckingham Palace. The King's Troop, Royal Horse Artillery fired a 41 gun salute from St James' Park while at the Tower of London, the Honourable Artillery Company fired 62 guns. At 1 pm, the royal family made a balcony appearance and watched a flypast; this was the event that had originally been scheduled for the coronation on 6 May, but had been curtailed by poor weather. Seventy aircraft from all three Armed Service participated. The contingrent of helicopters were followed by a Supermarine Spitfire, Hawker Hurricane and Avro Lancaster of the Battle of Britain Memorial Flight. Notable elements of the flypast included three C-130 Hercules transports on their last mission before retirement and eighteen Eurofighter Typhoons flying in a "CR" formation. The final element consisted of the newest RAF aircraft, the Dassault Envoy IV VIP transport, which was flanked by the Red Arrows display team trailing red, white and blue smoke.

== Balcony appearance ==
=== British royal family ===
- The King and Queen
  - The Prince and Princess of Wales, the King's son and daughter-in-law
    - Prince George of Wales, the King's grandson
    - Princess Charlotte of Wales, the King's granddaughter
    - Prince Louis of Wales, the King's grandson
- The Princess Royal and Vice Admiral Sir Timothy Laurence, the King's sister and brother-in-law
- The Duke and Duchess of Edinburgh, the King's brother and sister-in-law

Other descendants of the King's maternal great-grandfather King George V and their families:

- The Duke and Duchess of Gloucester, the King's maternal first cousin once removed and his wife
- The Duke of Kent, the King's maternal first cousin once removed
Trooping the Colour 2023
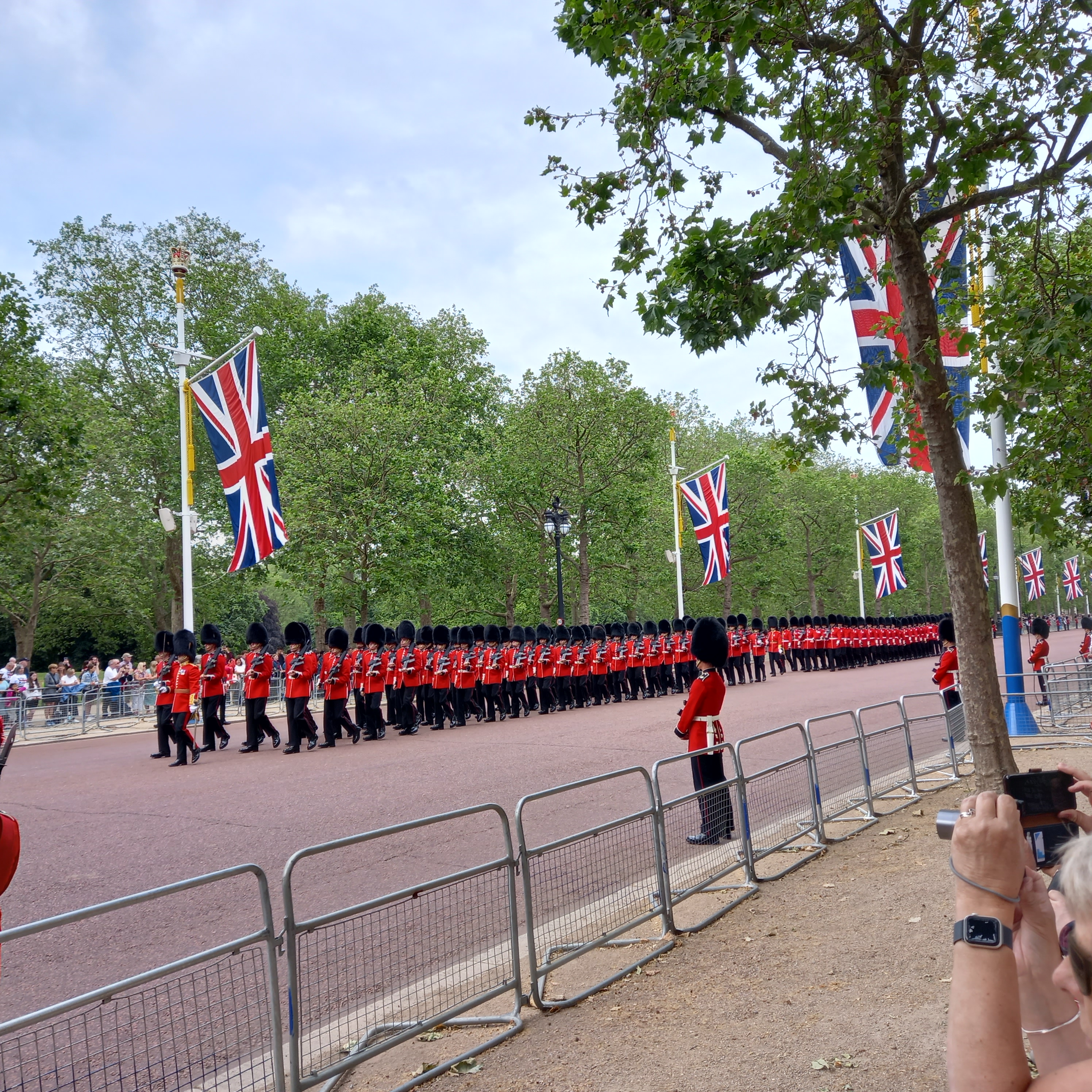
Foot Guards process along The Mall

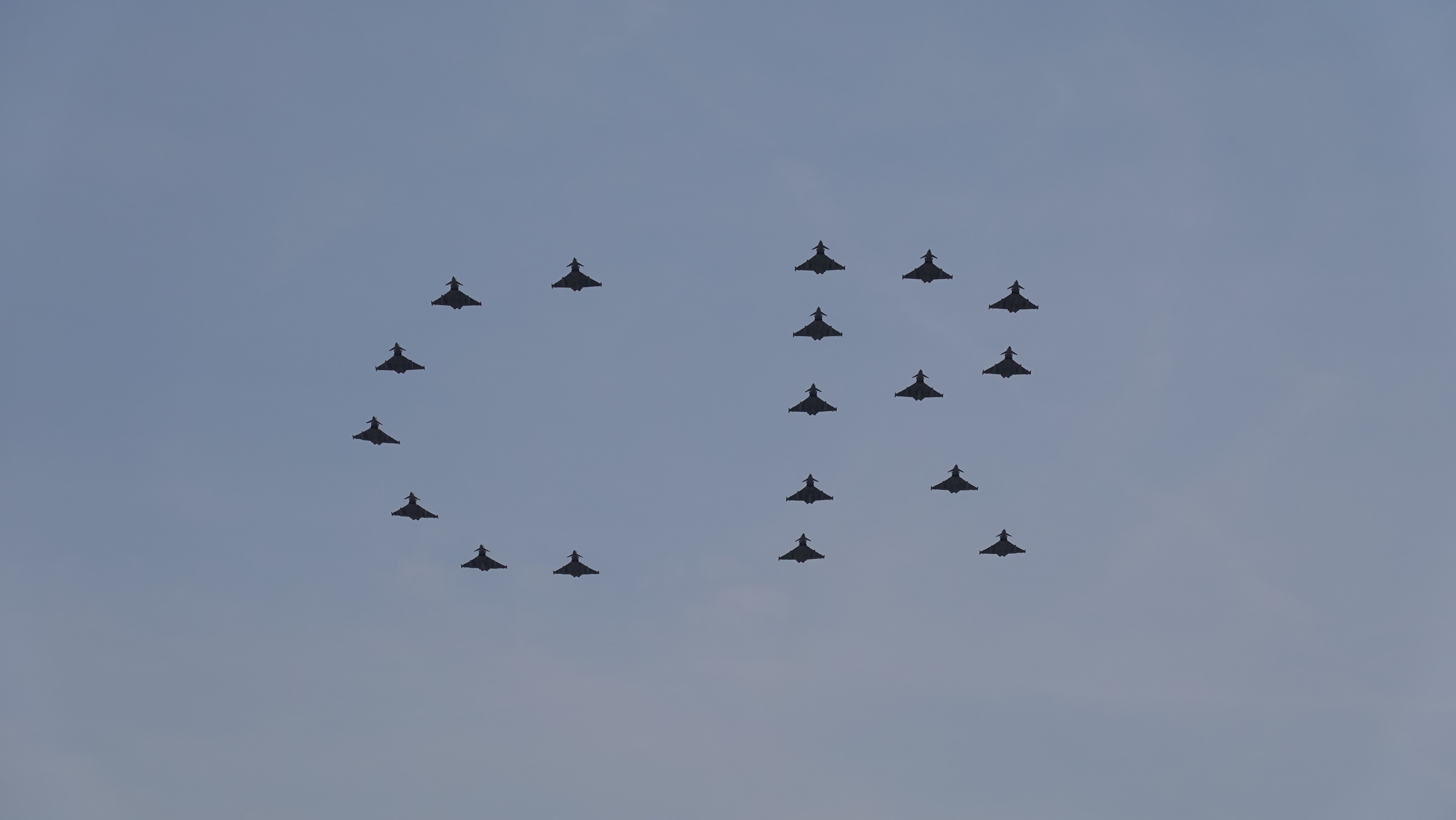
18 Typhoons formed the shape of a “CR” - standing for “Charles Rex”.

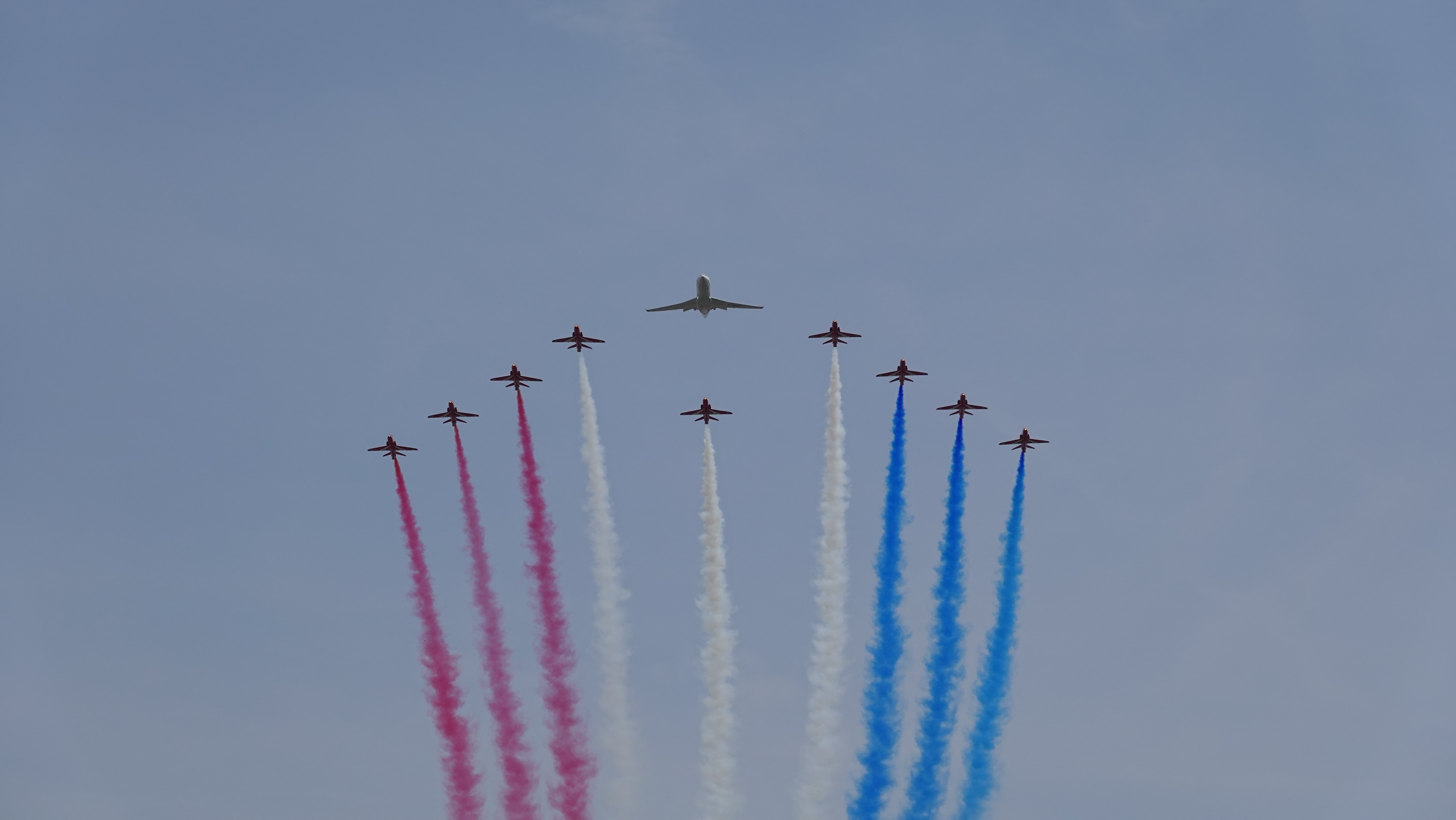
The Red Arrows fly over the Mall.

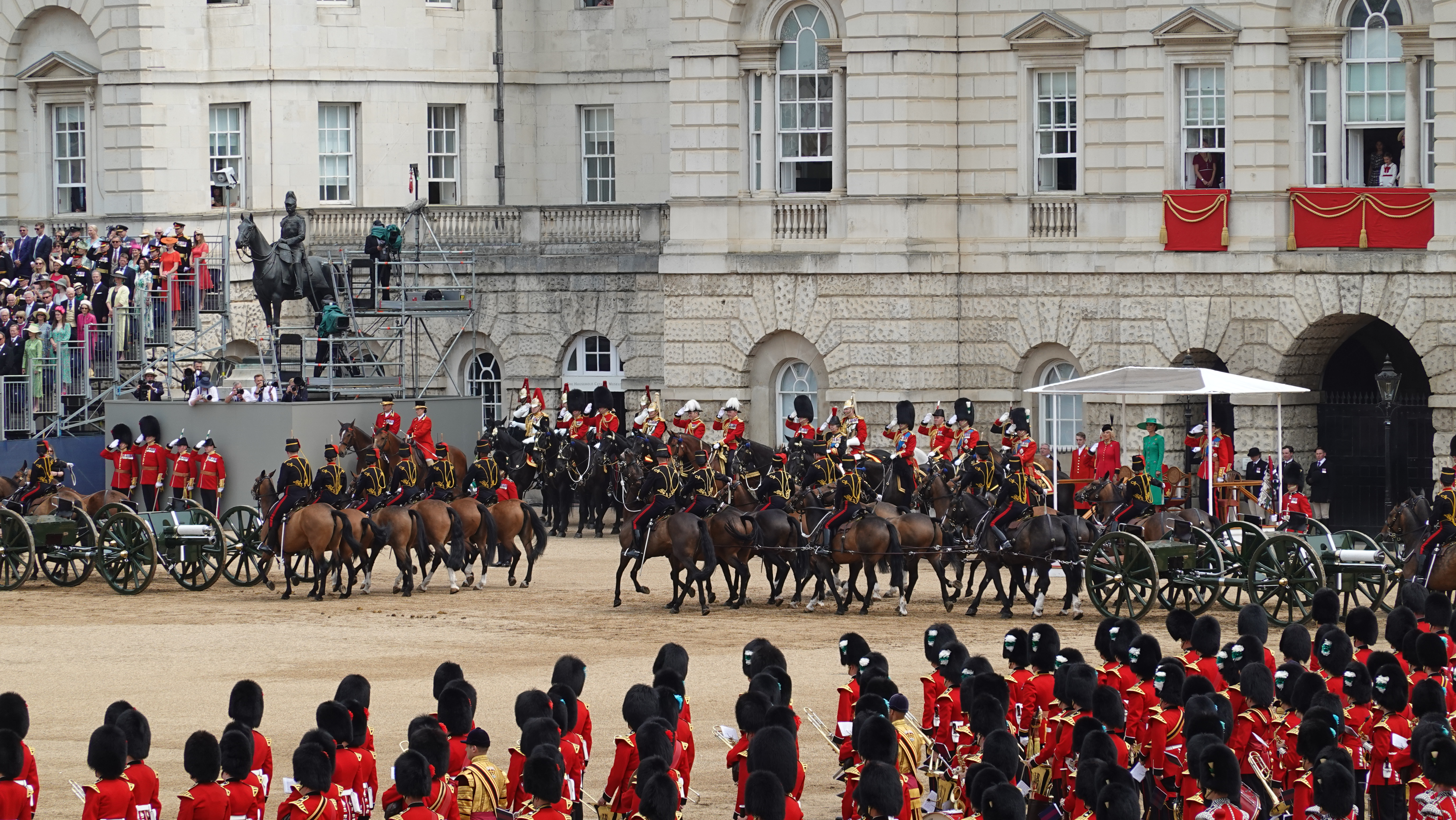
Horse Guards Parade
