= 2024 Trooping the Colour =

Parade for the King's Official Birthday

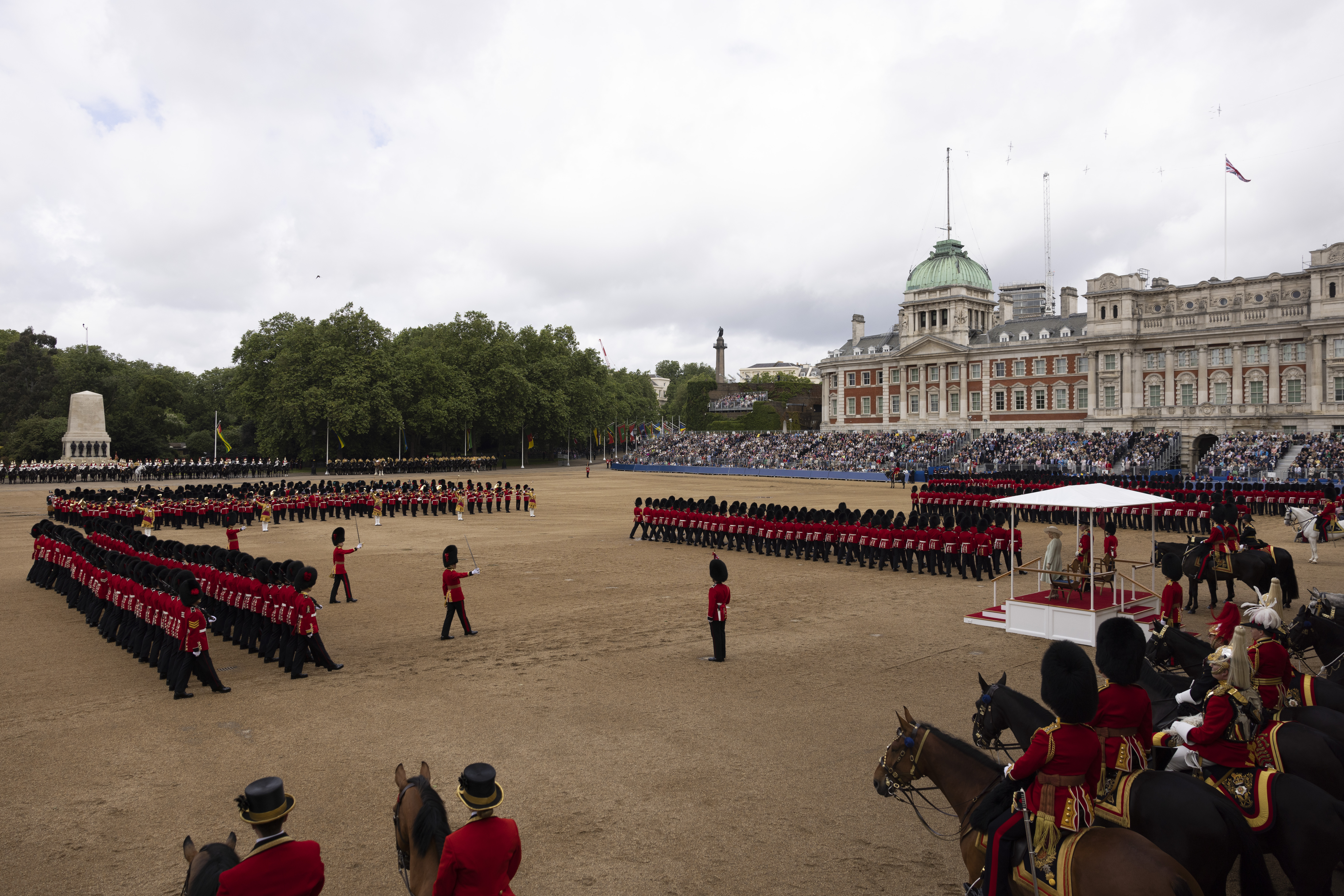
- Date: 15 June 2024; 2 years ago
- Locations: Horse Guards Parade, London, England
- Country: United Kingdom
- Previous event: 2023
- Next event: 2025
- Major events: King's Birthday Parade; Royal balcony appearance

The 2024 Trooping the Colour ceremony was held on Saturday 15 June to celebrate the official birthday of King Charles III. The colour being trooped was the King's Colour of 2nd Battalion, Irish Guards. (Note: The 2nd Battalion was represented by No. 9 Company, Irish Guards – one of five incremental companies employed to undertake public duties that maintain the colours and traditions of the foot guards battalions in suspended animation.)

Apart from being Charles' second Trooping the Colour ceremony since his accession to the throne, the 2024 ceremony occurred shortly after he had returned to his official duties after receiving a cancer diagnosis, and while his treatment was ongoing. Buckingham Palace confirmed on 30 May that the King would attend the ceremony, but that he would inspect troops while seated in an Ascot landau carriage alongside Queen Camilla rather than the traditional inspection done on horseback.

It was also announced that the Princess of Wales's role as Inspecting Officer in the Colonel's Review, a parade that takes place a week before the Trooping the Colour ceremony, would be taken by military officer Lt Gen James Bucknall after the Princess herself continued to be absent from public duties while recovering from cancer. The Colonel's Review took place on 8 June. Ahead of the event, the Princess wrote a letter to the Irish Guards apologising for her absence and wishing the regiment good luck.

Although she did not attend the Colonel's Review, on the eve of the Trooping ceremony it was announced that the Princess would be in attendance as part of the carriage parade with her children, and as a member of the royal family waving from the balcony of Buckingham Palace. This was her first public appearance since her cancer diagnosis.

== Balcony appearance ==
- The King and Queen
  - The Prince and Princess of Wales, the King's son and daughter-in-law
    - Prince George of Wales, the King's grandson
    - Princess Charlotte of Wales, the King's granddaughter
    - Prince Louis of Wales, the King's grandson
- The Princess Royal and Vice Admiral Sir Timothy Laurence, the King's sister and brother-in-law
- The Duke and Duchess of Edinburgh, the King's brother and sister-in-law
  - Lady Louise Mountbatten-Windsor, the King's niece

Other descendants of the King's maternal great-grandfather King George V and their families:

- The Duke and Duchess of Gloucester, the King's maternal first cousin once removed and his wife
- The Duke of Kent, the King's maternal first cousin once removed
