= The Queen's Platinum Jubilee Beacons =

Lighting of beacons across the Commonwealth to celebrate the Queen's Platinum Jubilee

- Date: 2 June 2022
- Location: United Kingdom; Bailiwick of Guernsey; Bailiwick of Jersey; Isle of Man; (United Kingdom) British Overseas Territories; Commonwealth of Nations
- Theme: Commemoration of the Platinum Jubilee of Queen Elizabeth II
- Website: queensjubileebeacons.com

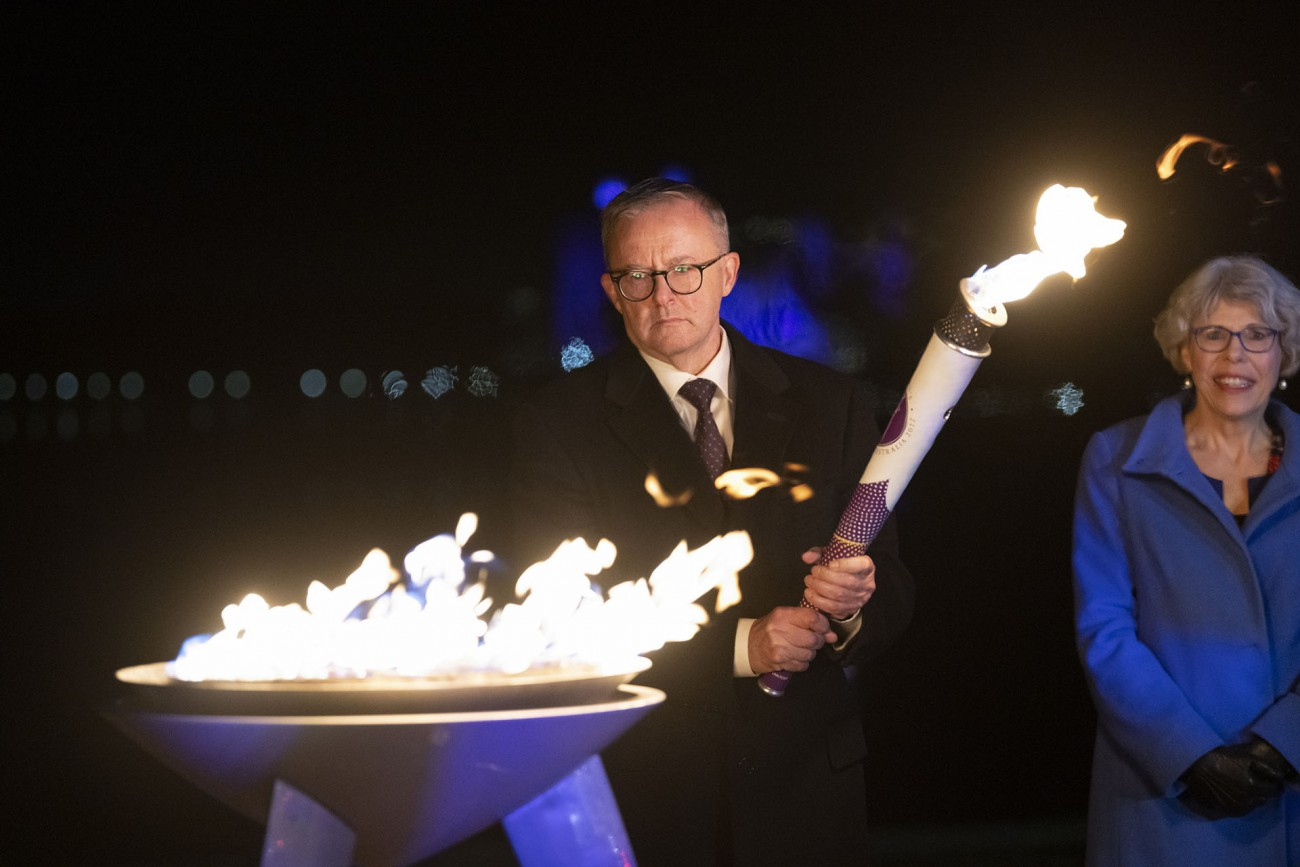
Lighting of the beacon in Canberra, Australia, by Prime Minister Anthony Albanese

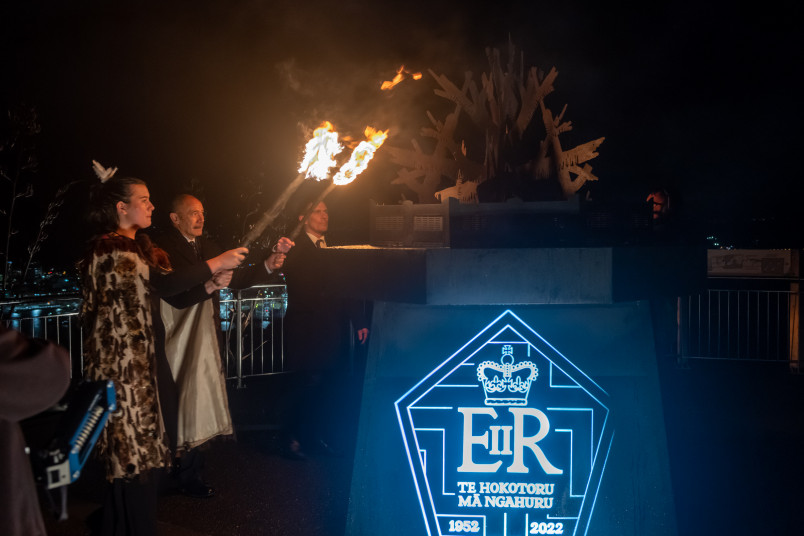
Lighting of the beacon in Wellington, New Zealand, by former Governor-General Sir Jerry Mateparae and the Mayor of Wellington Andy Foster

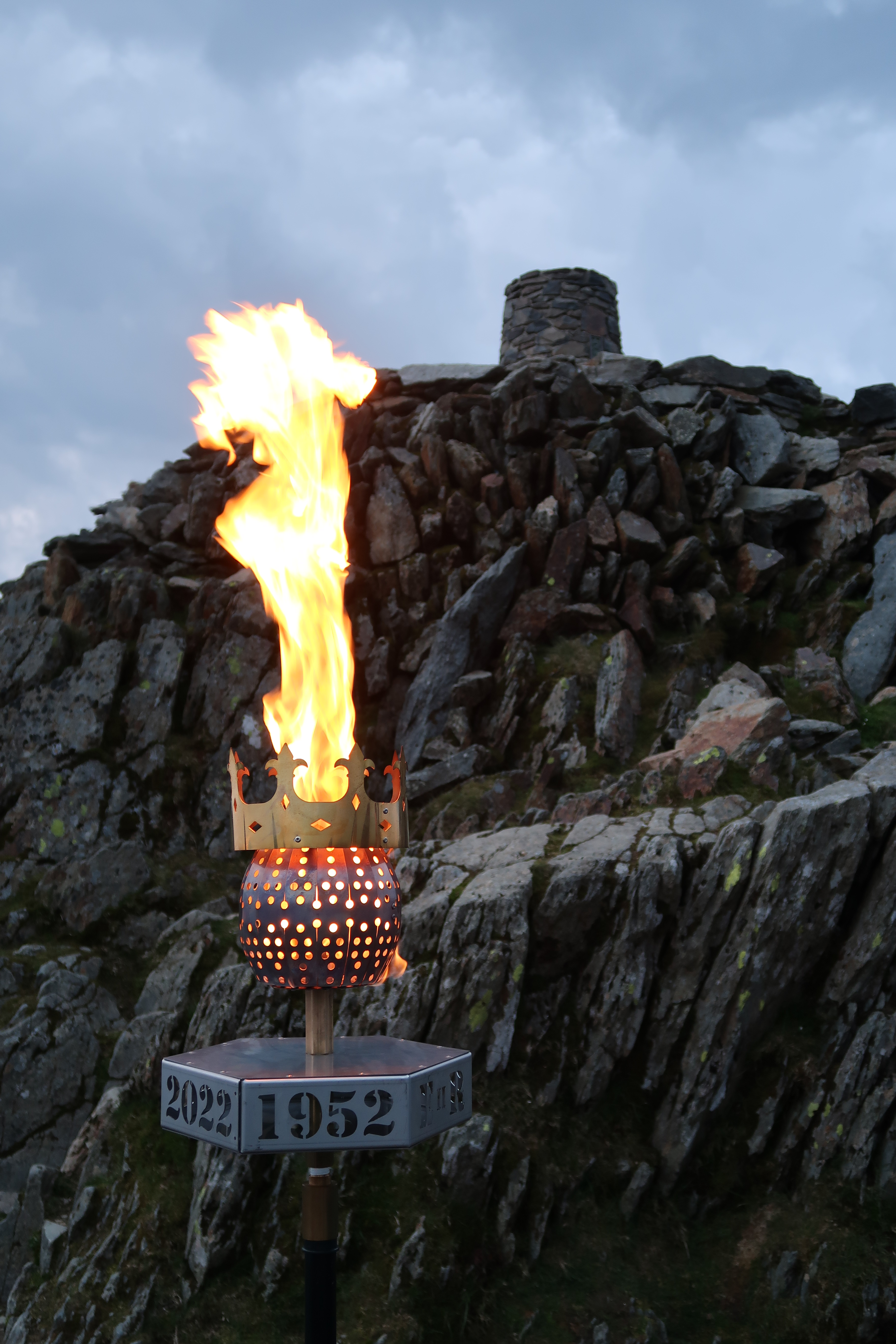
Beacon on Snowdon

The Queen's Platinum Jubilee Beacons were lit on 2 June 2022 throughout the United Kingdom, Channel Islands, Isle of Man and British Overseas Territories and each of the capital cities of Commonwealth countries, in celebration of the Platinum Jubilee of Queen Elizabeth II.

It followed the United Kingdom's long tradition of celebrating royal jubilees, weddings and coronations with the lighting of beacons.

A Commonwealth Song was sung by choirs all over the world to coincide exactly with the lighting of The Queen's Platinum Jubilee Beacons in all the 54 countries of the Commonwealth.

== Locations ==
An estimated 3,500 Jubilee Beacons were lit throughout the United Kingdom, Channel Islands, Isle of Man and British Overseas Territories.

For the first time, Jubilee beacons were also lit in each of the capital cities of Commonwealth nations throughout various time zones in 2022. Commonwealth countries with their capitals are listed below:

Country	Capital
Antigua and Barbuda	St. John's
Australia	Canberra
The Bahamas	Nassau
Bangladesh	Dhaka
Barbados	Bridgetown
Belize	Belmopan
Botswana	Gaborone
Brunei	Bandar Seri Begawan
Cameroon	Yaoundé
Canada	Ottawa
Cyprus	Nicosia
Dominica	Roseau
Eswatini	Mbabane; Lobamba
Fiji	Suva
The Gambia	Banjul
Ghana	Accra
Grenada	St. George's
Guyana	Georgetown
India	New Delhi
Jamaica	Kingston
Kenya	Nairobi
Kiribati	South Tarawa
Lesotho	Maseru
Malawi	Lilongwe
Malaysia	Kuala Lumpur; Putrajaya
Maldives	Malé
Malta	Valletta
Mauritius	Port Louis
Mozambique	Maputo
Namibia	Windhoek
Nauru	Yaren
New Zealand	Wellington
Nigeria	Abuja
Pakistan	Islamabad
Papua New Guinea	Port Moresby
Rwanda	Kigali
Saint Kitts and Nevis	Basseterre
Saint Lucia	Castries
Saint Vincent and the Grenadines	Kingstown
Samoa	Apia
Seychelles	Victoria
Sierra Leone	Freetown
Singapore	Singapore (Note: Singapore has no official distinct capital city as it is a city-state.)
Solomon Islands	Honiara
South Africa	Pretoria; Cape Town; Bloemfontein
Sri Lanka	Sri Jayawardenepura Kotte; Colombo
Tanzania	Dodoma
Tonga	Nukuʻalofa
Trinidad and Tobago	Port of Spain
Tuvalu	Funafuti
Uganda	Kampala
United Kingdom	London
Vanuatu	Port Vila
Zambia	Lusaka

== Song for the Commonwealth ==
A song was written to celebrate the Platinum Jubilee and was sung alongside the lighting of the Beacons around the UK and across the Commonwealth. Organised by the Commonwealth Resounds, hundreds of choirs joined to sing A Life Lived with Grace. The song was put together after a call for lyrics and subsequent compositions was won by Lucy Kiely and Vincent Atueyi from Australia and Nigeria, respectively.

The competition for the song was judged by:

- The Rt Hon. Patricia Scotland QC, Commonwealth Secretary-General
- Roderick Williams OBE, Baritone
- Judith Weir CBE, Master of the Queen's Music
- Alison Cox, Founder and Chair of Trustees, The Commonwealth Resounds / Head of Composition, The Purcell School for Young Musicians.
- Bruno Peek LVO, OBE, OPR
- Anne T. Gallagher AO Director General of the Commonwealth Foundation
- Graham Trew Baritone & Former Chairman of The Association of English Singers and Speakers

== See also ==
- Diamond Jubilee of Elizabeth II
- Platinum Party at the Palace
- Platinum Jubilee Pageant
