= Subaltern (military) =

British military term for a junior officer

A subaltern (IPA: /ˈsʌbəltərn/) is a primarily British military term for a junior officer. Literally meaning "subordinate", subaltern is used to describe commissioned officers below the rank of captain and generally comprises the various grades of lieutenant.

== United Kingdom ==
In the British Army, the senior subaltern rank was captain-lieutenant, obsolete since the 18th century. Before the Cardwell Reforms of the British Army in 1871, the ranks of cornet and ensign were the junior subaltern ranks in the cavalry and infantry respectively, and were responsible for the flag. A subaltern takes temporary command of proceedings during Trooping the Colour. Within the ranks of subaltern, in a battalion or regiment, a Senior Subaltern may be appointed, usually by rank and seniority, who is responsible for discipline within the junior officer ranks and is responsible to the adjutant for this duty, although the adjutant is ultimately responsible to the commanding officer for the discipline of all the junior officers within the unit.

=== Women's ranks ===
From 1941 to 1949, the Auxiliary Territorial Service (ATS) of the British Army used the ranks of second subaltern and subaltern, which were equivalent to second lieutenant and lieutenant respectively. From 1949 to 1950, the ATS's successor organisation, the Women's Royal Army Corps, also used the same ranks until it abandoned them in favour of regular British Army ranks. Princess Elizabeth held the rank of second subaltern in the ATS during World War II.

== United States ==
The Continental Army carried over the rank structure from the British Army including the subaltern ranks of lieutenant, cornet, ensign and subaltern. Continental Army subalterns ranks were supposed to wear green colored cockades in their hats. State militias in the American Revolutionary War period had ensign and sometimes subaltern ranks, with the subaltern rank below the ensign rank where they coexisted.

In 1800, the United States Army's cornet, ensign and subaltern ranks were replaced by second lieutenant. In 1862, the United States Navy began using the ensign rank, which began using a gold bar as insignia in 1922. Second lieutenants received the gold bar insignia in 1917. When the United States Air Force became a separate military branch from the Army, it kept the Army's commissioned officer ranks and insignia.

== See also ==
- Officer (armed forces)
- Warrant officer
- Lieutenant grades
  - Lieutenant commander
  - Lieutenant (junior grade)
  - Third Lieutenant
  - Sub-lieutenant
