= Winston (horse) =

Horse ridden by members of the British royal family

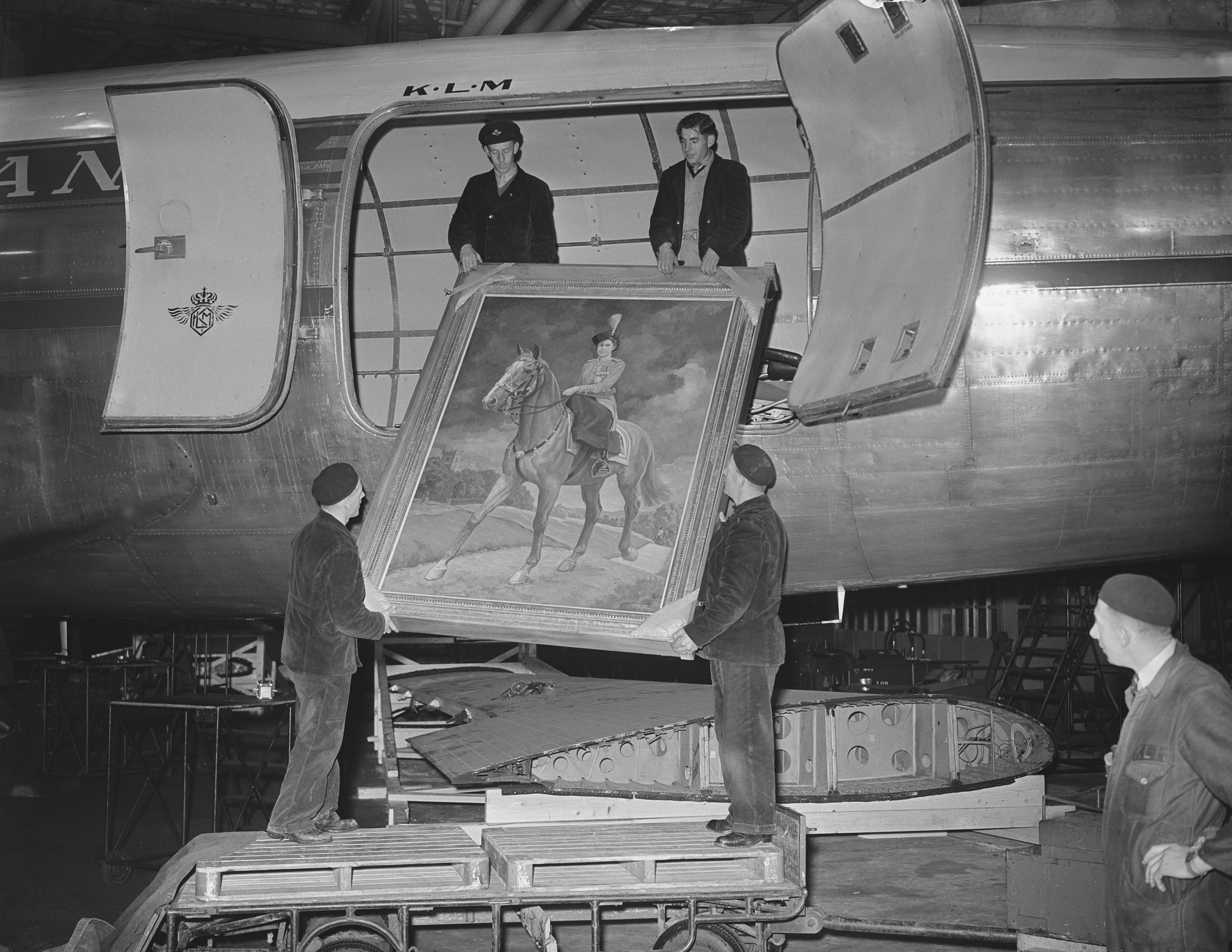
A painting of Queen Elizabeth II riding Winston

Winston (1937–1957) was a chestnut gelding ridden by both King George VI in 1947 and Queen Elizabeth II in the Trooping the Colour ceremony from 1949 to 1956.

== Biography ==
Winston, whose sire was Erehwemos, was foaled in Yorkshire in 1937. In 1944 he was sold to the Mounted Branch of the Metropolitan Police Service. Although named after Winston Churchill, the letter "W" was used to name all police horses in 1944. As a police horse, Winston often was present on duty at public events such as the Changing of the Guard before he was selected for Royal duties.

In 1947, Winston carried King George VI during the first Trooping of the Colour to take place since 1939. Winston participated in various roles in other Royal ceremonial events when not working as a police horse. From 1949 to 1951, then Princess Elizabeth took her father's place at the ceremony, becoming the first British Queen since Elizabeth I to review her troops on horseback. Though other police horse were made available, the Queen always preferred Winston. The year of 1951 led to the future Queen first wearing her red Guards uniform; prior to this she wore a blue uniform.

During the Coronation of Queen Elizabeth II procession, Winston was ridden by Sir John Nott-Bower, the Commissioner of Police of the Metropolis.

Winston retired from Troopings and other Royal Duties in 1956. Whilst later being ridden by a mounted police officer at the Police mounted training establishment at Thames Ditton, Winston slipped and dislocated his back on 7 February 1957, requiring him to be euthanised.

From 1957 the Queen rode a chestnut horse named Imperial.

== See also ==
- Trooping the Colour
- Burmese (horse)
