= Trooping the Colour =

Military ceremony in the British Army and other Commonwealth militaries

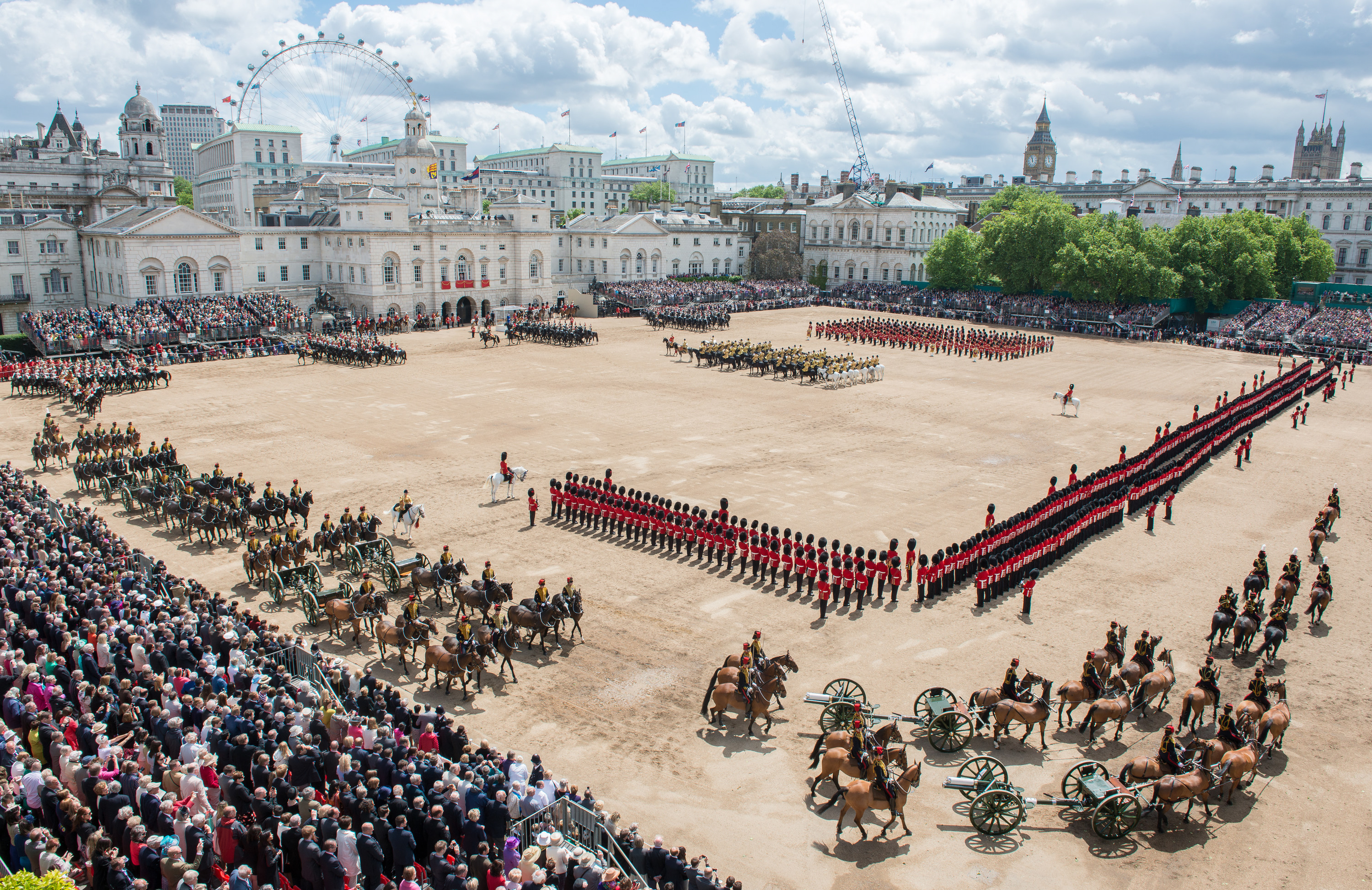
Trooping the Colour, Horse Guards Parade, Central London, June 2013.

Trooping the Colour is a ceremonial event performed every year on Horse Guards Parade in London, United Kingdom by regiments of the Household Division, to celebrate the official birthday of the sovereign, though the event is not necessarily held on that day. It is officially known as the Sovereign's Birthday Parade, or the King's Birthday Parade. Similar events are held in other Commonwealth countries. In the UK, it is the biggest event of the ceremonial calendar, and is watched by millions on television, on the streets of London, and in the stands at Horse Guards Parade.

Historically, colours were once used on the battlefield as a rallying point. They display the battle honours of a regiment, and are a focal point of Trooping the Colour. The ceremony has marked the sovereign's official birthday since 1748. Each year, one of the five Foot Guards regiments of the Household Division is selected to slowly troop (carry) its colour through the massed ranks of guards, who stand with arms (weapons) presented. During the slow march-past, the colours are lowered before the monarch, and during the quick march-past the colours fly. The monarch will salute the colours in return.

Prior to the start of the ceremony, the monarch processes down The Mall from Buckingham Palace to Horse Guards Parade in a royal procession, with a Sovereign's Escort of Household Cavalry (mounted troops or horse guards). During the ceremony proper, after receiving a royal salute, the monarch inspects his troops of the Household Division and the King's Troop. Music is provided by the massed bands of the Foot Guards and the Mounted Band of the Household Cavalry, together with a Corps of Drums, and pipers, totalling approximately 400 musicians. Once obtained, the colour is displayed at the head of the march past the sovereign in slow and quick time, by the Foot Guards, the Household Cavalry, and the King's Troop. (The latter two elements, being mounted, conduct a walk-past and a trot-past.)

Returning to Buckingham Palace, the monarch surveys a further march-past from outside the gates. Following a 41-gun salute by the King's Troop in Green Park, the royal family make an appearance on the palace balcony for a Royal Air Force flypast. (Note: Occasionally, aircraft from the British Army and the Royal Navy take part as well, as during the 2022 Queen's Platinum Jubilee.)

== Sovereign's official birthday and history ==
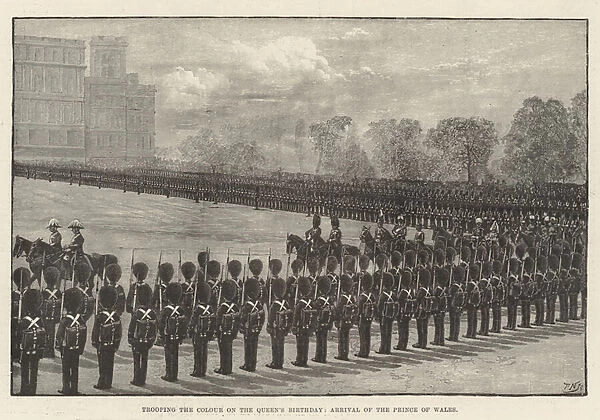
Trooping the Colour in 1890.

=== Sovereign's birthday parade ===
In the United Kingdom, Trooping the Colour is also known as the 'King's Birthday Parade' ('Queen's Birthday Parade' when the monarch is female). First performed during the reign of Charles II (1660–1685), in 1748, it was decided that the parade of Trooping the Colour should mark the 'official' birthday of the Sovereign. In 1760, after the accession of George III, it became an annual event.

In 1892, the only member of the royal family to attend was Prince George, Duke of Cambridge, due to court mourning for the death of Prince Albert Victor, Duke of Clarence. Queen Victoria herself only attended Trooping the Colour once, in 1895, when it was held at Windsor Castle. Although some elements of the parade have remained fairly constant, the ceremonial seen today was not fixed until 1889.

=== Sovereign's 'official birthday' ===
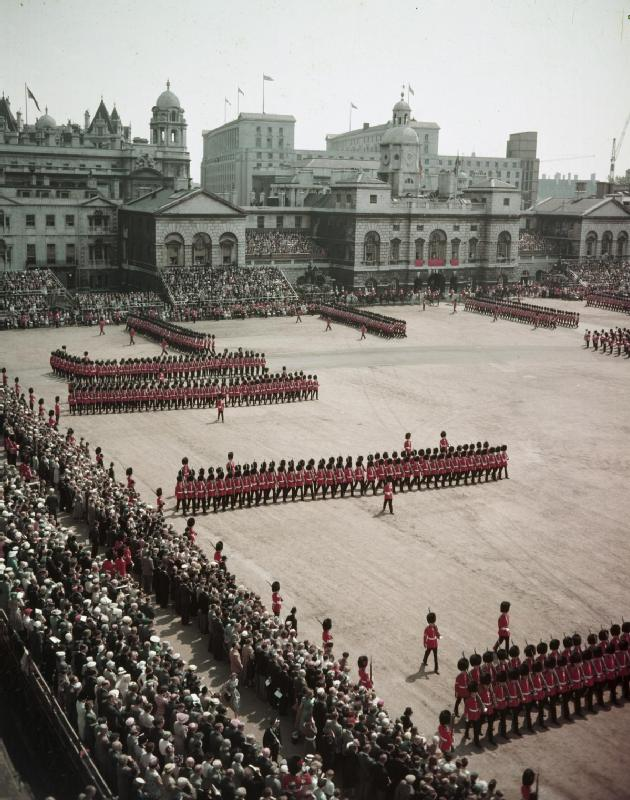
Trooping the Colour in 1956.

Edward VII kept Trooping the Colour in May or June, because of the vagaries of British weather (his actual birthday being in November). It coincides with publication of the Birthday Honours List, and usually takes place at Horse Guards Parade by St James's Park, London. It is followed by a 41-gun salute at noon in Green Park, and a flypast over Buckingham Palace, watched by the royal family from the Palace balcony.

Since 1959, it has typically been held on a Saturday in June. From 1979 to 2017 it was always held on the Saturday from 11 to 17 June; however, in 2018 it was held on 9 June and in 2019 on 8 June. During 2020 and 2021, a modified ceremony took place at Windsor Castle, due to the COVID-19 pandemic.

In 2022, Trooping the Colour was held on a Thursday, the date of 2 June coinciding with the anniversary of Queen Elizabeth II's coronation on 2 June 1953.

In 2023, Charles III's first birthday parade as monarch took place on 17 June.

=== Broadcast ===
Trooping the Colour was first broadcast by BBC Radio in 1927, with a commentary by Major J. B. S. Bourne-May, a retired officer of the Coldstream Guards. It was first shown on BBC Television in 1937.

The parade is witnessed by a global TV audience of many millions. In 1961, in return for the BBC covering the Moscow Victory Day Parade, Trooping the Colour was broadcast in the Soviet Union with the Russian commentary being given in London by Yuri Gagarin, the first cosmonaut.

Over the years, commentary for the live broadcast in the UK by BBC1 has been provided by Richard Dimbleby (until 1965), Tom Fleming (1966-1988), David Dimbleby (1989 and 1991), Eric Robson (1990 and 1998-2000), Julian Tutt (1992-1997), Edward Stourton (2001-2002), Huw Edwards (2003-2023), and recently by Clare Balding (from 2024), together with expert guests and interviews with some of the personnel involved. The BBC's live broadcast has become accessible to an international audience via live streaming on BritBox in both the United States and Canada. Beginning in 2019, The BBC also streams the parade live on YouTube.

For the Platinum Jubilee in 2022, additional live videos commentary of the parade for international viewers were provided by Sky News UK and The Daily Telegraph newspaper's YouTube channels.

=== Sovereign's participation ===
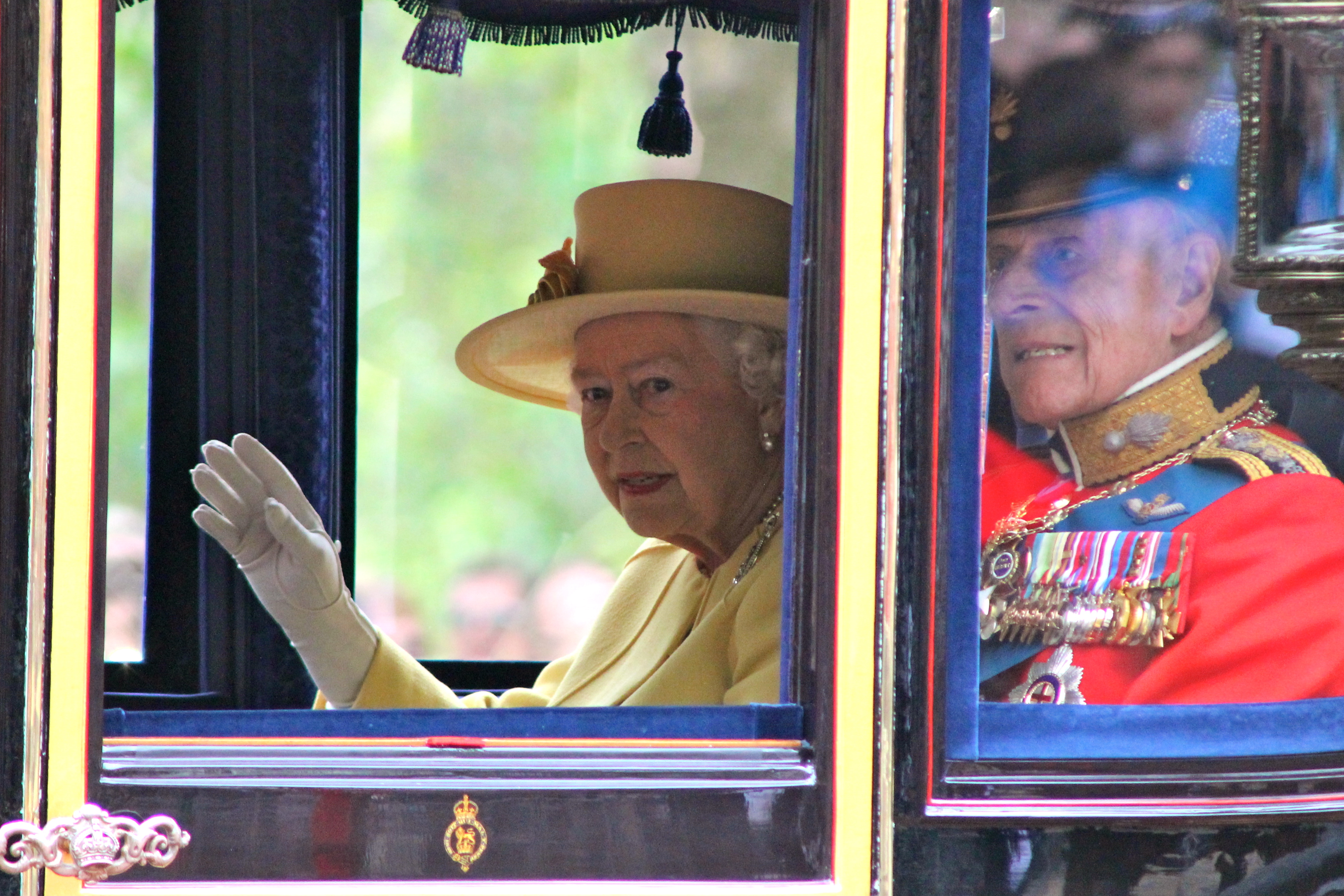
Queen Elizabeth II with the Duke of Edinburgh at Trooping the Colour, June 2012.

Queen Elizabeth II attended Trooping the Colour in every year of her reign, except in 1955 when the event was cancelled due to a national rail strike. Having ridden her mare Burmese between 1969 and 1986, the Queen rode in a carriage from 1987. On 13 June 1981, she and her horse were startled by an unemployed youth, Marcus Sarjeant, who fired six blank rounds from a starting revolver.

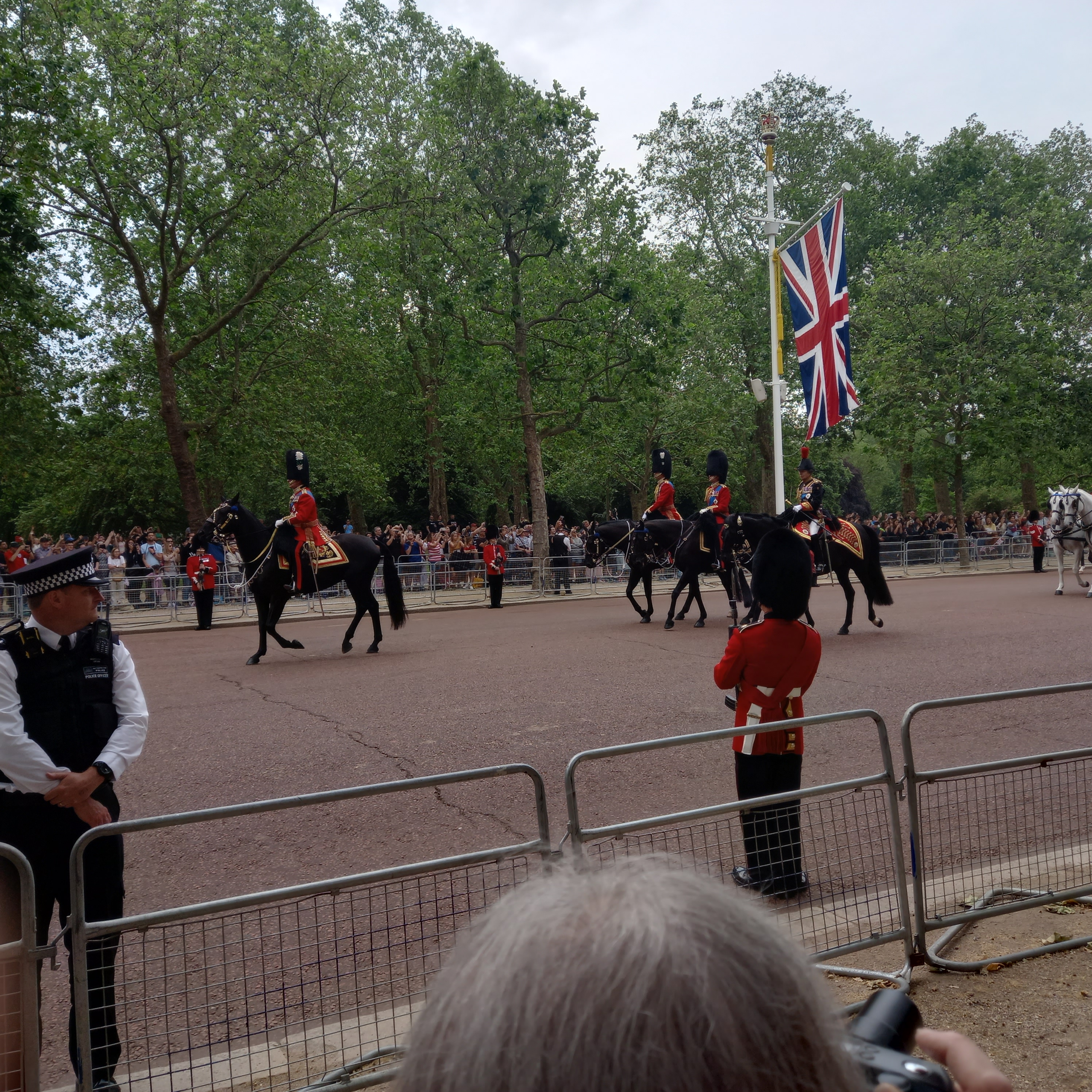
King Charles III (left), in the uniform of the Welsh Guards, is followed by William, Prince of Wales, Prince Edward, Duke of Edinburgh and Anne, Princess Royal in 2023.

Her 80th birthday in 2006 was marked by a large flypast of forty aircraft, led by the Battle of Britain Memorial Flight and culminating with the Red Arrows. It was followed by the first feu de joie ('fire of joy') fired in her presence during her reign, a second being fired at her Diamond Jubilee celebrations in 2012. In 2008, a flypast of fifty-five aircraft commemorated the RAF's 90th anniversary.

In 2023, at the first Trooping the Colour of Charles III as king, he revived the tradition of the sovereign riding on horseback and in uniform. The flypast of some 70 aircraft was a reprise of the display originally intended for the coronation, which had been curtailed due to poor weather. From 2025, the King opted to resume using a horse-drawn royal state carriage.

== Participants and parade summary ==
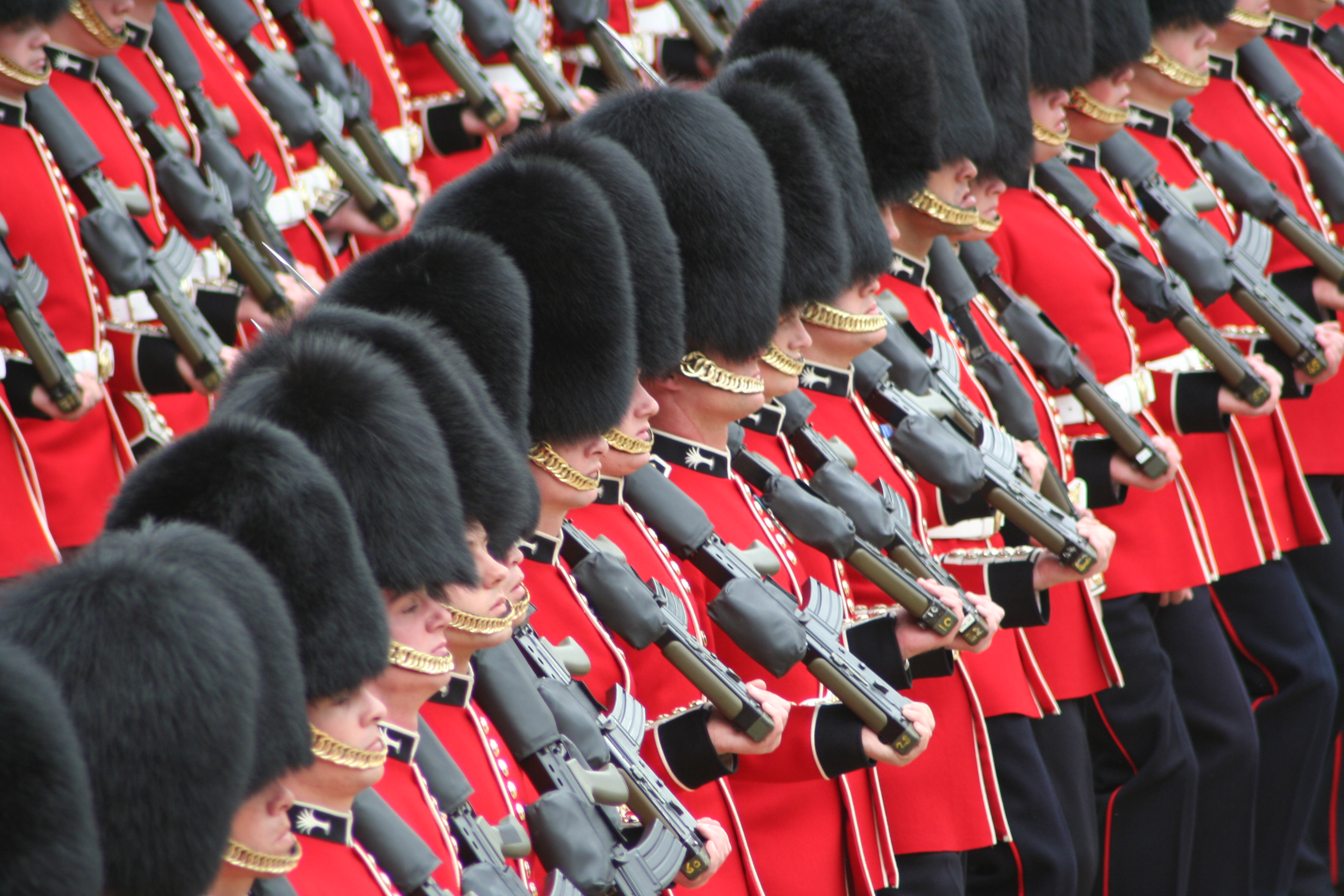
A company of Welsh Guards, recognisable by the leeks on their collars and five-button groupings on their jackets, denoting their status as the most junior of the five Foot Guards regiments.

On the day of Trooping the Colour, the Royal Standard is flown from Buckingham Palace and from Horse Guards Building.

=== A note on sources ===
The information for the ensuing section is drawn from the visuals and music, plus the annual commentary and analysis on the BBC's live broadcast, as well as the annual programme for the event.

=== Foot Guards, including Escort to the Colour (No. 1 Guard) ===
Nos. 1–6 Guards: six companies of Foot Guards, each comprising three officers (Major or Captain, two Subalterns) and seventy-one other ranks, line two sides of the perimeter of Horse Guards Parade in an extended 'L' shape. This recalls the defensive formation known as the 'hollow square'.

All six companies are collectively commanded as 'Guards...', and individually by company number, e.g., 'No. 3 Guard...'. Up to eight Guards have taken part, the number varying over the years. The most Guards ever seen on parade was eleven, as seen on the 1919 parade held in Hyde Park.

The battalion trooping its colour in any given year is No. 1 Guard. During the parade, they are referred to as 'Escort FOR the Colour' (and, once they have collected their colour during the ceremony, as 'Escort TO the Colour'). At the outset, the colour is held by the Colour Party – a colour sergeant and two other guardsmen of No. 1 Guard, standing well-spaced on the northern side of Horse Guards Parade. Once obtained by the Regimental Sergeant Major of No. 1 Guard, the colour is borne through the ranks of Nos. 2–6 Guards by an Ensign of No. 1 Guard.

=== Mounted troops and Sovereign's Escort ===
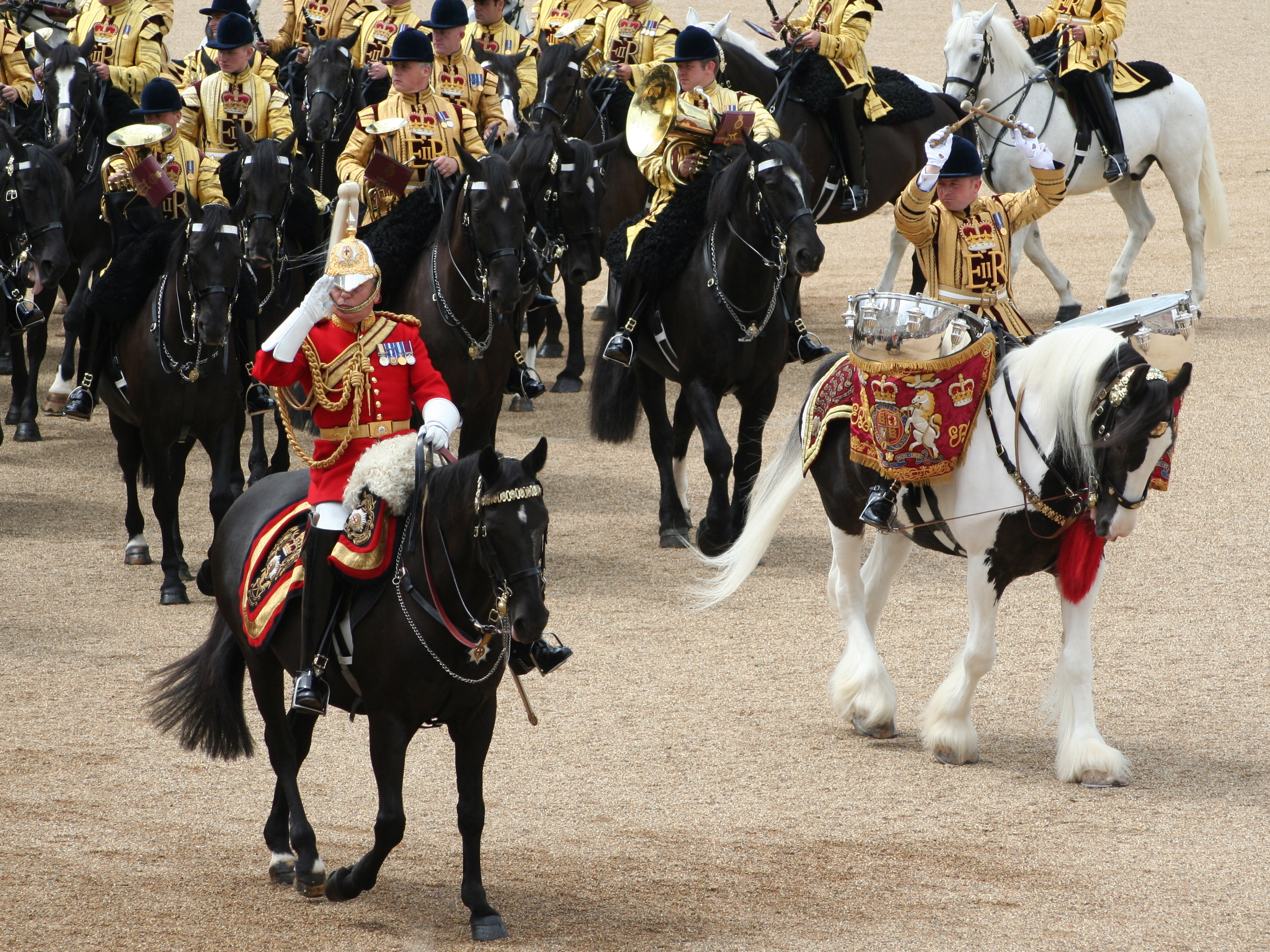
Mounted band of the Household Cavalry at Trooping the Colour 2007. The rider of the piebald (black-and-white) drum horse, working the reins with his feet, crosses drumsticks above his head in salute.

Lining the edge of St. James's Park are the King's Troop, Royal Horse Artillery and the Household Cavalry Mounted Regiment; the Life Guards and the Blues and Royals.

In the Royal Procession, the Household Cavalry are termed 'Sovereign's Escort'. Two divisions ride before the King mounted on horseback and two behind, and the Life Guards and the Blues and Royals alternate these positions each year.

=== Commanding officers and parade coordination ===
Three mounted officers drawn from No. 1 Guard give drill commands during the parade. The most senior is the Field Officer in Brigade Waiting (rank of Lieutenant Colonel), occupying a central position on the parade ground. He is assisted by the Major of the Parade, who is positioned by No. 1 Guard, and the Adjutant, positioned by No. 6 Guard.

The Garrison Sergeant Major of London District, who is not mounted, coordinates the whole event on the parade ground and the approach road from The Mall.

=== Military bands ===
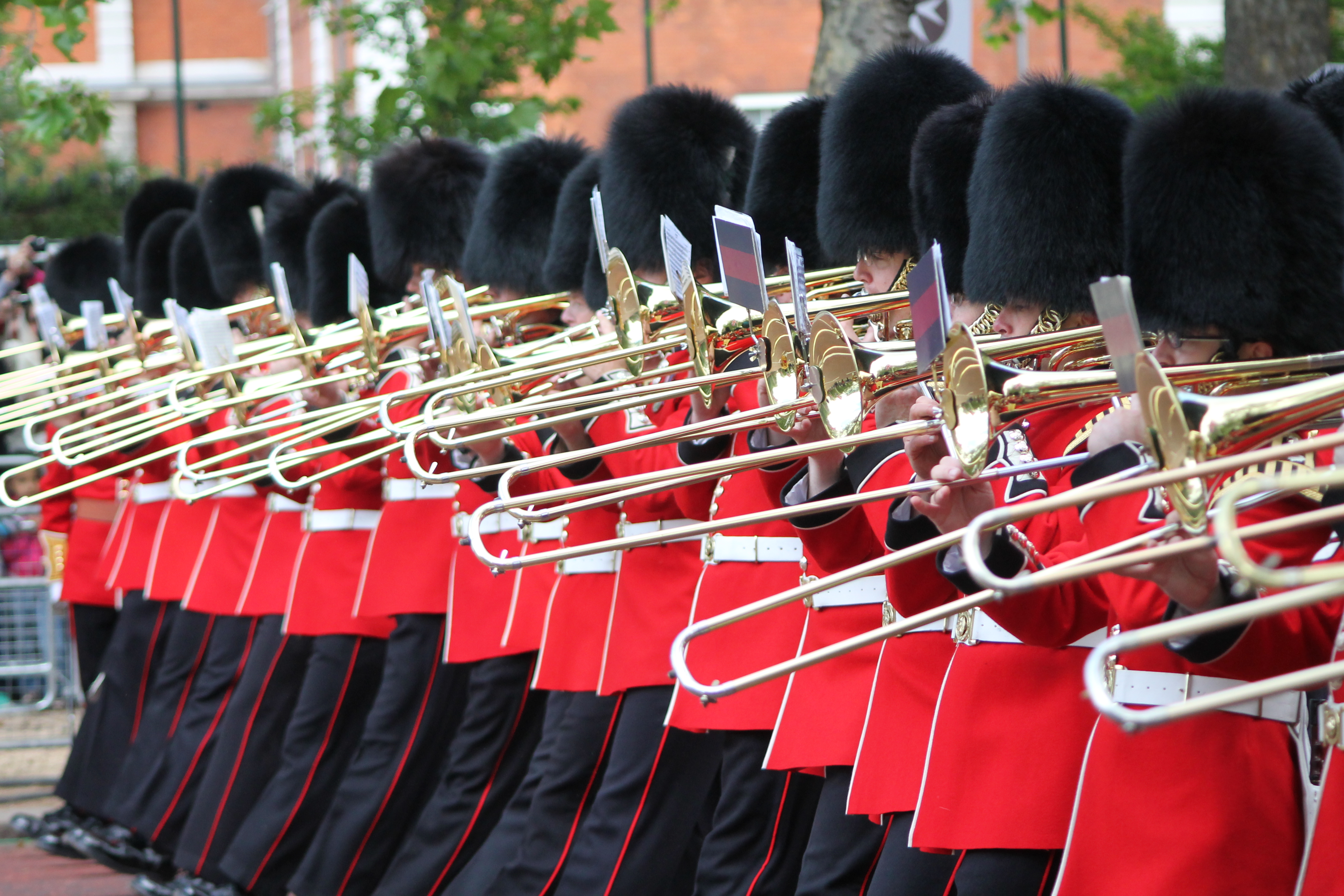
Musicians of the Foot Guards marching along the Mall, June 2012.

With almost 400 musicians on the field, led by the Massed Bands of the Household Division, the music forms an integral part of the day. The massed bands of the Foot Guards number over 200 musicians. Joining them, since 2014, is the Mounted Band of the Household Cavalry. The musicians of all these bands are all members of the Royal Corps of Army Music. There is also a Corps of Drums from several of the regiments and, on some occasions, pipe bands of the Scots Guards and Irish Guards. As per divisional tradition, the Corps of Drums and Pipe Bands form up behind the Massed Bands. As per Queen Elizabeth II's request, during a Scots or Irish Guards troop, the Pipers would march to the front of the Massed Bands to play the regimental quick marches of the Scots and Irish Guards as their Guards march past in quick time.

=== Summary of the parade design ===
The entire parade is best understood as an exercise of several elements carried out in slow and quick march time, with the Trooping the Colour phase forming the centrepiece.

- The Sovereign inspects first the Foot Guards and then the Household Cavalry and King's Troop, to slow and quick march music respectively.
- Then the massed bands 'troop' before the Sovereign in slow and quick time. A lone drummer breaks away to No. 1 Guard.
- Drummer's Call signals No. 1 Guard; the Escort for the Colour, to march to the centre of the field and obtain their colour from the Colour Party. The massed bands execute the 'Spin Wheel' manoeuvre.
- As 'Escort TO the Colour', No. 1 Guard then slowly troops its regimental colour through the ranks of Guards Nos. 6–2.
- After forming divisions, Nos. 1–6 Guards march past the Sovereign in slow and quick time.
- To music from the mounted band, the King's Troop leads the Household Cavalry past the Sovereign, first in walk-march and then in sitting-trot (i.e., slow and quick time for the horses). The mounted band then salute the Sovereign as they walk off.
- Finally, led by the Sovereign's Escort, the massed bands play the Sovereign back to Buckingham Palace, the foot guards following, as the King's Troop leaves Horse Guards first to Green Park.

== Ceremonial commands and troop movements ==
The entire parade is supervised by the Field Officer in Brigade Waiting (sometimes shortened to 'Field Officer'), with the assistance of the Brigade Major and the Adjutant, all on horseback, and joined by the London District Garrison Sergeant Major, who is unmounted and coordinates the proceedings of the ceremony.

=== March on ===
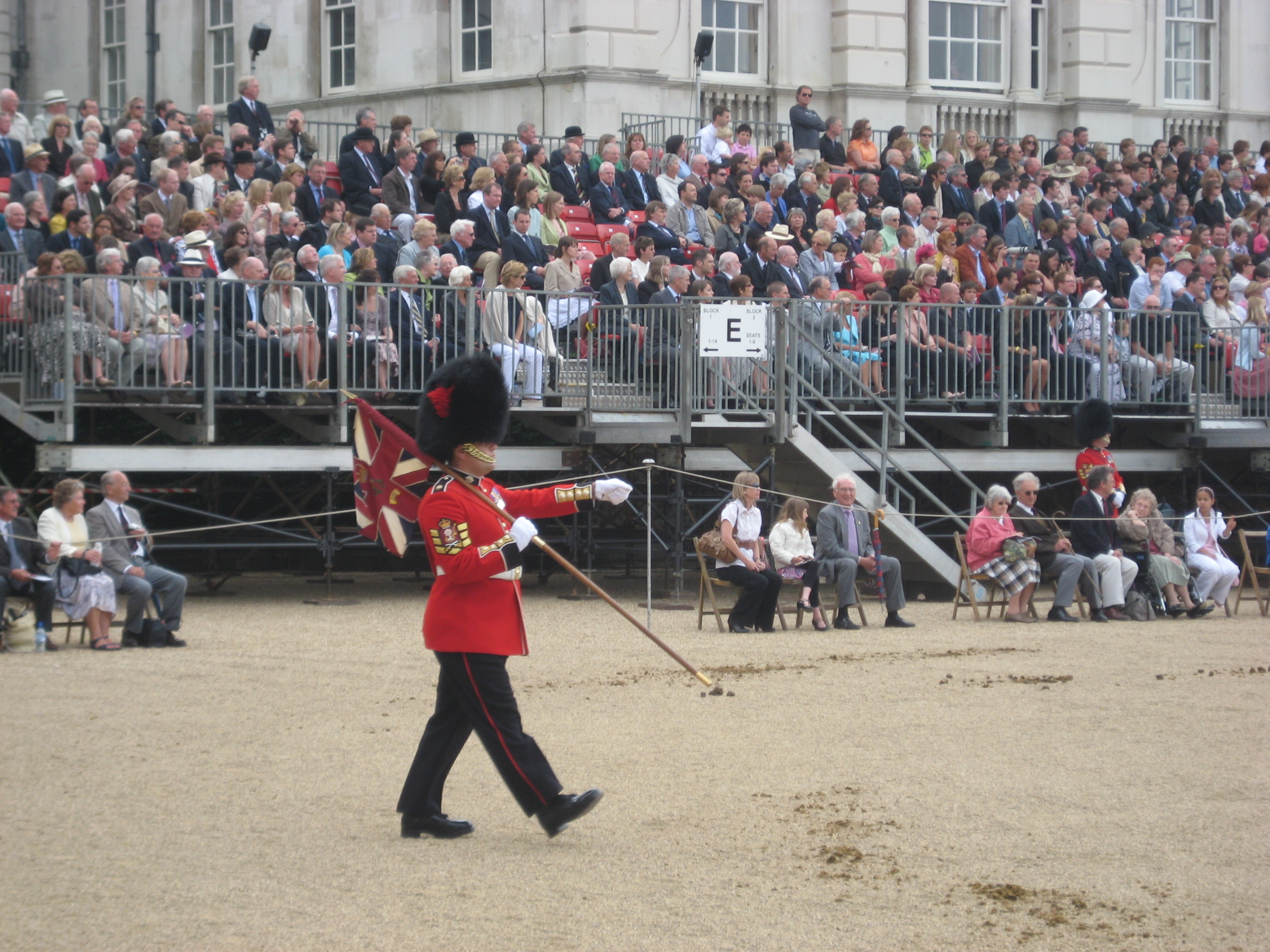
Colour marker point marching at end of parade.

A detail of guardsmen bearing marker flags marches on, to mark the positions of Nos. 1-6 Guards. These marker flags are the respective company colours from each regiment.

Preceded by their regimental bands, Nos. 1-6 Guards march into position. No. 1 Guard is 'Escort for the Colour'.

- Nos. 1-5 Guards align in two ranks on the west side of the parade ground facing Horse Guards Building.
- No. 6 Guard lines up perpendicular to them on the north side, thus making an 'L' shape. Up to eight Guards companies may take part. Nos. 7 and 8 Guards, if present, would line up next to No. 6 Guard. In 2009, to reflect the successful recruitment efforts of the Irish Guards, there were seven Guards on Horse Guards.
- The massed bands are on the south side, by the gardens of 10 Downing Street.
- Adjacent to No. 6 Guard is the Colour Party made up of three soldiers. A snare drummer joins them in the march on. As the party takes its place the drummer marches off and the colour's casing is removed, revealing the colour to be trooped.
- The King's Troop, the Household Cavalry, and their mounted band form up behind Nos. 1-5 Guards. (Note: 2011 marked the first time that the King's Troop, Royal Horse Artillery did not attend the ceremony since its first appearance in 1997. Instead, they performed the gun salutes on the anniversary of the Queen's coronation (2 June) and on the Duke of Edinburgh's birthday the day before. The job of handling the salutes was entrusted to the Honourable Artillery Company in the Tower of London grounds with a 62-gun Royal Salute as per tradition.)

Guards half-companies line up on the road to Horse Guards Parade, to provide security to the Royal Family that will arrive later, and to the marching and mounted contingents.

=== Arrival of the sovereign ===
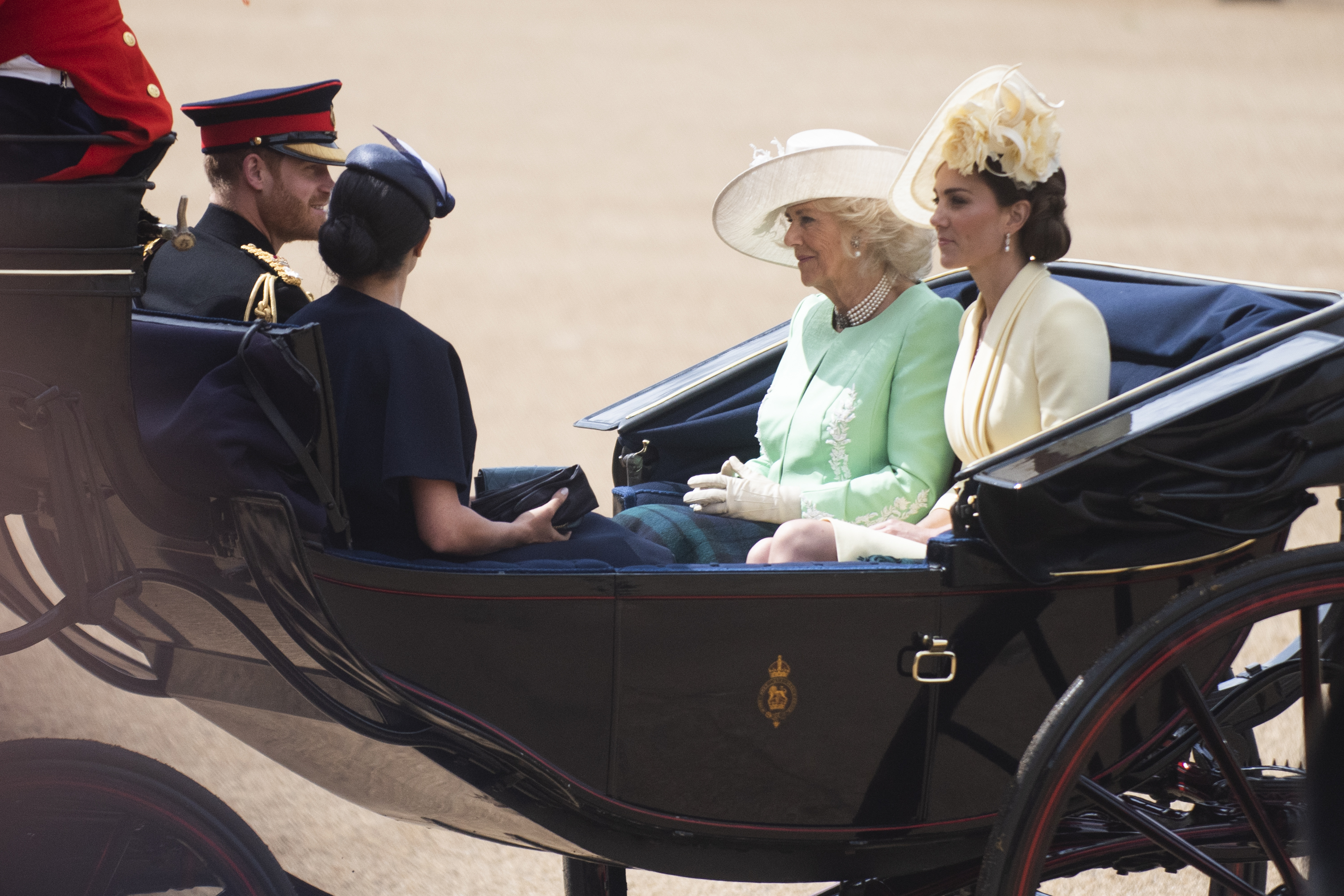
Carriage carrying the then Duchess of Cornwall, Duchess of Cambridge and the Duke and Duchess of Sussex, June 2019.

Preceding the sovereign, senior members of the royal family arrive in barouches to view the ceremony from a central first floor window in the Duke of Wellington's former office in Horse Guards Building. This procession turns at the Guards Memorial, and No. 3 Guard has opened ranks to allow their carriages to pass through.

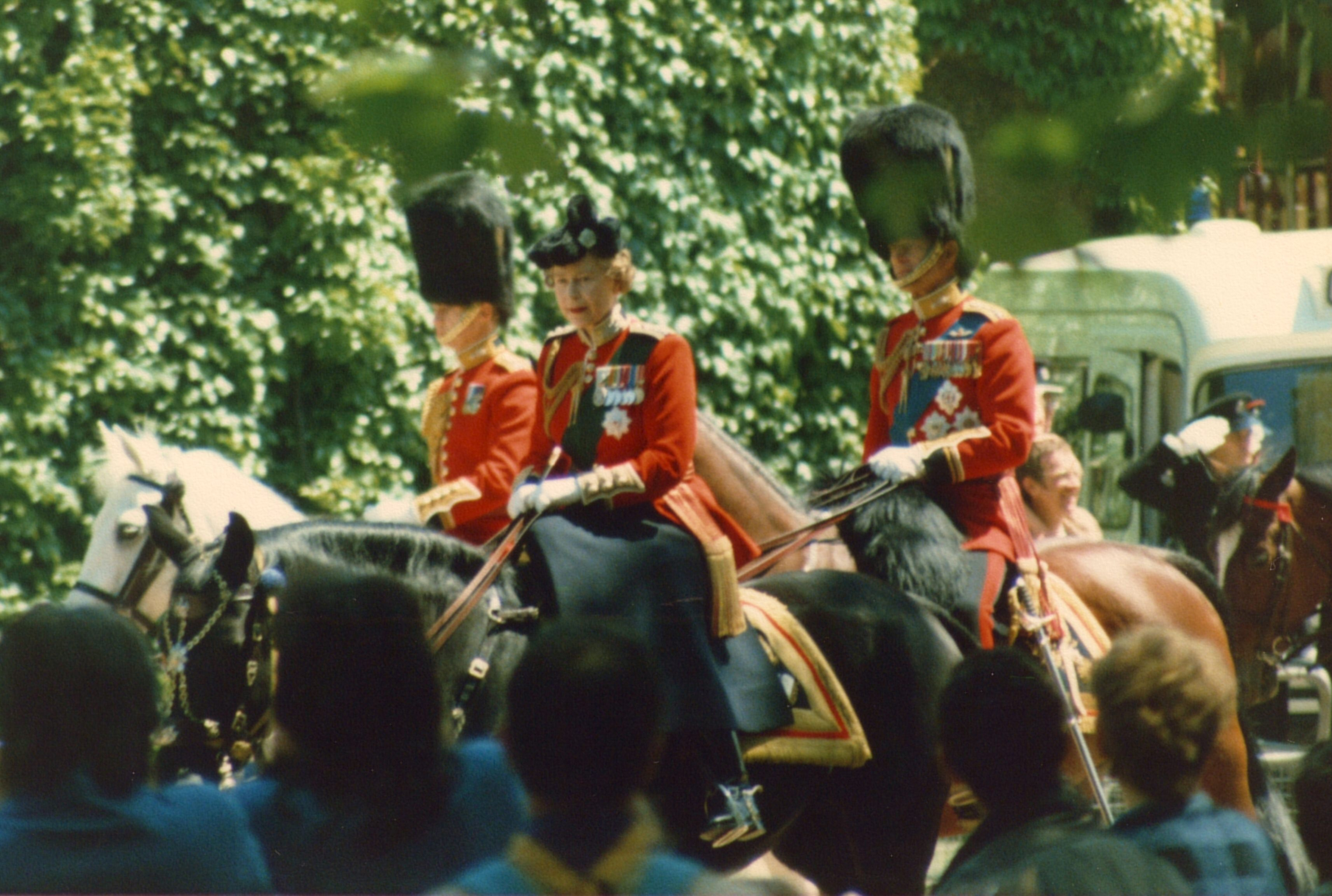
Elizabeth II riding to Trooping the Colour for the last time in 1986 on her horse Burmese. She travelled in a carriage of the Royal Mews for the remainder of her reign.

Preceded by the Sovereign's Escort, the King (Colonel-in-Chief) will journey from Buckingham Palace down The Mall, on horseback. Directly behind the King in the Royal Procession ride the Royal Colonels— William, Prince of Wales (Welsh Guards), Prince Edward, Duke of Edinburgh (Scots Guards), Anne, Princess Royal (The Blues and Royals). In a carriage behind the procession ride Queen Camilla (Grenadier Guards) and Catherine, Princess of Wales (Irish Guards) – who are followed by the non-royal Colonels of Regiments (those of the Coldstream Guards and The Life Guards). Other officers of the Household Division and of the Royal Household follow, all mounted, including the Master of the Horse, the Major-General commanding the Household Division with his chief of staff and aide-de-camp, Silver Stick-in-Waiting, the regimental adjutants and a number of the King's equerries. As the King passes by the Colour of the unit being trooped, he salutes it.

As the King arrives, the Royal Standard is prepared to be released and flown from the roof of Horse Guards. The King then will alight at the Saluting Base to start the ceremonies.

The field officer commences the parade with the command: "Guards – Royal Salute – Present Arms!" and the national anthem (God Save The King) is played by the Household Division's Foot Guards Massed Bands, led by the senior director of music of the Household Division. Simultaneously, the Royal Standard is formally released and flies from the Horse Guards flagpole.

=== Inspection of the line ===
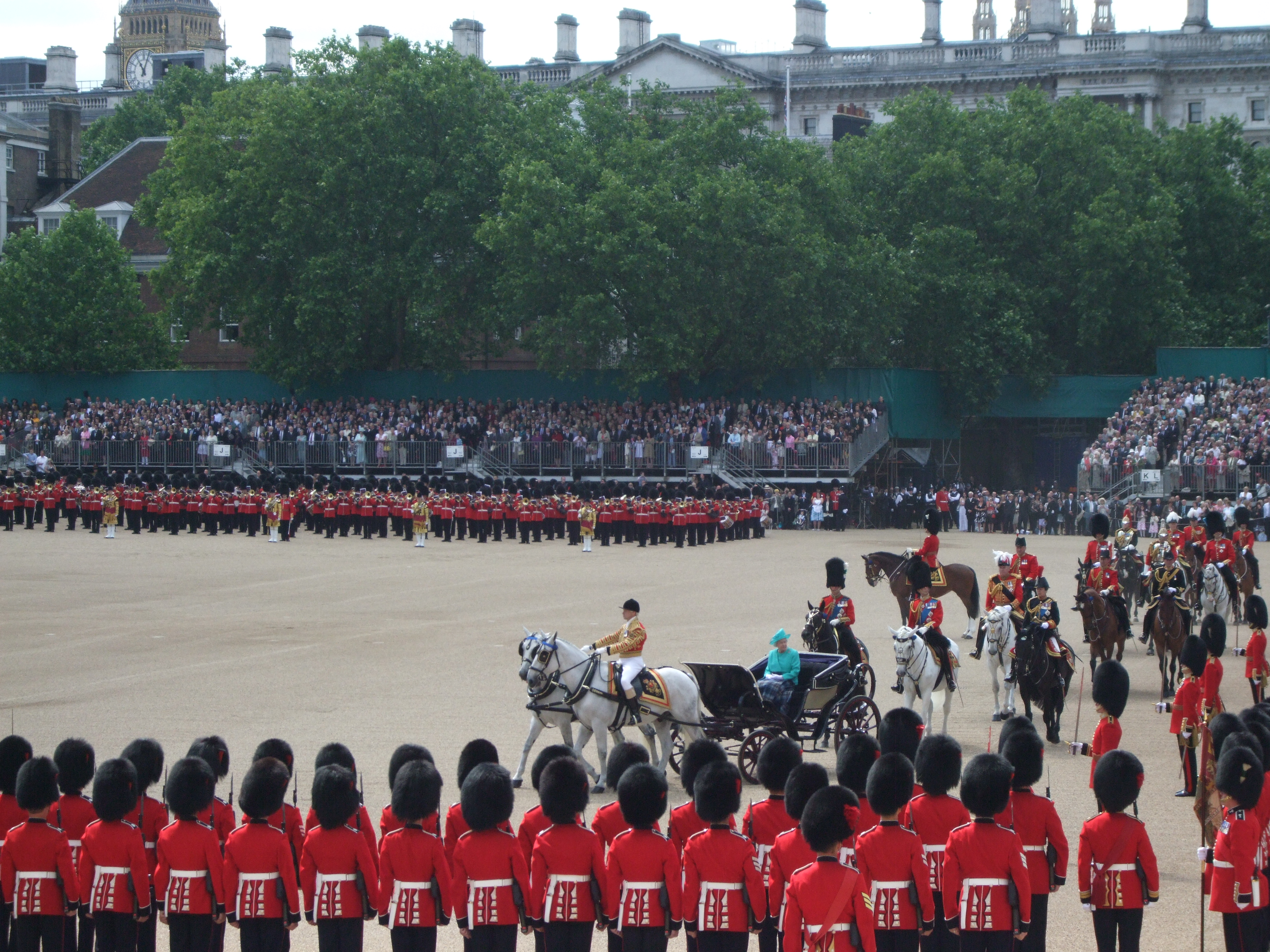
The Queen inspects the foot guards, the Royal Colonels following her. Foreground: backs of No. 6 Guard. Background: garden of 10 Downing Street and massed bands.

The King then rides off from the saluting base before and behind the long line of assembled guards, with the Royal Colonels following. BBC television commentaries every year emphasise the King's knowledge of the attributes of his guards, and single out 'steadiness' as a highly prized quality for a guardsman.

The accompanying marches always carry a flavour of the regiment whose colour is being trooped on the day, lending the royal inspection a unique atmosphere. For example, if the Welsh Guards are trooping their colour, the music will include their traditional regimental march, Men of Harlech. While the King passes the six companies of foot guards on his left, a slow march or air is played. Once the phaeton turns around the rear of No. 6 Guard, the music changes to a quick march. The King travels back up the line, passing the Household Cavalry and King's Troop stationed on his right, saluting the Sovereign's Standard of the Household Cavalry and the lead gun of the King's Troop in quick succession acknowledging their presence on the field. The inspection completed, the music ceases, and he is conveyed back to the saluting base.

=== Massed bands troop ===
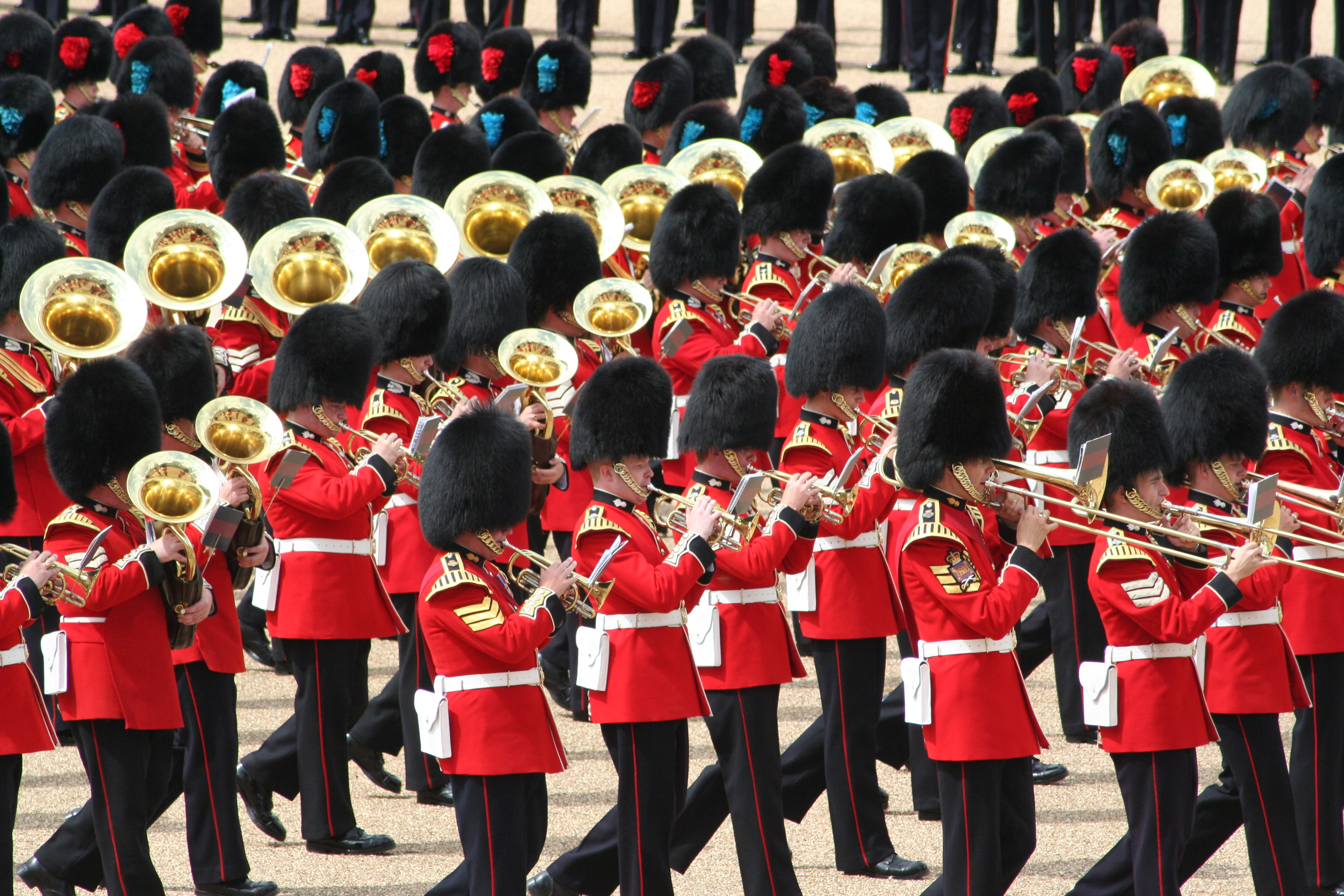
Massed bands of the foot guards, 16 June 2007.

With the monarch once more mounted at the saluting base, the command "Troop!" is given by the Field Officer. This is not to be confused with the trooping of the colour itself, which occurs later in the ceremony. Three strikes on a bass drum give the signal for the Massed Bands to start their march in the field.

The Guards, after standing to attention, change arms. Under the command of the Senior Drum Major, the Massed Bands march and countermarch on Horse Guards Parade in slow and quick time. The slow march music is traditionally the Waltz from Les Huguenots. During the quick march segment, a lone drummer from the Corps of Drums breaks away from the massed bands, marching to two paces to the right of No. 1 Guard to take his post while the band marches on, stopping just near the Colour Party.

The Trooping of the Colour phase of the ceremony is initiated by the lone drummer's eight-bar 'Drummer's Call', signalling the Captain of No. 1 Guard to cede his command to the Subaltern of No. 1 Guard and move to take his new position at the right of No. 2 Guard. It slopes arms, while the Field Officer directs the other companies present to change arms and stand at ease. The call having been sounded, the lone drummer returns to his position in the Massed Bands.

=== Escort for the Colour obtains the colour ===
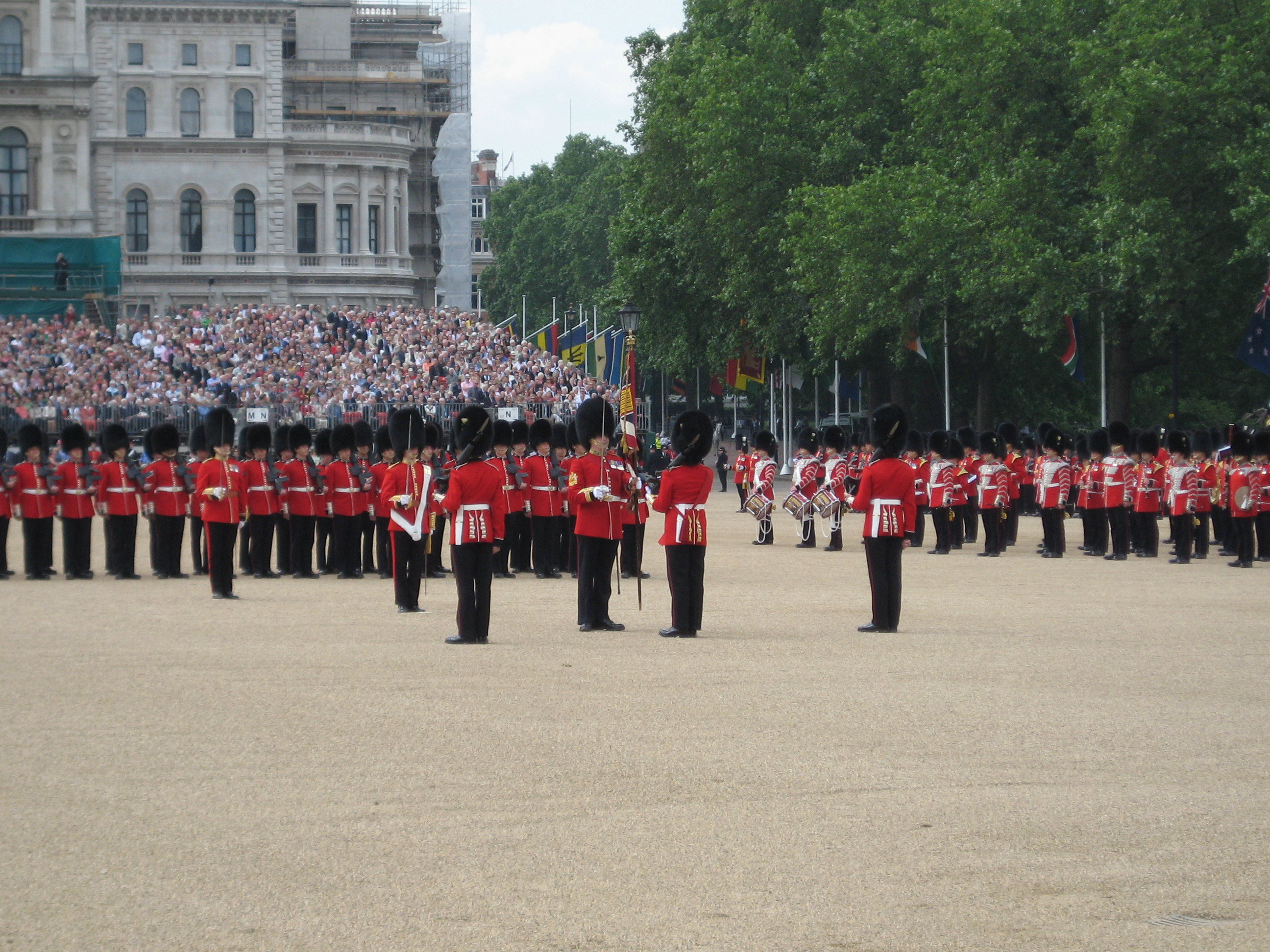
In the centre, holding his sword and the Colour, the Regimental Sgt-Major of No. 1 Guard. Behind him, wearing a white flag belt, the Ensign waits to receive the Colour, standing in front of No. 1 Guard. To the right, the Massed Bands.

As Escort for the Colour, No. 1 Guard performs the centrepiece of the parade.

An orderly takes the pace stick from the Regimental Sergeant-Major (RSM), positioned behind the Escort for the Colour, thus freeing the RSM to draw his sword – the only time a British Army infantry warrant officer ever does so on parade. The Subaltern then commands No. 1 Guard to move into close order, and then dresses it. Then, led by the Subaltern with the Ensign following, and with the Regimental Sergeant-Major marching behind the company, the Escort for the Colour quick marches onto the field to The British Grenadiers. (This tune is always used irrespective of which regiment's colour is being trooped, because the right flank of every battalion used to be a grenadier company.) A guardsman behind the colour party marches forward towards the Colour Sergeant of the colour party at the same time during the Escort approaching then hands over the rifle to the Colour Sergeant, salutes the colour, and leaves the parade ground. The Escort marks time while the Massed Bands 'clear the line of march', and move to the front of the Guards and mark time. Fifteen steps away from the Colour Party, the music halts and four paces later, the 'Escort for the Colour' halts in place, and is ordered to open ranks and dressed, followed by the Massed Bands making an about turn.

The guards are then called to attention and then change and slope arms under the direction of the Field Officer, while the Household Cavalry are also called to attention by the commander of the Sovereign's Escort.

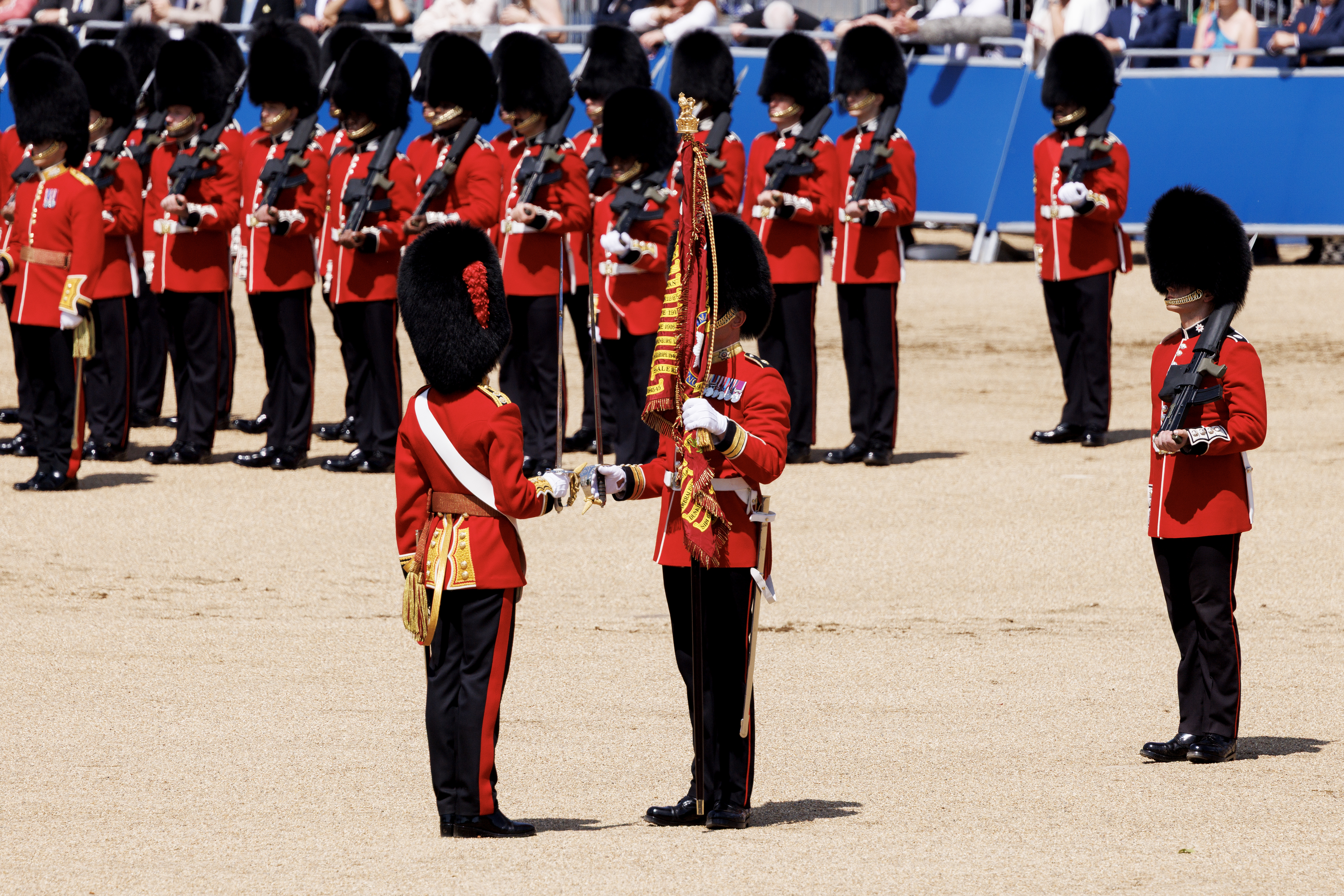
The Regimental Sergeant-Major presents the colour to the Ensign.

The RSM marches around to the front of the Escort and, followed by the Ensign, approaches the Colour Party. Having saluted the colour with his sword, the Sergeant-Major takes it from the Colour Sergeant, freeing him to change and then slope arms. The RSM turns, marches to the Ensign, and presents the colour to him. The Ensign salutes the colour with his sword, sheathes the sword without taking his eyes off the colour, and takes possession of it.

Having obtained their colour, No. 1 Guard (formerly known as 'Escort FOR the Colour') is now termed 'Escort TO the Colour'. By then, the massed bands, now with the line cleared, face front, with the Corps of Drums, pipe bands and the senior director of music leading.

=== Positioning of the Escort to troop its colour ===
To the first six bars of God Save the King, the Escort to the Colour presents arms. Simultaneously, turning outward at an angle of 45°, the NCOs (non-commissioned officers) at the four corners (or flanks) of the Escort port arms, described in annual television commentary and analysis as 'protection' for the colour.

The Escort to the Colour and Colour Party slope arms. The Colour Sergeant marches to the right and to the rear of the Escort. Once the Colour Party, Ensign, and Regimental Sergeant-Major have joined the Escort, the RSM repositions himself to the left of and behind the Escort. The Subaltern then orders the Escort to change arms and orders the slow march. The Massed Bands turn about.

==== Spinwheel of the massed bands ====
As the Escort to the Colour slow-marches down the field towards No. 6 Guard to begin their colour trooping, the massed bands perform their unique anti-clockwise 'spin-wheel' manoeuvre. This, a 90° turn in restricted space, is performed while playing the slow march Escort to the Colour.

The celebrated spinwheel is largely individual and instinctive:

A 'wheel' is not an easy manoeuvre with even a small body of troops, and with a block of 400 men, the normal wheel is impossible. The massed band therefore pivots on its own centre, so that certain outer ranks and files march long distances in a hurry while the centre and inner ranks loiter with extreme intent, or merely mark time. Yet others not only step sideways but backwards as well. This highly complex movement is called a 'spin-wheel', the details of which can be found in no drill book or manual of ceremonial. Its complexity defies description, and if the truth were known, many of the participants know not whither they go or, on arrival, how they got there. The spin-wheel is almost an art form, and each performance of it, although similar in essentials, is different in detail. Most of the performers are adjusting their actions to suit the needs of the spin-wheel of the moment, having adjusted their movements quite otherwise on other occasions.

Once the Escort reaches the edge of No. 6 Guard, the music stops, and the Field Officer in Brigade Waiting orders the entire parade (except the Escort) to present arms as the trooping proper starts. The music changes to The Grenadiers' Slow March.

=== Trooping the Colour through the ranks ===
To the strains of the Grenadiers' Slow March, the Escort to the Colour then troops the colour down the long line of Nos. 6-2 Guards. The colour itself is borne by the Ensign in front of the line of guards, but the ranks of the Escort interweave with their ranks. For Nos. 6-2 Guards, who maintain the 'present arms' position, the long trooping, especially on a hot day, requires stamina. (Note: When the colour passes the spectators, members of the British and foreign armed services, and military attachés of the diplomatic corps salute the colour, as is customary in the British Army.) As this is done the Massed Bands move back in slow time to their original places.

Eventually, the Escort arrives back at its original position as No. 1 Guard; from where it first marched off in quick time. Their Captain, who had temporarily ceded his command to the Subaltern, resumes his command over No. 1 Guard by ordering them to present arms, thus bringing the Escort back in line with Nos. 2-6 Guards. The entire parade is now ordered by the Field Officer to slope arms, thus concluding the trooping phase.

The trooping phase is followed by the march-past in slow and quick time of the foot guards and then the Household Cavalry and King's Troop, also in slow and quick time.

=== Preparing for the march-past ===
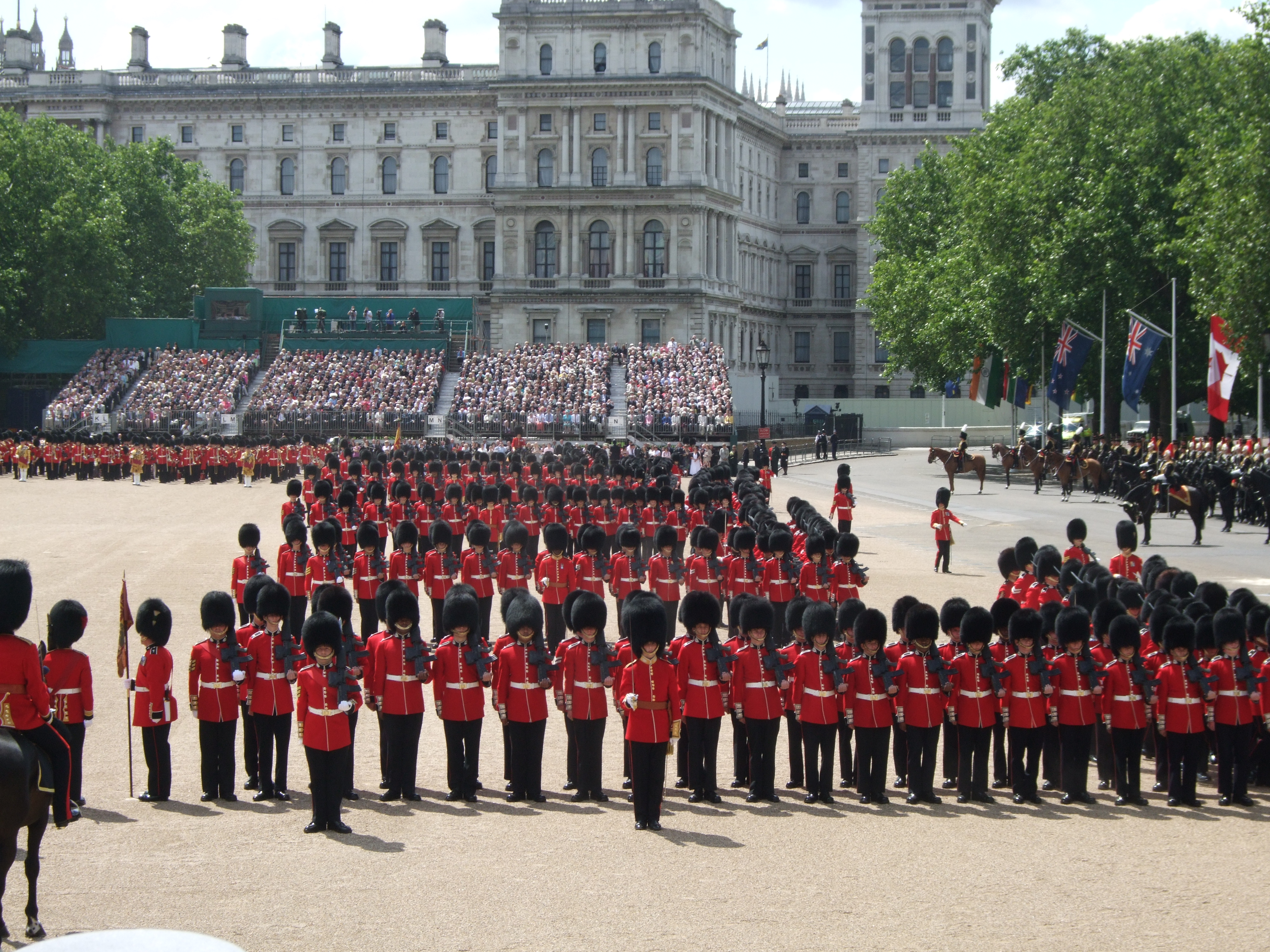
From front to back: Guards Nos. 5, 4, 3, 2, 1 in ranks of two. Background at left: massed bands.

The Field Officer gives the command, "Officers, take post". Nos. 1 to 5 Guard then 'retire', about-turning and right-forming into review formation, following which the Adjutant commands "Guides, steady", giving signal to the company guides to resume their positions. Nos. 1 to 5 Guard then about-turn again as the Corps of Drums play. Since No. 6 Guard is already standing at right angles to the other five companies, it does not need to execute this movement, but instead it moves close-order position then to the right in threes after Nos. 1 to 5 Guards turn back to advance position. (Note: Also, as No. 6 Guard is always formed on the left of the line by the Coldstream Guards if present, by tradition they do not recognise the command to 'retire'.)

Once intervals are established, the Field Officer salutes the King and informs him that the foot guards are ready to march past, then after turning about, commands, "Guards will march past in slow and quick time... Slow march!" No. 6 Guard will then left turn to be advance and then form two ranks on marching after the parade has started to execute the slow march.

=== Foot guards march past in slow and quick time ===
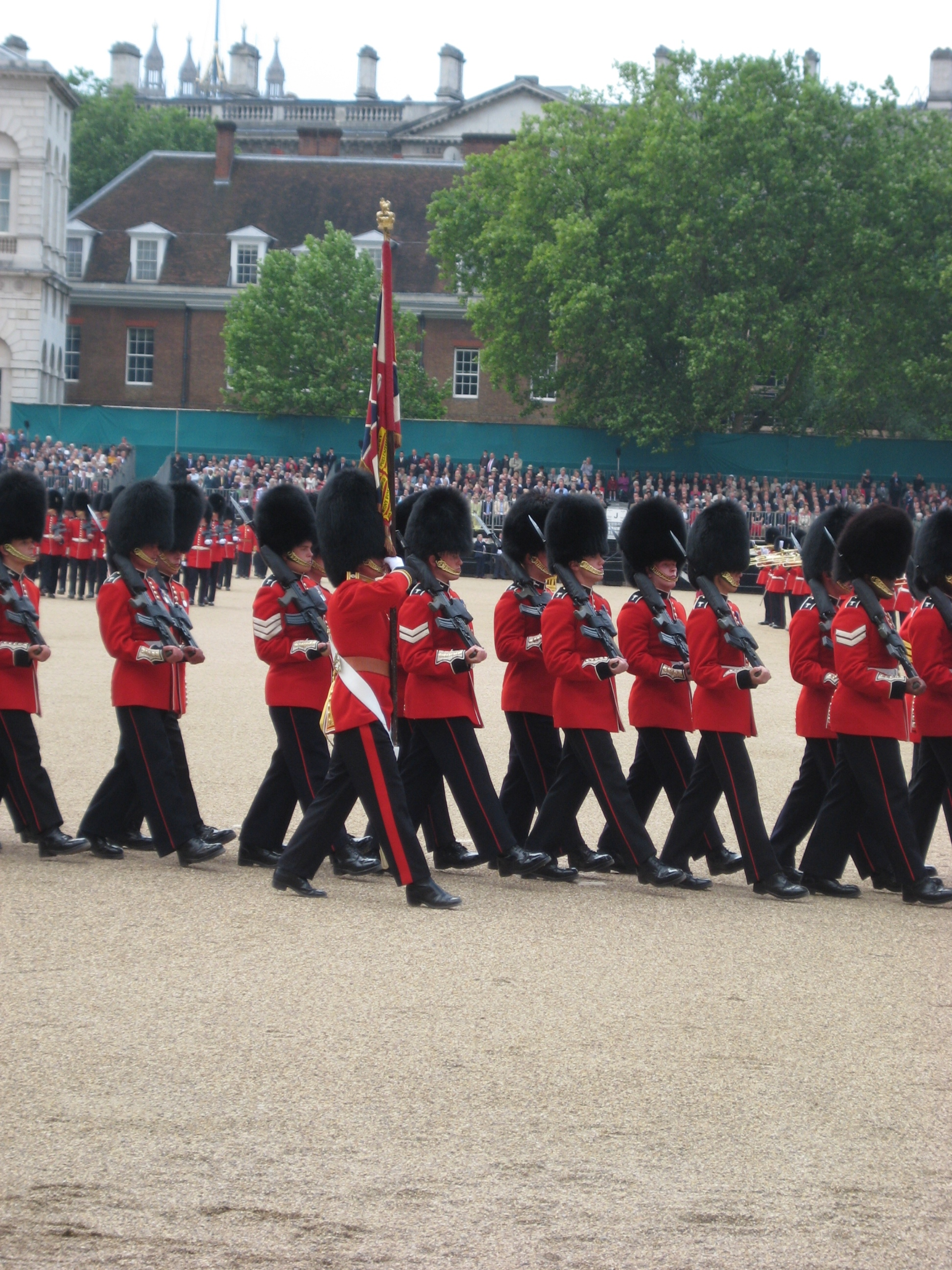
Footguards march past in Slow Time at the Colonel's Review in 2008.

No. 1 Guard; the Escort, leads the six companies for two circuits of Horse Guards Parade, saluting the King as they pass. The corners of the field are negotiated with the complex Left Form manoeuvre. Commands of "Change direction – left!" are then followed by the Left Guide (or Right Guide) of each Guard signalling "Right Sir!" to the Captain that the company has reached the position, the Captain will immediately orders "Left...Form!"

At the end of both the slow and quick march-past, the Field Officer rides out to salute the King with his sword, telling him that His Majesty's Guards have ended their march-past.

==== Slow march-past ====
Neutral slow marches start and conclude this section as the Massed Bands march into the centre of the field to take their places. The guards are preceded past the saluting base by the Field Officer and the Major of the Parade, who salute the King with their swords and eyes right.

To the strains of their regimental slow marches, each of Nos. 1-6 Guards passes before the King with their eyes right, their regimental officers saluting with swords. The leading company, No. 1 Guard; the Escort to the Colour, has a particular honour. The Ensign lowers the colour; the 'flourish'. The King acknowledges it with a bow of the head, and the Royal Colonels salute the colour. Once past the saluting base, the colour is raised again; the 'recover', and "eyes front" is ordered.

Each company's salute is acknowledged by the King and the Royal Colonels.

==== Quick march-past ====
For this circuit, the colour is at the rear of the Escort (No. 1 Guard), protected by the Colour Party. Their regimental quick marches are played as each guard passes before the King with eyes right. (Note: When the Scots or Irish Guards troop their colours, the regimental pipers move to the front of the massed bands for the march past in quick time. If there are pipers present when another regiment troops, then the pipers remain at the rear of the massed band.) However, this being a quick march, the officers do not salute with swords, but only with the eyes right instead. As with the slow march-past, neutral marches start and conclude this section, and the Colour is marched on past the saluting base as the King and Queen and Royal Colonels salute it.

The massed bands, led by the Corps of Drums and the pipes and drums, march away to allow the mounted bands on to the ground. By then, the foot guards have ended their march, and are now back in place and dressed.

The march-past ends with the same command from the Field Officer with which it started: "Officers, take post!"

=== Mounted troops ride past ===
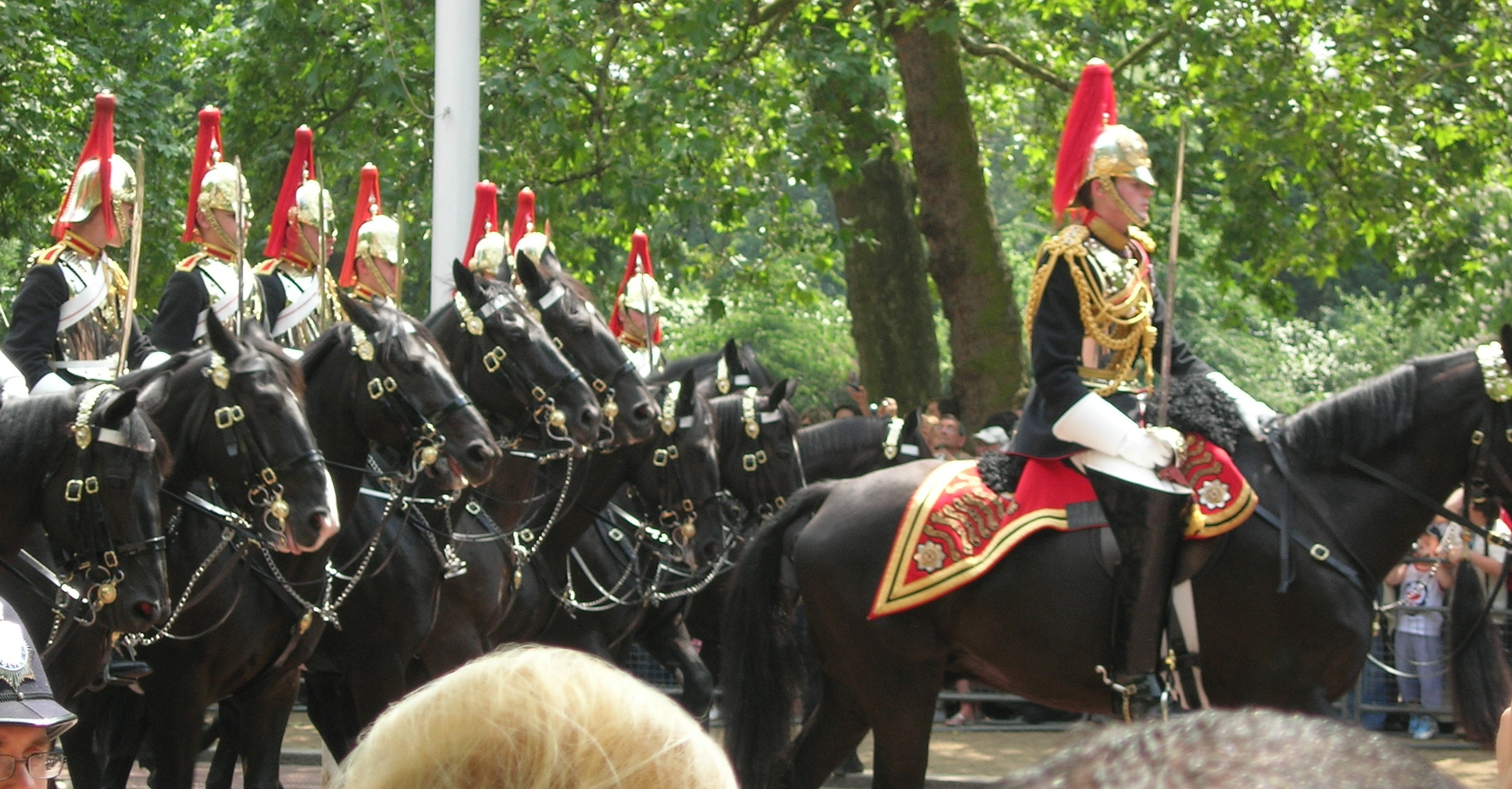
Blues and Royals, one of the two regiments of the Household Cavalry, in their characteristic red plumes and dark blue uniforms.

The Mounted Band of the Household Cavalry in state dress, led by the two drum horses (Note: The kettle-drum players must manoeuvre the reins of the drum horses with their feet.) representing the two constituent regiments of the Household Cavalry, and the Director of Music of the Household Cavalry, ride slowly on to the field, traditionally to the tune Preobrajensky.

It is the turn of Household Cavalry and King's Troop to complete two circuits of Horse Guards Parade. For the horses, slow and quick time correspond to a walk-march and a sitting-trot, respectively. Since 1997, the mounted contingent is led by the commander of the King's Troop and then by the Sovereign's Escort commander.

In both turns of the ride past, the Foot Guards present arms. The order of march past follows the arrangement of the Sovereign's Escort for the year.

==== Walk-march ====
Salutes are again given to the King, and returned by him, the Queen, and the Royal Colonels to the colours as they pass by.

The Royal Horse Artillery (aka 'King's Troop'), marching to the Royal Artillery Slow March and then March from "Aida", is first, taking precedence over all other units when on parade with its guns. When the King's Troop passes the saluting base, the King acknowledges the leading gun as the Colour.

The Life Guards, in red jackets and white plumes, are next, followed by The Blues and Royals, in blue jackets and red plumes. Officers salute their sabres on the eyes right in this segment. The sequence of regimental marches is: Life Guards' Slow March, followed by Blues and Royals' Slow March, and then The Royals.

Riding at the rear of the Household Cavalry are the two regimental farriers, carrying their glinting axes and flanked by a soldier of each regiment. Rather than the usual regimental white plume and red tunic, the Life Guards farrier is conspicuous by their black plume and blue tunic.

The two Household Cavalry regiments take turns to parade, and the job of parading the King's Cavalry Standard of either of the two regiments alternates yearly between the Life Guards and the Blues and Royals. As the standard passes by the monarch, it is flourished (dipped), and then recovered.

==== Trot-past ====
A state trumpeter of either of the two Household Cavalry regiments plays The Trot to signal the beginning of the sitting trot-past. The Keel Row is traditionally played, and much dust is raised by the horses. Both the King's Troop's lead gun and the King's Cavalry Standard (not dipped) are trotted past the King and the royal colonels, who are saluted with eyes right.

As the trot-past ends the mounted band salutes the King, the drum-horse riders crossing their drumsticks above their heads. They then proceed back to the east side of Horse Guards Parade and halt in place.

=== Preparing for march-off ===
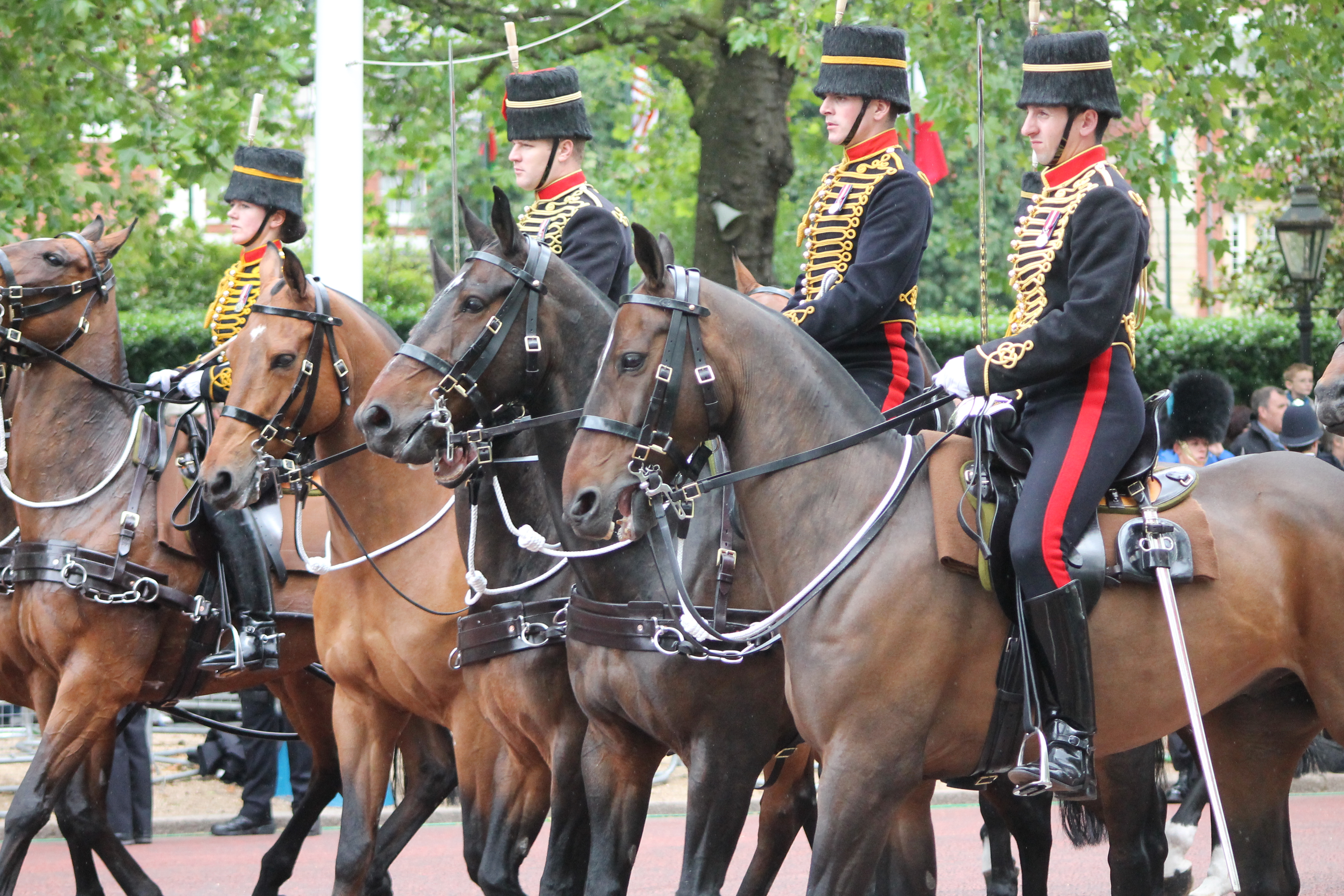
Members of King's Troop, Royal Horse Artillery, returning along The Mall.

Their director of music turns inwards on his horse, signalling that the Household Cavalry and the King's Troop have completed their march-past.

During the final Royal Salute, the Colour of No. 1 Guard is lowered to the ground. Forming divisions once more, accompanied by the Corps of Drums, the guards prepare to march off, and the Household Cavalry and the King's Troop leave the field. The King's Troop, Royal Horse Artillery, proceeds up The Mall to Green Park to perform the royal 41-gun salute.

The Field Officer rides to the saluting base with the words "Your Majesty's guards are ready to march off", and the monarch nods assent. The RSM of the Escort returns his sword into his scabbard as an orderly returns to him his pace stick. The Field Officer commands the guards to dress left, and the left guide of the Escort steps out four paces to the left to be visible by all guards, extending his left arm. The guards eyes left, and dress accordingly. The left guide then drops his arm, which signals the guards to silently eyes front as the left guide resumes his place in the Escort.

The final drill command from the Field Officer at Trooping the Colour is: "To your duties - by the left - quick march!"

=== Marching off ===
Led by the massed bands, the King places himself at the head of his foot guards. The entire parade of 1,000 soldiers and 400 musicians marches up The Mall towards Buckingham Palace. The Markers then march off the grounds carrying the regimental company Colours on the marker flags. The King's Troop and the HAC, now in place, get ready to commence firing their respective gun salutes during the Royal Family's arrival at the palace. At the same time, the old and new King's Guards, now performing the Changing of the Guard in the palace forecourt at the same time as the ceremony being done, also prepare for the royal carriages' arrival, and to salute the King on horseback when he arrives.

== After the ceremony ==
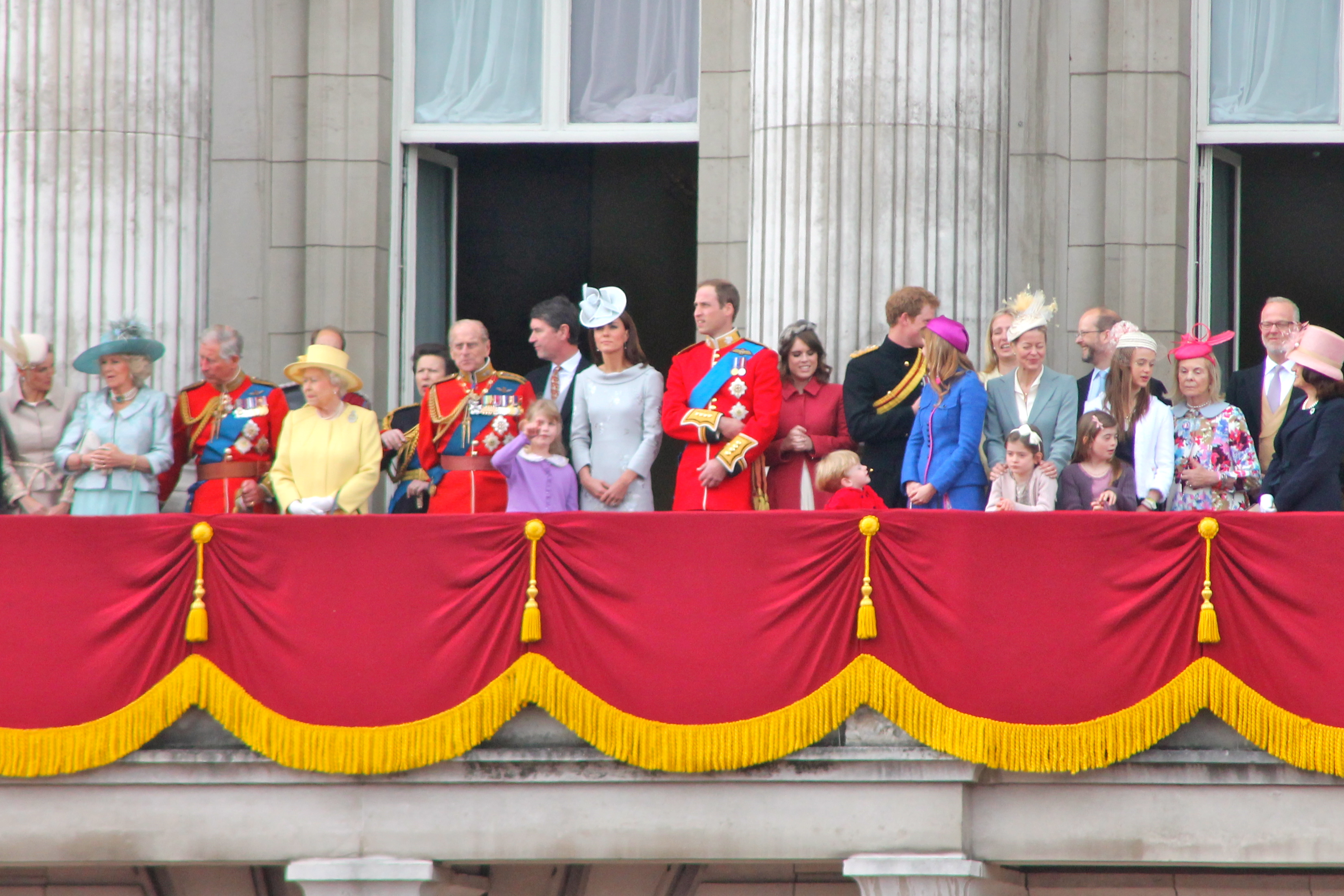
Balcony appearance by the royal family following the 2012 Trooping the Colour.

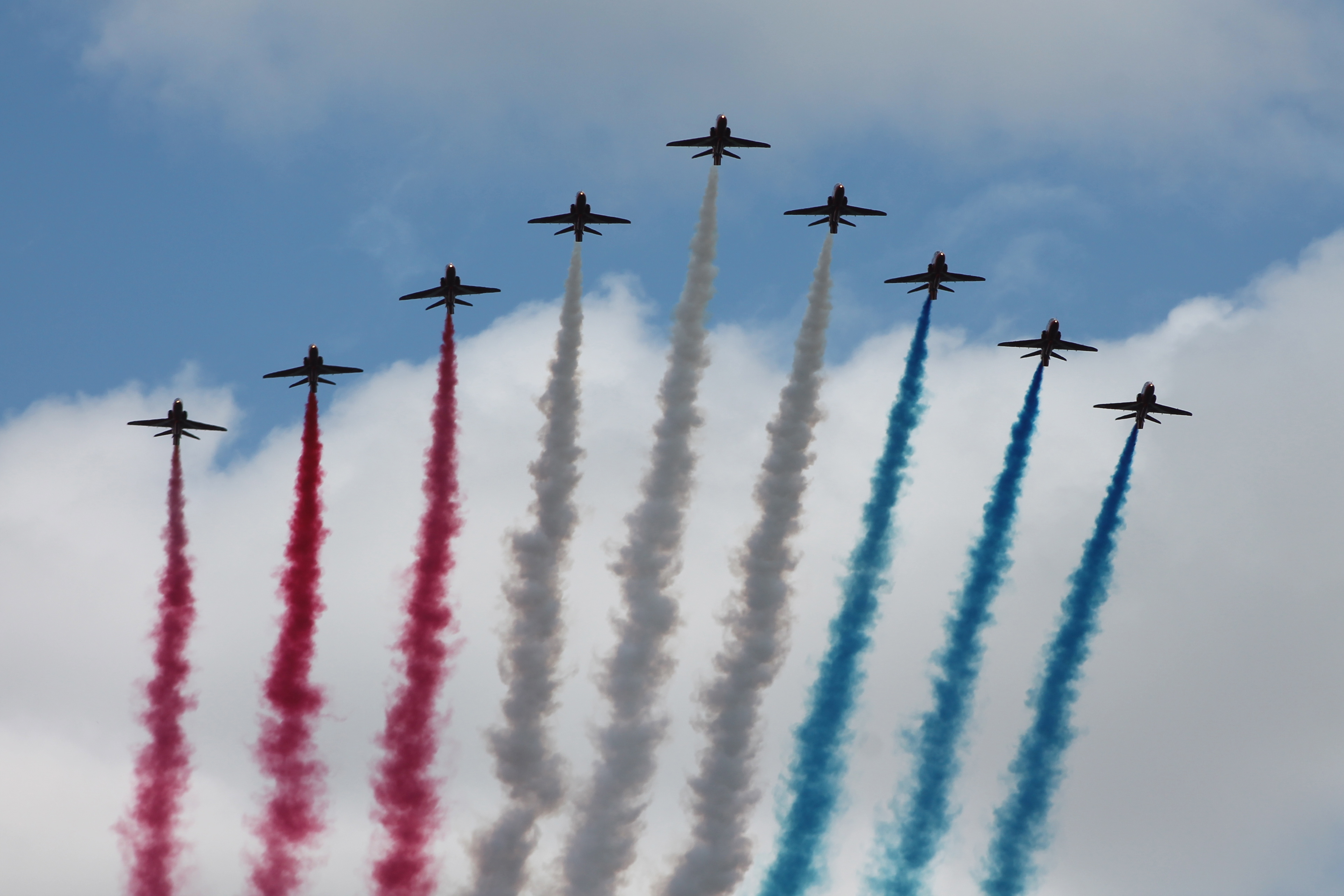
Red Arrows flypast after the ceremony, 15 June 2013.

When the King returns to Buckingham Palace, the first division of the Escort to the Colour forms into two detachments of the new guard and enters the forecourt, opposite the old guard; but unlike the usual Changing of the Guard, the Regimental Sergeant Major participates in the ceremony. The remainder of the guards perform a march-past outside the gateway, in quick time instead of the usual slow time, with the King, positioned before the central gateway, receiving their salute. As the guards march past, their regimental marches are played by the massed and mounted bands respectively. The rest of the Royal Family observes the march-past from the balcony.

The King passes into the palace between the Old and New Guards, with both guards saluting him and the Royal Colonels. The usual semi-daily Changing of the Guard continues on the forecourt of the palace.

The gun salutes begin on the arrival of the King at Buckingham Palace, with the King's Troop firing a 41-gun royal salute in Green Park and the Honourable Artillery Company firing a 62-gun royal salute from the Tower of London grounds.

Finally, the King and the royal family on the palace balcony witness a flypast by the Royal Air Force (RAF), often featuring the Battle of Britain Memorial Flight (BBMF) and the Red Arrows. This is once again followed by the National Anthem and in special years, a feu de joie, followed by the shouting of the three cheers to the King on behalf of the entire Household Division.

== Regimental marches of the foot guards ==
Below are links to words and music of the regimental marches of the five foot guards regiments.

Slow marches

- Grenadier Guards: The March from Scipio, composed for the First Guards (Grenadier Guards) by George Frideric Handel. It was presented by Handel to the Regiment before its inclusion in his opera Scipione, which was first performed in 1726. (The title and composer's name are anglicised by the Regiment.)
- Coldstream Guards: Figaro (the tune is Non piu andrai from Mozart's Le nozze di Figaro)
- Scots Guards: The Garb of Old Gaul
- Irish Guards: Let Erin Remember
- Welsh Guards: Men of Harlech.

Quick marches

- Grenadier Guards: The British Grenadiers
- Coldstream Guards: Milanollo. This march was composed by J. V. Hamm in honour of a pair of violin-playing child prodigy sisters, Teresa and Maria Milanollo, who performed in England in the mid-19th century during their extensive European tours.
- Scots Guards: Hielan' Laddie
- Irish Guards: Saint Patrick's Day whose lyrics were the poem 'Pulse of an Irishman' (Ludwig van Beethoven composed an arrangement of the march as part of a song cycle of Scots and Irish tunes).
- Welsh Guards: The Rising of the Lark.

== List of regiments trooping their colour ==
Since only one colour can be trooped down the ranks at a time, each year a single battalion of the five Foot Guards regiments is selected to troop its colours.

Year	Battalion	Regiment	Colonel	Comments
2001	2nd Battalion (Note: 2nd Battalion represented by Nijmegen Company)	Grenadier Guards	Prince Philip, Duke of Edinburgh	Non-participating guards: Irish and Welsh Guards; Showered by heavy rain 50th anniversary of Elizabeth's first Trooping acting in behalf of her father King George VI; It was the final Birthday Parade of Queen Elizabeth The Queen Mother before her death on 30 March 2002.
2002	1st Battalion	Scots Guards	Prince Edward, Duke of Kent	Held as part of the national celebrations of the Golden Jubilee of Elizabeth II. Last time Corps of Drums of the 1st Battalion Scots Guards were present before being disbanded to move into their permanent combat role. Non-participating guards: Irish and Welsh Guards.
2003	1st Battalion	Grenadier Guards	Prince Philip, Duke of Edinburgh	
2004	1st Battalion	Grenadier Guards	Prince Philip, Duke of Edinburgh	Inkerman Company trooping the colour. Non-participating guards: Welsh Guards.
2005	1st Battalion	Irish Guards	James Hamilton, 5th Duke of Abercorn	Non-participating guards: Welsh Guards.
2006	1st Battalion	Welsh Guards	Charles, Prince of Wales	Non-participating guards: Irish Guards.
2007	2nd Battalion (Note: 2nd Battalion represented by No. 7 Company)	Coldstream Guards	Sir Hugh Rose	Non-participating guards: Irish Guards and the 1st Battalion, Coldstream Guards, which were originally scheduled to troop their Colour but an operational deployment prevented this.
2008	1st Battalion	Welsh Guards	Charles, Prince of Wales	Non-participating regiment: Irish Guards.
2009	1st Battalion	Irish Guards	Sir Sebastian Roberts	Non-participating guards: Welsh Guards; First trooping to feature 7 foot guards since 1993.
2010	1st Battalion	Grenadier Guards	Prince Philip, Duke of Edinburgh	Non-participant guards: Irish and Welsh Guards.
2011	1st Battalion	Scots Guards	Prince Edward, Duke of Kent	First time a battalion not stationed as part of London District has trooped. 60th anniversary of Elizabeth's first Trooping acting in behalf of her father King George VI; Non-participating guards: Irish Guards.
2012	1st Battalion	Coldstream Guards	Lt Gen Sir James Bucknall	First trooping of the battalion since 1999. Held as part of the nationwide celebrations of the Diamond Jubilee of Elizabeth II; Non-participating guards: Welsh Guards.
2013	1st Battalion	Welsh Guards	Charles, Prince of Wales	Non-participating guards: Irish Guards.
2014	2nd Battalion	Grenadier Guards	Prince Philip, Duke of Edinburgh	Non-participating guards: Irish and Welsh Guards.
2015	1st Battalion	Welsh Guards	Charles, Prince of Wales	Parade was held on Saturday, 13 June 2015. Coincided with the Welsh Guards centennial year of foundation Non-participating guards: Irish Guards.
2016	2nd Battalion	Coldstream Guards	Lt Gen Sir James Bucknall	Parade was held on Saturday, 11 June 2016, part of the national celebrations for the official 90th birthday of the Queen. Non-participating guards: Irish and Welsh Guards.
2017	1st Battalion	Irish Guards	Prince William, Duke of Cambridge	Parade was held on Saturday, 17 June 2017, part of the national celebrations of the Sapphire Jubilee of the accession of the Queen. Non-participating guards: Welsh Guards. 14th row/rank was added in the massed bands.
2018	1st Battalion	Coldstream Guards	Lt Gen Sir James Bucknall	Parade was held on 9 June 2018. The Queen was flanked at the Saluting Base by the Duke of Kent, for the 96-year-old Duke of Edinburgh who withdrew during 2017 from royal public duties. Non-participating guards: Irish and Welsh Guards.
2019	1st Battalion	Grenadier Guards	Prince Andrew, Duke of York	Parade was held on 8 June 2019. Coincided with the centennial year of the conclusion of the First World War and the anniversary of the Victory Parade of 1919, as well as the historic Hyde Park trooping of that year, the largest ever held. Non-participating Guards: Irish and Welsh Guards.
2020	1st Battalion	Welsh Guards	Charles, Prince of Wales	Public event cancelled due to the coronavirus pandemic, reformatted as a private parade at Windsor Castle.
2021	2nd Battalion (Note: 2nd Battalion represented by F Company)	Scots Guards	Prince Edward, Duke of Kent	Public event cancelled due to the coronavirus outbreak, reformatted as a private televised parade of the Household Division at Windsor Castle. Marked the official 95th birthday of the Queen. 70th anniversary of Elizabeth's first Trooping acting in behalf of her father King George VI. The Queen was joined by the Duke of Kent for the salute.
2022	1st Battalion	Irish Guards	Prince William, Duke of Cambridge	Held as part of the national celebrations for the Platinum Jubilee of Elizabeth II. The Prince of Wales took salute on behalf of the Queen in Horse Guards, while the Queen saluted the parading formations in Buckingham Palace. Non-participating Guards: Welsh Guards. The parade returns after the COVID-19 pandemic.
2023	1st Battalion	Welsh Guards	William, Prince of Wales	First for King Charles III to take the salute as sovereign and the commander in chief of the Armed Forces, while also marking the Household Division's appreciation for the Coronation of Charles III and Camilla. The King when he was Prince of Wales was Colonel of the Welsh Guards from Saint David's Day 1975 to September 2022. Queen Camilla took her place as Colonel of the Grenadier Guards, William, Prince of Wales as Colonel of the Welsh Guards, and Catherine, Princess of Wales as the Colonel of the Irish Guards. First parade since 1988 with all five Guards regiments participating. Additionally, 1st Battalion, London Guards, the foot guards' reserve unit, served as street liners for the first time, with their colonel, Prince Edward, Duke of Edinburgh, riding in the parade.
2024	2nd Battalion (Note: 2nd Battalion represented by No. 9 Company)	Irish Guards	Catherine, Princess of Wales (Colonel's Review salute taken by Lt Gen Sir James Bucknall)	First time that colour of 2nd Battalion, Irish Guards trooped. First time the Princess of Wales took the Salute as Colonel of the Irish Guards. All five Guards regiments participating.
2025	2nd Battalion	Coldstream Guards	Lt Gen Sir James Bucknall	First time that the Coldstream Guards trooped their colour in front of the King. 2025 marks the 375th Anniversary of the Coldstream Guards. Royals in uniform wore black armbands and a one minute silence was held after the King's inspection in order to pay respect to the 53 British citizens who died in the crash of Air India Flight 171. Non-participating Guards: Welsh Guards.
2026	1st Battalion	Grenadier Guards	Queen Camilla (Colonel's Review salute taken by Lt Gen Sir James Bucknall)	First time that the Grenadier Guards trooped their colour in front of the King. 2026 marked the 370th Anniversary of the formation of the Grenadier Guards. First time that the Royal Navy and Royal Air Force provided street-liners. Non-participating guards: Scots and Welsh Guards.
2027	2nd Battalion	Scots Guards	Prince Edward, Duke of Edinburgh	First time that the Scots Guards will troop their colour in front of the King.
Year	Battalion	Regiment	Colonel	Comments

The 2nd Battalions of the Grenadier Guards, Coldstream Guards, and Scots Guards are in 'suspended animation'; they are represented in the parade by three incremental companies. In 2022, two new incremental companies were formed following the conversion of the 1st Battalion, Irish Guards to the specialised infantry role. These new units, No. 9 Company and No. 12 Company, continue the traditions of the 2nd Battalion, Irish Guards, which was placed in suspended animation in 1947.

The number of soldiers participating in Trooping the Colour in London has declined over the years due to defence budget cuts in Household Division battalions, as well as the battalions' commitments to military and peacekeeping operations overseas. (Note: For example, the Welsh Guards, prior to trooping their colour in 2006 had returned from Iraq, and were scheduled to redeploy to Bosnia later that year.) This gives some of the units little time to practice ceremonial functions. However, the format of the ceremony has remained the same over the centuries following routines of old battle formations used in the era of musket warfare. The 1988 parade was the last until 2023 to have all five regiments in participation, and in 1993, the parade was reduced from eight guards companies to six companies.

== Associated events ==
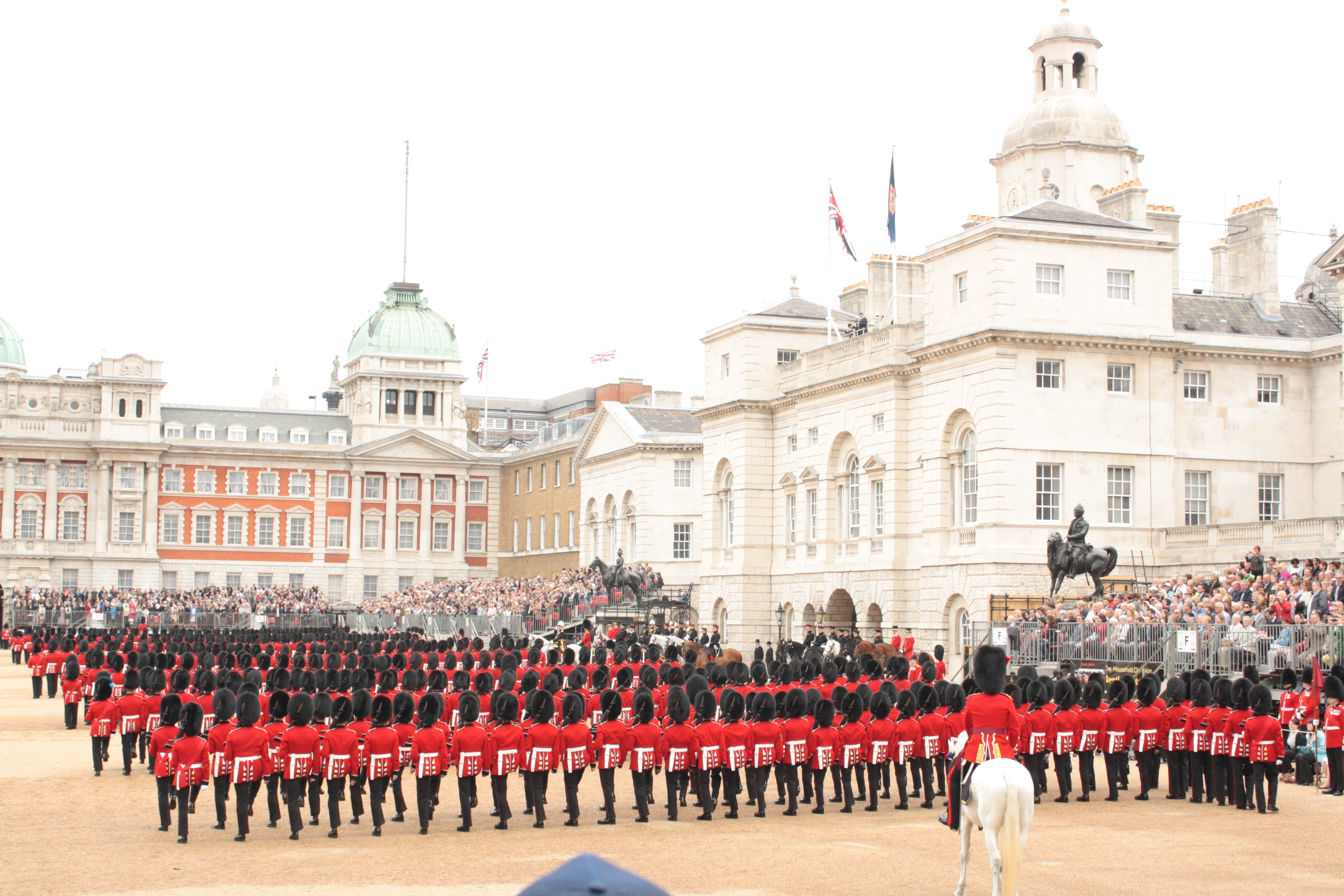
The Colonel's Review in 2012.

Before the Sovereign's Birthday Parade, the Trooping the Colour parade is conducted twice in full on the two preceding Saturdays, which serve as dress rehearsals for the main event.

=== The Major General's Review ===
Held two Saturdays beforehand, the parade is identical to the Sovereign's Birthday Parade, with the exception that there are no soldiers lining The Mall. The salute is taken by the Major-General commanding the Household Division.

=== The Colonel's Review ===
Held on the Saturday beforehand, the salute is taken by the Royal Colonel of the regiment whose colour is being trooped. This time, the parade includes 250 Guardsmen who line the route along The Mall.

== Trooping the Colour in other Commonwealth countries and territories ==
=== Australia ===
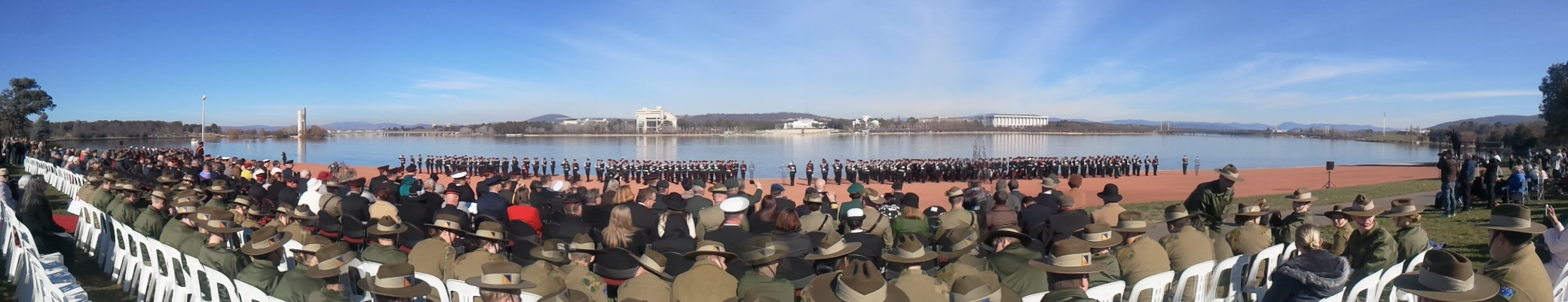
The RMC Duntroon Trooping the Colour ceremony, 6 June 2015, at Anzac Parade. Present include the Governor-General of Australia, the Chief of the Defence Force, the Chief of Army, the Chief of Navy, and the Commandant, RMC.

In Australia, the Trooping the King's Colour takes place annually on the King's Birthday Holiday by the staff cadets of Royal Military College, Duntroon, in Canberra, formerly at the RMC parade grounds and now at Rod Point at the shores of Lake Burley Griffin. The Queen's colour was trooped there for the first time on the Queen's Birthday Parade in 1956, a practice which has continued since then. Colours were first presented to the Corps of Staff Cadets by King George VI when, as Duke of York, he visited Australia in 1927. These colours are now lodged in the college's Patterson Hall. Colours were again presented by Queen Elizabeth II on 10 May 1988 and most recently on 22 October 2011 during a brief visit to Australia, coinciding with RMC Duntroon's centenary year.

The Champion Company of the Corps of Staff Cadets is named after the Sovereign's Company, and it carries the Queen Elizabeth II's banner, which was first presented to the Corps of Staff Cadets by Queen Elizabeth The Queen Mother on 26 February 1958. The Sovereign's Company is entitled to carry the banner on all ceremonial parades as well as escorting the Queen's colour during the Trooping the Colour. The Governor-General of Australia, being the King's representative in the Commonwealth, is the reviewing officer of the parade, and since the move to Rod Field has been attended by the public as well.

=== Bermuda ===
The Trooping of the Colour in Hamilton, Bermuda is held on Front Street by troops of the Royal Bermuda Regiment (who make up No. 1 Guard), as well as supporting units of the Bermuda Police Service and the Bermuda Junior Leaders (RBR). The presiding officer of the ceremony is the Governor of Bermuda, who inspects the units at the start. At the conclusion of the ceremony, the guards conduct a 'Feu de joie', followed by a 21-gun salute and three cheers to the Sovereign.

=== Canada ===
In Canada, the Trooping the Colour ceremony on Parliament Hill takes place, with a trooping of the King's Colour, only for the King, members of the royal family, the governor general, or a lieutenant-governor, on Remembrance Day, or in honour of the King's Birthday, on Victoria Day. Trooping the Colour ceremonies have also taken place at Rideau Hall. New colours may also be trooped when they are presented. Colours are also trooped during unit anniversaries. In Ottawa, should any of the above be absent for the ceremony, the salute is taken by the Minister of National Defence and the Chief of the Defence Staff, and the Regimental Colour is trooped instead. The ceremony was first performed on a national scale in Canada in 1939, during the royal tour that year. Earlier versions of the event were held in relation to the regiment, with one of the first to occur since the Confederation of Canada taking place over two weeks later on 18 July 1867, with The Royal Canadian Regiment trooping on the Champ de Mars in Montreal. The first major ceremony since 1939 took place in 1953 during the coronation day ceremonies in front of Centre Block that included the Trooping of the Colour in front of Governor General Vincent Massey. In 1958, it became a regular event on the 1 July holiday.

==== List of regiments trooping the colour in Canada ====
- The Royal Canadian Regiment, 2002
- The Argyll and Sutherland Highlanders of Canada, Hamilton, Ontario, 2002
- Governor General's Foot Guards
- The Canadian Grenadier Guards
- The Governor General's Horse Guards
- The Canadian Guards – disbanded (reduced to nil strength) 1970
- The Princess Louise Fusiliers
- The Calgary Highlanders trooped their new Queen's Colour when it was presented by their Colonel-in-Chief, Queen Elizabeth II, in June 1990.
- The Grey and Simcoe Foresters, Owen Sound, Ontario, 1983
- The Toronto Scottish Regiment (Queen Elizabeth The Queen Mother's Own)
- The Lorne Scots (Peel, Dufferin and Halton Regiment), 2001, 2006, 2016
- The Black Watch (Royal Highland Regiment) of Canada, 1987, 2012

=== Ghana ===
In Ghana, the traditional Trooping the Colour ceremony is held annually during the Independence Day celebrations on 6 March. The Escort for the Colour is mounted by the Ghana Army, and has the task of retrieving the ceremonial colours of the Army, Navy, and Air Force, alongside the Flag of Ghana. After the escort presents arms to God Bless Our Homeland Ghana, the Escort for the Colour then marches off to the tune of the British grenadier guards in slow time. The ceremony takes place on Black Star Square, where the national salute is taken by the President of Ghana in his, or her, position as commander in chief of the Ghana Armed Forces (GAF). Musical accompaniment is provided by the combined massed bands of the Ghana Armed Forces Central Band and school marching bands.

=== Kenya ===
Kenya is one of three African countries that still practices the traditional British ceremony of Trooping the Colour.

This takes place every 12 December on Jamhuri Day (the day when Kenya became an independent nation and later a republic), but unlike the British one, all the three services of the Kenya Defence Forces (KDF) takes part in the Trooping the Colour. The service branch whose battalion is trooping the colour provides number one and number two guards.

The ceremony normally begins at 11:30 after the arrival of the President of Kenya, who takes the national salute as the national anthem and the anthem of the East African Community are played by the massed bands. After finishing his inspection of the parade, the bands play a slow march followed with a quick march, during which the lone drummer then breaks away to take his position beside number one guard to play the drummers call, signalling the officers of No.1 Guard to take positions to receive the colour, and the Guards' RSM removing his pace stick and then unsheathing his sword. The Escort for the Colour then marches off to collect the colour as the massed Kenya Defence Forces band play either The British Grenadiers, or a locally composed march, after which the Escort halts in position. After the hand over, and as the Escort presents arms, the first verse of the Kenya national anthem is played, then the Escort to the colour marches off in a slow march to the tune of The Grenadiers' Slow March. The first tune normally played during the march in slow time is always By land and sea.

=== Malaysia ===
Also part of the Commonwealth, Malaysia performs Trooping the Colours every first Saturday in June, days after the official birthday of the Yang di-Pertuan Agong, the elected Malaysian king, on the first Monday, in front of the Yang di-Pertuan Agong, the Raja Permaisuri Agong, the Prime Minister of Malaysia, the Deputy Prime Minister, and other officials of the government, and officers of the Malaysian Armed Forces, of which the King is the Commander-in-Chief as prescribed by the Malaysian Constitution of 1957 as amended.

The Malaysian trooping follows the publication of an Honours List for the King's Birthday on the same week. It also incorporates many elements of the British Trooping ceremony, including a Royal Procession before and after the parade, The Sovereign's Escort provided by the Royal Armored Corps, Saluting Base at Merdeka Square, National Heroes' Square, or at the Stadium Merdeka, Royal Inspection, the duties of Field Officer, Major of the Parade and Adjutant officers and the NCO duties of Regt. Sergeant Majors and Colour Sergeants, the Royal Salute, 21-gun salutes by the Royal Artillery Regiment, and flypasts (flying the Malaysian flag and the flags of the Armed forces). It is conducted in Malay and includes prayers, in the Islamic traditions of the Malaysian Armed Forces. Motorised vehicles are used in the Royal Procession from the Royal Malaysian Police. The main differences are that five colours are trooped, covering all three branches of the Armed Forces, and some of marches played are locally composed. This three-fold representation is reflected in the composition of the Colours Party, the Escort for/to the Colours and the Massed Military Bands in attendance.

The 2014 event was held on Friday 13 June, at Kem Perdana, Sungai Besi, which was a departure from normal tradition of the Saturday troopings. This was the very first time in Malaysian history that Trooping the Colour was held on the Friday in June closest to the King's Birthday, rather than the traditional first Saturday of the month. In an old tradition which resumed in 2016 at the National Heroes' Square, Putrajaya, if the celebrations fall on Ramadan, then the birthday parade is held on the Friday before 31 July, Heroes' Day.

For the first time in history, the traditional Trooping the Colours was held on 19 September 2017, the Tuesday after Malaysia Day, in National Heroes' Square, Putrajaya, given the decision to move the King's Birthday to the Monday following Independence Day. With the move to September, the Trooping the Colours in Putrajaya ends more than a month of national celebrations in honour of the anniversary of Malaysian independence in 1957, and the formation of the armed forces in 1932.

The old June date was restored in 2019.

=== Malta ===
Given Malta's history as a former British dominion, the Armed Forces of Malta (AFM) performs Trooping the Colour every 13 December in celebration of Republic Day at St. George's Square in Valletta, the national capital. The salute is taken by the President of Malta, who is the commander in chief of the AFM.

The units that provide the colour and official band are from the 1st Regiment, Armed Forces of Malta, and the Armed Forces of Malta Band.

=== Singapore ===
The Singapore Armed Forces performs Trooping the Colours in the SAF Day Parade on 1 July. It is held on special occasions, and is toned down as compared to the British version, and is done after the awarding of the State Colours to the best units of the Army, Navy, and Air Force. If new Colours have been consecrated on SAF day, they are usually included in the Trooping, but if otherwise, are Trooped on a separate day. The Escorts to the Colour (No.1 Guard) are usually formed by the Singapore Armed Forces Military Police Command's Military Police Enforcement Unit, while Nos. 2-5 Guards are composed of personnel from the SAF National Day Parade Guard of Honour Contingents. Unlike the British parade, it has supporting contingents that march past as well.

The salute is taken by the President of Singapore, the Prime Minister of Singapore, and the Chief of Defence Force, while the band in attendance is either the SAF Central Band or the SAF Ceremonial Band A (both from the Singapore Armed Forces Bands).

The No.2 Guard is usually made up of personnel from the Singapore Army's Best Army Unit Competition winner for the current year, typically the 1st Commando Battalion, Singapore Armed Forces Commando Formation. Of Nos. 3 and 4 Guards, these are, as of recent NDPs, formed up of the Republic of Singapore Navy's (RSN) Naval Diving Unit and the Republic of Singapore Air Force's (RSAF) Air Power Generation Command. HQ Digital and Intelligence Service began to provide No.5 Guard beginning in 2023, in honour of its formation in 2022.

Alongside the SAF Day Trooping, it has also been performed on formation, unit or command anniversaries.

=== Uganda ===
The Ugandan Armed Forces (UAF) performs a Trooping the Colour on Independence Day on Kololo Ceremonial Grounds in the national capital, with salute being taken by the President of Uganda.

=== Former countries ===
==== Rhodesia ====
On 25 April 1954, a date which was later designated as Tanlwe Chaung Day, the Rhodesian African Rifles performed the first ever Trooping of the Colour in Southern Rhodesia in the presence of Governor General Lord Llewellin.

The Rhodesian Light Infantry (RLI) trooped their Colour for the only time on 27 July 1970 at Cranborne Barracks, with the Mayor of Salisbury (now Harare), the Minister of Defence Jack Howman, Prime Minister Ian Smith, and the commanding officer of the Rhodesian African Rifles in attendance. Regimental Sergeant Major Robin Tarr began the proceedings at 10:35, after which the Rhodesian African Rifles Band and Drums began playing the RLI's slow march, The Incredibles, as the RLI troopers marched onto the parade square. The regimental colour was then trooped, before finally the RLI men performed a march-past in slow and quick time.

==== Ireland ====
Before the First World War and the partition of Ireland, Trooping the Colour was performed annually on 17 March, Saint Patrick's Day, by the garrison battalions in the Upper Castle Yard at Dublin Castle, in the presence of the Lord Lieutenant of Ireland.

== Trooping the Colour elsewhere ==
=== Jordan ===
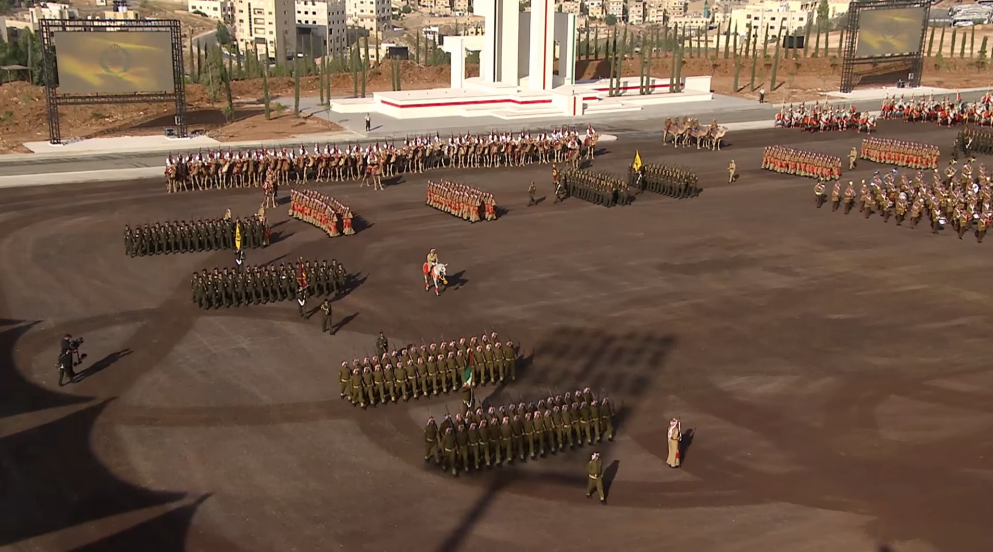
Trooping the Colour in Al-Rayah Square, Jordan 2016.

Jordan hosted its first Trooping the Colour; the first in the Middle East, in June 2016 celebrating the centenary of the Arab Revolt against the Ottoman Empire. The Parade was the official celebrations of the centennial of the Great Arab Revolt (Arabic: الاحتفالات الرسمية لمئوية الثورة العربية الكبرى) or Arab Revolt Parade on coverage online. In 2017, the Trooping of the Colour (officially known as the Flag Parade) was moved to September, and is held annually. Around 1,000 troops take part in the parade, which is held in Amman, the national capital. Al Rayah Square (Square of the Emblem) was specially built for this occasion near the royal court. It stands on an area of 6,300 square metres (68,000 square feet), and can host up to 5,000 people. In the parade, the King awards the Colours of the Arab Revolt to one of the army's battalions, which holds it until the next Trooping the Colour.

In 2016, the colours went to the 28th Prince Hussein bin Abdullah II Rangers Brigade. In 2017, the colours were awarded to the 39th Ja'far bin Abi Talib Infantry Battalion. In 2018, the colours were in the possession of the 9th Prince Mohammed Mechanised Battalion.

==== Regiments that take possession of the Colour of the Arab Revolt ====
Year	Regiment	Comments
2018	9th Prince Muhammad Infantry Battalion	Parade was held on Thursday 4 October 2018.
2017	39th Ja'far bin Abi Talib Infantry Battalion	Parade was held on Thursday 28 September 2017.
2016	28th prince Hussein bin Abdullah II Rangers Brigade	Parade was held on Thursday 2 June 2016. First ever Trooping the Colour in Jordan as well as in the Middle East. As one of the country-wide celebrations of the Great Arab Revolt centennial and the Arab Awakening anniversary.

== See also ==
- List of marches of the British Armed Forces
- Winston (horse)
- Beating Retreat
- Presentation of Colours
- Thai Royal Guards parade
- Hanover Schützenfest, including the largest marksmen parade in Germany
- Bayerischer Defiliermarsch, Bavarian march used in similar circumstances
- Koningsdag

== Bibliography ==
- Her Majesty The Queen's Birthday Parade. Saturday 17 June 2006 and 16 June 2007. Official programme.
- n.a. The Guards : Changing of the Guard, Trooping the Colour, The Regiments. Norwich: Jarrold Publishing, 2005. A Pitkin Guide. (This revised edition published 1990. Originally published by Macmillan Press Ltd., 1972) ISBN 0-85372-476-8.
- Trooping the Colour. BBC 1 and 2 television coverage, 11 June 2005, 17 June 2006 and 16 June 2007.
- Binda, Alexandre (2007). Heppenstall, David (ed.). Masodja: The History of the Rhodesian African Rifles and its forerunner the Rhodesian Native Regiment. Johannesburg: 30° South Publishers. ISBN 978-1-920143-03-9.
- Binda, Alexandre (2008). The Saints: The Rhodesian Light Infantry. Johannesburg: 30° South Publishers. ISBN 978-1-920143-07-7.
