= Spin Wheel =

British drill manoeuvre

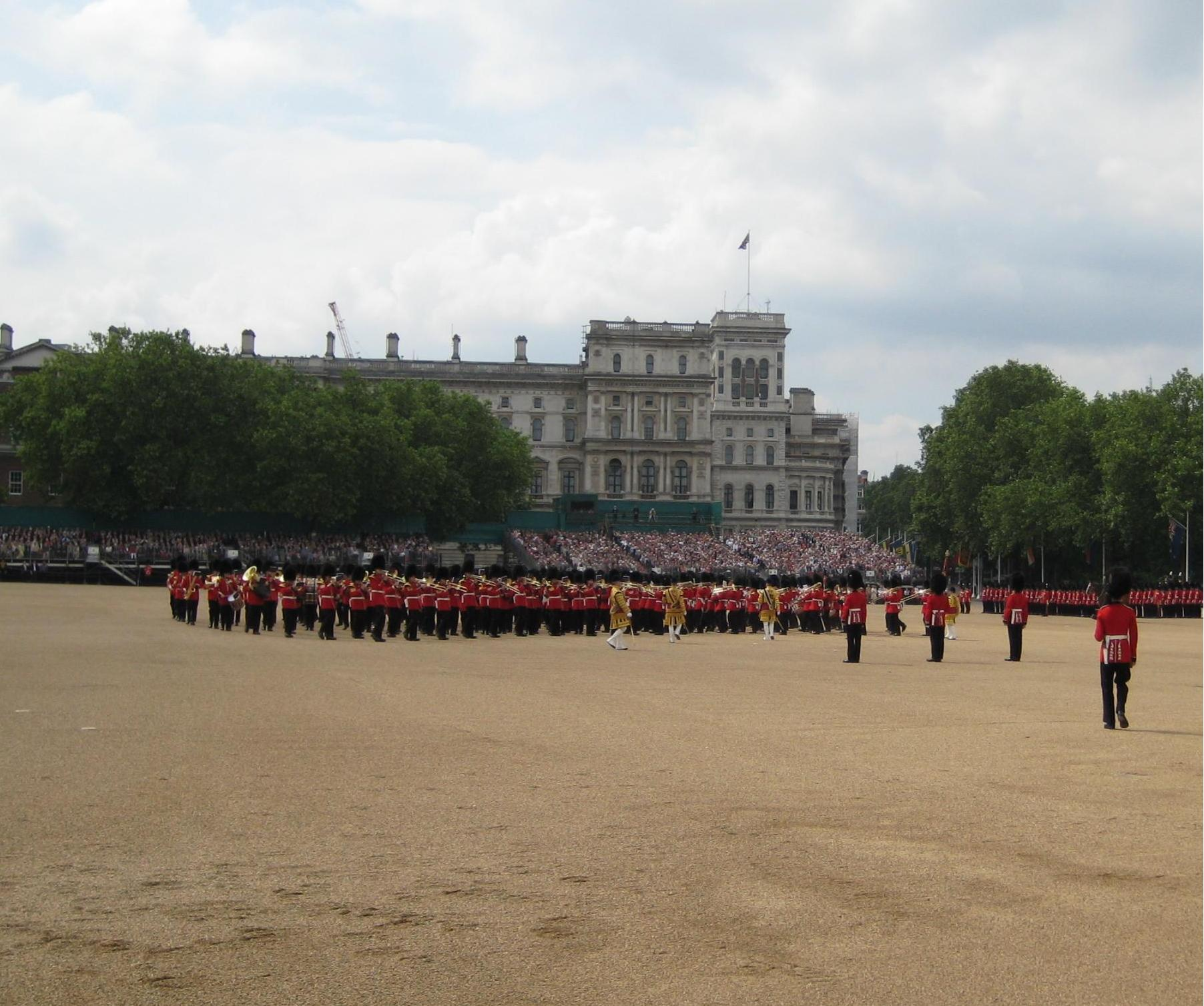

The Spin Wheel is a British drill manoeuvre. The manoeuvre is not written down, but is instead passed down from one generation of musicians to the next.

The manoeuvre is performed at the Trooping the Colour by The Massed Bands, Corps of Drums, and Pipes and Drums of His Majesty's Guards Division, and was designed after the addition of the then newly formed Regimental Bands of the Welsh and Irish Guards to the parade. With over 400 musicians, it became impossible to turn the formation in the standard manner using a 'wheel'. As such, the Spin Wheel was required.

The manoeuvre itself is extremely complex, and is coordinated by the more experienced non-commissioned officers within the ranks. It results in the entire formation pivoting on its centre, then continuing the ceremony.

In June 2020 the Welsh Guards performed the Spin Wheel at the Trooping The Colour performance at Windsor Castle. They performed the move while social distancing due to COVID-19 restrictions.
