= Hyde Park Barracks =

Hyde Park Barracks may refer to

- Hyde Park Barracks, London in England
- Hyde Park Barracks, Sydney in Australia
