= Elizabeth Godwin =

British army officer (1997–2025)

- Born: Elizabeth Helen Godwin; 7 February 1997; Devon, England
- Died: 5 September 2025 (aged 28); Surrey, England
- Military career
- Allegiance: United Kingdom
- Branch: British Army
- Service years: 2020–2025
- Rank: Captain
- Unit: The Life Guards
- Awards: Sword of Honour
- Education: Exeter School; Trent College; Royal Military Academy Sandhurst; King's College London

Captain Elizabeth Helen Godwin (7 February 1997 – 5 September 2025) was a British Army officer in the Household Cavalry. She was the first woman to commission into The Life Guards, becoming an officer in the regiment in 2020.

== Early life and education ==
Born on 7 February 1997, Godwin grew up in Devon. She came from a military family and her grandfather, who served in the British Army, was stationed in Egypt, Gibraltar, and India.

She was educated at Elm Grove School in Topsham and Exeter School, where she played field hockey, was an equestrian, and a member of the Combined Cadet Force. After Exeter, she completed her A-levels at Trent College. Godwin was awarded an army scholarship and a spot at Royal Military Academy Sandhurst. She studied nursing at King's College London while working at Great Ormond Street Hospital and serving in the Army Reserves.

In 2019, while completing her military training at Sandhurst, she was awarded the Sword of Honour.

== Military career ==
Godwin was the first female officer to commission into The Life Guards, joining in 2020. Women were first permitted to join the regiment in 2017.

As an officer, she commanded vehicles patrolling across Dartmoor and led her platoon on exercises in Gibraltar. In 2022, she moved to Hyde Park Barracks in London from Bulford Camp on Salisbury Plain. Later that year, she rode in the processions during the state funeral of Queen Elizabeth II.

She was present at the Coronation of Charles III and Camilla as part of the Sovereign's Escort during the processions.

In 2023, Godwin led an escort of forty-seven soldiers and thirty-three horses for Anne, Princess Royal at CHIO Aachen in Germany. She orchestrated the regiment's Musical Ride, which is a series of cavalry drills set to music, which was performed in front of forty-thousand people.

== Death ==
Godwin died in a traffic collision in Surrey on 5 September 2025, at the age of 28.
