= Horse Guards (building) =

Coordinates: 51°30′17″N 0°07′38″W

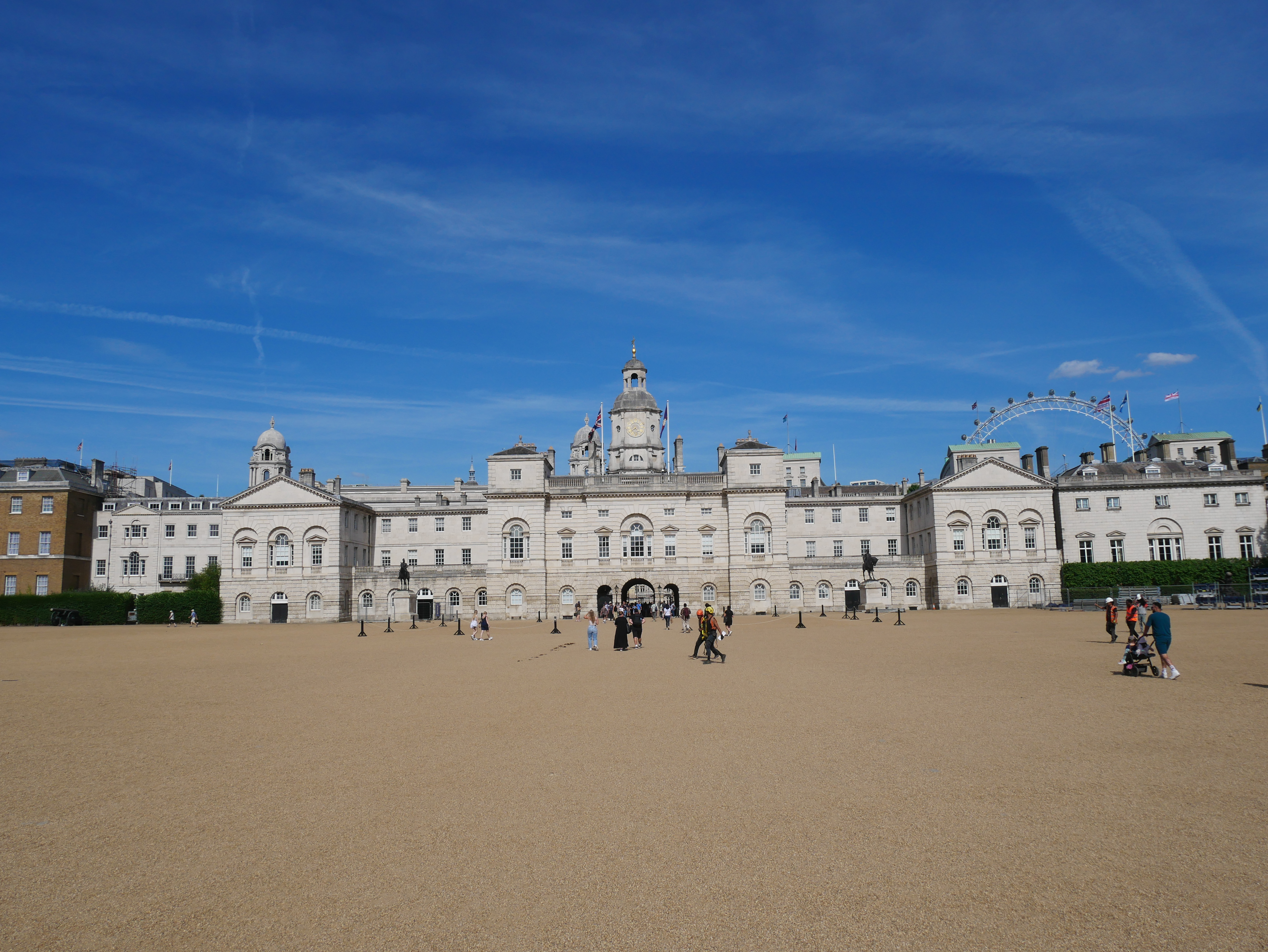
- Horse Guards viewed across Horse Guards Parade with the London Eye in the background.
- Interactive map of the Horse Guards area

General information
- Type: Military headquarters, barracks and stables
- Architectural style: Palladian
- Location: London, SW1
- Construction started: 1750
- Completed: 1759; 267 years ago

Technical details
- Floor count: four

Design and construction
- Architects: William Kent, John Vardy and William Robinson

Horse Guards is a historic building in the City of Westminster, London, between Whitehall and Horse Guards Parade. It was built in the mid-18th century, replacing an earlier building, as a barracks and stables for the Household Cavalry. The current and previous buildings were, between the early 18th century and 1858, the main military headquarters for the British Empire. Horse Guards originally formed the entrance to the Palace of Whitehall and later St James's Palace; for that reason it is still ceremonially defended by the King's Life Guard.

Although still in military use, part of the building houses the Household Cavalry Museum which is open to the public. It also functions as a gateway between Whitehall and St James's Park.

== History ==
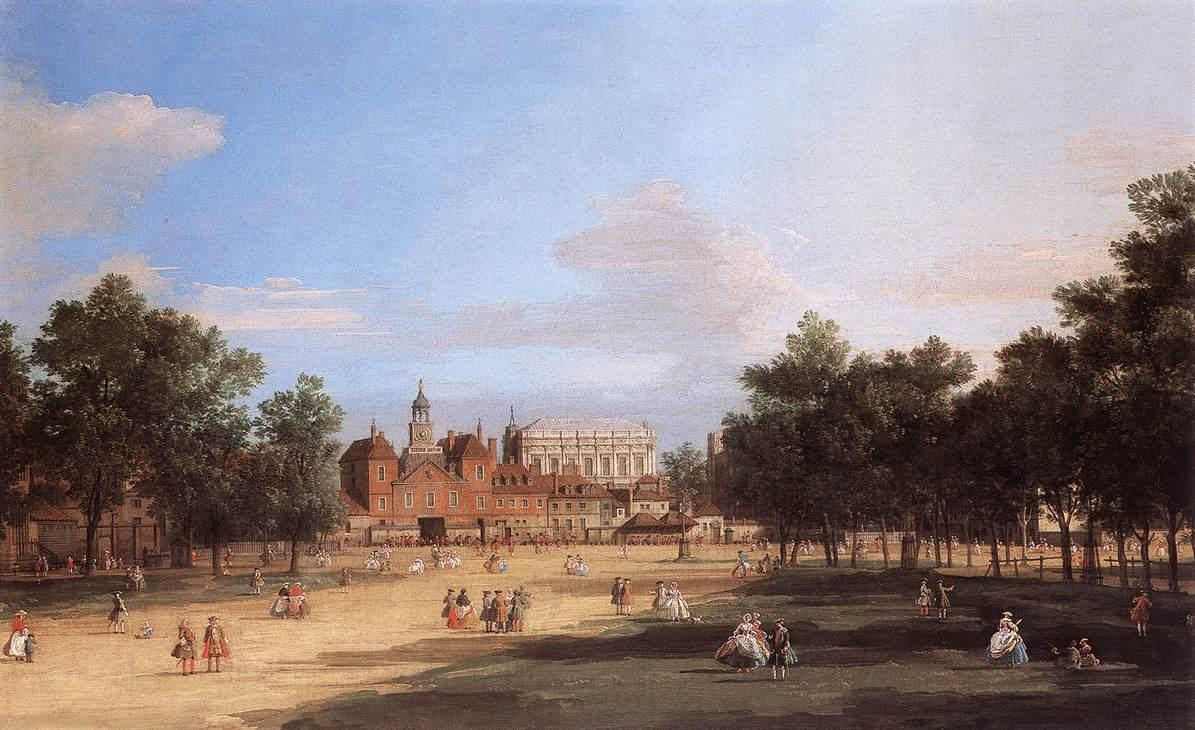
Old Horse Guards from St James's Park in 1749; painting by Canaletto.

The first Horse Guards building was commissioned by King Charles II in 1663, on the site of a cavalry stables which had been built on the tiltyard of the Palace of Whitehall during the Commonwealth. Built of red brick and costing some £4,000, it comprised a central range with a clock tower, under which an arch connected Whitehall with St James's Park; two wings enclosed a courtyard with two large sentry boxes for mounted troopers on the Whitehall side, facing the palace gate. Entry to the park, then an enclosed private garden, was controlled by special ivory passes issued to favoured courtiers, a tradition which continues to the present, although the modern passes are made of plastic; only the monarch has the right to drive through the arch without a pass. Initially, the building was intended only to accommodate the King's Guard and included stabling for more than a hundred cavalry horses on the ground floor, as well as separate barracks for the foot guards. Following a fire at Whitehall in 1698, the court transferred to St James's Palace, therefore the function of Horse Guards changed to controlling the ceremonial approach to St James's from Westminster.

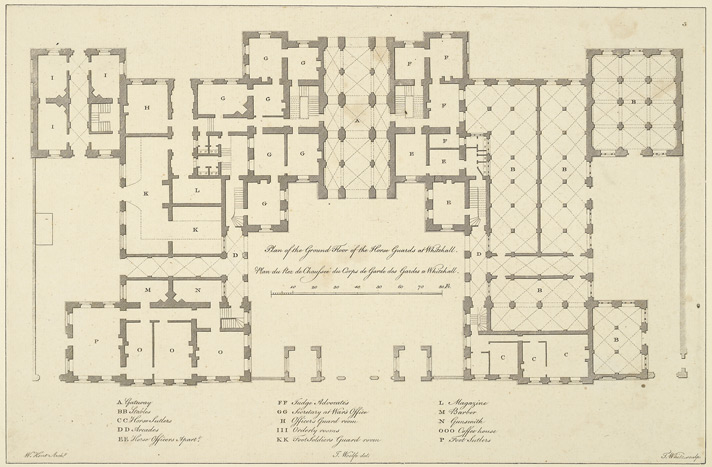
A plan of William Kent's design for the new Horse Guards, dated 1750, the year that work commenced but after Kent's death.

In the following decades, Horse Guards was increasingly used as administrative offices for the growing regular army and soon became overcrowded. The fabric of the building was also allowed to deteriorate; pieces of falling masonry were said to be a danger to the sentries. In 1745, King George II commissioned a new building in the fashionable Palladian style by the architect William Kent. Having to reuse the same plot of land, Kent managed to retain essentially the same plan as the original building while doubling the interior space. Kent died in April 1748 before the old Horse Guards had been demolished; work on the new building commenced in 1750 under the direction of Kent's assistant, John Vardy and William Robinson from the Office of Works. The buildings cost £65,000 and took nearly ten years to complete. The Household Cavalry moved into the northern wing of the uncompleted building in 1755; at that time, there was stabling for 62 horses compared to 17 today. Originally, the two wings were connected to the central block by single storey ranges; in 1803-05 a further two floors were added to these, giving the building its present appearance. Kent's decision to retain a Baroque clock tower on his new Palladian building resulted in a peculiar blend of styles, perhaps the cause of it being described by Charles Knight as "the ugliest building in the metropolis".

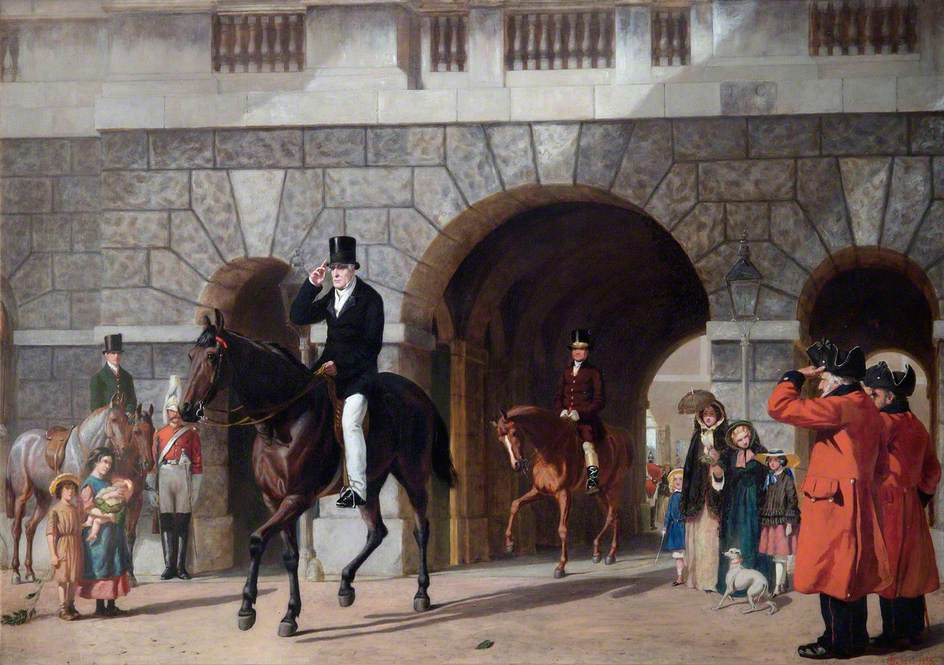
His Last Return from Duty by James William Glass, depicting the Duke of Wellington leaving Horse Guards for the last time in 1852.

The building also served as the offices for the various administrative departments responsible to the Secretary at War, which would eventually become formalised as the War Office. Also located at Horse Guards was the office of the Commander-in-Chief of the Forces. Hence, for many decades the term 'Horse Guards' was used as a metonym for British Army headquarters. Two famous occupants of the office, a room originally intended for courts-martial, were Prince Frederick, Duke of York and Albany (1795–1809), popularly believed to be "The Grand Old Duke of York", and the Duke of Wellington (1827–28 and 1842–1852). Wellington's coffin rested in this room on the night before his state funeral in 1852. The final Commander-in-Chief at Horse Guards was Prince George, Duke of Cambridge, who was so reluctant to move to the new War Office building at Cumberland House in Pall Mall that he had to be ordered to vacate the building by Queen Victoria in 1858. Wellington's desk is preserved in the same room, which is now the office of the Major-General Commanding the Household Division and General Officer Commanding London District. Horse Guards subsequently became the headquarters of two major Army commands: the London District and the Household Cavalry.

At the annual Trooping the Colour ceremony in June, members of the Royal Family who are not participants watch the parade from the windows of Wellington's office over the archway.

=== Historic listing designations ===
Horse Guards is a Grade I listed building. Its gates and railings and sentry boxes on the Whitehall front have a separate Grade I listing.

== Horse Guards Clock ==
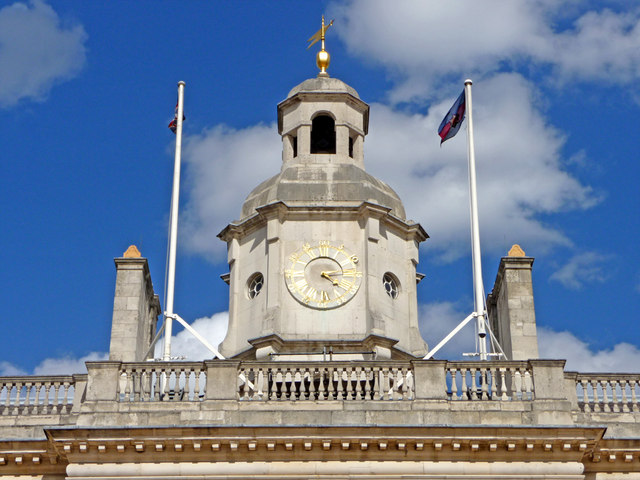
Horse Guards Clock, dating from 1756

The clock is sited in the turret above the main archway; it has two faces, one facing Whitehall and the other, Horse Guards Parade, each dial being 7 feet 5 inches (2.26 metres) in diameter. It strikes the quarter-hours on two bells. Originally made by Thwaites in 1756, the clock was rebuilt in 1815–16 by Benjamin Lewis Vulliamy, the clockmaker to King George III. Prior to the completion of the clock of Big Ben in 1859, the Horse Guards Clock was the main public clock in Westminster. A dark stain above the Roman number two on the clock face is supposed to mark the time of the execution of King Charles I in 1649, which took place in the roadway outside Horse Guards. The annual ceremony of Trooping the Colour commences when the Horse Guards Clock strikes eleven.

== Household Cavalry Museum ==
Household Cavalry Museum

The Household Cavalry Museum is the official museum of the Household Cavalry and is located in the Horse Guards. Visitors can view the horses in the 18th-century working stables through a glazed partition. Exhibits explain the training and history of the regiment and include ceremonial uniforms, regalia, royal standards, awards, musical instruments, horse furniture and silverware by Fabergé. Visitors to the museum are welcome to watch the afternoon inspection of the guards and horses that happens daily at 4 pm. This routine began in 1894 when Queen Victoria found the guards drinking and gambling in the afternoon instead of tending to their duty. She proclaimed that they would be punished by a four o'clock inspection daily for the next 100 years. This proclamation and punishment officially expired in 1994, but Queen Elizabeth II chose to continue the inspection during her reign out of respect for tradition.

Between 2001 and 2011 Major Michael Whatley used the museum's name without its knowledge to acquire a number of tanks and armoured vehicles from European museums, some of which he then sold on. He was convicted of three counts of misconduct in a public office in 2021.

== Ceremonial ==
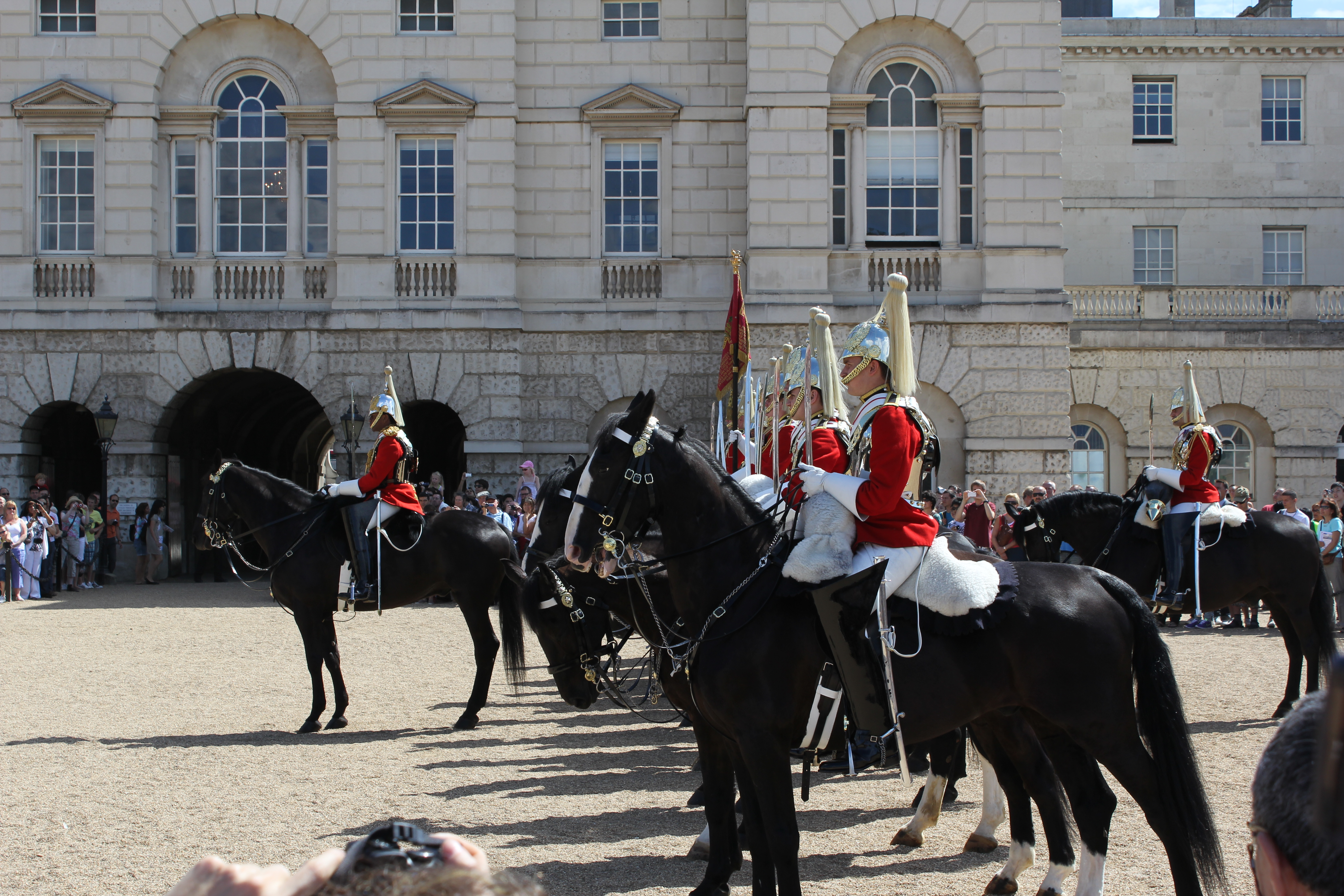
The daily ceremony of Changing The King's Life Guard on Horse Guards Parade.

Every morning, the mounted King's Life Guard rides from Hyde Park Barracks in Knightsbridge, by way of Hyde Park Corner, Constitution Hill and The Mall, to take over guard duties in a ceremony at 11:00 am, or 10:00 am on Sundays. The guard is usually provided by the Household Cavalry Mounted Regiment, which consists of a squadron from each of the Household Cavalry regiments; the Life Guards who wear red tunics and white helmet-plumes, and the Blues and Royals who wear blue tunics and red plumes. However, some other mounted units from Britain and other Commonwealth realms occasionally mount the guard; the King's Troop, Royal Horse Artillery and the Royal Canadian Mounted Police are examples.

When the monarch is in London, the guard consists of one officer and twelve other ranks including a trumpeter and standard bearer; known as a Long Guard. When the monarch is not in London, the guard is reduced to two non-commissioned officers and ten troopers; known as a Short Guard.

The ceremony of Changing The King's Life Guard takes place on Horse Guards Parade adjacent to the Horse Guards building. Two mounted sentries guard the entrance to Horse Guards on Whitehall from 10:00 am until 4:00 pm and are changed every hour. There is a dismounted parade at 4:00 pm (described above) and two dismounted sentries remain on duty until 8:00 pm.

== Gallery ==
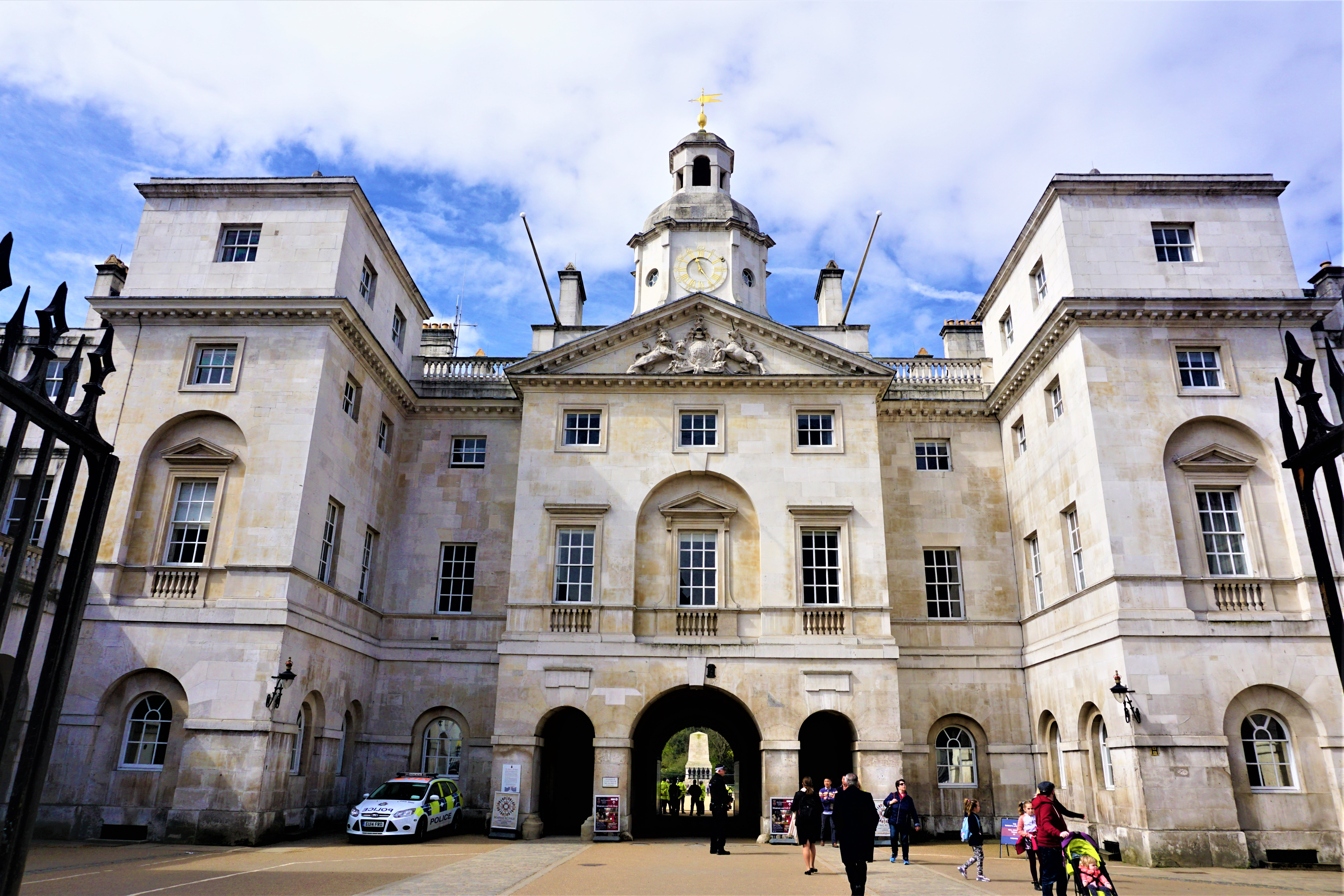
Horse Guards viewed from Whitehall

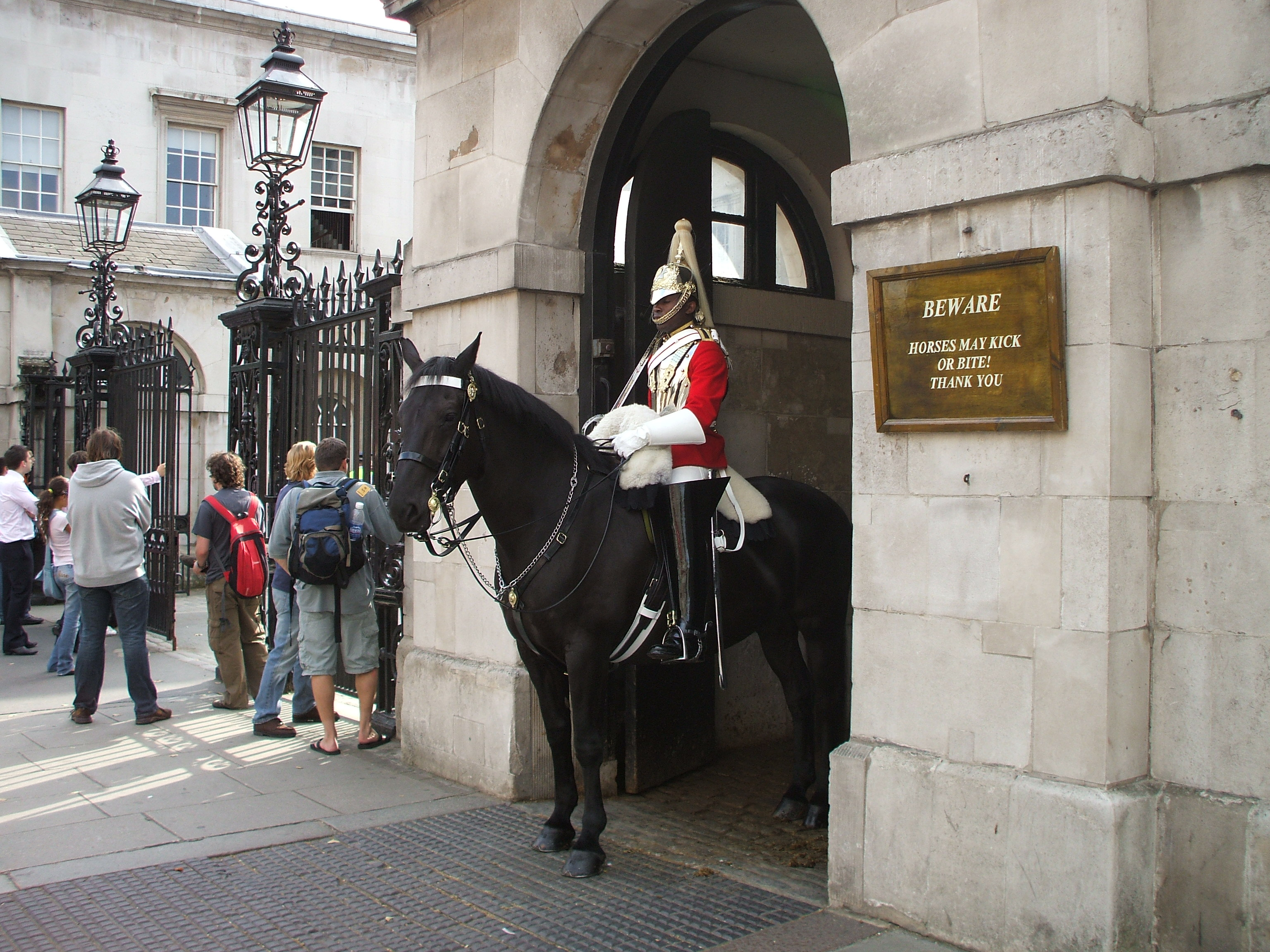
A mounted trooper of the Life Guards on duty at Horse Guards

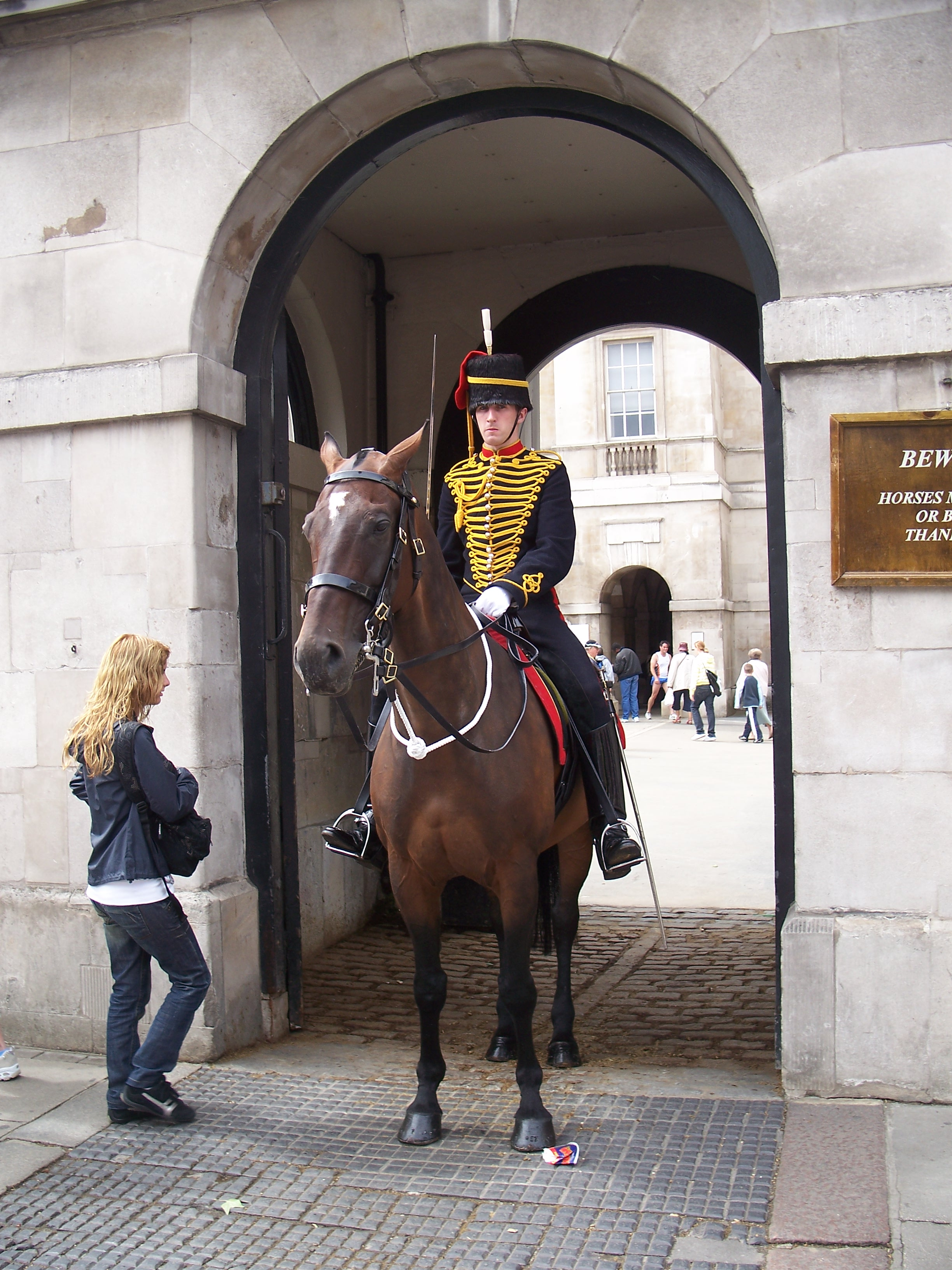
A mounted trooper of the King's Troop, Royal Horse Artillery on duty at Horse Guards

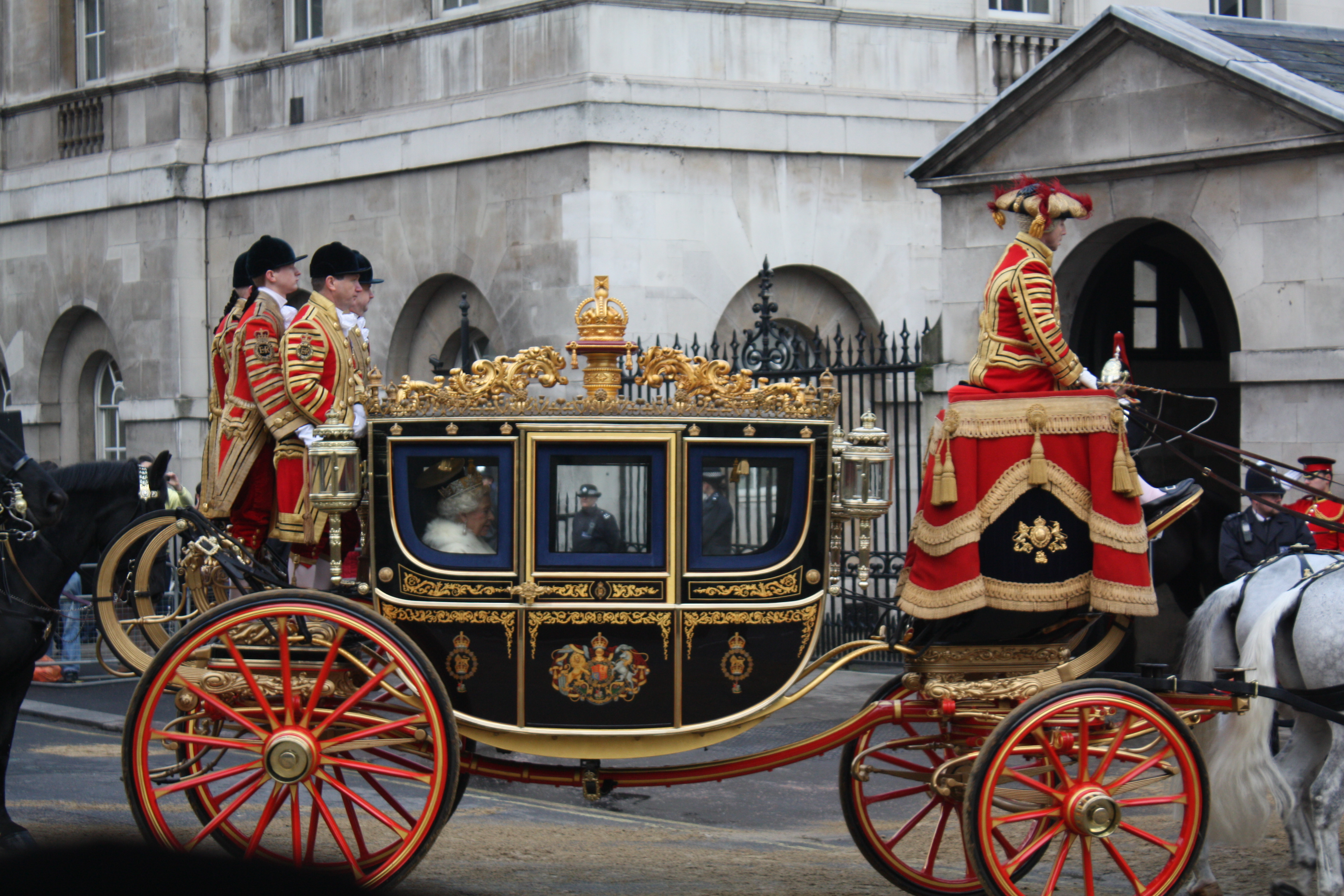
Queen Elizabeth II approaches Horse Guards in the Irish State Coach following the State Opening of Parliament in 2008.

== Bibliography ==
- Stocqueler, Joachim Hayward (1873). A Personal History of the Horse-Guards from 1750 to 1872. London: Hurst and Blackett.
- Tabor, Paddy (2010). The Household Cavalry Museum. Ajanta Book Publishing. ISBN 978-1-84820-882-7.
