= Barnsby Saddles =

Barnsby Saddles was a saddlery based in Walsall, England. At its peak, it was among the top five saddlery businesses in the world, exporting saddles and other leather goods all over the world. The company made ceremonial equipment for many military units round the world, including the Royal Horse Artillery, the Household Cavalry and various Police Forces.

== History ==
The company started with the Cliff family in 1793. George Cliff followed his father into the trade and his son Jabez, the only surviving child of the family, carried on the family tradition. Jabez was a family name, and in 1873, another Jabez Cliff started up his own saddlery business in Portland Street, Walsall. But tragedy struck in 1881, when the typhoid epidemic that engulfed Britain claimed Jabez and his two sons. The company would have collapsed but it was rescued by Jabez’s wife, Mary, and his daughter, who kept the business going. In 1882, Mary remarried, to Frederick Joseph Tibbits, a skilled bridlemaker, so the company could now produce saddles and bridles. Their only son, Jabez Cliff Tibbits, joined the company in 1902.

Jabez Cliff Tibbits sought to expand the company and put in a bid for the prominent saddlemakers, J A Barnsby & Son, and the offer was accepted. This was made all the easier by the close proximity of the Barnsby works, so the two companies could amalgamate without difficulty. The incorporation resulted in the ‘Cliff-Barnsby’ brand name – Barnsby making saddles, while high quality bridles were manufactured under the Cliff name.

Jabez’ business judgement was put to the test in the run-up to the First World War. The company’s main export markets were Germany and Russia, but the political climate of the time made these untenable. Alternative areas for profit had to be found, and Jabez decided to diversify into other products, such as sports equipment, bags, travel goods and leather cases. The company patented a new non-tear football which was used in four FA Cup Finals, and even in the 1928 Olympic Games. During the Second World War the company began making military equipment such as gun pouches and webbing.

The connection with the military continued into subsequent conflicts. During the Falklands War, the military found themselves in a difficult position as the terrain was hazardous for motor transport. They were forced to rely on mules to move men and equipment, and turned to Barnsby to urgently make the necessary tack.

Jabez, who had become managing director in the 1920s, was knighted in 1948 by George VI, and was later elected Mayor of Walsall. He then became an Alderman of Walsall, and died in 1974.

On 17 June 2014, it was reported that Barnsby had ceased trading due to a failed restructure and had gone into administration.
