= Household Cavalry =

British Army corps

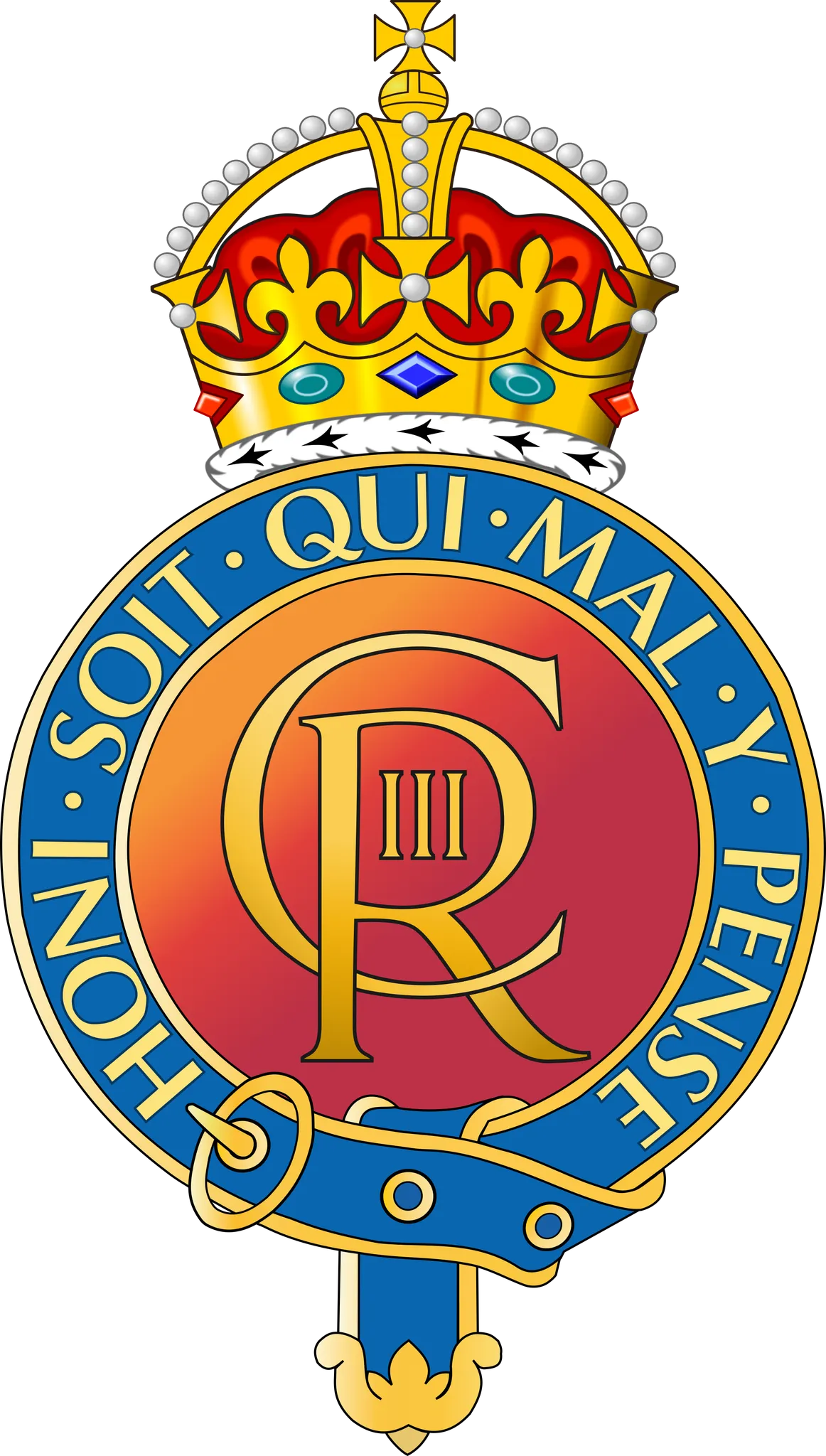
- Badge of the Household Cavalry
- Active: Since 1992 (roots dating back to 1660)
- Country: United Kingdom
- Branch: British Army
- Type: Cavalry
- Role: Household Cavalry Regiment (armoured cavalry regiment); Household Cavalry Mounted Regiment (public duties)
- Size: Corps of two regiments: The Life Guards; The Blues and Royals
- Part of: Household Division
- Garrison/HQ: RHQ – Horse Guards, London
- Mottos: Honi soit qui mal y pense (Middle French for 'Shame on him who thinks evil of it')
- Equipment: Warrior; AJAX

Commanders
- Colonel-in-Chief: The King
- Colonels of the regiments: The Princess Royal (Blues and Royals); Lieutenant General Sir Edward Smyth-Osbourne (The Life Guards)

Insignia
- Tactical Recognition Flash
- Abbreviation: HCav

The Household Cavalry (HCAV) is a corps of the Household Division that is made up of the two most senior regiments of the British Army – The Life Guards and The Blues and Royals (Royal Horse Guards and 1st Dragoons). They have taken part in every major conflict since 1660. These regiments are divided between the Household Cavalry Regiment stationed at Wing Barracks in Wiltshire, with an armored reconnaissance role, and the ceremonial mounted unit, the Household Cavalry Mounted Regiment, garrisoned at Hyde Park Barracks in London. Both the HCMR and HCR are made up of elements of the Life Guards and the Blues and Royals. The Household Cavalry is part of the Household Division and is the King's official bodyguard. Although the Household Cavalry Regiment is armoured, it is not part of the Royal Armoured Corps, being assigned to the Household Division.

== Regiments ==
The Household Cavalry is classed as a corps in its own right, and consists of two regiments: The Life Guards and The Blues and Royals (Royal Horse Guards and 1st Dragoons). They are the senior regular regiments in the British Army, with traditions dating from 1660, and act as the King's personal bodyguard. They are the cavalry element of the guards regiments and, with the five foot guard regiments, constitute the seven guards regiments of the Household Division.

Regiment	Tunic colour	Plume colour	Chinstrap	Collar colour	Quick March	Slow March	Trot
The Life Guards	Red	White	Worn below bottom lip	Blue	Millanollo	Life Guards; Slow March	Keel Row Colonel Lieutenant General Sir Edward Smyth-Osbourne
The Blues and Royals	Blue	Red	Worn below chin	Red	Blues and Royals and Grand March from Aida	Blues and Royals; Slow March	Keel Row General The Princess Royal

== Organisation ==
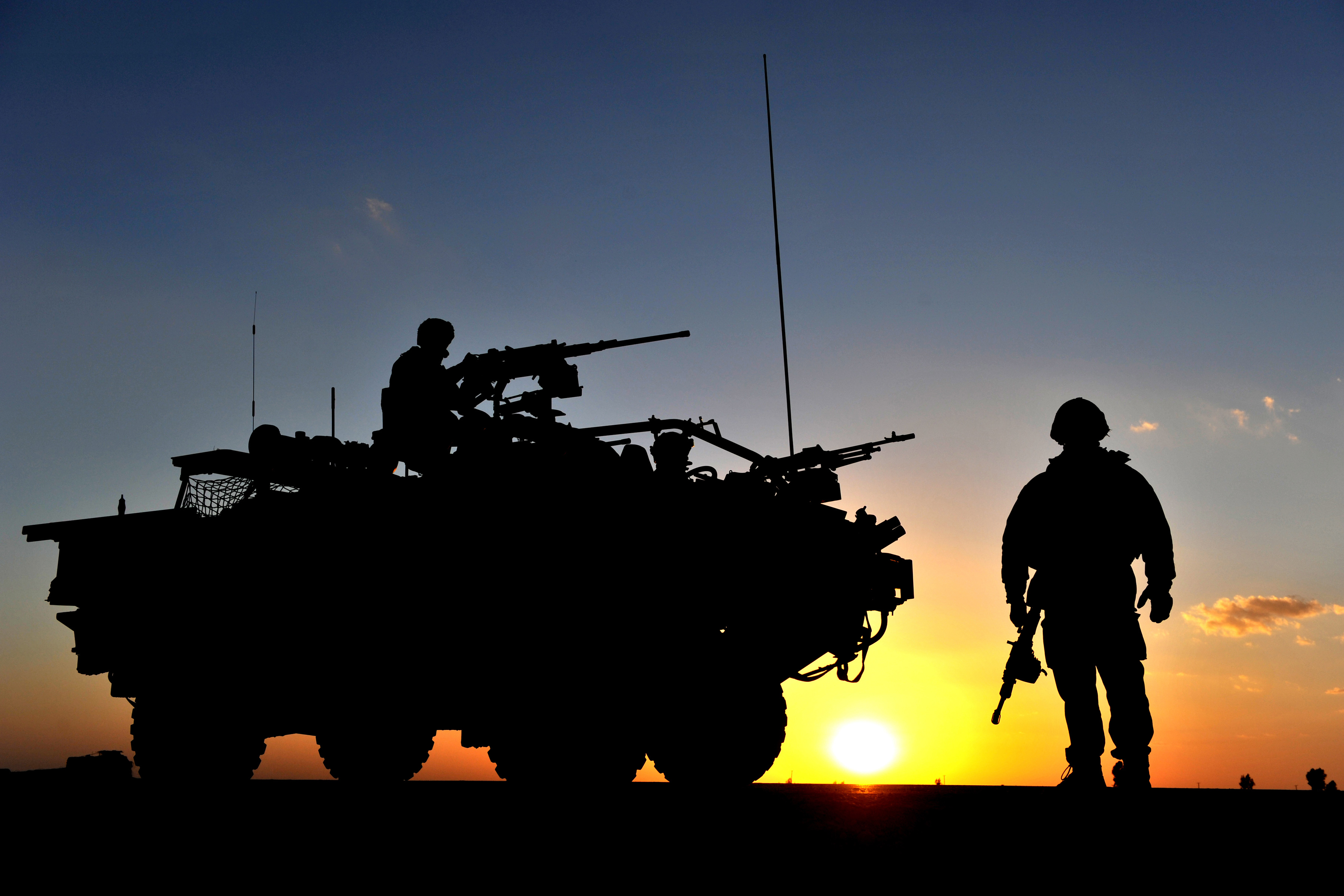
A Household Cavalry Jackal provides security at a temporary Vehicle Check Point (VCP) during Op HERRICK 13. The HCR has deployed to Afghanistan in CVR(T), Jackal and without vehicles at all.

Below is the structure of the regiment:

- Household Cavalry Regiment, at Powle Lines, Bulford Camp (Armoured Reconnaissance)
  - Regimental Headquarters
  - Headquarters Squadron
  - A Squadron
  - C Squadron
  - D Squadron
- Household Cavalry Mounted Regiment, at Hyde Park Barracks, London (Ceremonial, mounted duties at Horse Guards, London)
  - Regimental Headquarters
  - Headquarters Squadron
    - Winter Training Troop
    - Forge and Veterinary Department
    - Household Cavalry Training Wing, at Combermere Barracks, Windsor
  - The Life Guards Squadron
  - The Blues and Royals Squadron

The Household Cavalry as a whole is split into two different units that fulfil very distinct roles. These are both joint units, consisting of personnel from both regiments. Like other Cavalry formations, the Household Cavalry is divided into regiments (battalion-sized units) and squadrons (company-sized sub-units). The whole corps is under the command of the Commander Household Cavalry (formerly Colonel Commanding The Household Cavalry), who also holds the Royal Household appointment of Silver Stick in Waiting. He is a Colonel and is assisted by a retired lieutenant colonel as Regimental Adjutant.

The Household Cavalry Regiment (HCR) has an active operational role as a Formation Reconnaissance Regiment, serving in armoured fighting vehicles including the Warrior and Ajax, operating far ahead of the main body of friendly forces. Their role is to locate and report on the movement and disposition of enemy forces, and engage and destroy enemy reconnaissance elements that are seeking to do the same. The regiment forms one of five formation reconnaissance regiments in the British Army's order of battle. The HCR has four operational squadrons, three of which are traditional medium reconnaissance squadrons equipped with the Warrior and Ajax armoured fighting vehicles, and the fourth is referred to as Command and Support Squadron and includes specialists, such as Forward Air Controllers. One of the HCR's squadrons has been assigned to the airborne role, supporting 16 Air Assault Brigade Combat Team, since 2003. The regiment was formerly based at Combermere Barracks, Windsor, one mile from Windsor Castle, until its move to Bulford Camp, Wiltshire, in May 2019. The members of the Household Division have sometimes been required to undertake special tasks as the Sovereign's personal troops. The Household Cavalry were called to Windsor Castle on 20 November 1992 to assist with salvage operations following the 1992 Windsor Castle fire.

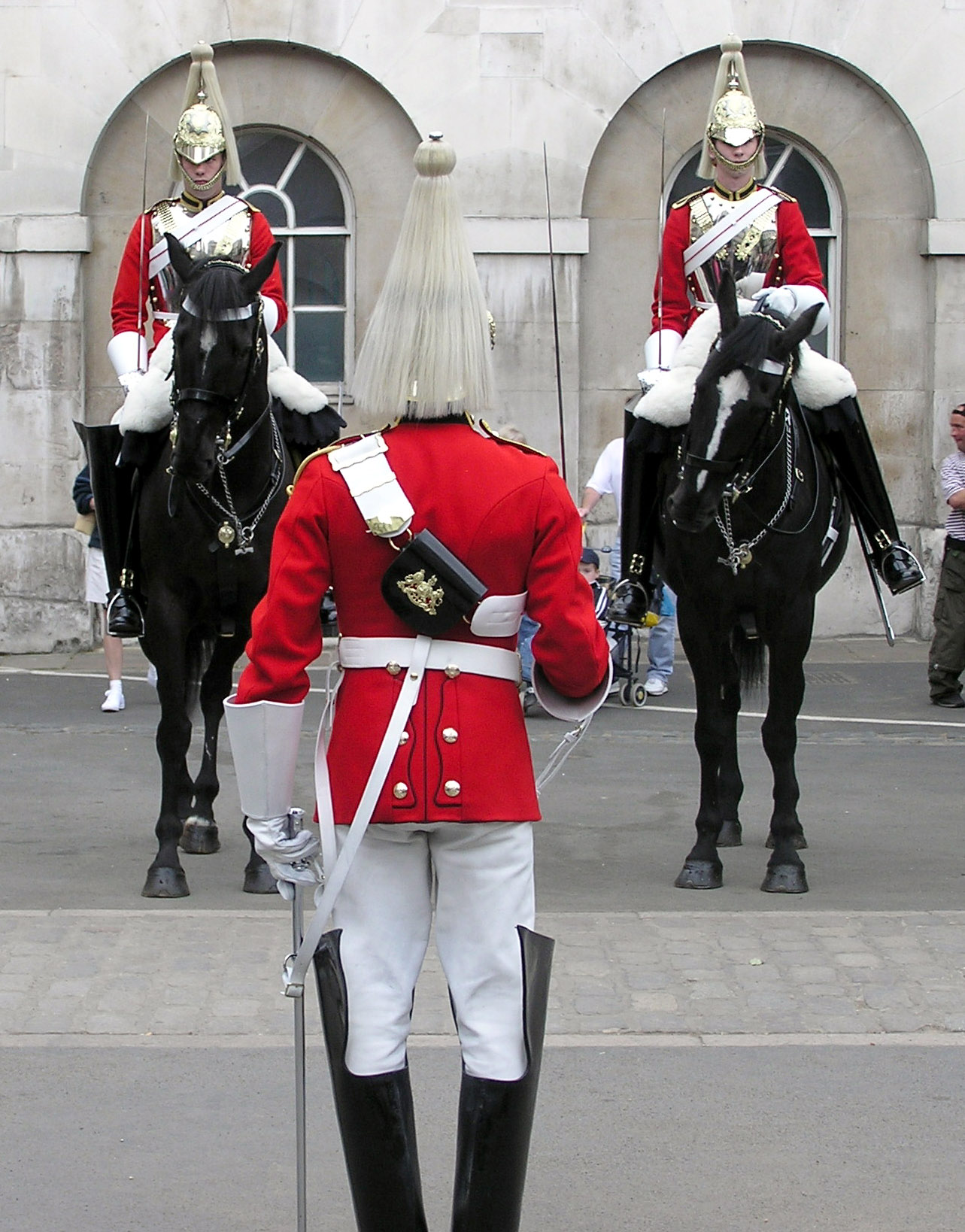
The Life Guards of the Household Cavalry mounting the guard at Horse Guards

The Household Cavalry Mounted Regiment (HCMR) is horsed and carries out mounted (and some dismounted) ceremonial duties on State and Royal occasions. These include the provision of a Sovereign's Escort, most commonly seen on The King's Birthday Parade (Trooping the Colour) in June each year. Other occasions include state visits by visiting heads of state, royal weddings, coronations, or whenever required by the British monarch, including ceremonies associated with the Death and state funeral of Elizabeth II. The regiment also mounts the King's Life Guard at Horse Guards. The HCMR consists of one squadron from The Life Guards, one from The Blues and Royals and a squadron called Headquarters Squadron, which is responsible for all administrative matters and includes the regimental headquarters (RHQ), the Riding Staff, Farriers, Tailors and Saddlers. The Regiment has been based (in various forms) at Hyde Park Barracks, Knightsbridge, since 1795. New troopers and officers are generally first assigned to London upon completion of horsemanship training, referred to, alongside the rest of HCMR personnel, as Mounted Dutymen, and remain there for up to three years. Like the five Foot Guards regiments they rotate between the operational and ceremonial roles.

=== King's Life Guard ===
The Household Cavalry Mounted Regiment provides the King's Life Guard, the mounted guard at the entrance to Horse Guards. Horse Guards is the official main entrance to both St James's Palace and Buckingham Palace. The guard is on horseback from 10 am until 4 pm, with the two sentries changing every hour. From 4 pm until 8 pm, a pair of dismounted sentries remain. At 8 pm, the gates of Horse Guards are locked, and a single sentry remains until 7 am. When the King is in London, the Guard consists of one officer, one corporal major (who carries the standard), two non-commissioned officers, one trumpeter and ten troopers. This is known as a "long guard". When the King is not resident in London, the Guard is reduced to two non-commissioned officers and ten troopers. This is known as a "short guard". Responsibility for mounting the guard alternates between The Life Guards and The Blues and Royals. Every summer, the King's Troop, Royal Horse Artillery takes over the role, while the HCMR conducts important regimental training outside of London.

== Ranks ==
=== Officers ===
Second Lieutenants in The Blues and Royals are known as Cornets. Officers also wear different crowns and stars on their badges of rank compared to officers of other regiments. Field officers in the Household Cavalry wear a depiction of the Tudor Crown (referred to in Army Dress Regulations as 'the Imperial Crown') minus the cap, including during the reign of Elizabeth II when field officers in all other regiments wore a depiction of St Edward's Crown. Instead of a depiction of the Bath star, the design used by officers in the Household Cavalry is the Garter star.

=== NCOs and other ranks ===
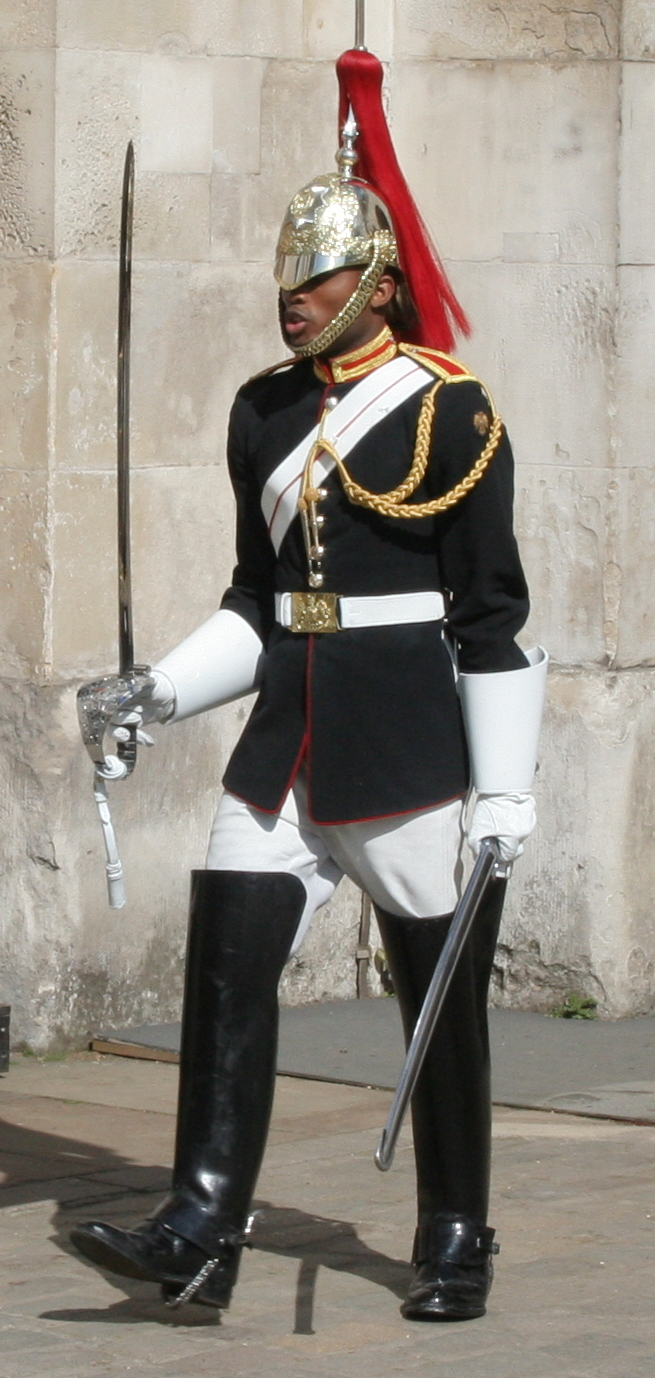
A lance corporal of the Blues and Royals in full dress, distinguished by basic aiguillettes and no shoulder cords

The rank names and insignia of non-commissioned officers in the Household Cavalry are unique in the British Army:

Rank insignia of the other ranks of the Household Cavalry
Rank group	Warrant officers			Senior NCOs			Junior NCOs		Soldiers	
NATO code	OR-9	OR-8		OR-7	OR-6	OR-5	OR-4	OR-3	OR-2	OR-1
Full dress insignia	Shoulder cords and aiguillettes, 1st class staff	Shoulder cords and aiguillettes, 1st class staff		Shoulder cords and aiguillettes, 2nd class staff				Aiguillettes only	No insignia	
Service dress insignia									No insignia	
Typical appointment	Regimental corporal major	Regimental quartermaster corporal	Squadron corporal major (Note: Farrier corporal majors also wear a gold embroidered horse shoe below a crown, each on a scarlet cloth background, and worn on the right forearm when wearing full dress, and a brass horse shoe below a crown and wreath on the right forearm when wearing no. 2 service dress. In full dress, WO2 trumpet majors wear shoulder cords and aiguillettes, 1st class staff, and gold embroidered crossed trumpets below a large gold embroidered crown, each on a cloth background of the regimental facing colour, and worn on the right forearm. On no. 2 service dress, WO2 trumpet majors wear a large crown above brass crossed trumpets above a four-bar chevron on the right forearm.)	Squadron quartermaster corporal (Note: Farrier staff corporals also wear a gold embroidered horse shoe on a scarlet cloth background on the right upper arm when wearing full dress, and a brass horse shoe between the chevrons and crown on the right forearm when wearing no. 2 service dress. In full dress, staff corporal trumpet majors wear the same dress as a WO2 trumpet major: shoulder cords and aiguillettes, 1st class staff, and gold embroidered crossed trumpets below a large gold embroidered crown, each on a cloth background of the regimental facing colour, and worn on the right forearm. On no. 2 service dress, WO2 trumpet majors wear a small crown above brass crossed trumpets above a four-bar chevron on the right forearm.)			Lance corporal of horse (Note: Farrier lance corporals of horse also wear a gold embroidered horse shoe on a scarlet cloth background on the right upper arm when wearing full dress, and a brass horse shoe between the chevrons and crown on the right upper arm when wearing no. 2 service dress.)			
Rank	Warrant officer class 1	Warrant officer class 2		Staff corporal (Note: Equivalent to a staff/colour sergeant)	Corporal of horse (Note: Equivalent to a sergeant. Farrier corporals of horse also wear a gold embroidered horse shoe on a scarlet cloth background on the right upper arm when wearing full dress, and a brass horse shoe between the chevrons and crown on the right upper arm when wearing no. 2 service dress.)		Corporal (Note: Corporals in the Household Cavalry are automatically appointed lance corporal of horse and wear a cloth crown above a three-bar chevron. Lance corporals of horse are allowed privileges normally reserved for sergeants in the British Army.)	Lance corporal (Note: Lance corporals in the Household Cavalry wear a two-bar chevron below a metal crown instead of a one-bar chevron. Farrier lance corporals also wear a gold embroidered horse shoe on a scarlet cloth background on the right upper arm when wearing full dress, and a brass horse shoe between the chevrons and crown on the right upper arm when wearing no. 2 service dress.)	Trooper	
Abbreviation	WO1	WO2		SCpl	CoH		LCoH	LCpl	Tpr	

Recruits were required to have a very high moral character. Before the Second World War, recruits were required to be at least 5 feet 10 inches tall, but could not exceed 6 feet 1 inch. They initially enlisted for eight years with the colours and a further four years with the reserve.

== Army farriers ==
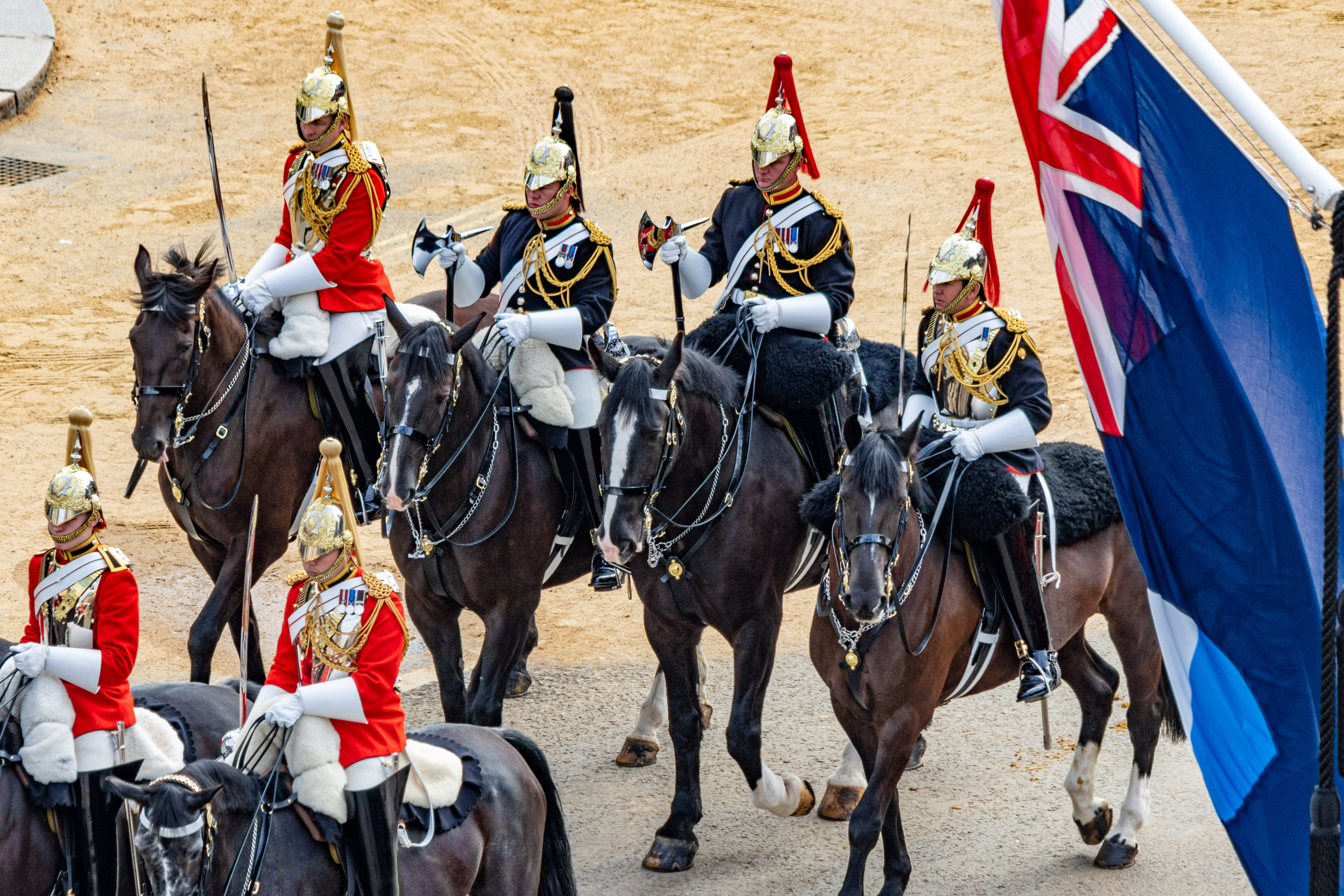
Farriers (with axes) bringing up the rear of the Sovereign's Escort in the Funeral Procession of Queen Elizabeth II (2022).

There is a farrier on call twenty-four hours a day, at Hyde Park Barracks.

Farriers traditionally combined veterinary knowledge with blacksmiths' skills. They were responsible for hoof trimming and fitting horseshoes to horses. They also dealt with the "humane dispatch of wounded and sick horses", accomplished with the large spike on the end of their axes. Then they used the sharp blade of the axe to chop off the deceased animal's hoof, which was marked with its regimental number. This assisted in keeping track of animals killed in action.

Although the axes are not used any more, army farriers still carry these axes, with their characteristic highly polished blade and spike, at ceremonial events such as Trooping the Colour.

In The Blues and Royals, the farriers dress like their comrades in regimental uniform. The distinctive uniform and equipment of the farriers of The Life Guards—blue tunic, black plume and axe—is a historic reminder of the old British Army of the days of James Wolfe. Every cavalry regiment in the Army, other than the Royal Horse Guards (The Blues), originally wore scarlet for all ranks, except the farriers. Farriers were garbed invariably in sombre blue and bore axes, worn at the side, like the swords of their comrades. When on parade, the troopers drew swords, the Farriers drew axes and carried them at the "Advance".

Following every parade is a duty horse-box, known as the Veterinary Aid Post, with a specialist emergency team in attendance.

== Band ==
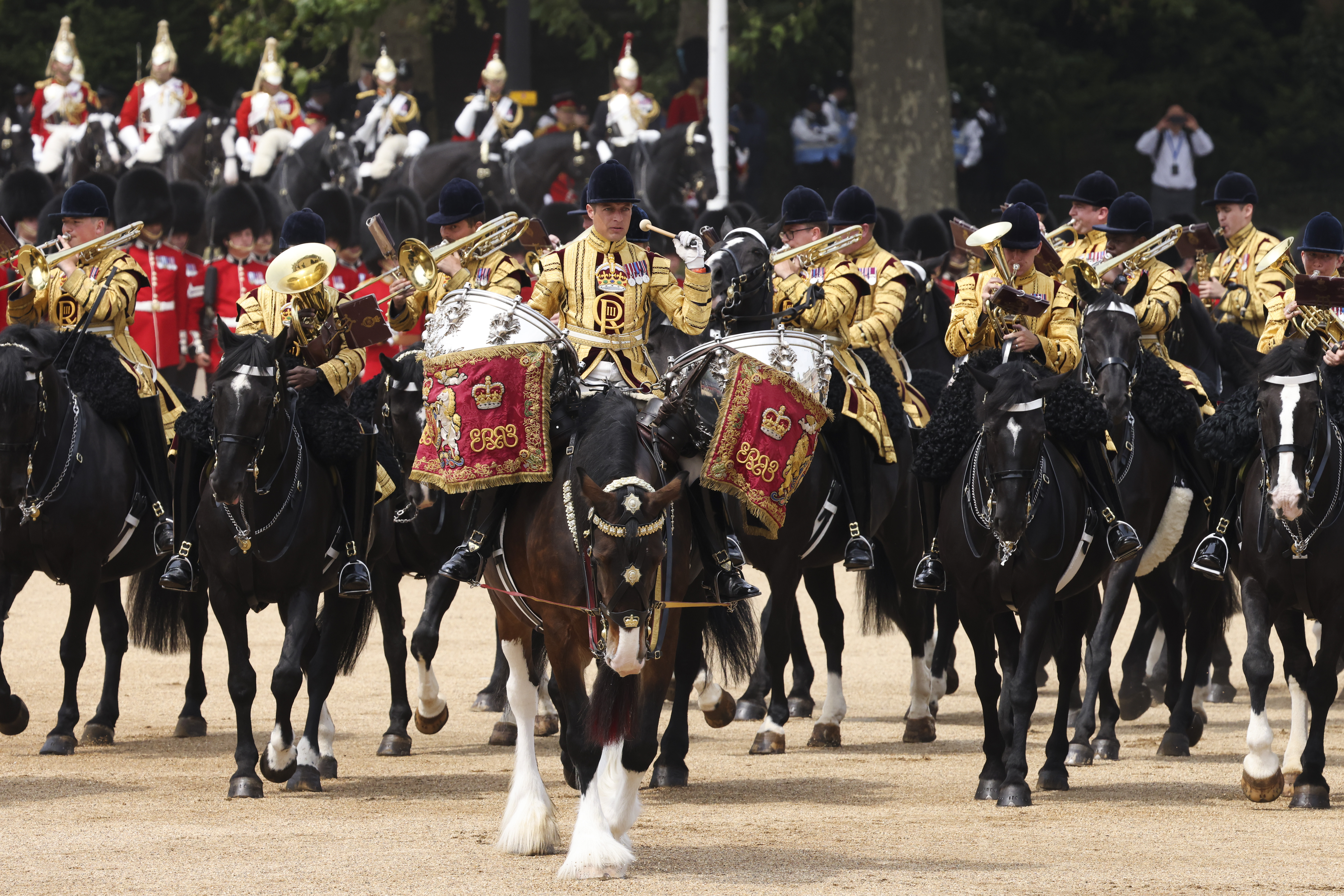
The Band at the King's Birthday Parade, 2023.

The Mounted Band of the Household Cavalry was a merger in 2014 of the 35 piece Band of The Blues and Royals and the 35 piece Band of The Life Guards. They are now one band of 64 musicians but wear the uniform of both The Blues and Royals and The Life Guards. They come under RCAM, the Royal Corps of Army Music. They also provide State Trumpeters for events of state.

== Musical Ride ==
The Musical Ride of the Mounted Regiments of the Household Cavalry was first performed at the Royal Tournament in 1882. The two trumpeters sitting on grey horses were historically intended to form a contrast with the darker horses, so that they could be seen on battlefields when relaying officers' commands to the troops. The troops weave around the trumpeters and the celebrated drumhorse, Spartacus.

== Order of precedence ==
In the British Army Order of Precedence, the Household Cavalry is always listed first and always parades at the extreme right of the line, save in cases that the guns of the Royal Horse Artillery are to be first in line during parades.

Preceded by Royal Horse Artillery (with guns)	Order of Precedence	Succeeded by Royal Horse Artillery (without guns)

== Notable incidents ==
In April 2024, after being spooked by falling concrete during their daily morning exercise, five horses unseated their riders and went on a panicked flight through central London. Colliding with vehicles and pedestrians, two of the horses suffered serious injuries. Three soldiers were among those injured and were taken to hospital.

== The Household Cavalry Foundation ==
The Household Cavalry is supported by the Household Cavalry Foundation, the regimental charity, which raises funds in aid of five core themes: casualties, veterans, serving soldiers, horses and heritage.

== The Household Cavalry Regiment Museum ==
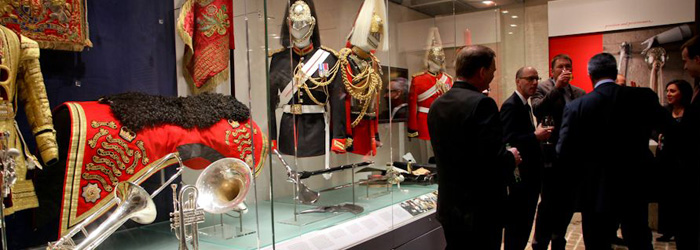
A reception at the Household Cavalry Museum, Horse Guards.

The Household Cavalry has two museums. The Household Cavalry Museum is located at Horse Guards Parade in central London, where the HCMR mounts the King's Life Guard. The museum is a very popular tourist attraction with digital audio guides in several languages. The museum includes a window into the working stables of the King's Life Guard, allowing visitors to watch ongoing care of the horses throughout the day. Separately, the Household Cavalry Regiment has its own museum at Combermere Barracks in Windsor. A volunteer team organise tours and events and, in particular, administer the regiment's extensive material, documentary and photographic archives. The museum is open to public groups, by appointment.

== Notable members ==
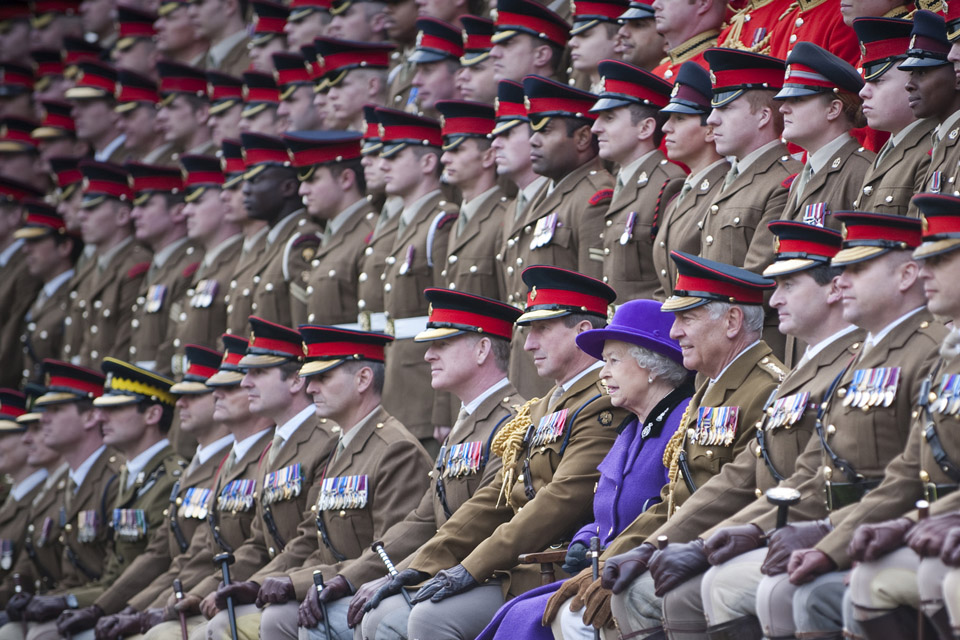
Queen Elizabeth II with soldiers of the Household Cavalry

- James Blount 1997–2002, stage name James Blunt (Life Guards), singer-songwriter
- Jack Charlton 1953–1955, (Royal Horse Guards), footballer
- Tommy Cooper 1940–1947, (Royal Horse Guards), comedian
- Christopher Finney 2002–2009 (Blues and Royals), soldier
- Michael Flynn (Blues and Royals), soldier
- Elizabeth Godwin (Life Guards)
- Craig Harrison (Blues and Royals)
- Jack Higgins 1947–1950 (Blues and Royals), author
- Victor McLaglen (Life Guards), film actor
- Ray Milland 1925–1928 (Royal Horse Guards The Blues), film actor
- Lord Rupert Nevill (Life Guards), Private Secretary to Prince Philip, Duke of Edinburgh
- Andrew Parker Bowles 1960–1994, (Blues and Royals)
- Albert Spencer, 7th Earl Spencer (1st Life Guards, then Life Guards), paternal grandfather to Diana, Princess of Wales
- Prince Harry, Duke of Sussex (Blues and Royals)
- The Prince of Wales 2006–2008, (Blues and Royals)

=== Colonels commanding Household Cavalry ===
These have included:

- 1959–1960: Colonel the Marquess of Douro
- 1960–1964: Colonel the Hon. Julian Berry
- 1964–1966: Colonel David J. St.M. Tabor
- 1966–1969: Colonel Harry S. Hopkinson
- 1969–1972: Colonel Ian B. Baillie
- 1972–1975: Colonel H. Desmond A. Langley
- 1975–1978: Colonel James A. C. G. Eyre
- 1978–1981: Colonel Simon C. Cooper
- 1981–1982: Colonel Andrew J. Hartigan
- 1982–1986: Colonel James G. Hamilton-Russell
- 1986–1987: Colonel James B. Emson
- 1987–1990: Colonel Andrew H. Parker Bowles
- 1990–1993: Colonel Jeremy D. Smith-Bingham
- 1993–1997: Colonel Peter B. Rogers
- 1997–1999: Colonel P. Simon W.F. Falkner
- 1999–2000: Colonel W. Toby Browne
- 2000–2005: Colonel Hamon P.D. Massey
- 2005–2009: Colonel Patrick J. Tabor
- 2009–2010: Colonel W. Toby Browne
- 2010–2014: Colonel Stuart H. Cowen
- 2014–2019: Major-General Sir Edward Smyth-Osbourne
- 2019–2022: Colonel Crispin Lockhart, MBE
- 2022–present: Colonel M. S. P. Berry

=== Monument ===
In the center of the village of Zandvoorde, Zonnebeke in Belgium, there is a British war memorial, The Household Cavalry Monument, commemorating the role of the Household Cavalry in the battles of the First World War in this area.

== See also ==
- Barnsby Saddles (1793)
- Household Cavalry Museum
- Household Cavalry Coach Troop
- Household Division
- President's Bodyguard
- King's Guard
- Trooping the Colour
