= Household Cavalry Mounted Regiment =

British Army unit

The Household Cavalry Mounted Regiment
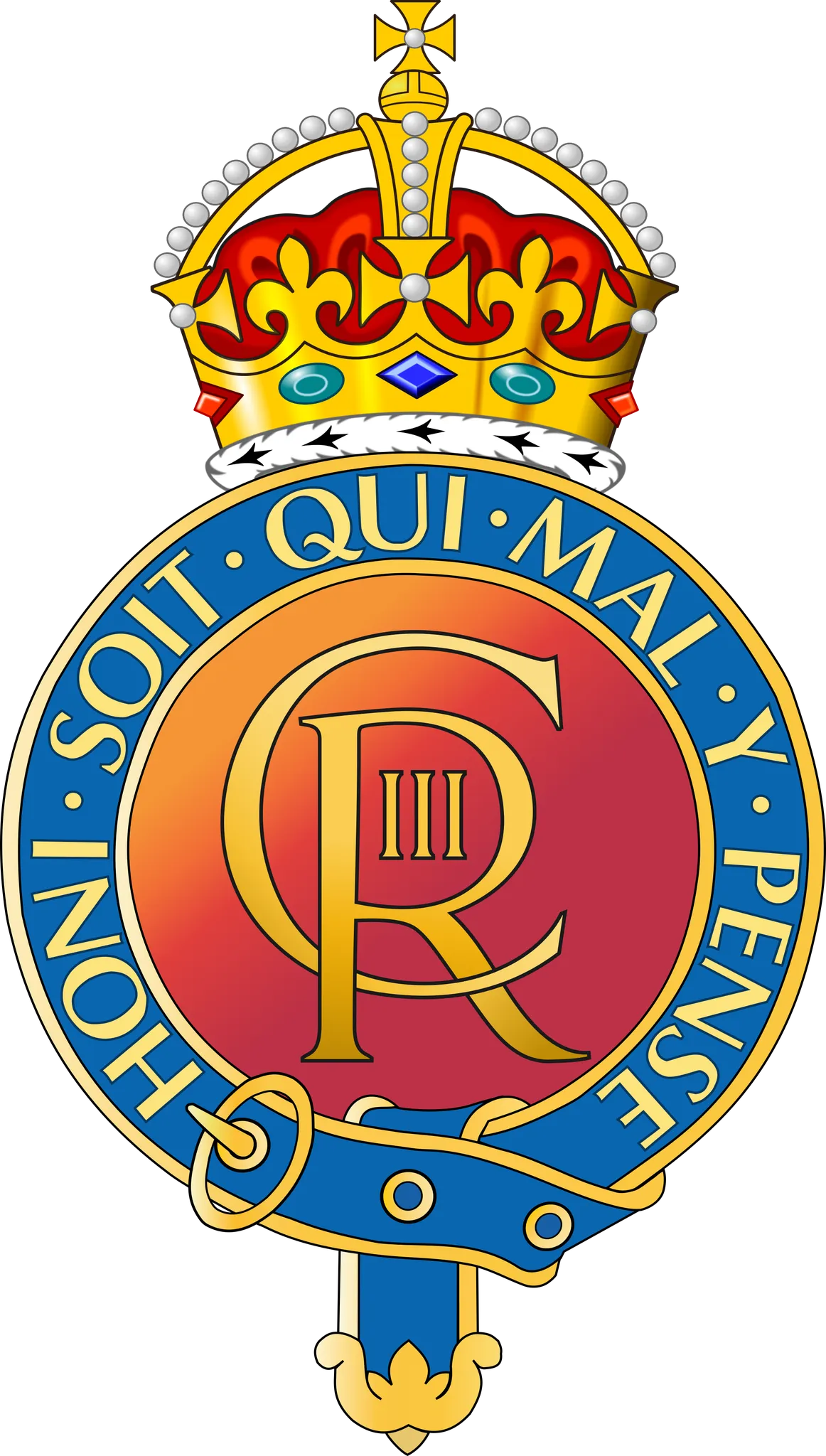
- Badge of the Household Cavalry
- Active: 1945–Present
- Country: United Kingdom
- Branch: British Army
- Type: Horse Guards
- Role: Public duties/ceremonial
- Size: Regiment; 341 personnel 250 horses
- Part of: Household Cavalry
- Garrison/HQ: Hyde Park Barracks, London
- Mottos: Honi soit qui mal y pense (Middle French for 'Shame on him who thinks evil of it')
- March: Life Guards: Quick - Millanollo; Slow - Life Guards Slow March; Trot Past - Keel Row; Blues and Royals: Quick - Quick March of the Blues and Royals; Slow - Slow March of the Blues and Royals; Trot Past - Keel Row

Commanders
- Colonel-in-Chief: Charles III

The Household Cavalry Mounted Regiment (HCMR) is a cavalry regiment of the British Army tasked primarily with ceremonial duties. Part of the Household Division, it is classed as a regiment of guards, and carries out mounted (and some dismounted) ceremonial duties on State and Royal occasions. The HCMR is one of two operational units that form the Household Cavalry (HCav), the other being the Household Cavalry Regiment (HCR), an armoured cavalry regiment, with front-line combat duties.

== History ==
In 1945, following the end of the Second World War, the 1st and 2nd Household Cavalry Regiments were reformed as The Life Guards and Royal Horse Guards respectively. Along with these changes, each regiment provided a mounted squadron for ceremonial duties in London. These two squadrons were grouped as the Household Cavalry Mounted Regiment. By 1991, this regiment was based at Knightsbridge Barracks (also known as Hyde Park Barracks [built between 1967 and 1970]), in Central London. The regiment continues to be based at the location.

== Establishment ==
It consists of one sabre squadron from each regiment of the Household Cavalry (the Life Guards and the Blues and Royals) plus a Headquarters Squadron, and the Household Cavalry Training Wing. This has been based (in various forms) at Hyde Park Barracks, Knightsbridge, since 1795. This is three-quarters of a mile from Buckingham Palace, close enough for the officers and men of the Household Cavalry to be available to respond speedily to any emergency at the Palace and also to conduct their ceremonial duties.

The Household Cavalry Coach Troop is a unit of the Mounted Regiment based at Combermere Barracks in Windsor. It consists of six carriages with six horses, a head coachman, a second coachman and three grooms.

== Public duties ==
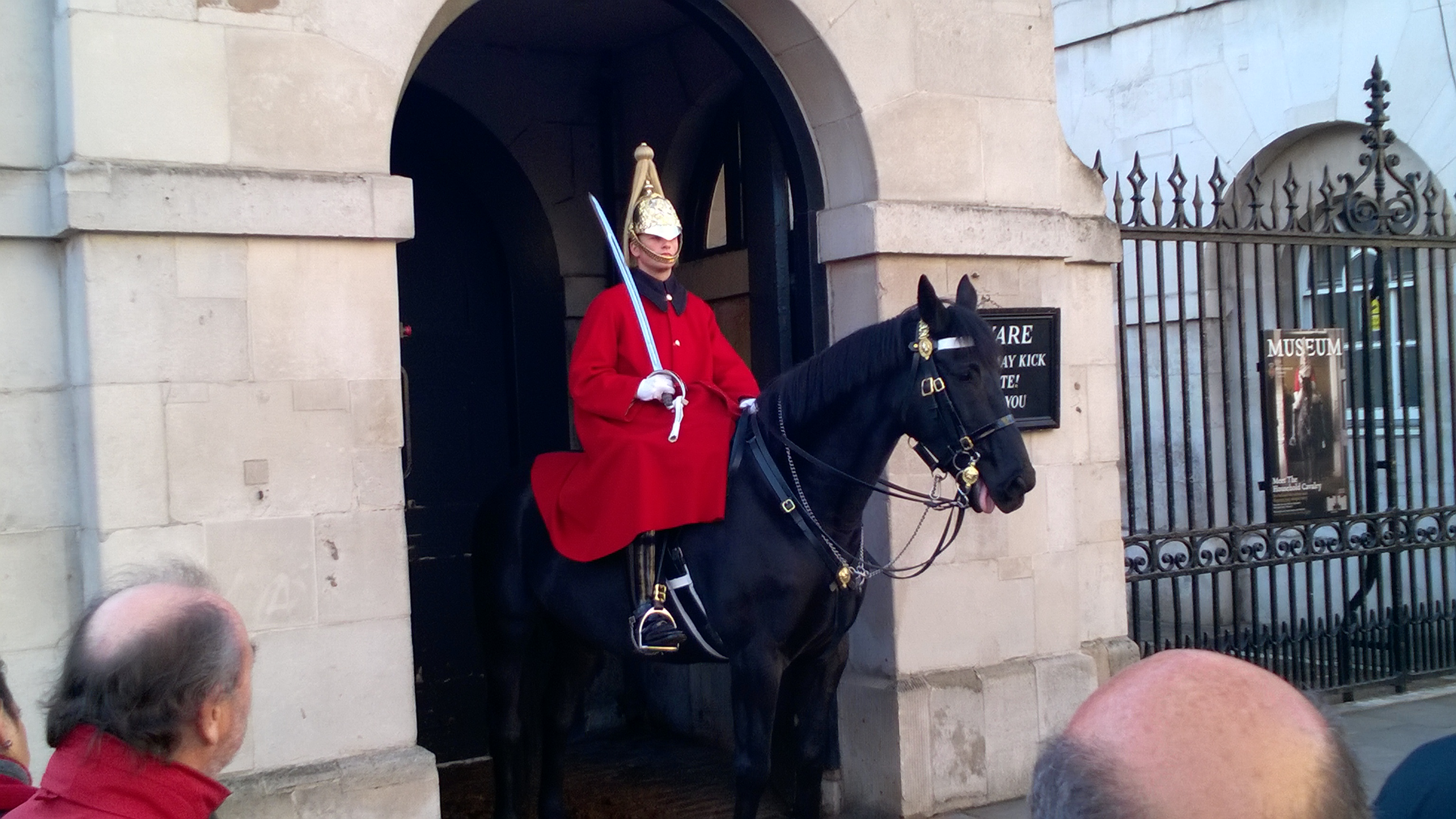
A sentry of the Life Guards outside Horse Guards

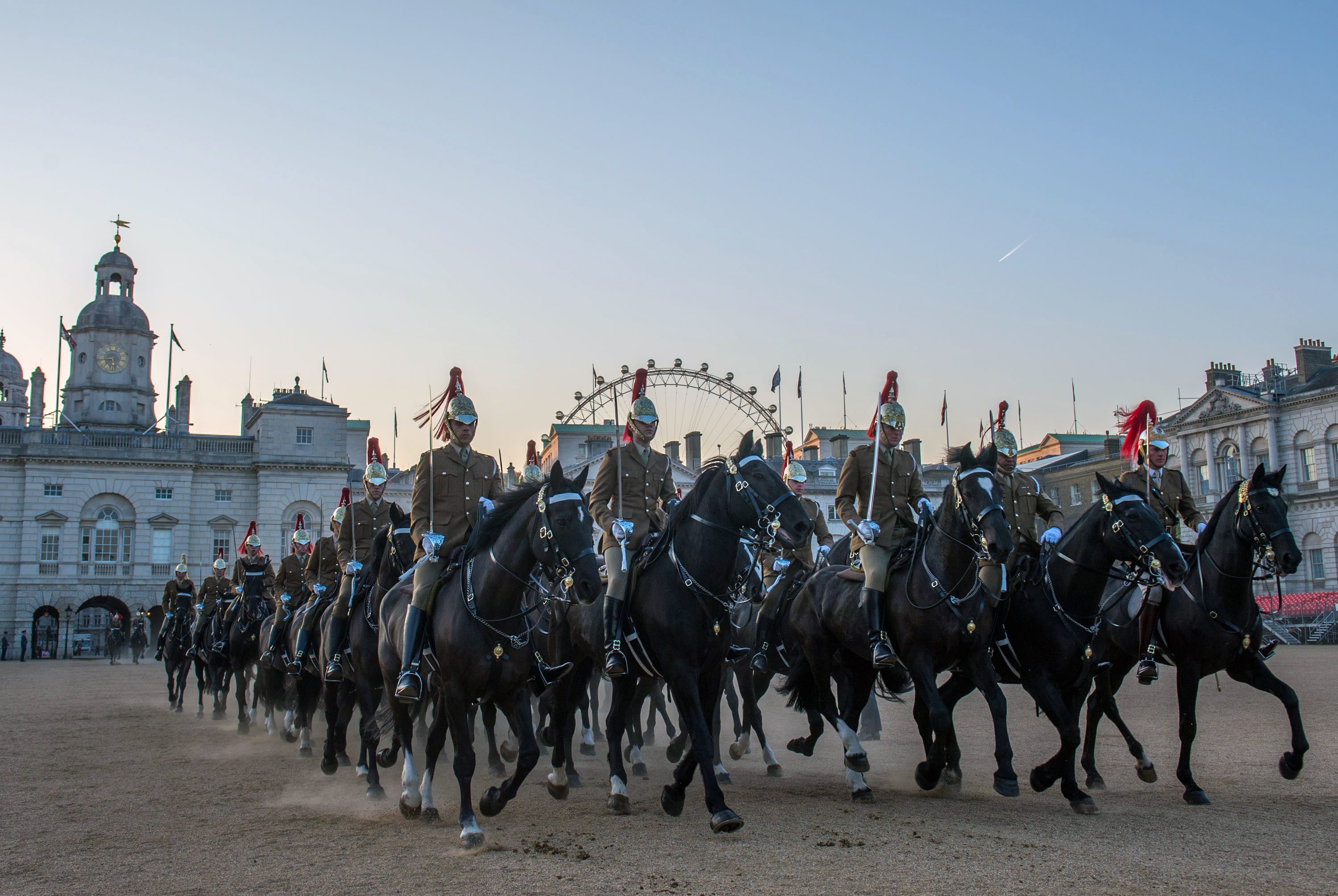
The Monarch's escort for the State Opening of Parliament is provided by the HCMR.

The Household Cavalry Mounted Regiment carries out regular ceremonial duties throughout the year. As the Sovereign's bodyguard and part of the Household Division, the HCMR mounts a daily guard (called King's Life Guard) at Horse Guards, which is the historical and ceremonial entrance to Buckingham Palace. This ceremony can be viewed daily by members of the public. The HCMR is responsible for the provision of the Sovereign's Escort, most commonly seen at the monarch's annual Birthday Parade (Trooping the Colour) in June each year. The escort is also seen at other occasions, including during state visits by visiting heads of state, or whenever required by the British monarch. The regiment provides a staircase party inside Buckingham Palace at state Investitures, and inside the Palace of Westminster at the annual State Opening of Parliament. They are also present at the annual Garter Ceremony at Windsor Castle. Perhaps most famously, in recent years, the men and women of the Household Cavalry have provided an escort for Queen Elizabeth II, both in London and to her final resting place at her home of Windsor Castle in September 2022. Then it provided an escort for the subsequent coronation of Charles III in May 2023.

== Musical ride ==
The Household Cavalry Musical Ride has been performed at agricultural shows, military tattoos since the 1880s. The display is often accompanied by the drum horses and mounted State Trumpeters of The Mounted Band of The Household Cavalry. During the display, it is usually recorded music of that band. The Musical Ride demonstrates the skills that were required by cavalry in times of war. The display was a firm favourite at the Royal Tournament, where it was first performed in 1882, the Musical Ride was performed at the last Royal Tournament in 1999. Since 2010, it has also performed at the British Military Tournament.

== Band ==
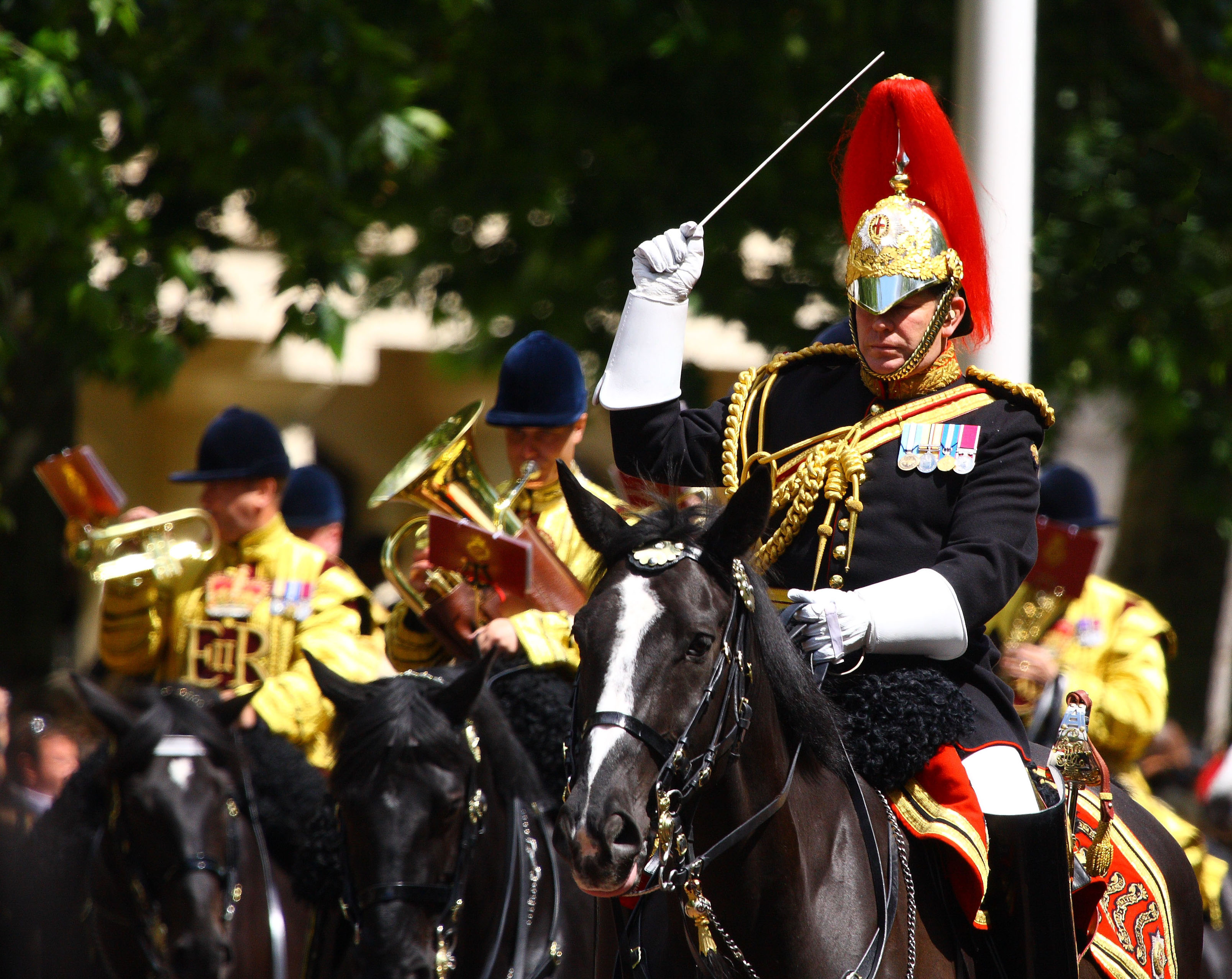
Major Tim Cooper, Director of Music of The Blues and Royals conducting the Mounted Band of The Blues and Royals

The Mounted Band of The Household Cavalry was a merger in 2014 of the 35 piece Band of The Blues and Royals and the 35 piece Band of The Life Guards. They are now one band of 64 musicians but wear the uniform of both The Blues and Royals and The Life Guards. They come under RCAM, the Royal Corps of Army Music. They also provide State Trumpeters.

== Alliances and twinnings ==
- Royal Navy – HMS Westminster
- France – Cavalry Regiment of the French Republican Guard

== See also ==
- Household Cavalry Regiment
- Household Cavalry Coach Troop
- Republican Guard (France)
