= Blues and Royals =

Regiment of the British Army

The Blues and Royals (Royal Horse Guards and 1st Dragoons)
- Badge of the regiment
- Active: 29 March 1969–present
- Country: United Kingdom
- Branch: British Army
- Type: Horse guards
- Role: Armoured reconnaissance and ceremonial
- Size: Regiment
- Part of: Household Cavalry
- Garrison/HQ: RHQ – London; Regiment – Windsor/London
- Mottos: Honi soit qui mal y pense (Middle French for "Shame on anyone who thinks evil of it")
- March: Quick – "Quick March of the Blues and Royals"; Slow – "Slow March of the Blues and Royals"; Trot Past – "Keel Row"
- Engagements: Falklands War; Mount Kent Skirmish; Battle of Wireless Ridge
- Battle honours: Pre-First World War: Tangier 1662–1680; Dettingen; Warburg; Beaumont; Willems; Fuentes d'Onor; Peninsula; Waterloo; Balaclava; Sevastopol; Tel el Kebir; Egypt 1882; Relief of Ladysmith; South Africa 1899–1902; First World War: Mons; Le Cateau; Retreat from Mons; Marne 1914; Aisne 1914; Messines 1914; Armentières 1914; Ypres 1914; Langemarck 1914; Gheluvelt; Nonne Bosschen; St Julien; Ypres 1915; Frezenberg, Loos; Arras 1917; Scarpe 1917; Ypres 1917; Broodseinde; Poelcappelle; Passchendaele; Somme 1918; St Quentin; Avre; Amiens; Hindenburg Line, Beaurevoir; Cambrai 1918, Sambre; Pursuit to Mons; France and Flanders 1914–18; Second World War: Mont Pincon; Souleuvre; Noireau Crossing; Amiens 1944; Brussels; Neerpelt; Nederrijn; Lingen; Veghel; Nijmegen; Rhine; Bentheim; North-West Europe 1944–1945; Baghdad 1941; Iraq 1941; Palmyra; Syria 1941; Msus; Gazala; Knightsbridge; Defence of Alamein Line; El Alamein; El Agheila; Advance on Tripoli; North Africa 1941–43; Sicily 1943; Arezzo; Advance to Florence; Gothic Line; Italy 1943–44; Post-Second World War; Falkland Islands 1982; Iraq 2003

Commanders
- Colonel-in-Chief: Charles III
- Colonel of the Regiment: Anne, Princess Royal

Insignia
- Tactical Recognition Flash
- Arm Badge: Waterloo Eagle (from 1st The Royal Dragoons)
- Abbreviation: RHG/D

The Blues and Royals (Royal Horse Guards and 1st Dragoons) (RHG/D) is a cavalry regiment of the British Army, part of the Household Cavalry. The Colonel of the Regiment is Anne, Princess Royal. It is the second-most senior regiment in the British Army.

== History ==
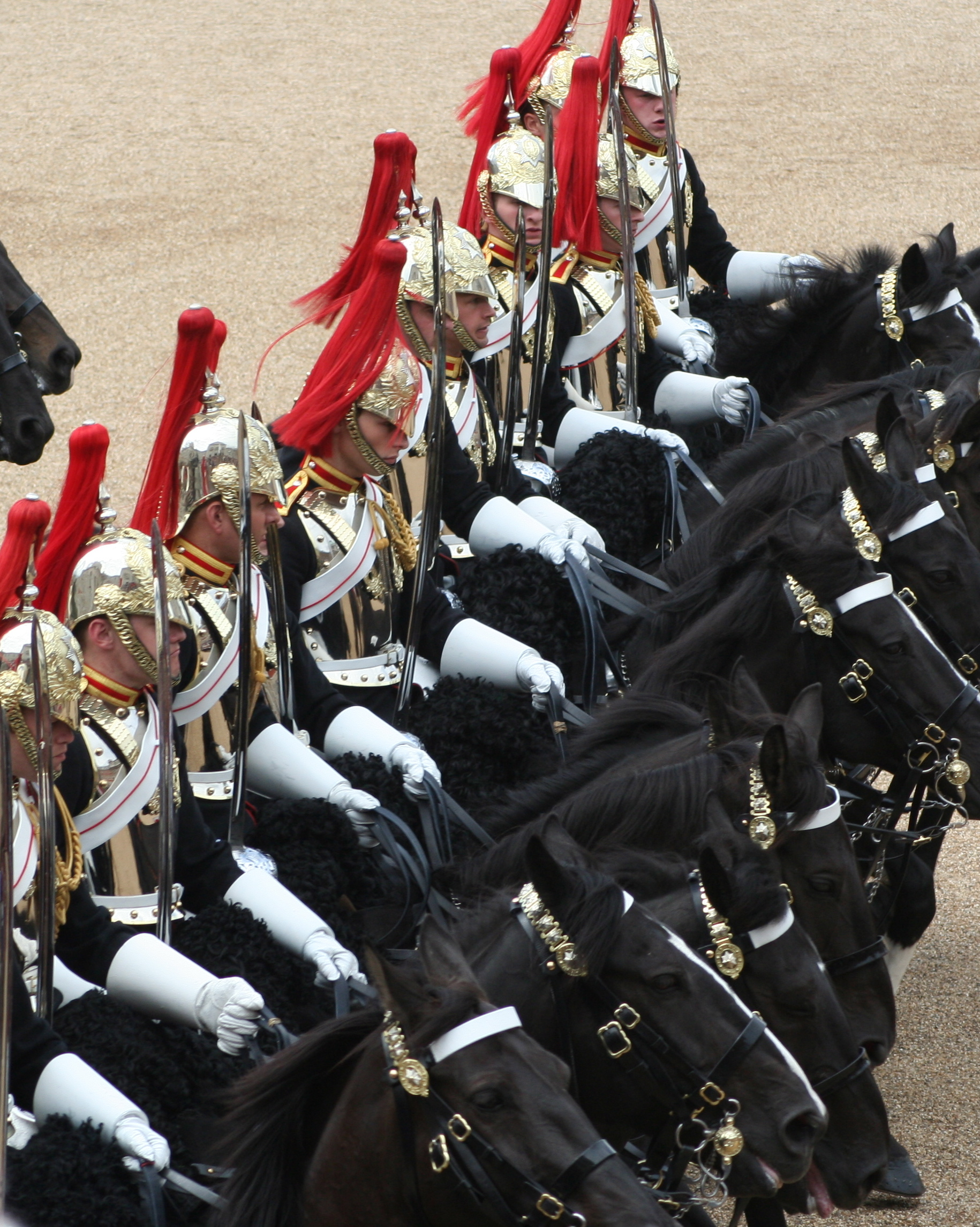
Troopers of the Blues and Royals at the Trooping the Colour parade, London, 2007

=== Formation and service ===
The regiment was formed in 1969 from the merger of the Royal Horse Guards, which was known as "the Blues" or "the Oxford Blues", and the Royal Dragoons, which was known as "the Royals". Of these, the Blues were founded as a unit of the New Model Army, having been raised in 1650 by Sir Arthur Haselrig on orders from Oliver Cromwell; it was incorporated into the Restoration army in 1660 and gained the title "Royal" in the 18th century. The Royal Dragoons were formed shortly after the Restoration, in 1661, composed of cavalry veterans of the New Model Army.

Since formation in 1969, the new regiment has served in several countries. From 1969 the regiment had troops deployed to Northern Ireland as part of Operation Banner. In the 1970s and 1980s, during the Cold War, the Regiment was headquartered at Detmold in West Germany and was a unit of the British Army of the Rhine's 20th Armoured Brigade, part of the 3rd Armored Division with an armoured and reconnaissance role.

During that time it was tasked with defending part of the North German Plain in the event of an invasion by the Warsaw Pact. During the Falklands War of 1982, the regiment provided the two armoured reconnaissance troops. The regiment also had a squadron on operational duty with the United Nations in Bosnia in 1994–95. Most recently, the regiment saw action in the Iraq War and the War in Afghanistan.

Both Prince William and Prince Harry joined the regiment as cornets in 2006.

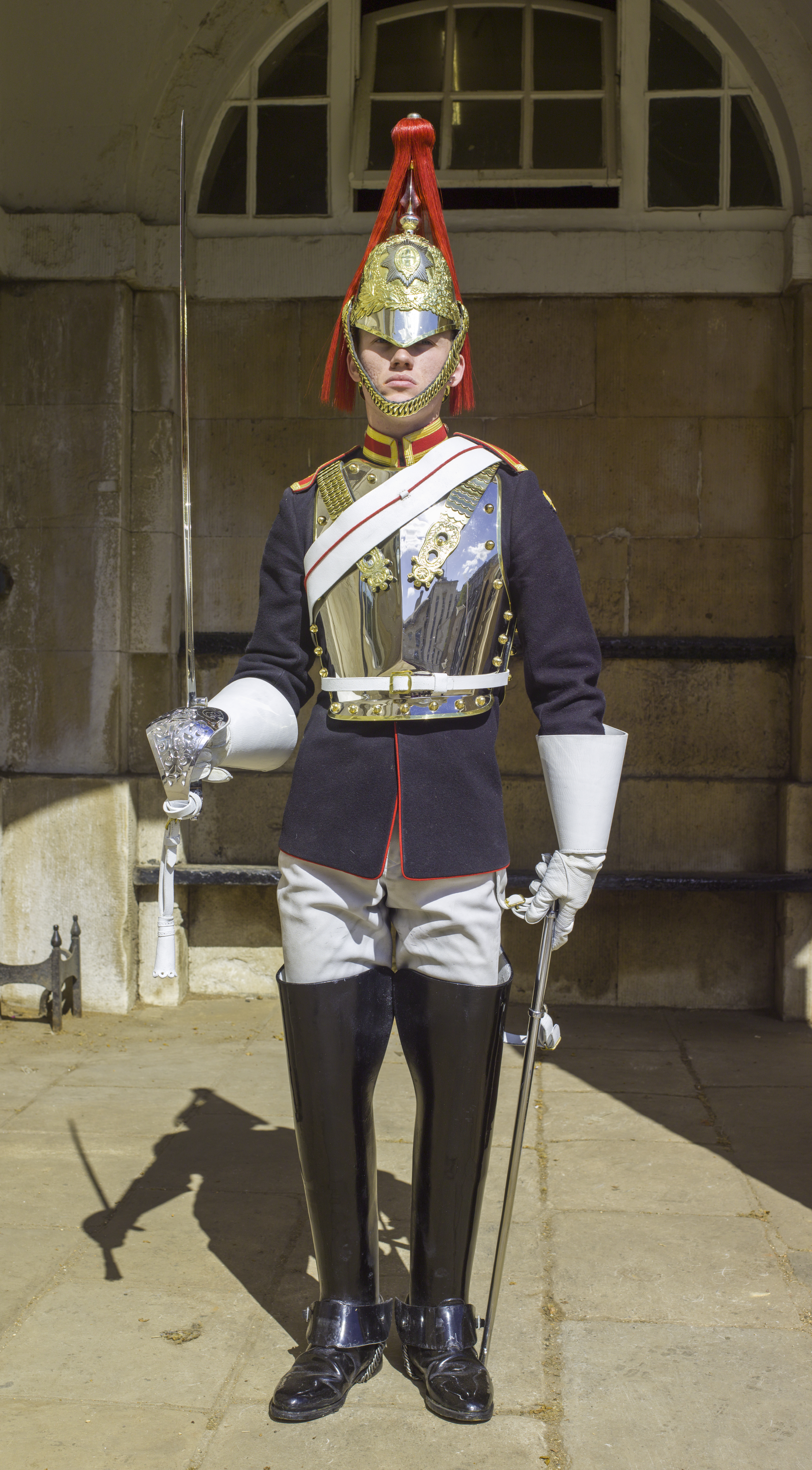
Blues and Royals trooper

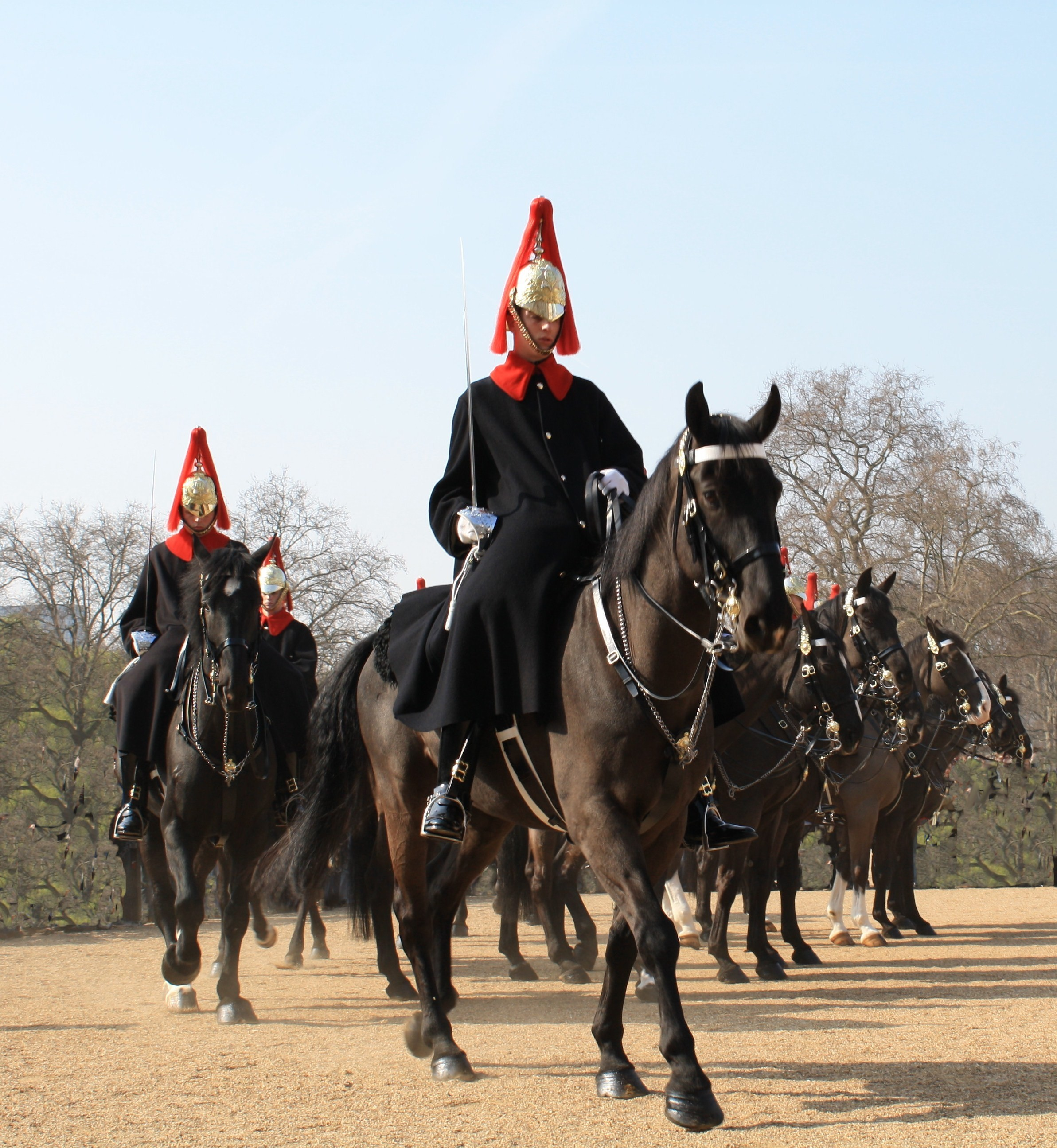
Changing of the guard at Horse Guards

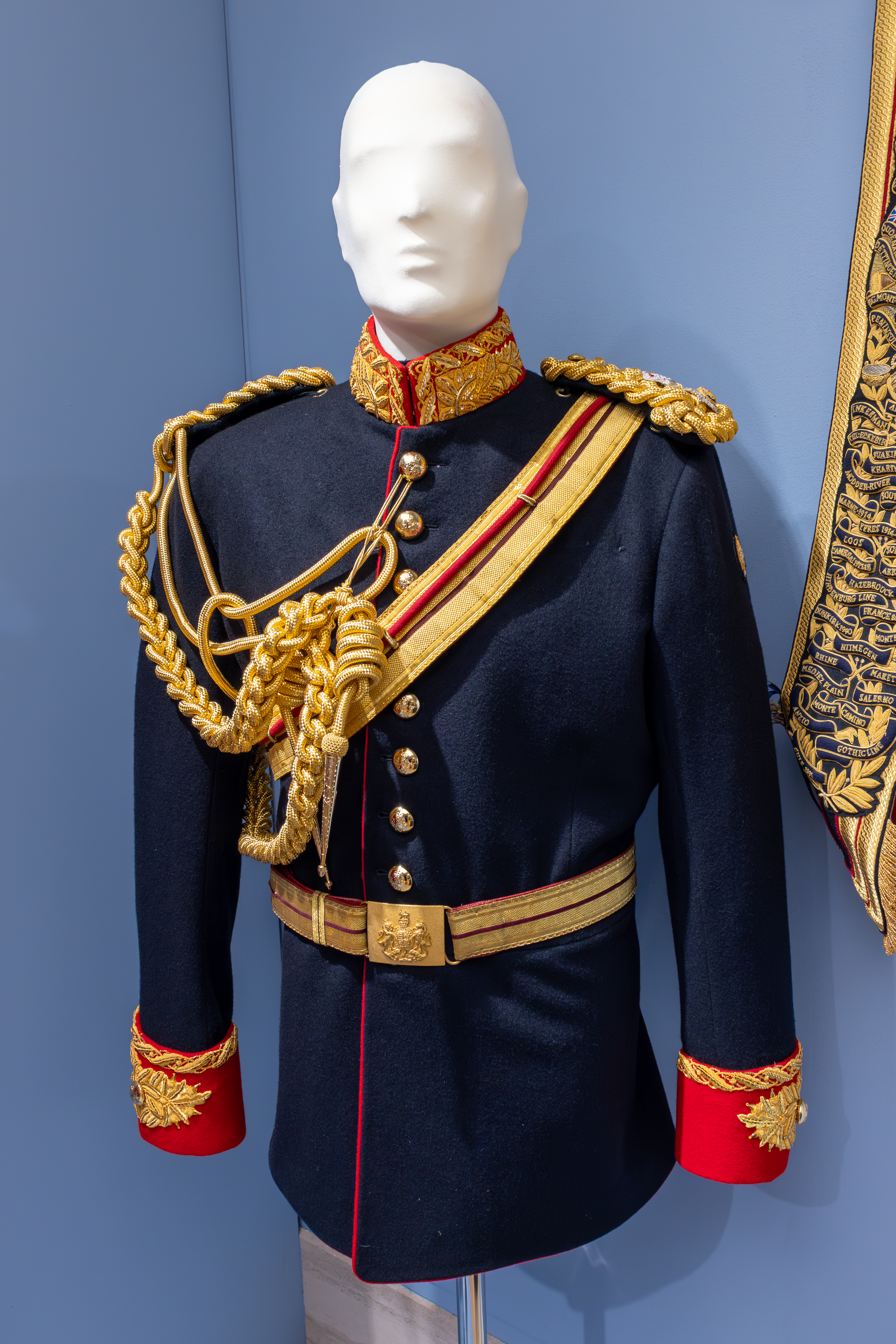
Full dress tunic worn by a Blues and Royals officer

=== Operational union ===
As a result of the Options for Change Review in 1991, The Blues and Royals formed a union for operational purposes with the Life Guards as the Household Cavalry Regiment. However, they each maintain their regimental identity, with distinct uniforms and traditions, and their own colonel. The Blues and Royals currently has two reconnaissance squadrons in Windsor, which are part of the Household Cavalry Regiment, and a mounted squadron in London as part of the Household Cavalry Mounted Regiment, performing ceremonial and public duties.

== Regimental traditions ==
Instead of being known as the Royal Horse Guards and 1st Dragoons, the regiment is known as The Blues and Royals and is therefore the only regiment in the British Army to be officially known by its nickname as opposed to its full name.

Newly commissioned officers in the Blues and Royals have the rank of Cornet, rather than Second Lieutenant as is the standard in the rest of the British Army. There is no sergeant rank in the Household Cavalry; the equivalent of a sergeant in another unit is Corporal of Horse; the equivalent of Regimental Sergeant Major is Regimental Corporal Major, etc. King Edward VII established that the rank of private should be replaced by the rank of trooper in the cavalry.

The Blues and Royals is the only regiment in the British Army that allows troopers and non-commissioned officers, when not wearing headdress, to salute an officer. The custom started after the Battle of Warburg in 1760 by John Manners, Marquess of Granby, who commanded both the Royal Horse Guards and the Royal Dragoons, which were separate units at the time. During the battle, the Marquess had driven the French forces from the field, losing both his hat and his wig during the charge. When reporting to his commander, Prince Ferdinand of Brunswick, in the heat of the moment he is said to have saluted without wearing his headdress, having lost it earlier. When the Marquess of Granby became the Colonel of the Blues, the regiment adopted this tradition.

When the Household Cavalry mounts an escort to the Sovereign on State occasions, a ceremonial axe with a spike is carried by a Farrier Corporal of Horse. The historical reason behind this is that when a horse was wounded or injured so seriously that it could not be treated, its suffering was ended by killing it with the spike. The axe is also a reminder of the days when the Sovereign's escorts accompanied royal coaches and when English roads were very bad. Horses often fell, becoming entangled in their harnesses and had to be freed with the cut of an axe. It is also said that in those times, if a horse had to be killed, its rider had to bring back a hoof, cut off with the axe, to prove to the Quartermaster that the animal was dead and hence preventing fraudulent replacement. Today, the axe remains as a symbol of the Farrier's duties.

== Uniform ==
The Blues and Royals wear their chin strap under their chin, as opposed to the Life Guards, who wear it below their lower lip. On service dress, the Blues and Royals wear a blue lanyard on the left shoulder, as well as a Sam Browne belt containing a whistle. In most dress orders, the Waterloo Eagle is worn on the left arm as part of dress traditions. The Blues and Royals, as part of the Household Division, does not use the Order of the Bath Star for its officer rank "pips", but rather the Order of the Garter Star.

Prince Harry wore the uniform at the wedding of his brother, Prince William, to Catherine Middleton. Both Prince Harry and Prince William also received permission from the Queen to wear the frock coat version of the uniform to Harry's wedding to Meghan Markle.

The modern mess dress worn by officers of the regiment reflects the traditions of the Royal Dragoons and includes a scarlet jacket with dark blue facings.

== Commanding officers ==
The commanding officers have been:

- Lt Col Richard M. H. Vickers: March 1969–December 1970
- Lt Col James A. C. G. Eyre: December 1970–July 1973
- Lt Col William S. H. Boucher: July 1973–October 1975
- Lt Col John H. Pitman: October 1975–February 1978
- Lt Col Henry O. Hugh Smith: February 1978–April 1980
- Lt Col James G. Hamilton-Russell: April 1980–October 1982
- Lt Col Jeremy D. Smith-Bingham: October 1982–April 1985
- Lt Col Hywel W. Davies: April 1985–August 1987
- Lt Col Timothy J. Sulivan: August 1987–January 1990
- Lt Col Peter B. Rogers: January 1990–October 1992

== Colonels-in-chief ==
Since the merger, the regiment's colonel-in-chief has always been the monarch, as follows:

- 1969–2022: Queen Elizabeth II
- 2022–present: King Charles III

== Regimental colonels ==
The regiment's colonels were as follows:

- 1969–1979: Field Marshal Sir Gerald Templer (formerly Colonel of Royal Horse Guards),

- Deputy Colonel: General Sir Desmond Fitzpatrick (formerly Colonel of 1st The Royal Dragoons)

- 1979–1998: General Sir Desmond Fitzpatrick
- Since 1998: General Anne, Princess Royal

== Battle honours ==
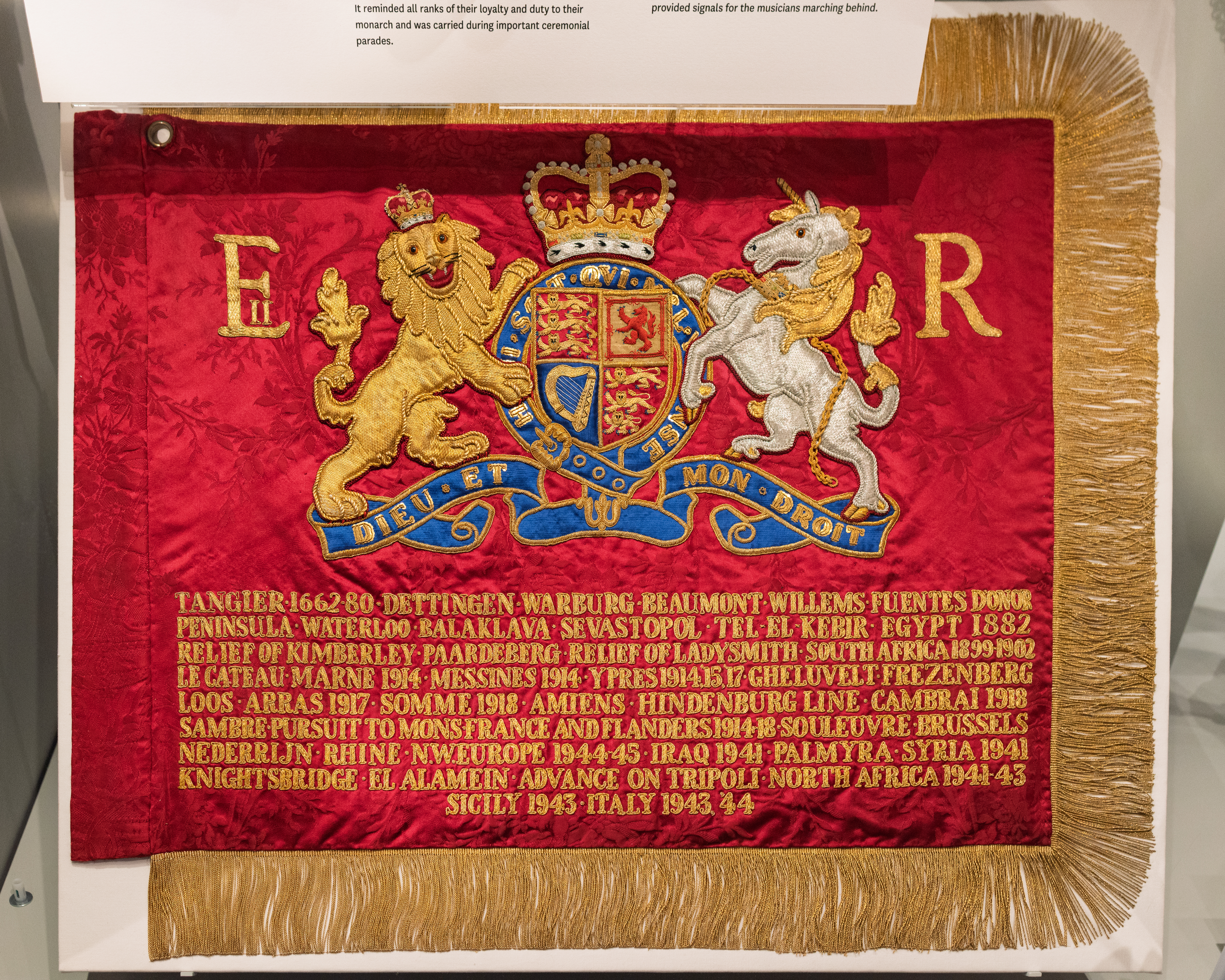
Standard presented to The Blues and Royals by Elizabeth II c. 1973 listing battle honours

The battle honours are:

- Tangier 1662–1680, Dettingen, Warburg, Beaumont, Willems, Fuentes d'Onor, Peninsula, Waterloo, Balaclava, Sevastopol, Tel el Kebir, Egypt 1882, Relief of Ladysmith, South Africa 1899–1902
- The Great War: Mons, Le Cateau, Retreat from Mons, Marne 1914, Aisne 1914, Messines 1914, Armentières 1914, Ypres 1914, Langemarck 1914, Gheluvelt, Nonne Bosschen, St Julien, Ypres 1915, Frezenberg, Loos, Arras 1917, Scarpe 1917, Ypres 1917, Broodseinde, Poelcappelle, Passchendaele, Somme 1918, St Quentin, Avre, Amiens, Hindenburg Line, Beaurevoir, Cambrai 1918, Sambre, Pursuit to Mons, France and Flanders 1914–18
- The Second World War: Mont Pincon, Souleuvre, Noireau Crossing, Amiens 1944, Brussels, Neerpelt, Nederrijn, Lingen, Veghel, Nijmegen, Rhine, Bentheim, North-West Europe 1944–1945, Baghdad 1941, Iraq 1941, Palmyra, Syria 1941, Msus, Gazala, Knightsbridge, Defence of Alamein Line, El Alamein, El Agheila, Advance on Tripoli, North Africa 1941–43, Sicily 1943, Arezzo, Advance to Florence, Gothic Line, Italy 1943–44
- Falkland Islands 1982
- Iraq 2003*

*Awarded jointly with the Life Guards for services of the Household Cavalry Regiment

== Order of precedence ==
| Preceded by Life Guards | Cavalry Order of Precedence | Succeeded by 1st The Queen's Dragoon Guards |
