= Hyde Park Barracks, London =

British army base in central London, England

Hyde Park Barracks
- Part of London Garrison
- Westminster, London in England
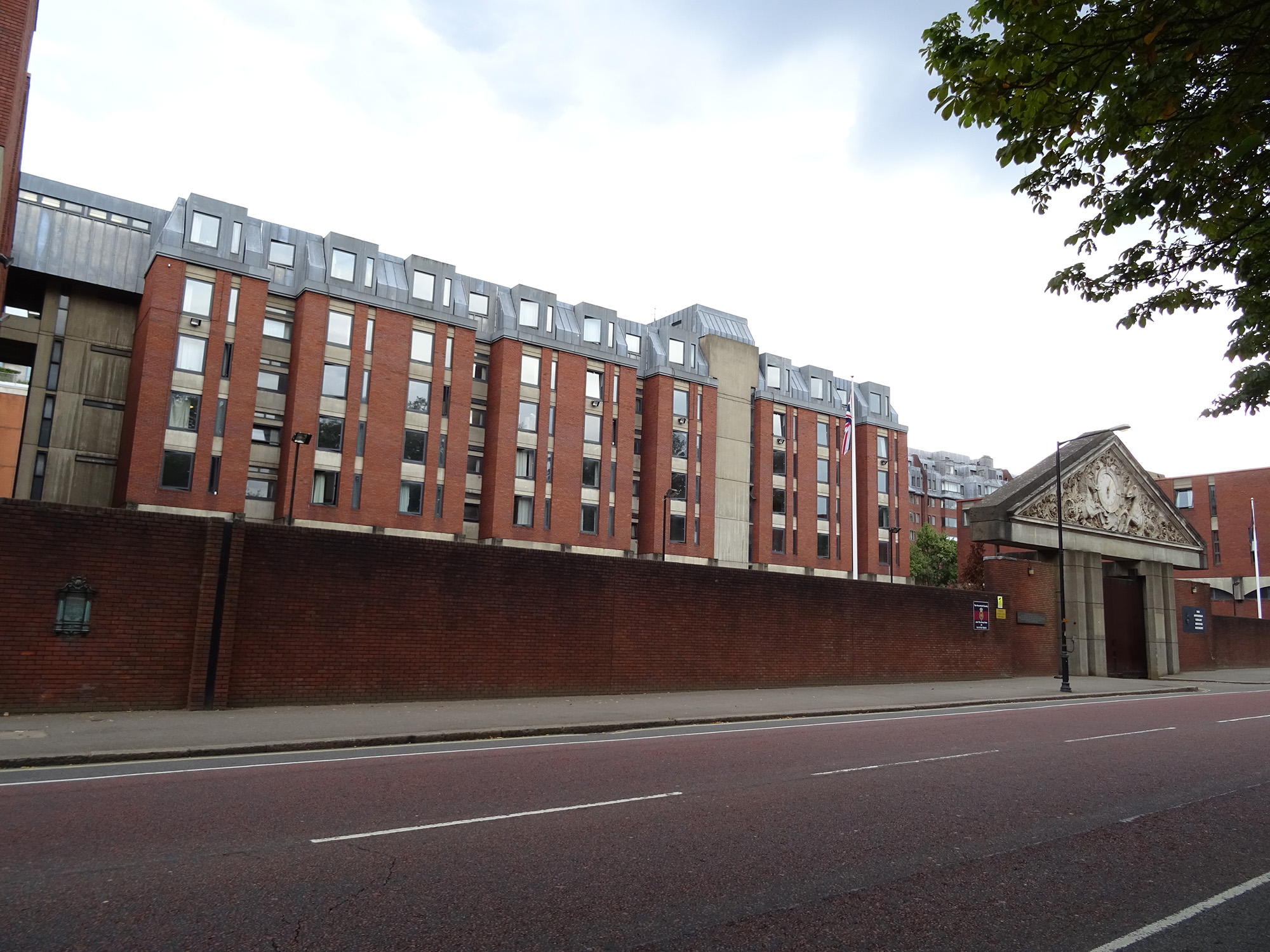
- Hyde Park Barracks seen from South Carriage Drive

Site information
- Type: Army barracks
- Owner: Ministry of Defence
- Operator: British Army
- Controlled by: London District
- Condition: Operational

Location
- Location within London
- Coordinates: 51°30′7″N 0°10′0″W
- Area: 1 hectare (2.5 acres)

Site history
- Built: 1795; 1880; 1970
- Built for: War Office
- In use: 1795 – present

Garrison information
- Garrison: Household Cavalry Mounted Regiment

The Hyde Park Barracks are in Knightsbridge in the City of Westminster, on the southern edge of Hyde Park. They were often known as Knightsbridge Barracks and this name is still sometimes used informally. The barracks are 3/4 mile (1.2 km) from Buckingham Palace, enabling the officers and soldiers of the Household Cavalry to be available to respond speedily to any emergency at the Palace, practice drills at Horse Guards Parade or beyond and conduct other more ceremonial duties.

== History ==
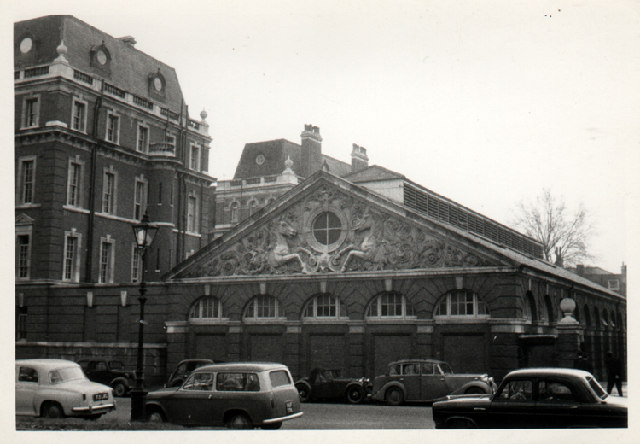
Knightsbridge Barracks in 1959

Its first buildings were constructed for the Horse Guards in 1795, and a riding school and stables designed by Philip Hardwick were added in 1857. These were replaced with new ones designed by Thomas Henry Wyatt on which construction started in 1878 and was completed in May 1880.

These were in turn demolished to make way for modernist buildings by Sir Basil Spence, completed in 1970. It was built to accommodate 23 officers, 60 warrant officers and non-commissioned officers, 431 rank and file, and 273 horses. The most prominent feature is a 33-storey, 94-metre (308 ft) residential tower, which is one of the two most prominent modern buildings as seen from Hyde Park along with the London Hilton on Park Lane. It was built by Sir Robert McAlpine between 1967 and 1970.

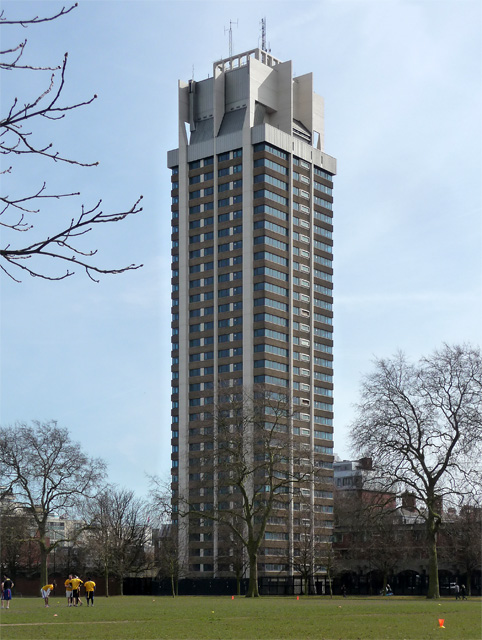
Hyde Park Barracks Tower, designed by Sir Basil Spence

The barracks are the base for the Household Cavalry Mounted Regiment, which is horsed and carries out mounted (and some dismounted) ceremonial duties on state and royal occasions in London. These duties include the provision of a Sovereign's Escort, most commonly seen at the Sovereign's Birthday Parade (Trooping the Colour) in June each year. Other occasions include important ceremonies that take place during state visits by visiting heads of state, or whenever required by the British monarch. The regiment also mounts the King's Life Guard at Horse Guards, which consists of one squadron from each regiment.

In April 2024, horses belonging to the barracks escaped, bolting after being spooked by construction noises. The horses collided with pedestrians and vehicles. Two of the horses reached as far as Limehouse. The horses involved recovered from their injuries and, after a short break with the Horses Trust, all were due to return to ceremonial duty.

On 1 July 2024, three horses bolted from their riders with one of the horses receiving minor injuries. None of the horses were involved in the previous April 2024 incident.

== Reception ==
The building has been described by the magazine, Country Life, as "dramatically modern and uncompromising", but many people have viewed it less favourably; it was voted number eight in a Country Life poll of Britain's "top ten eyesores". Lord St John of Fawsley remarked that "Basil Spence's barracks in Hyde Park ruined that park; in fact, he has the distinction of having ruined two parks, because of his Home Office building, which towers above St. James's Park".

Critic A. A. Gill described the Barracks as the ugliest building in London, and said that Spence "managed to construct vertical bomb damage out of horizontal bomb damage."

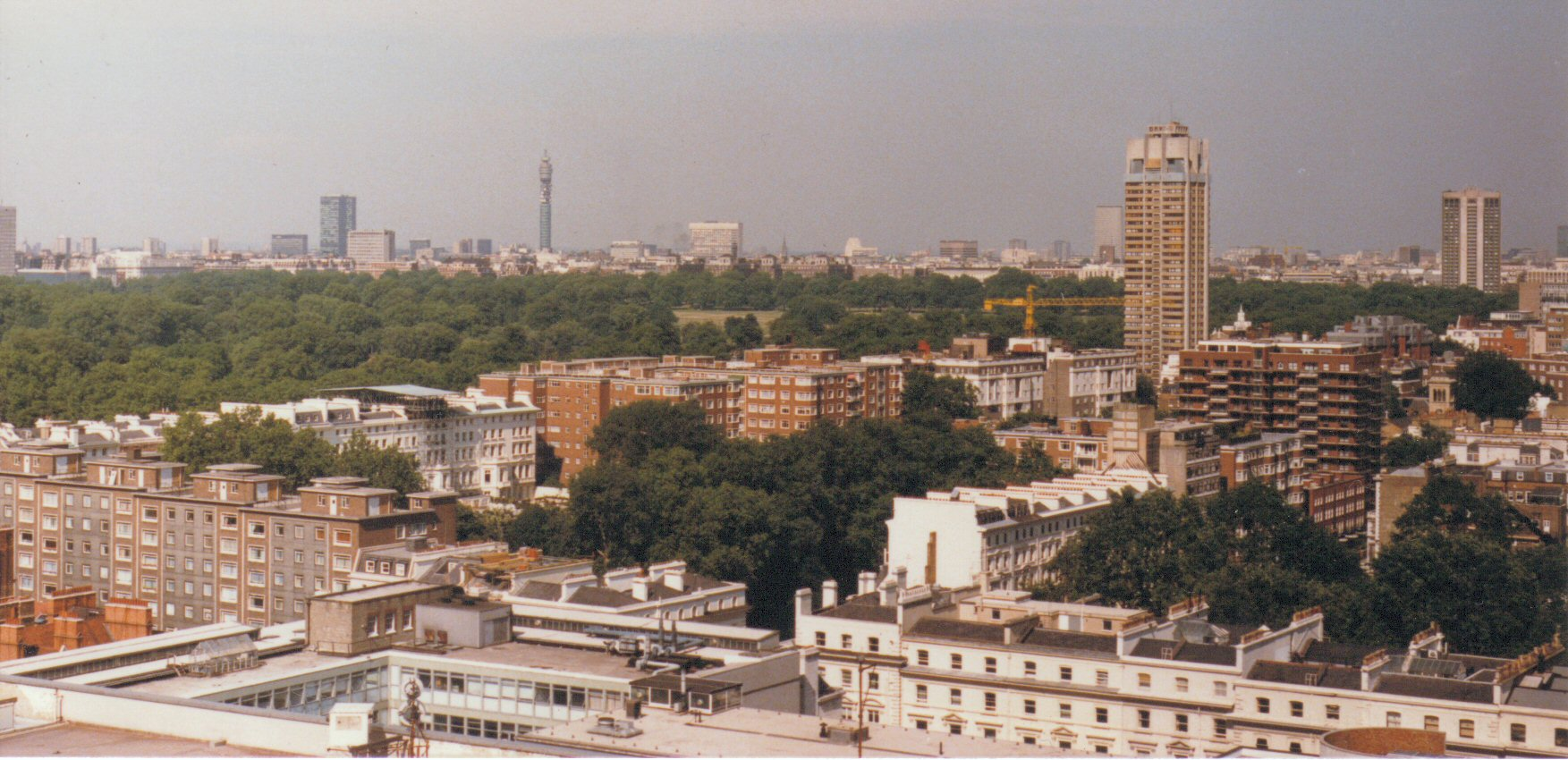
Semi-panorama north-east towards Hyde Park and the barracks

'I did not want this to be a mimsy-pimsy building', Spence is reported as saying. 'It is for soldiers. On horses. In armour'. He also felt that a tower would cut out less light to the park than a slab block, and would block fewer upper-storey views of the Royal Park from buildings to the south.

In 2015 the C20 charity which campaigns for the preservation of architectural heritage applied to have the building listed. Their bid was endorsed by Historic England, but was rejected by Culture minister Tracey Crouch. In August 2026 a certificate of immunity from listing was issued for the Barracks.

== Based units ==
The following notable unit is based at Hyde Park Barracks.

=== British Army ===
Household Cavalry

- Household Cavalry Mounted Regiment

== See also ==
- List of British Army installations
