= List of marches of the British Armed Forces =

The following is a list of official marches of the British Armed Forces.

For the marches of the regiments of the British Army at the start of World War II (1939) see Regimental marches of the British Army

== Royal Navy ==
- Royal Navy – Heart of Oak (Quick); Westering Home (Slow)
- Royal Marines – A Life on the Ocean Wave (Quick); Preobrazhensky (Slow), The Globe and Laurel (Inspection March)
- Royal Marines Commandos – Sarie Marais

== British Army ==
- Household Cavalry
  - The Life Guards – Milanollo (Quick); Life Guards Slow March (Slow)
  - The Blues and Royals (Royal Horse Guards and 1st Dragoons) – Quick March of the Blues and Royals (Quick); Slow March of the Blues and Royals (Slow)
- Royal Horse Artillery – Bonnie Dundee (Gallop); Keel Row (Trot); The Duchess of Kent (walk)
- Royal Armoured Corps
  - 1st The Queen's Dragoon Guards – Rusty Buckles/Radetzky March (Quick); 1st Dragoon Guards and 2nd Dragoon Guards Slow March (Slow)
  - The Royal Scots Dragoon Guards (Carabiniers and Greys) – The 3DGs (Quick); The Garb of Auld Gaul (Slow)
  - The Royal Dragoon Guards – Fare Thee Well Inniskilling (Quick); 4th Dragoon Guards/7th Dragoon Guards (Slow)
  - The Queen's Royal Hussars (Queen's Own and Royal Irish) – Regimental Quick March of the Queen's Royal Hussars (Quick); 3rd Hussars Slow March/Litany of Loretto/The Garb of Auld Gaul/March of the Scottish Archers (Slow)
  - The Royal Lancers (Queen Elizabeth's Own) – Wellington (Quick); Coburg (Slow)
  - The King's Royal Hussars – The King's Royal Hussars (Quick); Coburg (Slow)
  - The Light Dragoons – Balaklava (Quick); Denmark (Slow)
  - The Royal Tank Regiment – My Boy Willie (Quick); The Royal Tank Regiment Slow March (Slow)
  - The Royal Yeomanry – Farmer's Boy (Quick)
  - The Royal Wessex Yeomanry - God Bless The Prince of Wales (Quick)
  - The Queen's Own Yeomanry – D'ye ken John Peel (Quick)
- Royal Artillery – Voice Of The Guns (Quick); The Duchess of Kent (Slow)
- Royal Engineers – Wings/The British Grenadiers
- Royal Corps of Signals – Begone Dull Care (Quick), HRH The Princess Royal (Slow)
- Infantry
  - Grenadier Guards – The British Grenadiers (Quick); Scipio (Slow), The Duke of York (Slow)
  - Coldstream Guards – Milanollo (Quick); Figaro (Slow)
  - Scots Guards – Hielan' Laddie (Quick); The Garb of Old Gaul (Slow)
  - Irish Guards – St Patrick's Day (Quick); Let Erin Remember (Slow)
  - Welsh Guards – Rising of the Lark (Quick); Men of Harlech (Slow)
  - The Royal Regiment of Scotland – Scotland the Brave (Quick); Royal Regiment of Scotland Slow March (Slow)
  - The Princess of Wales's Royal Regiment (Queen's and Royal Hampshires) – The Farmer's Boy/Soldiers of the Queen (Quick); The Minden Rose (Slow)
  - The Duke of Lancaster's Regiment (King's, Lancashire and Border) – King's Own Royal Border Regiment March (De ye ken John Peel) (Quick); The Red Rose (Slow)
  - The Royal Regiment of Fusiliers – The British Grenadiers (Quick); Rule Britannia (Slow)
  - The Royal Anglian Regiment – Rule Britannia/Speed the Plough (Quick); The Northamptonshire (Slow)
  - The Yorkshire Regiment (14th/15th, 19th and 33rd/76th Foot) – Ça Ira (Quick); The Duke of York (Slow)
  - The Mercian Regiment (Cheshire, Worcesters & Foresters, and Staffords) – Wha Wadna Fecht for Charlie/Under the Double Eagle (Quick); Stand Firm and Strike Hard (Slow)
  - The Royal Welsh – Men of Harlech (Quick); Forth to the Battle (Slow)
  - The Royal Irish Regiment (27th (Inniskilling), 83rd, 87th and Ulster Defence Regiment) – Killaloe (Quick); Eileen Alannah (Slow);
  - The Parachute Regiment – Ride of the Valkyries (Quick); Pomp and Circumstance No 4 (Slow)
  - The Royal Gurkha Rifles – Bravest of the Brave (Quick); God Bless the Prince of Wales (Slow); Keel Row (Double Past)
  - The Rifles – Mechanised Infantry (Quick); Old Salamanca (Slow); Keel Row/Road to the Isles (Double Past)
- The Special Air Service – Marche des Parachutistes Belges (Quick); Lili Marlene (Slow)
- Army Air Corps – Recce Flight (Quick); Thievish Magpie (based on La gazza ladra) (Slow)
- Special Reconnaissance Regiment - Argus
- Royal Army Chaplains' Department – Prince of Denmark's March (Trumpet Voluntary)
- Royal Logistic Corps – On Parade (Quick); Lion, Sword and Crown (Slow)
- Royal Army Medical Service – Here's a Health unto His Majesty
- Royal Electrical and Mechanical Engineers – Lilliburlero/Auprès de ma blonde (Quick); Duchess of Kent (Slow)
- Adjutant General's Corps – Pride of Lions (Quick); Greensleeves (Slow)
  - Royal Military Police - The Watchtower
  - Military Provost Staff - The Metropolitan
  - Army Legal Services Branch - Scales of Justice
- Royal Army Veterinary Corps – Drink Puppy Drink/A Hunting We Will Go (Quick); Golden Spurs (Slow)
- Small Arms School Corps – March of the Bowmen
- Intelligence Corps – Rose and Laurel (Quick); Trumpet Tune and Air (Slow)
- Royal Army Physical Training Corps – Be Fit
- Royal Corps of Army Music – The Music Maker (Quick); Esprit De Corps (Slow)
- Honourable Artillery Company – The British Grenadiers (Quick);The Duke of York (Slow); Bonnie Dundee (Canter); Keel Row (Trot); The Duchess of Kent (Walk)

== Royal Air Force ==
- Royal Air Force – Royal Air Force March Past (Quick); Saeculum (Slow)
- Royal Air Force Regiment – Holyrood (Quick); Centurion (Slow)
- Royal Air Force Police – Royal Air Force Police March Past
- Princess Mary's Royal Air Force Nursing Service – Skywards
- Royal Observer Corps – Skywatch
