= Regimental marches of the British Army =

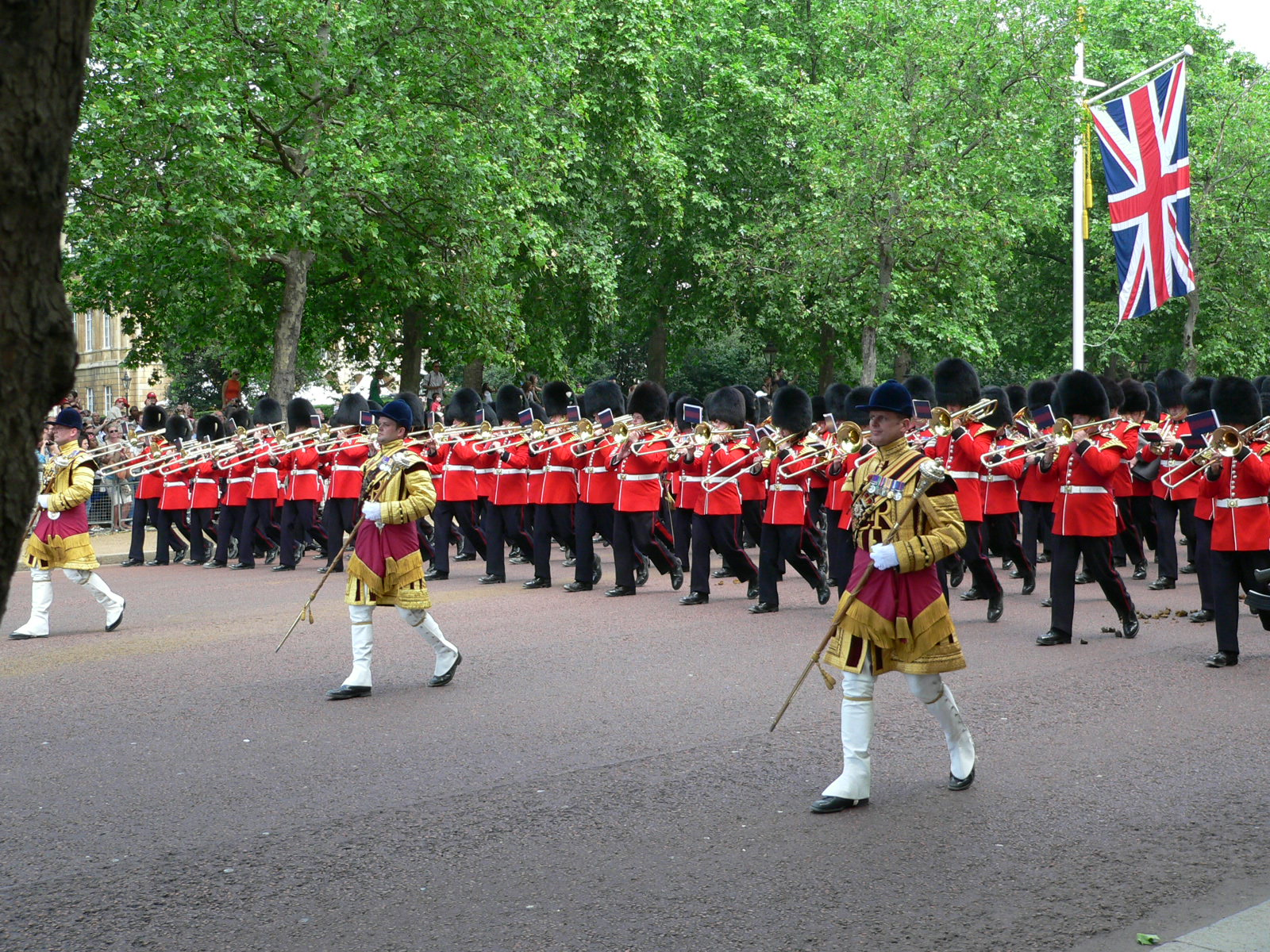
The 5 regiments of the Foot Guards have their own regimental marches, that are each performed by their respective regimental bands.

The following is a list of the notable Regimental Marches for military regiments of the British Army. In addition, all regiments have additional pieces for slow marches, marches for mounted parades and pipe marches.

== Units in 1940 ==
=== Regular Army ===
Life Guards :- - Milanollo

Royal Horse Guards :- - Aida, Duchess of Kent

1st King's Dragoon Guards :- - The Radetsky March

Queen's Bays (2nd Dragoon Guards) :- - Rusty Buckles

3rd Carabiniers (Prince of Wales's Dragoon Guards) :- - Carabinier's March

4th/7th Royal Dragoon Guards :- - St Patrick's Day (former 4th Dragoon Guards had been the Royal Irish)

5th Royal Inniskilling Dragoon Guards :- - Soldier's chorus (Faust), Sprig of Shillelagh

1st Royal Dragoons :- - 1st Dragoons, Soldier's chorus (Faust),

Scots Greys (2nd Dragoons):- - Walk: The Garb of Old Gaul

- - Trot: The Keel Row
- - Canter: Bonnie Dundee
- - Dismounted: Highland Laddie

3rd The King's Own Hussars :- - Quick: Robert the Devil

- - Slow: The 3rd Hussars

4th Queen's Own Hussars :- - Quick: Berkeley's Dragoons

- - Slow: Litany of Loretto

7th Queen's Own Hussars :- - The Bannocks Of Barley Meal

8th King's Royal Irish Hussars :- - The Galloping 8th Hussar

9th Queen's Royal Lancers :- - Men of Harlech

10th Royal Hussars :- - The Merry Month Of May

11th Hussars (Prince Albert's Own) :- - Moses in Egypt

12th Royal Lancers (Prince of Wales's) :- - Coburg March

13th/18th Royal Hussars (Queen Mary's Own) :- - none

14th/20th Hussars :- - none

15th/19th The King's Royal Hussars :- - Elliot's Light Horse

16th/5th The Queen's Royal Lancers :- - St Patrick's Day (former 5th Lancers had been Royal Irish)

17th/21st Lancers :- - White Lancers

Royal Tank Regiment :- - My Boy Willie

Royal Artillery :- - British Grenadiers, Keel Row, Bonnie Dundee, Duchess of Kent

Royal Engineers :- - British Grenadiers, Wings

Royal Corps of Signals :- - Begone Dull Care

Grenadier Guards :- - Slow: Scipio Quick: British Grenadiers

Coldstream Guards :- - Slow: Figaro Quick: Milanollo

Scots Guards:- - Quick: Highland Laddie

- - Slow: Garb of Old Gaul

Irish Guards :- - Slow: Let Erin Remember Quick: St Patrick's Day

Welsh Guards :- - Slow: Men of Harlech, Quick: Rising of the Lark

Royal Scots (Royal Regiment):- - Quick: Dumbarton's Drums

- - Slow: Garb of Old Gaul
- - When Royalty present: The Daughter of the Regiment (commemorating the birth of Queen Victoria, daughter of the regimental colonel, Prince Edward, Duke of Kent and Strathearn)

Queen's Royal Regiment (West Surrey) :- - We'll gang nae mair to yon toun, Braganza

The Buffs (Royal East Kent Regiment) :- - The Buffs

King's Own Royal Regiment (Lancaster) :- - Corn Riggs are Bonny, Shall Trelawny Die?

Royal Northumberland Fusiliers :- - British Grenadiers

Royal Warwickshire Regiment :- - Warwickshire Lads

Royal Fusiliers (City of London Regiment) :- - British Grenadiers, 7th Royal Fusiliers

King's Regiment (Liverpool) :- - Here's to the Maiden of Bashful Fifteen

Royal Norfolk Regiment :- - Rule Britannia

Lincolnshire Regiment :- - Lincolnshire Poacher

Devonshire Regiment :- - We've Lived & Loved Together, Widdicombe Fair

Suffolk Regiment :- - Speed the Plough

Somerset Light Infantry (Prince Albert's) :- - Prince Albert's March

West Yorkshire Regiment (Prince of Wales's Own) :- - Ça Ira

East Yorkshire Regiment :- - Yorkshire Lass

Bedfordshire and Hertfordshire Regiment :- - Mountain Rose, Mandolinata

Leicestershire Regiment :- - Romaika, A Hunting Call

Green Howards (Alexandra PoW's Own Yorkshire) :- - Bonnie English Rose

Lancashire Fusiliers :- - The Minden March

Royal Scots Fusiliers:- - Band: British Grenadiers

- - Pipes: Highland Laddie

Cheshire Regiment :- - Wha wadna fetch for Charlie?

Royal Welch Fusiliers :- - British Grenadiers, Men of Harlech

South Wales Borderers :- - Men of Harlech

King's Own Scottish Borderers:- - Blue Bonnets O'er the Border

Cameronians (Scottish Rifles):- - Band: Within a mile of Edinboro's Town

- - Pipes: 1st Bn: Kenmuir's On An' Awa'
- - 2nd Bn: The Gathering of the Grahams

Royal Inniskilling Fusiliers :- - British Grenadiers, Sprig of Shilelagh

Gloucestershire Regiment :- - Kynegad Slashers, Highland Piper

Worcestershire Regiment :- - Royal Windsor

East Lancashire Regiment :- - Lancashire Lads, The Attack

East Surrey Regiment :- - Quick: A Southerly Wind and a Cloudy Sky

- - Slow: Lord Charles Montague's The Huntingdonshire March

Duke of Cornwall's Light Infantry :- - One and All/Trelawny

Duke of Wellington's Regiment (West Riding) :- - The Wellesley

Border Regiment :- - John Peel

Royal Sussex Regiment :- - The Royal Sussex

Hampshire Regiment :- - The Hampshires, Highland Piper

South Staffordshire Regiment :- - Come Lassies & Lads

Dorsetshire Regiment :- - The Dorsetshires

Prince of Wales's Volunteers (South Lancashire Regiment) :- - South Lancashires, God Bless the Prince of Wales

Welch Regiment :- - Ap Shenkin

Black Watch (Royal Highland Regiment):- - Blue Bonnets over the Border, Highland Laddie

Oxfordshire & Buckinghamshire Light Infantry :- - Nachtlager in Grenada, Lower Castle Yard

Essex Regiment :- - The Essex, Highland Piper

Sherwood Foresters :- - Young May Moon

Loyal Regiment (North Lancashire) :- - The Red Rose

Northamptonshire Regiment :- - The Northamptonshires

Royal Berkshire (Princess Charlotte of Wales) :- - Dashing White Sergeant

Queen's Own Royal West Kent Regiment :- - A Hundred Pipers

King's Own Yorkshire Light Infantry :- - Jockey of York, Jockey to the Fair

King's Shropshire Light Infantry :- - Old Towler

Middlesex Regiment (Duke of Cambridge's Own) :- - Lass o' Gowrie, Sir Manley Power

King's Royal Rifle Corps :- - Huntesman's Chorus, Lutzow's Wild Hunt

Wiltshire Regiment (Duke of Edinburgh's :- - The Wiltshires, The Fly be on the turmits

Manchester Regiment :- - The Manchesters

North Staffordshire Regiment (Prince of Wales's) :- - The Days We went Gypsying

York and Lancaster Regiment :- - ?

Durham Light Infantry :- - Light Barque, Old 69th, Keel Row

Highland Light Infantry (City of Glasgow Regt):- - Whistle o'er the lave o't,

- - Column: Blue Bonnets over the Border
- - Close column: Highland Laddie
- - Marching into barracks: Scotland the Brave

Seaforth Highlanders (Ross-shire Buffs, Duke of Albany's) :- - Highland Laddie

- - Band: Blue Bonnets O'er the Border
- - Pipes: Pibroch O' Donail Dhu

Gordon Highlanders:- - Cock o' the North

- - Until 1932: Highland Laddie

Queen's Own Cameron Highlanders :- - Pibroch o' Donald Dhu, March of the Cameron Men

Royal Ulster Rifles :- - Off, off, said the Stranger

Royal Irish Fusiliers :- - British Grenadiers

- - combination of Barrosa, Garry Owen, Norah Creing, St Patrick's Day

Argyll & Sutherland Highlanders (Princess Louise's):- - 1st Bn The Campbells are Coming

- - 2nd Bn: Highland Laddie

Rifle Brigade :- - I'm Ninety Five

Royal Army Service Corps :- - Wait for the Wagon

Royal Army Medical Corps :- - Bonny Nell

Royal Army Ordnance Corps :- - Village Blacksmith

Royal Army Pay Corps :- - Imperial Echoes

Royal Army Veterinary Corps :- - Village Blacksmith

Army Dental Corps :- - none

Royal Electrical & Mechanical Engineers - Lili Burlero

=== Territorial Army ===
Ayrshire (Earl of Carrick's Own) Yeomanry:- - Garb of Old Gaul

Fife and Forfar Yeomanry:- - Wee Cooper o' Fife

Lovat Scouts:- - The Lovat Scouts

Scottish Horse:- - The Scottish Horse

7th (City of London) Battalion London Regiment:- - My Lady Greensleeves

London Scottish:- - Highland Laddie

Liverpool Scottish:- - Glendauruel Highlanders

1st Surrey Rifles- - Lutzow's Wild Hunt

Tyneside Scottish:- - Highland Laddie

== Units in 2008 ==
- 1st The Queen's Dragoon Guards - Radetsky & Rusty Buckles;
- Royal Dragoon Guards - St Patrick's Day
- 6th Queen Elizabeth's Own Gurkha Rifles - Young May Moon;
- 9th/12th Royal Lancers - God Bless the Prince of Wales;
- 13th/18th Royal Hussars (Queen Mary's Own) - A Life on the Ocean Wave and Balaklava March;
- 14th/20th King's Hussars - Royal Sussex;
- 15th/19th king's Royal Hussars - The Bold King's Hussars;
- 16th/5th Queen's royal Lancers - Stable Jacket;
- 15th Princess Mary's own Gurkha Rifles - Hundred Pipers;
- 17th/21st Lancers - The White Lancers;
- 22nd (Cheshire) regiment - Wha Wadna Fecht for Charlie;
- Adjutant General's corps - Pride of Lions;
- Allied Rapid Reaction Corps - Fortune Favours the Bold;
- Argyll and Sutherland Highlanders (Princess Louise's) - The Thin Red Line;
- Army Air Corps - Recce Flight;
- Army Benevolent Fund - Action Support; SSAFA - The SSAFA Concert March;
- Army Catering corps - Sugar and Spice;
- Army Legal Corps - Scales of Justice;
- Army Physical Training Corps - Be Fit;
- Black Watch (Royal Highland Regiment) - Highland Laddie;
- Blues and Royals - Grand March from Aida & The Royals;
- Brigade of Gurkhas - Yo Nepali;
- British Korean Veterans' Association - The Hills of Korea;
- Burma Star Association - On The Road To Mandalay;
- Central flying School - Those Magnificent Men In Their Flying Machines;
- Civil Admin (MOD) - Soldiers First;
- St Dunstans - St Dunstans;
- Coldstream Guards - Milanollo;
- Corps of Royal electrical and Mechanical Engineers - Lillibullero;
- Corps of Royal Engineers - Wings;
- Corps of Royal Military Police - The Watch Tower;
- Corps of Army Music/RMSM - Blow Away the Morning Dew
- Devonshire and Dorset Regiment - Widecombe Fair, We've Lived and Loved Together and The Maid of Glenconnel;
- Duke of Edinburgh's Royal Regiment - The Farmer's Boy;
- Duke of Wellington's Regiment (West Riding) - The Wellesley;
- Duke of Edinburgh's Own Gurkha Rifles - Old Monmouthshire;
- Dunkirk Veterans Association - Dunkirk Veterans March;
- Fleet Air Arm - Flying Stations;
- Gloucestershire Regiment - The Kinnegad Slashers;
- Gordon Highlanders - Cock o' the North; 2nd
- Green Howards - Bonnie English Rose;
- Grenadier Guards - British Grenadiers;
- Gurkha Signals - Scotland the Brave;
- Special air Service - Marche Des Parachutistes Belges;
- Gurkha Transport Regiment - Wait for the Wagon;
- Gurkha Engineers - Wings;
- Gurkha Military Police - The Watch Tower;
- Highlanders - The Queen's Own Highlanders & Cock o' the North;
- Intelligence corps - The Rose and the Laurel;
- Irish Guards - St Patrick's Day;
- King Edward VII's Own Gurkha Rifles - Lutzow's Wild Hunt;
- King's Own Scottish Borderers - Blue Bonnets Over the Border;
- King's Division - Bond of Friendship;
- King's Royal Hussars - The King's Royal Hussars;
- King's Regiment - The Kingsman;
- King's Own Border Regiment - John Peel & Corn Rigs are Bonnie;
- Life Guards - Milanollo;
- Light Division - The Light Division;
- Light Infantry - Light Infantry;
- Military Provost Staff Corps - The Metropolitan;
- Normandy Veterans' Association - Normandy Veterans;
- Parachute Regiment - Ride of the Valkyries; 7th
- Prince of Wales' Division - God Bless the Prince of Wales;
- Prince of Wales's Own Regiment of Yorkshire - Ca Ira and The Yorkshire Lass;
- Princess of Wales's Royal Regiment - The Farmer's Boy/The Soldiers of the Queen;
- Queen Alexandra's Royal Army Nursing Corps - Gray and Scarlet;
- Queen Alexandra's Royal Naval Nursing Service - QARNNS March;
- Queen's Royal Irish Hussars - St Patrick's Day, Berkeley's Dragoons and The Galloping 8th Hussars;
- Queen's Regiment - Soldiers of the Queen;
- Queen's division - The Queensman;
- Queen's Royal Hussars - The Queen's Royal Hussars;
- Queen's Own Hussars - Light Cavalry;
- Queen's Royal lancers - Scarlet and Green;
- Queen's Own Highlanders - Scotland for Ever & Cameron Men;
- Queen's Lancashire Regiment - The Attack & The Red Rose;
- Reconnaissance Corps - Away To The Mountain's Brow;
- Royal Air Force - Royal Air Force March Past
- Royal Air Force Association - RAF Association March;
- Royal Air Force Nursing Service - Skywards;
- Royal Air Force Police - Royal Air Force Police March Past
- Royal Air Force Regiment - Holyrood
- Royal Anglian Regiment - Rule Britannia & Speed the Plough;
- Royal Army Chaplain's Department - Trumpet Voluntary;
- Royal Army Education Corps - Gaudeamus Igitur & The Good Comrade;
- Royal Army Medical Corps - Here's a Health unto His Majesty;
- Royal Army Ordnance Corps - The Village Blacksmith
- Royal Army Pay Corps - Imperial Echoes;
- Royal Army Veterinary Corps - Drink Puppy Drink & A Hunting We Will Go;
- Royal British Legion - The British Legion;
- Royal Corps of Signals - Swift and Sure; Begone Dull Care; The Signaller.
- Royal Corps of Transport - Wait for the Wagon;
- Royal Army Dental Corps - Green Facings;
- Royal Gloucestershire, Berkshire and Wiltshire Regiment - The Sphinx and Dragon;
- Royal GreenJackets - Huntsman's Chorus & The Italian Song;
- Royal Hampshire Regiment - The Hampshire;
- Royal Highland Fusiliers (Princess Margaret's Own Glasgow and Ayreshire Regiment) - Whistle o'er the Lave O't and British Grenadiers:
- Royal Hospital Chelsea - Boys of the Old Brigade
- Royal Hussars (Prince of Wales's Own) - The Merry Month of May;
- Royal Irish Rangers - Killaloe;
- Royal Logistic Corps - On Parade;
- Royal Marines - A Life on the Ocean Wave;
- Royal Marine Commandos - Sarie Marais;
- Royal Navy - Heart of Oak;
- Royal Naval Association - Under the White Ensign
- Royal Observer Corps - Skywatch;
- Royal Pioneer Corps - Pioneer Corps;
- Royal Regiment of Artillery - British Grenadiers & Voice of the Guns;
- Royal Regiment of Fusiliers - New Fusilier; The British Grenadiers
- Royal Regiment of Wales - Men of Harlech;
- Royal Scots - Dumbarton's Drums;
- Royal Scots Dragoon Guards - 3DG's;
- 5th Royal Inniskilling Guards - Fare ye Well Inniskilling;
- Royal Star and Garter Home - The Royal Star and Garter;
- Royal Tank Regiment - My Boy Willie;
- Royal Welch Fusiliers - The British Grenadiers;
- Scots Guards - Heilan' Laddie;
- Small Arms School Corps - March of the Bowmen;
- Staffordshire Regiment (The Prince of Wales's) - Come Lasses and Lads and The Days We went A-Gipsying;
- Strike Command - Strike Command March Past;
- Sub mariners - Up Periscope;
- Ulster Defence Regiment - Sprig of Shillelagh & Garryowen;
- Welsh Guards - Rising of the Lark;
- Women's Royal Army Corps - Lass of Richmond Hill & Early One Morning;
- Women's Royal Naval Service - Passing By;
- Women's Royal Voluntary Service - The WRVS March.
- Worcestershire and Sherwood Foresters Regiment - Young May Moon & The Royal Windsor;
