= Pastoral Symphony (Vaughan Williams) =

Symphony in four movements composed by Ralph Vaughan Williams

Vaughan Williams c. 1920

Ralph Vaughan Williams's third symphony, published as A Pastoral Symphony and not formally numbered until later, was completed in 1922. Vaughan Williams's inspiration to write this symphony came during his military service during the First World War after hearing a bugler practising: this ultimately led to the trumpet cadenza in the second movement.

The work has gained the reputation of being a subtly beautiful elegy for the dead of the World War and a meditation on the sounds of peace. Like many of the composer's works, the Pastoral Symphony is not programmatic, but its spirit is evocative. In the last of the four movements a wordless voice (usually soprano, but the score allows for a tenor alternative) joins the orchestral forces.

== Background and premiere ==
Before the outbreak of the First World War Vaughan Williams had composed two symphonies: the first, A Sea Symphony (premiered in 1910), a large-scale four-movement work for soprano, baritone, chorus and orchestra; and the second, A London Symphony (1914), a purely orchestra work.

On the outbreak of war, Vaughan Williams, despite his age – he was approaching forty-two – volunteered for military service. Joining the Royal Army Medical Corps as a private, he served as a stretcher bearer in an ambulance crew in France and later in Greece. In 1917 he was commissioned as a lieutenant in the Royal Artillery, seeing action in France from March 1918. The war left its emotional mark on Vaughan Williams, who lost many comrades and friends, including the young composer George Butterworth.

The symphony began to take shape in the composer's mind while he was stationed in France. He wrote, long afterwards, "It's really war-time music – a great deal of it incubated when I used to go up night after night with the ambulance waggon … and we went up a steep hill and there was a wonderful Corot-like landscape in the sunset – it's not really lambkins frisking at all as most people take for granted". An army bugler used to practise, and his sound "became part of that evening landscape and is the genesis of the long trumpet cadenza in the second movement of the symphony – les airs lointains d'une chanson mélancolique et tendre [the distant airs of a melancholy and tender song]".

The symphony was first performed in the Queen's Hall, London on 26 January 1922. Adrian Boult conducted the orchestra of the Royal Philharmonic Society; the soprano soloist was Flora Mann. The first American performance of the work took place on 7 June 1922. The composer conducted the orchestra of the Litchfield County Music Festival in Norfolk, Connecticut, during his first visit to the United States. The soprano soloist was Florence Hinkle.

== Structure ==
The symphony has four movements:

1. Molto moderato
2. Lento moderato
3. Moderato pesante
4. Lento

None of the four movements are particularly fast or upbeat (the composer himself described the symphony as "four movements, all of them slow"), but there are isolated extroverted sections. A typical performance of the symphony lasts about 35 minutes.

In a note for the first performance Vaughan Williams wrote, "The mood of this Symphony is, as its title suggests, almost entirely quiet and contemplative – there are few fortissimos and few allegros. The only really quick passage is the coda to the third movement, and that is all pianissimo. In form it follows fairly closely the classical pattern, and is in four movements."

=== I. Molto moderato ===
The time signature shifts throughout the movement between 4/4 and 3/4.

=== II. Lento moderato ===
Moderato maestoso – the slow movement opens with an F major natural-horn solo above an F minor chord, a theme that is developed by a solo cello.
The time signature shifts between 3/4 and 4/4 (with a few bars in 2/4).

Just as in the first movement, the ideas flow gently from one to the next, ultimately leading to the trumpet cadenza. Here, the instrument is in effect a natural trumpet (a trumpet without valves) in E♭, since the player is instructed not to use the valves. As a result, the seventh harmonic is played instead of the ordinary minor seventh, and so it sounds slightly out-of-tune with its nearest equivalent in 12-tone equal temperament.

The entire cadenza is played over a pedal note in the strings. The cadenza material later reappears on the natural horn in F, gently accompanied by a returning theme now played on the cor anglais. The movement ends with a quiet chord in the violins' high register.

=== III. Moderato pesante ===
Vaughan Williams described this movement, the symphony's scherzo, as a "slow dance". The time signature shifts between 3/4, 4/4 and 5/4.

The trio, introduced by the brass section, with a theme of folk contour, stated by the trumpet, offering a contrast.

After the shortened return of the main material there is a coda with some fugal writing. This is the only time truly fast music appears in the symphony. A theme from the main section of the movement creeps into this fugue. The movement ends in a major chord.

=== IV. Lento ===
The final movement is mostly in 3/4, with a few bars in 2/4 and 4/4. It returns to the contemplative manner of the first two movements, and functions as a summing-up and coda to the rest of the symphony. It begins with a pentatonic passage for a wordless voice (silent until this point), sung over a soft drumroll. In the published score Vaughan Williams specifies a soprano or tenor voice for the vocal line, but provides a solo version for the first clarinet to be used for performances where there is no singer. (Note: All but one of the eighteen recordings in the table above feature a soprano. The 2016 recording by Manze and the Liverpool players features a tenor.) The theme is marked "senza misura"– without bar-lines – which Grove's Dictionary of Music and Musicians defines as "freely", "without strict regard for the metre". (Note: Vaughan Williams had already used the direction senza misura in his 1914 work The Lark Ascending, for the violin cadenza immediately after the opening bars.)

The orchestra then begins an elegiac rhapsody. The solo reappears, now accompanied only by sustained notes from the muted violins. Voice, clarinets and violins bring the symphony to a ppp end.

== Instrumentation ==
The symphony is scored for a large orchestra including: 3 flutes (3rd doubling on piccolo), 2 oboes, cor anglais, 3 clarinets (in B♭ and A; 3rd doubling on bass clarinet), 2 bassoons, 4 horns (in F), 3 trumpets (in C, 1 doubling on natural trumpet in E♭), 3 trombones, tuba, timpani, triangle, cymbals, bass drum, celesta, harp, and strings, plus a wordless solo voice in the 4th movement.

== Reception ==
From its first performance the symphony caused widely divergent reactions. H. C. Colles, music critic of The Times, found it a great advance on its predecessors: "There is nothing in the Pastoral Symphony but music. He is not concerned to find 'a way of speaking about life' which shall satisfy anyone else even for a moment. ... He is just living his own life simply, unaffectedly". Bruce Richmond said the work made him fall in love with music all over again.

Peter Warlock's often-quoted comment that "it is all just a little too much like a cow looking over a gate" was in fact a comment on Vaughan Williams's style in general, and was not aimed specifically at the Pastoral Symphony, which he described as "a truly splendid work" and "the best English orchestral music of this century". Constant Lambert wrote that that in this work, "the creation of a particular type of grey, reflective, English-landscape mood has outweighed the exigencies of symphonic form", but he ranked the work as "one of the landmarks in modern music". Hugh Allen said (affectionately, according to Kennedy) that it "suggested V.W. rolling over and over in a ploughed field on a wet day". Other composers valued the symphony highly, among them Herbert Howells, Cecil Sharp and Gustav Holst, who preferred it to any of Vaughan Williams's other orchestral works: "the very essence of you. Which is one of the two reasons (the other being that it is a beautiful work of art) why it is such an important event in my life".

In a chapter of Robert Simpson's symposium on symphonies, David Cox writes of the Pastoral that it was quite unlike any other symphony that had ever appeared before:

Despite the general lack of outward movement, there is any amount of contrast, variety, and spiritual excitement throughout the work. Chordal 'blocks' shift against each other regardless of dissonance. there are suggestive contrapuntal movements below the surface, and contrasted textures – such as the combination of triple and duple rhythms.

Cox adds that the work "is the expression of moods, not scene-painting" and that there are no babbling brooks or rustles of spring. In his analysis the still, remote music represented "an impersonal union with nature, which finds perfect lyrical expression in the wordless vocal solo of the last movement"

In 2020 the composer and musical analyist Robert Matthew-Walker wrote, "The Pastoral is the least-often played of Vaughan Williams's earlier symphonies, yet it remains, after a century, one of his strongest, most powerful and most personal utterances, fully bearing out Lambert’s earlier estimation.

== Recordings ==
Conductor	Orchestra	Soloist	Year	Ref
Sir Adrian Boult	London Philharmonic	Margaret Ritchie	1953	
Sir Adrian Boult	BBC Symphony	Valerie Hill	1966	
Sir Adrian Boult	New Philharmonia	Margaret Price	1968	
André Previn	London Symphony	Heather Harper	1971	
Bryden Thomson	London Symphony	Yvonne Kenny	1987	
Gennady Rozhdestvensky	USSR Ministry of Culture Symphony	Yelena Dof-Donskaya	1988	
Vernon Handley	Royal Liverpool Philharmonic	Alison Barlow	1991	
Leonard Slatkin	Philharmonia	Linda Hohenfeld	1991	
Kees Bakels	Bournemouth Symphony	Patricia Rozario	1992	
Andrew Davis	BBC Symphony	Patricia Rozario	1996	
Bernard Haitink	London Philharmonic	Amanda Roocroft	1996	
Roger Norrington	London Philharmonic	Rosa Mannion	1997	
Richard Hickox	London Symphony	Rebecca Evans	2002	
Sir Mark Elder	Hallé	Sarah Fox	2013	
Andrew Manze	Royal Liverpool Philharmonic	Andrew Staples	2016	
Martyn Brabbins	BBC Symphony	Elizabeth Watts	2020	

== Notes, references and sources ==
=== Sources ===
- Cox, David (1967). "Ralph Vaughan Williams". In Simpson, Robert (ed.). The Symphony: Elgar to the Present Day. Harmondsworth: Pelican Books. OCLC 221594461.
- Frogley, Alain (2013). "History and geography: the early orchestral works and first three symphonies". In Alain Frogley and Aidan Thomson (ed.). The Cambridge Companion to Vaughan Williams. Cambridge: Cambridge University Press. ISBN 978-0-521-19768-7.
- Howells, Herbert (April 1922). "Vaughan Williams's 'Pastoral' Symphony". Music & Letters. 3 (2).
- Kennedy, Michael (1980). The Works of Ralph Vaughan Williams (second ed.). Oxford: Oxford University Press. ISBN 978-0-19-315453-7.
- Lambert, Constant (1967). Music Ho! (second ed.). New York: October House. OCLC 716426501.
- Smith, Barry (1994). Peter Warlock: The Life of Philip Heseltine. Oxford: Clarendon Press. ISBN 978-0-19-816310-7.
- Vaughan Williams, Ralph (1924). Pastoral Symphony. London: Boosey and Hawkes. OCLC 909283807.
- Vaughan Williams, Ralph (1925). The Lark Ascending. London: Oxford University Press. OCLC 939605857.
- Vaughan Williams, Ursula (1965) [1964]. RVW: A Biography of Ralph Vaughan Williams. Oxford: Oxford University Press. ISBN 978-0-19-315411-7.
