= Jeremy Savile =

Jeremy or Jeremiah Savile (fl. 1650) was an English musician in London under the Commonwealth. He taught the voice and viol, and composed songs.

== Life ==
Savile was named by John Playford as among the leading London teachers "for the voyce or viol" during the period. Playford and Savile were members of a catch club in Old Jewry. Lynan in the Oxford Dictionary of National Biography notes that Playford's The Musical Companion of 1667 does not mention Savile, and suggests that he may have died in the Great Plague of London of 1665–6.

== Works ==
Savile was the composer of a short part-song called "The Waits", using only of the syllables "fa la la", much used in 19th-century madrigal societies' programmes. The piece was published in Playford's The Musical Companion (1667). Words were set to it by Thomas Oliphant. Sir Henry Rowley Bishop used it in "Twelfth Night" produced at Covent Garden in 1820, and reset it for five voices.

Other pieces by Savile were printed in The Musical Companion; one of these, the song Here's a Health unto His Majesty, has lasted. Three solo songs by him were in Playford's Select Musicall Ayres and Dialogues of 1653.
