= Cock o' the North (music) =

Traditional Scottish bagpipe tune

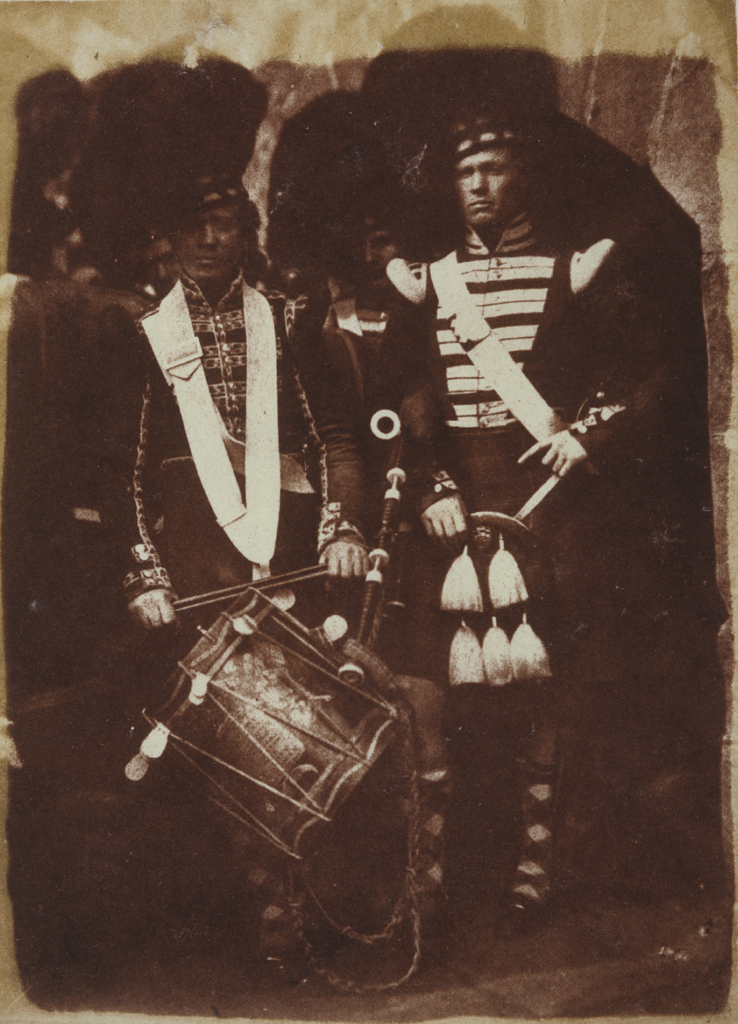
A piper and drummer of the 92nd Gordon Highlanders, at Edinburgh Castle in 1846.

Cock o'the North is a 6/8 military march, bagpipe tune and jig. The title comes from the nickname of Alexander Gordon, 4th Duke of Gordon, who in 1794 raised the 92nd Regiment of Foot, which later became the Gordon Highlanders.

== History ==
The composer is unknown, but it first appeared in print in 1816 as a violin tune. It was later published in a collection of bagpipe music by Donald MacDonald in 1822, with the title of Gairm n’an Coileach (Scottish Gaelic: "The Cock’s Crow"). Some writers have noted a similarity to the 17th century English tune "Joan's Placket is Torn", which was mentioned by Samuel Pepys and is in John Playford's work, The Dancing Master. A version of the tune as a reel, from the island of Whalsay goes by the name Jumping John.

== Military use ==
The tune has always been a march used by the Gordon Highlanders, although it did not become the official regimental march until 1933, when it replaced Hielan' Laddie. Although strongly associated with the Gordons, it was used by other Highland regiments, too.

At the Siege of Lucknow, during the Indian Mutiny of 1857, 12-year-old Drummer Ross of the 93rd Highlanders signalled the arrival of his regiment to the besieged garrison, by climbing the spire of the Shah Najaf Mosque and playing "Cock o' the North" on his bugle, while under heavy fire from the rebel forces.

In 1897, during an attack by the Gordon Highlanders on the Dargai Heights, which were held by Afridi tribesmen during the Tirah campaign, Piper George Findlater won the Victoria Cross for continuing to play a regimental march while wounded in both feet. The official statement did not give the name of the tune he played; some accounts state that it was "Haughs of Cromdale" which was the Regimental Charge-tune, others claim it was "Cock of the North". Findlater's own account says that he did not hear an order to play "Cock of the North", and played "Cromdale" on his own initiative.

Besides the Gordons, the tune is, or has been, an official march for the following units:

- 48th Highlanders of Canada
- 85th Nova Scotia Highlanders
- King's Own Scottish Borderers
- Royal Canadian Regiment.
- 41st Battalion, Royal New South Wales Regiment
- 7th Battalion, Royal Australian Regiment
- 5th/6th Battalion, Royal Victoria Regiment
- Cape Town Highlanders
- 32 Service Battalion

== Aunty Mary ==
A well known drinking or bawdy song using the Cock of the North tune is known as Aunty Mary. There are a great number of versions of varying degrees of obscenity. They nearly all share the same first two lines. One of the milder versions runs:

Auntie Mary had a canary
Up the leg of her drawers;
She was sleeping, it was creeping,
Up the leg of her drawers.

The song features in the surrealist BBC film The End of Arthur's Marriage. Note that the word cross has the same vowel as drawers in Cockney pronunciation.

Auntie Mary had a canary
Up the leg of her drawers;
It whistled for hours among the flowers
And won the Victoria Cross
Aunty Judy's budgy went broody
August Bank Holiday
It laid her an egg the size of her head
And frightened the cockerells away
