= The Garb of Old Gaul =

18th-century Scottish march and song

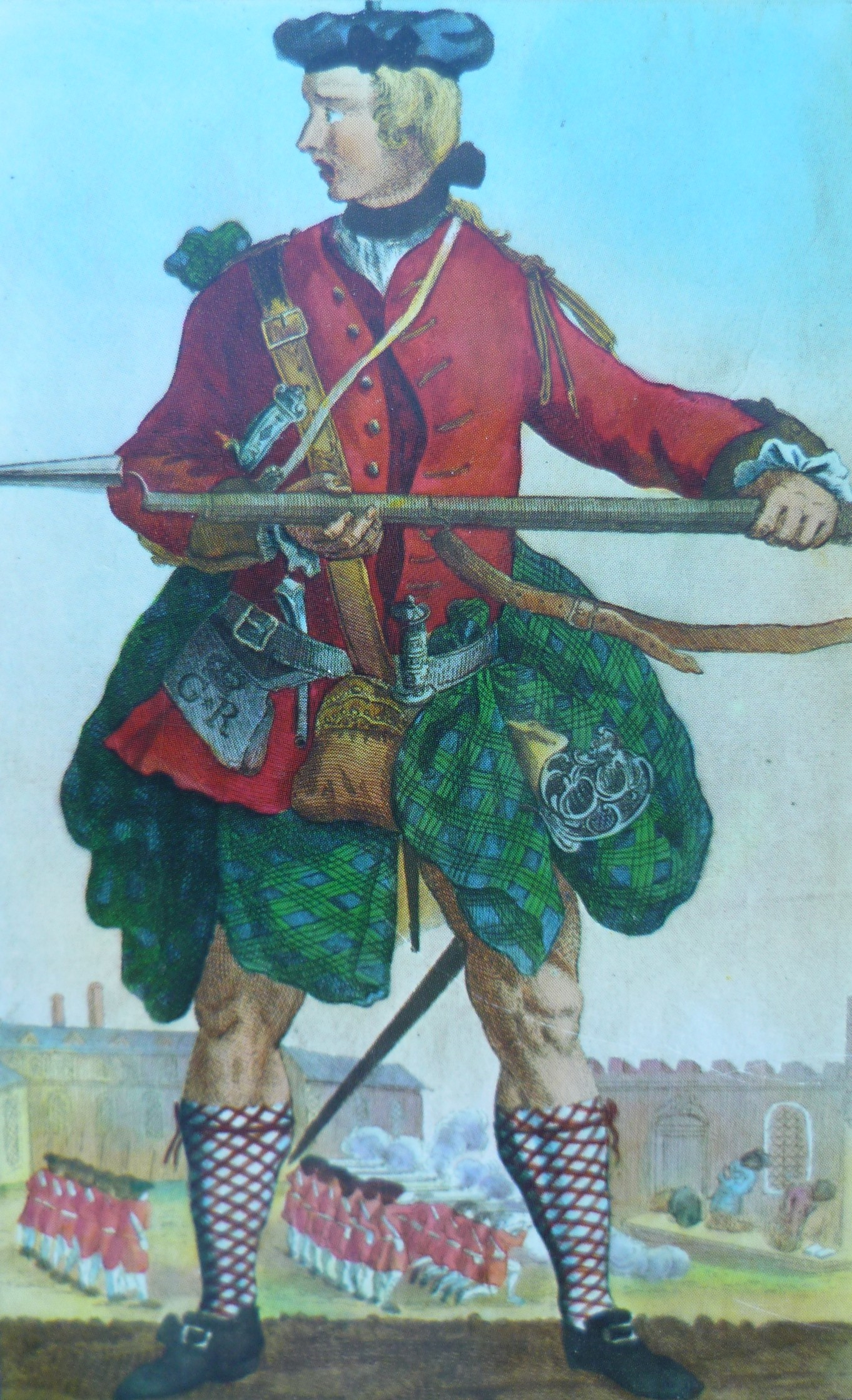
Soldier Samuel McPherson of the Black Watch at the time of the mutiny of 1743

The Garb of Old Gaul (sometimes given as "Auld Gaul") is an 18th-century patriotic Scottish march and song about Highland soldiers during the Seven Years' War.

== Origins ==
The music was written by General John Reid, who was a senior officer of the 42nd Regiment of Foot (The Black Watch) during the Seven Years' War. The words have traditionally been attributed to Sir Harry Erskine (1710 -1765). Robert Burns described it as "This excellent loyal Scottish song" and states that it first appeared in print in Herd's Collection of 1769. Alternative titles include The Highland Character and The Highland or 42nd Regiment's March. The tune was originally a quick march but was later rearranged as a slow march.

== Lyrics ==
The lyrics of the song are about the martial prowess of Highland soldiers and the perceived British tradition of freedom and fighting against the despotic French. The phrase "Garb of Old Gaul" refers to the traditional Highland dress, ancient Gaul being thought of at the time as the heartland of the Celtic peoples.

The first stanza runs:

In the garb of old Gaul with the fire of old Rome,
From the heath-covered mountains of Scotia we come;
When the Romans endeavoured our country to gain,
Our ancestors fought, and they fought not in vain.

== Military use ==
The tune is used by a number of Scottish military units as their regimental march. These include:

- Royal Scots Dragoon Guards
- Queen's Royal Hussars
- Scots Guards
- Royal Scots (now the 1st Battalion, The Royal Regiment of Scotland)
- Black Watch (now the 3rd Battalion, The Royal Regiment of Scotland)
- Queen's Own Highlanders (Seaforth and Camerons)(now 4th Battalion Royal Regiment of Scotland)
- Ayrshire (Earl of Carrick's Own) Yeomanry (now "A" Squadron, Scottish and North Irish Yeomanry)
- West Nova Scotia Regiment (Canadian Forces)
- Royal Newfoundland Regiment (Canadian Forces)

The Garb of Old Gaul is used as part of the salute when the Lord Mayor of London boards a Royal Navy ship within the riparian limits of the City of London.

It was also the former slow march of Princess Patricia's Canadian Light Infantry, until being replaced by "Lili Marlene".
