= The Farmer's Boy =

English folk song

- English folk song
- Text: attributed to Charles Whitehead
- Melody: "Ye Sons of Albion" (anonymous early 19th century)
- Published: 1832

"The Farmer's Boy" is a traditional English folk song or ballad, listed as number 408 in the Roud Folk Song Index. It has been arranged as a military march.

== History ==
=== Origins ===
The earliest written record of the song is under the name "The Lucky Farmer's Boy" in an 1832 catalogue of street ballads printed in London by James Catnach. In 1857, the compiler of a book of "Songs of the Peasantry of England" wrote; "There is no question that the Farmer's Boy is a very ancient song; it is highly popular amongst the north country lads and lasses. The date of the composition may probably be referred to the commencement of the last century... The song is popular all over the country, and there are numerous printed copies, ancient and modern." Frank Kidson the English musicologist and folk song collector wrote in 1891, "Even now, the popularity of 'The Farmer's Boy' is great among country singers". Although he said that there was little variation in the text, he included three melodies and a fourth in an appendix, none of which is the most widely known one today.

The Baptist Church at Little Leigh where Thomas Fownes Smith preached. He is said to have been the original "Farmer's Boy"

A legend in Little Leigh, Cheshire, suggests that the song is based on the life of the Reverend Thomas Fownes Smith (1802–1866) and was written by his brother-in-law, Charles Whitehead (born 1792). Smith was the minister at Little Leigh Baptist Chapel for more than 30 years, where a plaque in his memory is located on the inside rear wall. It is one of three folk songs traditionally sung by participants ahead of the Haxey Hood, a traditional mob football game held annually in North Lincolnshire at Epiphany.

=== Tune ===
The tune most commonly associated with "The Farmer's Boy" comes from "Ye Sons of Albion", a patriotic song from the Napoleonic Wars. That particular tune and song were first noted in 1909 in Oxfordshire by Janet Blunt of Adderbury Manor. It is this melody that has been arranged as a regimental march for the Royal Canadian Medical Service, a number of Commonwealth regiments including the Princess of Wales's Royal Regiment and the Duke of Edinburgh's Royal Regiment. Although not the official marching tune of the Suffolk Regiment, it was played and sung by the band and men of the regiment's 4th Battalion on the march in France during the First World War.

=== Field recordings ===
In 1908, the composer and folk song collector Percy Grainger made a phonograph recording of a M. Tandy of Winchcombe, Gloucestershire, singing a fragment of the song, which can be heard on the British Library Sound Archive website. Mark Anderson of Middleton-in-Teasdale, County Durham, the original source of the famous Scarborough Fair melody, sang the song to Alan Lomax in 1951, the recording of which is available online via the Alan Lomax archive. Peter Kennedy (1953) and Alan Lomax (1954) recorded Jags Plough of Barrow-on-Humber, Lincolnshire, singing the song. Folk song collector Ken Stubbs recorded several versions in the 1960s and 70s in Sussex, Surrey and Cornwall, including one by the Sussex singer Pop Maynard, all of which can be heard on the Vaughan Williams Memorial Library website. The traditional singers Walter Pardon of Knapton, Norfolk (1985) and Fred Jordan of Ludlow, Shropshire (1990/91) were recorded singing versions of the song.

Figures such as John Lomax, Alan Lomax, Mary Elizabeth Barnicle, Helen Hartness Flanders, Helen Creighton, Edith Fowke collected and recorded versions all across the United States and Canada around the middle of the twentieth century.

== Lyrics ==
The sun had set behind yon hills,
Across yon dreary moor,
Weary and lame, a boy there came
Up to a farmer's door
'Can you tell me if any there be
That will give me employ,
To plough and sow, and reap and mow,
And be a farmer's boy?

'My father is dead, and mother is left
With five children, great and small;
And what is worse for mother still,
I'm the oldest of them all.
Though little, I'll work as hard as a Turk,
If you'll give me employ,
To plough and sow, and reap and mow,
And be a farmer's boy.

'And if that you won't me employ,
One favour I've to ask, –
Will you shelter me, till break of day,
From this cold winter's blast?
At break of day, I'll trudge away
Elsewhere to seek employ,
To plough and sow, and reap and mow,
And be a farmer's boy.'

'Come, try the lad,' the mistress said,
'Let him no further seek.'
'O, do, dear father!' the daughter cried,
While tears ran down her cheek
'He'd work if he could, so 'tis hard to want food,
And wander for employ;
Don't turn him away, but let him stay,
And be a farmer's boy.'

And when the lad became a man,
The good old farmer died,
And left the lad the farm he had,
And his daughter for his bride.
The lad that was, the farm now has,
Oft smiles, and thinks with joy
Of the lucky day he came that way,
To be a farmer's boy.
