= Teresa and Maria Milanollo =

Italian violinists

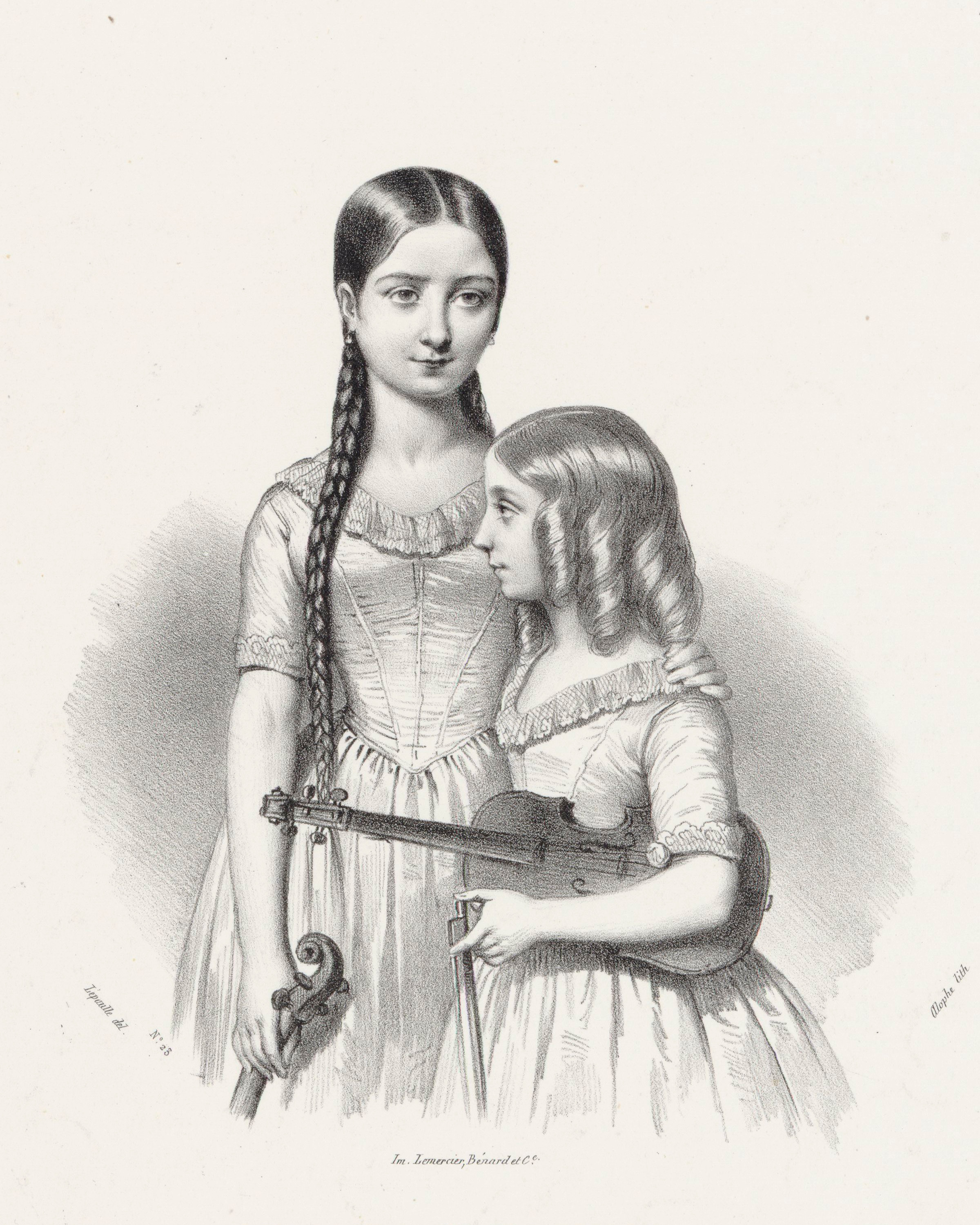
Teresa and Maria Milanollo, the 19th-century Italian child prodigies whose violin-playing took Europe by storm and inspired the name of the Coldstream Guards regimental march and a theatre in their native Savigliano

Teresa Milanollo (full name Domenica Maria Teresa; 1827–1904) and her younger sister, Maria Milanollo (1832–1848), were Italian violin-playing child prodigies who toured Europe extensively to great acclaim in the 1840s. After Maria died at age 16, Teresa, who was also a composer, had a long solo career. The name "Milanollo" has been perpetuated by the regimental march of the Life Guards, Coldstream Guards and Governor General's Foot Guards, written in their honour by their contemporary J.V. Hamm. The Teatro Milanollo in their native Savigliano was named for the sisters.

Taught violin in infancy by Ferrero, Caldera, and Morra, Teresa made her concert debut in her native Savigliano aged nine. In 1836 she moved to Paris with her family. She toured Britain, France, the Netherlands and Belgium, sometimes with her virtuoso tutors, Lafont, subsequently Habeneck and later still, de Bériot. She eventually became her sister Maria's first and only violin coach.

From 1838 to 1848, the Milanollo sisters toured throughout France, the Netherlands, Belgium, Germany, the Austro-Hungarian Empire, and England, charming royal courts and such composers as Johann Strauss the Elder, Berlioz, Liszt, Chopin and Meyerbeer. Their nicknames, "Mademoiselle Staccato" (Maria) and "Mademoiselle Adagio" (Teresa) reflected their contrasting personalities; the more solemn Teresa was acknowledged as the genius of the two. After Maria Milanollo's untimely death in 1848, Teresa continued performing solo, establishing a system of "Concerts aux Pauvres" (charitable concerts). She retired in 1857 on marriage and died in Paris in 1904.

Although Teresa Milanollo was a pioneer among women violinists, her own musical compositions are now largely forgotten. Three of her violins survive today, a 1728 Stradivarius (the "Milanollo-Dragonetti") played by Paganini and bequeathed to Teresa by Domenico Dragonetti, a c. 1680 Ruggieri small violin (the "Milanollo") the property of her younger sister Maria, auctionied by Tarisio in April 2010, and a 1703 Stradivarius (the "Milanollo-Hembert").

== Biography of the Milanollo sisters ==
The Milanollo sisters, were a pair of violin-playing prodigies who toured Europe to great acclaim during the 1840s.

=== Early years ===
==== Birth, parentage, and their father's profession ====
They were among thirteen children born in Savigliano in Piedmont, to Giuseppe Antonio Milanollo and his wife Antonina (née Rizzo) of Mondovì,. Born on 18 August 1827. Teresa was almost five years older than Maria (born 18 June 1832). Although Giuseppe Milanollo's profession is usually given as a "manufacturer of silk-spinning machines", he was identified by a contemporary musical critic as a "luthier", i.e., a maker of stringed instruments.

==== Teresa Milanollo's training in Turin and first concerts ====
The profession of luthier is consistent with Giuseppe's making for Teresa a little violin of white wood and giving her basic harmony lessons. This was in response to her persistent demands for a violin of her own after first displaying musical interest at the age of four. On leaving a church after a funeral ceremony in honour of King Charles Felix of Sardinia, Giuseppe had asked her if she had prayed. "No, father," she replied, "I did nothing but listen to the violin."

Giuseppe placed Teresa under the tuition of Giovanni Ferrero, based locally in Savigliano. Aged eight, Teresa was taken to Turin to study with Giovanni Morra and Mauro Caldera. Shortly following her concert debut in the oratory of a convent of Savigliano, she performed in Mondovì on 17 April 1836 and then other cities in Piedmont to great admiration. To support Teresa's blossoming career, the Milanollo family departed later in 1836 for France, travelling on foot and by mule, to play in the Musard concerts in Marseille.

"There is little doubt," wrote Henry Lahee, "that the success of Teresa Milanollo gave the first great impulse toward the study of the violin by women."

==== 1836–37: Marseille, Paris and touring the Netherlands with Lafont ====
After a stop in Nice, Teresa concertised for a few evenings in the Rue de Noailles in Marseille, then on to the Grand-Théâtre. From there, the Milanollo family travelled on to Paris with a letter of introduction to the celebrated violinist Charles Philippe Lafont, who now became her teacher. In Paris she performed some concerts at the Opéra Comique.

At the end of 1836, she went with Lafont for a tour of Belgium and the Netherlands. They performed together in a benefit concert on 10 December in the Hôtel de Ville, Brussels. From 18 to 30 January 1837, Teresa starred in five concerts in Amsterdam, from where she was summoned to entertain at the royal court in The Hague. During March and April she played concerts in, among others, Utrecht, Delft, Rotterdam and Amsterdam again.

==== 1837–38: London — study with Mori, a mismanaged UK tour, and concerts for Strauss the Elder ====
Following the Netherlands tour, nine-year-old Teresa moved in 1837 with her family to London, where her brother Augustus was born. There she took lessons with Nicolas Mori and Auguste Tolbecque. Mori duetted with her on a sinfonia concertante in a series of concerts which she gave from 30 May onwards at Covent Garden Theatre.

On 30 June 1837, Teresa appeared at the King's Theatre in the Haymarket alongside her young colleague and contemporary, the German A. Moeser. (The King's Theatre, the second on this site, eventually became Her Majesty's Theatre, where Phantom of the Opera has enjoyed a long run in London.)

A French harpist, Nicolas-Charles Bochsa, at the time taking refuge in London to avoid prosecution for fraud and forgery, volunteered his services as manager to Teresa. Unfortunately, he pocketed the earnings due to Teresa and her family from the September–October UK tour of forty concerts he organized, which took in Liverpool and many venues in the South West and Wales.

On Wednesday, 11 April 1838, Teresa Milanollo entertained the 22nd Anniversary of the Theatrical Fund of the Covent Garden Theatre. The glittering dinner, which raised £1,000, was also the occasion to announce, "to loud and general cheering", that Queen Victoria, recently crowned, had agreed to be Patroness of the Fund. It took place at the Freemasons' Tavern on Queen Street. The theatrical chronicler Simon Henry Gage described a "large room completely filled and the gallery exhibited a bright phalanx of beauty", and hailed the performance of "that wonderful girl, Milanollo".

Teresa 's father succeeded in bringing her to the attention of Johann Strauss the Elder, in whose concerts she performed from May 1838 onwards. She played in London's prestigious Hanover Square Rooms with young pianist Ellen May on 9 June.

==== 1838–1840: Return to France, first performances and tours with Maria, and study with Habeneck ====
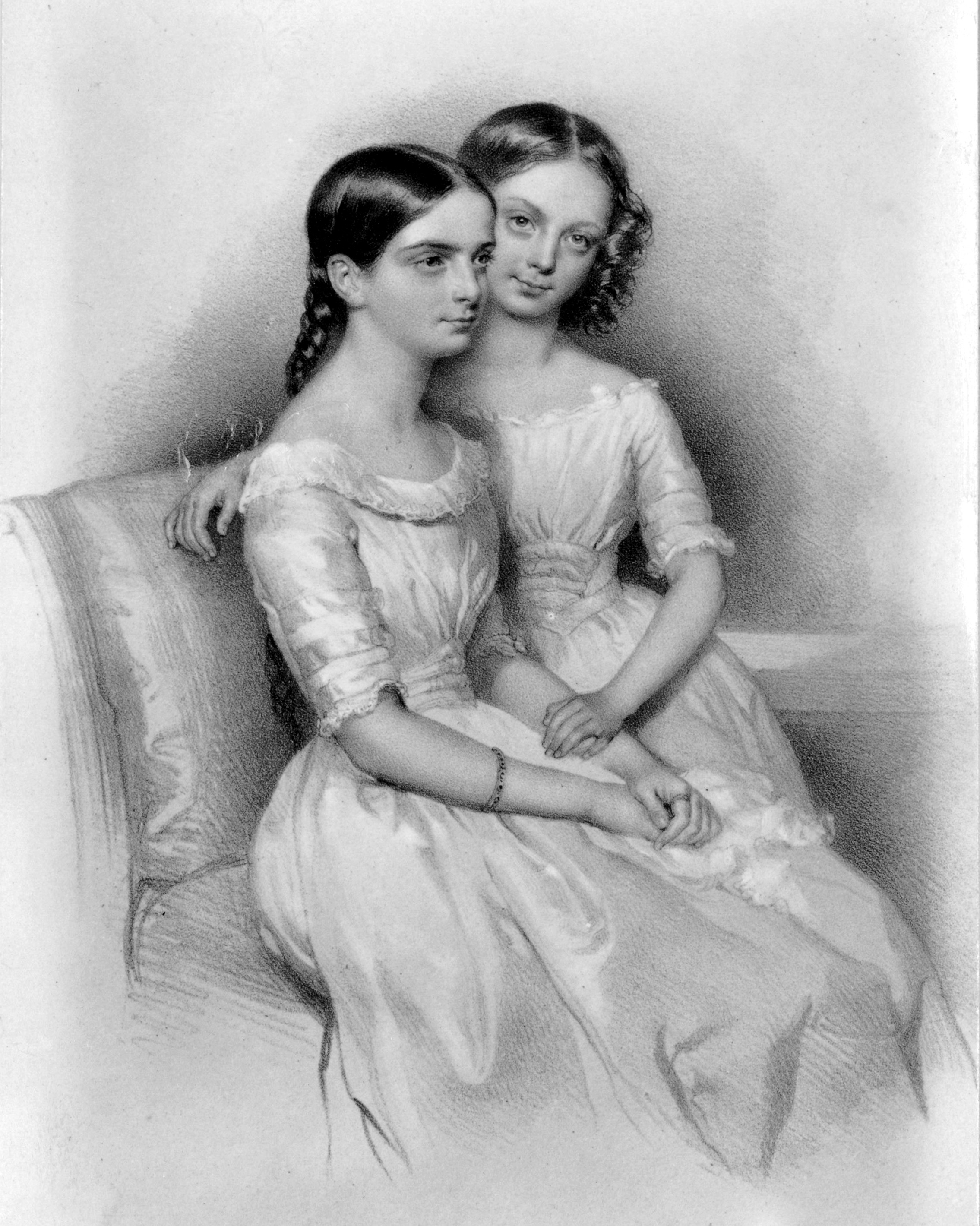
Teresa and Maria Milanollo toured Europe as a duo from 1838 to 1848. Teresa was Maria's first and only violin teacher.

After the eleven-year-old Teresa returned to France in mid-1838 she began teaching violin to her little sister Maria, then aged six. By 19 June 1838, they performed their first official performance together. The unprecedented appearance of two female violinists "constituted a new feature of the concert-room" and "created a sensation" which led to the sisters' eventual "worldwide fame".

Now Teresa embarked on a triumphant tour of Northern France, including Lille (November), Rouen (in a concert with Amédée Méreaux) and Normandy, lasting until the beginning of 1839. She played a further seven concerts in Rouen in April.

From early 1840 Teresa, increasingly accompanied by Maria, performed in other places in France. There were six concerts in April in Nantes, where, at that time, the first biography of the two gifted sisters was printed. They were now aged thirteen and eight. Writing in 1897, Alice Diehl identifies Teresa as the inspirational pioneer among female violinists:

Although the popularity of the violin as a playing instrument among amateurs, notably of the gentler sex, seems at first sign to be of very recent date ... the movement was initiated long ago, ... when the gifted prodigy, Teresa Milanollo, was a sensation of the hour in the [eighteen-]forties. Maria Milanollo, her younger sister, played duets in public with her. But although Maria was a gifted player, Teresa was a genius. She played in all styles with insight and fervour, and those who frequently heard her declare her technique to have been equal to that of the greatest men players of the day.

The success of the Milanollos induced other gifted young girls to emulate them.

Their father Giuseppe, always soliciting optimal learning and artistic opportunities for the girls, placed Teresa during summer 1840 under the tutelage of François-Antoine Habeneck, the Director of the Société des Concerts du Conservatoire (the main orchestra in Bordeaux), and first violin in the orchestra and conductor of the Opera. Between October and December 1840, the young sisters performed with great success in 12 concerts in Bordeaux, and a further eight concerts in Orléans in February, 1841.

=== 1841–1845: Success and glittering tours ===
During these years, aged fourteen and nine in 1841, the Milanollo sisters performed not only for the crowned heads of Europe, but also for – and sometimes with – the composers Berlioz, Chopin, Liszt, and Meyerbeer.

==== Bordeaux Conservatory concert, 18 April 1841 — the making of Teresa's reputation ====
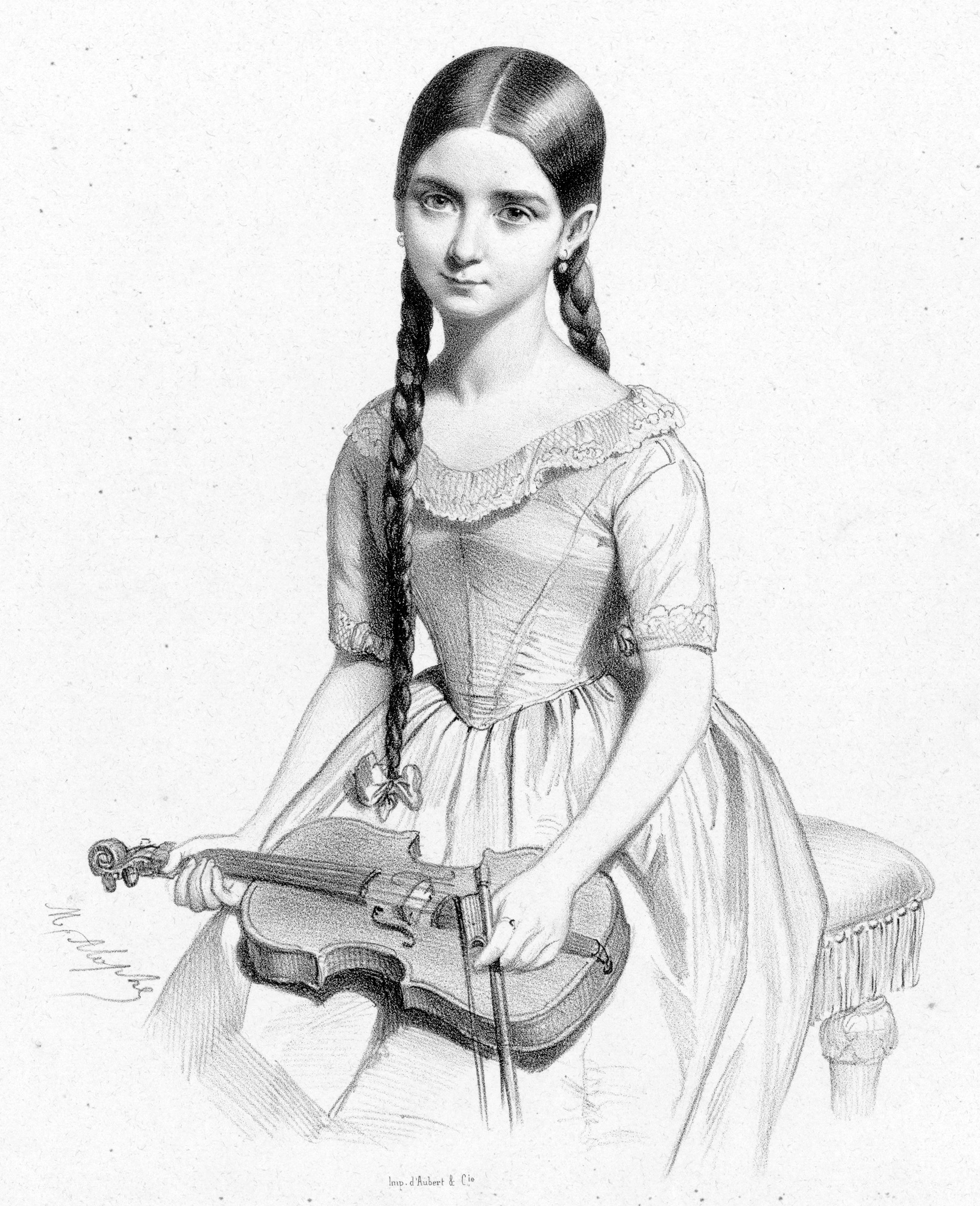
Teresa Milanollo in 1841

On 5 April, the two sisters appeared together in the recently built Salle des Concerts Herz. That concert was approached with a mixture of "scorn and boredom" by the critic Henri Blanchard, who pronounced it a "splendidly happy" occasion afterwards.

However, it was the Bordeaux Conservatory concert of 18 April 1841, attended by the composer Berlioz, which sealed the 14-year-old Teresa's reputation, and proved to be a turning point in her career. "In the opinion of all the critics of that time, and notably of Berlioz, her success was immense, and it was this appearance that definitely crowned her reputation." Apparently, Habeneck "made her play his Grand Polonaise in C".

Shortly afterwards, Berlioz himself reviewed the concert in La Revue et Gazette Musicale de Paris (25 April 1841). He attributed the enormous success of the performance not to Teresa's precociousness but to her exquisite musical qualities, such as tonal precision and cleanliness, rhythmic liveliness and regularity, and felicitous placement of the most difficult high notes. Her interpretative skills were also praised.

On 15 May Teresa performed in the presence of Frédéric Chopin, George Sand and Friedrich Kalkbrenner.

Following these acclaimed performances King Louis Philippe III invited the sisters to play for the royal family in his castle at Neuilly (3 June).

The sisters were by now inseparable. The younger sister, Maria, had been studying with Teresa since 1838, who was her first and only teacher.

==== 1841–42: Tuition with de Bériot; touring Northern France and Belgium ====
Embarking with Maria on another long tour of northern France, in Boulogne Teresa met de Bériot, who took her on as a student in Brussels. De Bériot taught her "the masterly bowing of the school of Viotti and Pierre Baillot" and faultless intonation. (Many years later, under her married name of Parmentier, Teresa credited de Bériot with having “completed her artistic education".)

The Milanollo sisters played throughout Belgium in Antwerp, Liege and Brussels until April 1842, then again in Northern France in the summer. At that time, Teresa performed frequently with the young Belgian pianist Édouard Gregoir.

==== 1842–43: Germany, Austria-Hungary, and back to their native Piedmont ====
That September, they began a long tour of Germany in Aachen. A month later, in Cologne, in the palace of Brühl the sisters had the honour of performing together with Franz Liszt before King Frederick William IV of Prussia and William II of the Netherlands. While in Frankfurt, during December, where they performed 13 concerts, another younger brother Joseph, was born; the Milanollo sisters then toured to Düsseldorf, and other cities including Stuttgart and Karlsruhe throughout the spring of 1843

On 24 April the Milanollo sisters gave their first concert in the Saal der Gesellschaft für Musikfreunde in Vienna, and followed it with 24 more. They "took Vienna by storm" under the patronage of Empress Maria Anna of Savoy, receiving audience sponsorship of more than 50,000 guilders. The nicknames given them by the public reflect their contrasting personalities: Teresa, more sombre and serious, was dubbed "Mademoiselle Adagio", and Maria, more cheery and outgoing, "Mademoiselle Staccato". Otto Nicolai, the celebrated composer and orchestra conductor, compared them to "angels of the violin".

After performances in many cities in the Austro-Hungarian Empire, the tour reached Trieste in August, and then regained their native Piedmont, from which they had been absent for six years. They played a benefit concert in Turin, but also in Savigliano and other places, and finally performed at the royal castle of Govone, in the presence of Queen Maria Theresa of Habsburg and Tuscany. Between 6–30 November the sisters completed 8 concerts in La Scala, Milan, and in December 1843 performed in Venice after concerts in Verona and Padua. They also played a concert in Trieste in December, on their way back to the Austro-Hungarian Empire.

==== 1844–45: In Austria-Hungary, to Belgium and the Netherlands, and Britain again ====
From January 1844, the two violinists performed in Prague, Leipzig and Dresden. In Berlin, they gave twelve concerts in March and April and played at the king's court, accompanied by Giacomo Meyerbeer. They then held many concerts in several other German cities, ten of them in Hamburg alone.

A return to Brussels gave Teresa the opportunity to study with HF Kufferath. Winter 1844 was spent concertising throughout Belgium, and New Year 1845 saw 17 performances in Amsterdam. Then, after briefly touring Northern France, the Milanollos performed in Britain in summer 1845, including in the presence of Queen Victoria.

=== Last tours, settling in Malzéville and Maria's death ===
From early 1845 until 1847, the young sisters continued touring, visiting Rhine provinces, Bavaria, and principal cities in Switzerland and in Central France. They reached Nancy in July 1847 and settled there, buying a property in Malzéville. In December 1847 they were again invited to Lyon, where they played ten concerts. The February revolution of 1848 broke out, scuppering the Milanollos sisters' engagement for 15 concerts at the Opéra. They took refuge at Malzéville, but after a few months Maria became ill and died in Paris on 21 October 1848 of consumption. She was sixteen years old.

==== Maria Milanollo ====
Maria Milanollo was born in Savigliano, close to Turin, on 19 July 1832. Until her untimely death in Paris (21 October 1848), she played in concerts with her sister Teresa, who was almost five years her senior (born in Savigliano 29 August 1827). They enjoyed brilliant success in concerts in France, Germany, the Netherlands, and England.

From the beginning Teresa was Maria's violin teacher, but, says Piero Faustini, Maria must certainly have derived benefit from the teaching of Teresa's many virtuoso instructors. Her official debut was on her sixth birthday in Paris in a concert where Teresa took the lead, but within a couple of years Maria became a virtually inseparable partner. Most of her life was taken up with long European tours, interrupted by the fatal deterioration in her health after a concert in Arlon on 22 July 1848.

Teresa was generally conceded to be the more gifted. The critic Henri Blanchard wrote in the Revue de Gazette Musicale de Paris:

Certainement Maria Milanollo est un phénomène musical; mais ce n'est qu'un délicieux joujou, une contrefaçon, une gentille imitation qui procède de Teresa Milanollo déjà grande artiste; et cependant Maria avec sa figure large, régulière, avec son grand œil bleu an regard assuré, semble encore plus sûre de l'avenir que sa sœur.

("Certainly, Maria Milanollo is a musical phenomenon; but it is nothing more than a delicious toy, a forgery, a gentle imitation which proceeds from Teresa Milanollo, already a great artist; and nevertheless, Maria, with her large, regular build, with her big blue eyes and their assured look, seems even more sure of the future than her sister.")

However, Maria's technique, according to Piero Faustini, despite lacking a truly individual style, often equalled Teresa's. In specific aspects, like articulating staccato notes, or executing clusters of notes in quick time, and in general expressions of brilliance or lightheartedness, she was unanimously considered superior, even to Teresa.

=== Teresa Milanollo's subsequent solo career ===
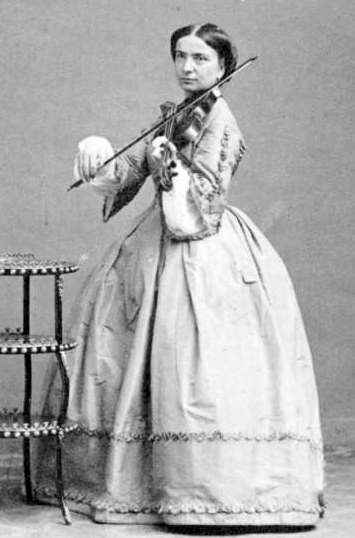
Violinist and composer Teresa Milanollo in 1862

After a period of mourning for Maria, during the next few years Teresa played only for charity. She established a series of concerts known as the "Concerts aux Pauvres". This was carried out

in nearly all the chief cities of France. Part of the receipts of these concerts was used for the benefit of the poor. Her plan was to follow up the first concert with a second, at which the audience consisted of poor school-children and their parents, to whom she played in her most fascinating manner, and, at the conclusion of her performance, money, food, and clothing, purchased with the receipts of the previous concerts, were distributed.

In 1852 she resumed touring in France, Switzerland, Germany, and Austria. Apparently her "improved performance" excited even more interest than before, and from 1853 to 1856 she was in the "zenith of her powers". Once, her skirt caught fire when she walked too close to the footlights during a concert in Aix-la-Chapelle. She calmly set down her violin, extinguished the flames, and continued performing.

==== Concerts in Colmar, 16 and 23 January 1851 ====
Teresa was 23 when she gave a sellout concert in Colmar, in Alsace, on 16 January 1851. A second one was organised for the 23rd. Gabriel Bräuner's article "Quand Colmar acceuillit la violiniste Teresa Milanollo" ("When Colmar welcomed the violinist Teresa Milanollo") describes the raptures of the critics of the Glaneur du Haut-Rhin, who compared her to Paganini. One known as G.F. praised her "langage si parfait, si simple que tous comprennent, parce qu'il va jusqu'au coeur." ("Language so perfect, so simple that all understand it, because it goes straight to the heart.") Another, H. Paraf, admired her mastery

de pincements de cordes, de coups d'ongle, de glissés, de sons harmoniques et de chants entrelacés sur double et triple corde. C'est un enchantement que d'entendre tour à tour, puis à la fois, soupirer, geindre, murmurer puis rire de notes plaintives, stridentes, grondeuses, langoureuses, ironiques ou passionnées, échos de mille voix qui se croisent, s'interrompent, déconcertent, s'attaquent et se confondent dans le pêle.

("plucking of strings, striking with the fingernails, glissandos, harmonic sounds and melodies interlaced on double and triple strings. It's an enchantment to hear, whether alternately or simultaneously, sighing, moaning, murmuring then laughing, notes plaintive, strident, growling, langourous, ironic or passionate, echoes of a thousand voices which cross, interrupt each other, disconcert, tackle and mingle in the confusion.")

To close the concert, Teresa played her own composition, a fantasy on Marlborough. Another critic in the Glaneur claimed that her violin possessed "une âme vivante" ("a living soul"). She could barely carry the bouquets which fell at her feet.

=== Marriage and retirement, 1857–1878 ===
Teresa is said to have given her last commercial public concert in Nancy on 16 April 1857 at the age of twenty-nine, and "later that day, married a military engineer and amateur musician named Theodore Parmentier" at the church of Saint Martin, Malzéville. Their reception, attended by "quantité «d’uniformes engalonnés d’or»" (many officers in gold-trimmed uniforms), was held in the garden of a house in the street of Chanoine Boulanger. At the time of their marriage, Captain Parmentier was aide-de-camp to General Niel, with whom he took part in the Siege of Sebastopol during the Crimean War. Parmentier later became a general.

Marriage signalled Teresa's retirement from a concert career. The couple took a house in Paris and lived there until October 1859, when they followed General Niel to Toulouse. From 1857 to 1878 she, as a soldier’s wife, "followed the fortunes of her husband", sporadically performing for charity in cities where her husband was stationed, even travelling as far as Constantine, Algeria. On 15 July 1860 a performance of Teresa's Ave Maria (Op. 2) was given at Mulhouse, by a choir of 800 male voices. The charitable motive became more urgent after Teresa's mother Antonia died in 1869, with the aggravated needs of the poor during the 1870 Franco-Prussian War. Excluding charity concerts, Teresa's very last public concert was in Paris, in 1872.

=== Later years, 1878–1904 ===
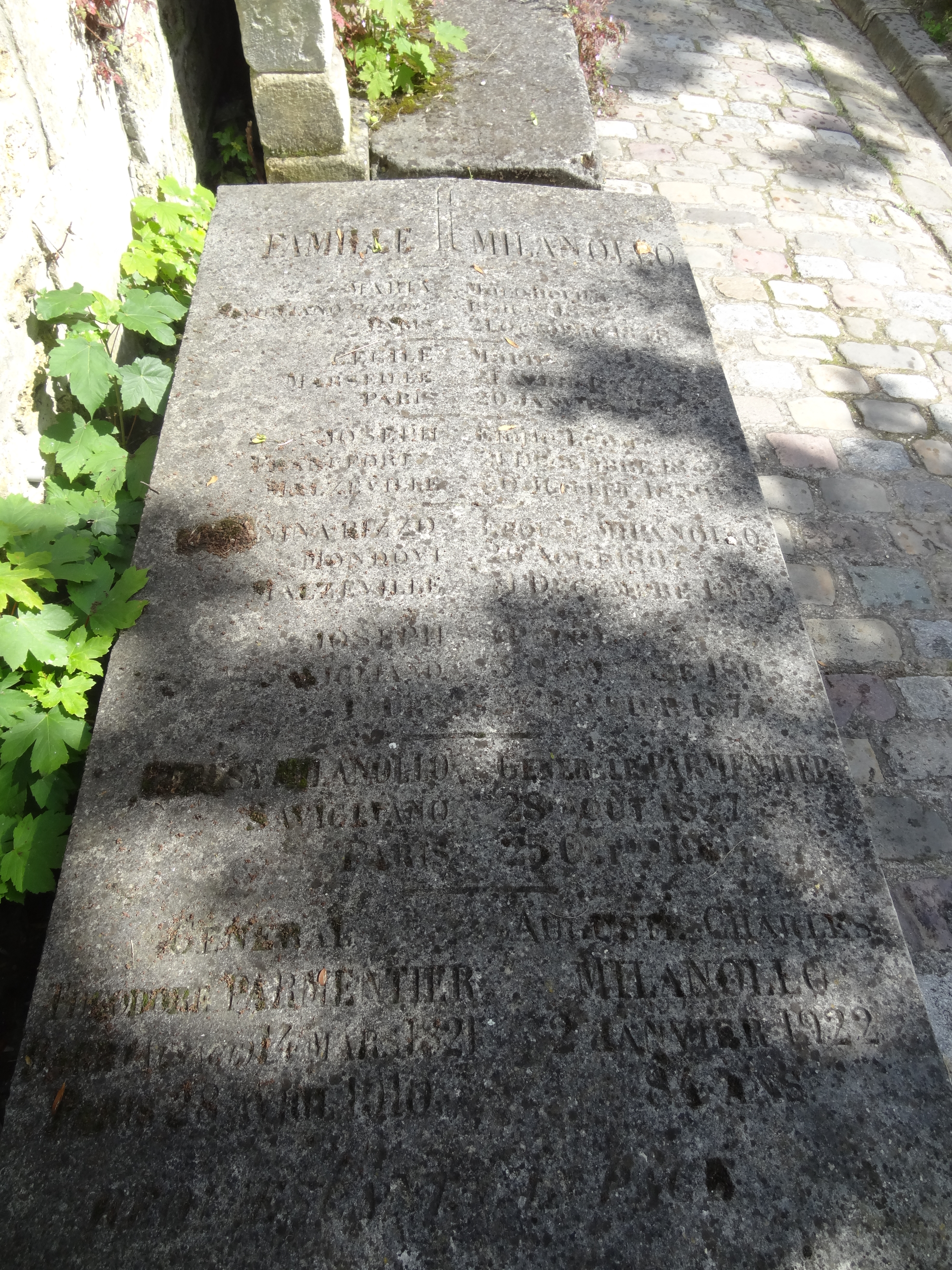
Grave in Pere Lachaise cemetery

Following the death of her father, Giuseppe Milanollo, on 27 February 1878, according to a contemporary account written in 1899,

the gallant General who is “Grand Officier de la Légion d’Honneur”, and his gifted and famous wife, have resided quietly in Paris; but, generous and accessible as ever, Madame Parmentier is still to be met by a fortunate few in select musical and social circles of the French capital.

Teresa Milanollo died on 25 October 1904, aged seventy-seven. The two sisters were buried at the Père Lachaise cemetery.

Teresa Milanollo donated many of the keepsakes and documents of her and her sister’s artistic career to the native town Savigliano. Nowadays these objects are displayed in the city museum "Antonino Olmo", in a dedicated room.

== Compositions ==
Teresa Milanollo's works, largely forgotten today, include:

- Ave Maria
- Chorus for male quartet
- Fantaisie élegiaque for violin (1853; written in memory of her sister and co-violinist, Maria)
- Two romances
- Transcriptions and variations for violin and pianoforte

In 2016, the CD "musica immortale" by violinist Valentina Busso and pianist Eliana Grasso, containing 7 of Milanollo's compositions was released by Musica Viva records.

== The Milanollo violins ==
Teresa Milanollo's violins included a 1728 Stradivarius and a c. 1680 Ruggieri, which had belonged to Paganini. It was sold in April 2010 by Tarisio Auctions. A book about Teresa's Ruggieri violin entitled Antonius and Hieronymus Amati, Die 'Maria Milanollo was published by Albert Berr, Bad Wiessee, in 1950.

Of the 1728 Stradivarius, its owner Domenico Dragonetti had written in his will: "I bequeath this violin, which was played by Paganini, to Teresa Milanollo." Teresa's "Dragonetti-Milanollo" violin has been played since 2004 by Corey Cerovsek, and formerly by Paganini and in 1794 by Viotti.

The small Ruggieri violin, the "Milanollo" violin, had formerly belonged to her sister Maria. The interior of the upper part of the instrument is inscribed with Maria's initials, "M.M."

A second Stradivarius was sold to Giuseppe Milanollo in 1841 and used by Teresa for more than five years, being resold by her father in 1851. It is known as "Milanollo-Hembert", and played today by Matteo Fedeli.

== Milanollo Theatre, Savigliano (Civico Teatro Milanollo) ==
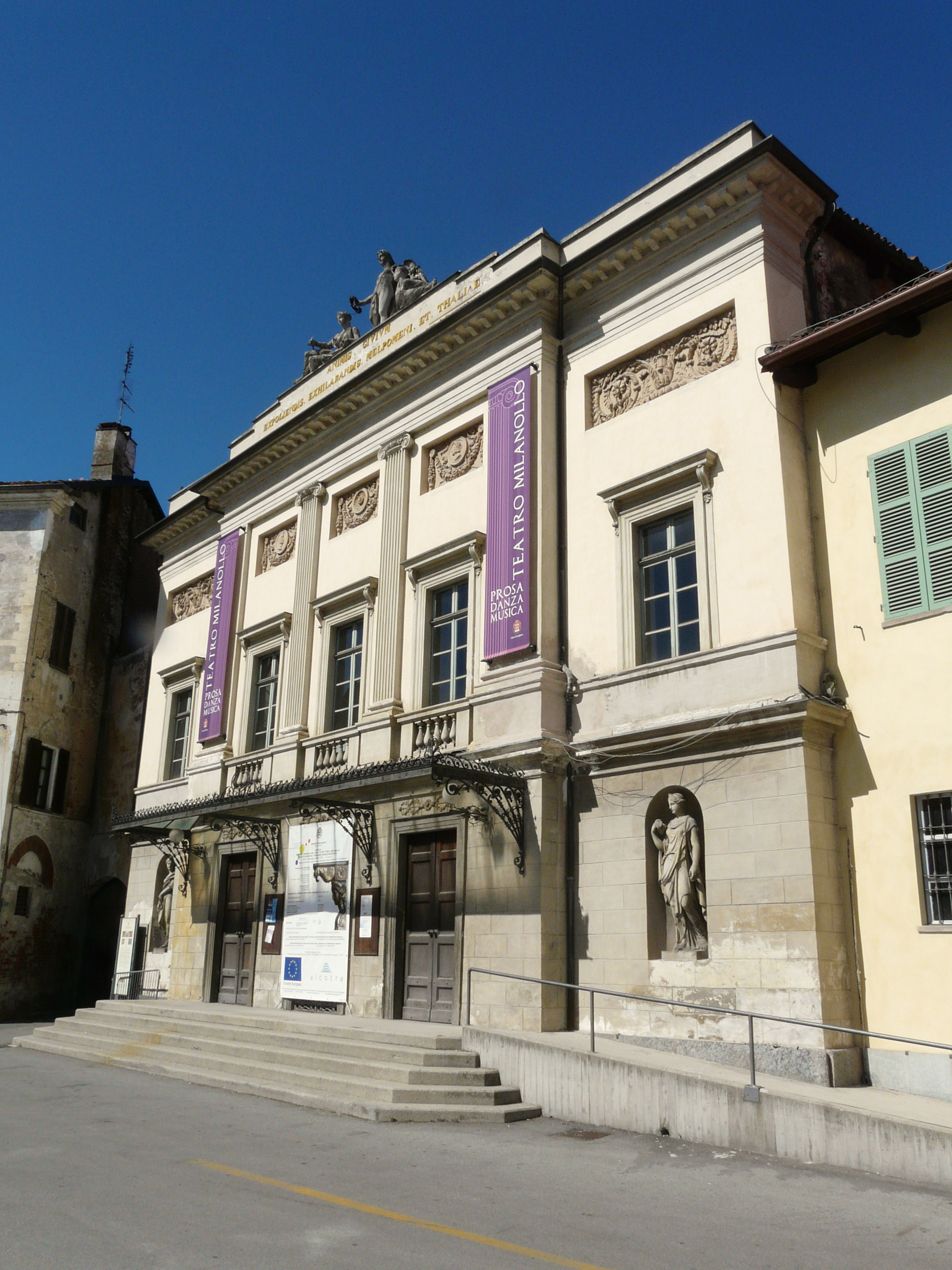
Teatro Milanollo in Savigliano, Piedmont

Designed by Maurizio Eula, the theatre was originally proposed in 1834 and completed in 1836. It was inaugurated with a performance of the opera The Exile from Rome, by Donizetti.

Outside, on the elegant cornice forming the base of the attic is a Latin epigraph expressing the building's dedication to two of the Muses:

A group of friends, having collected the money, (erected) in 1835 this theatre to Melpomene and Talia, with the aim of embellishing and enhancing the souls of the people.

The Milanollo Theatre has been described as “a delicate miniature" of the Palazzo Carignano in Turin. The Neoclassically inspired construction features a façade with statues portraying Comedy and Tragedy and a group with the Genius of Glory crowning Music and Poetry. There are floral bas-reliefs and round inserts containing portraits of the tragedian Vittorio Alfieri and the poet and opera seria librettist Metastasio.

The auditorium, decorated with stuccoes and gold, houses 350 spectators in three circles – stalls, gallery and "gods". The painting of Mount Parnassus on the curtain is by Angelo Moja. On the ceiling, a fresco by Pietro Ayres depicts Psyche and Apollo.

In 1899, the theatre was re-dedicated to the Milanollo sisters.

== The Coldstream march — "Milanollo" ==
The tune of "Milanollo" was written by the 19th-century German composer Johann Valentin Hamm for the Italian violinist virtuoso sisters and child prodigies, Teresa and Maria Milanollo. They introduced it to England in 1845 in the course of their extensive European tours.

In the 1880s it was officially authorised, along with all regimental marches, by the War Office as a regimental march for the Coldstream Guards. The Coldstream Guards adopted the march under the title "Milanollo" and the official arrangement was authorised in 1882. From 1907 to 1936 it was known as "The Coldstream March", and republished under that title in 1925. The current arrangement was written by one of the Coldstream Guards' former Directors of Music, John Mackenzie Rogan, and it is known today as "The Coldstream March – Milanollo". Other regiments that adopted it include the Life Guards, the Suffolk Regiment, and the Governor General's Foot Guards.
