= Lillibullero =

1686 march by Henry Purcell

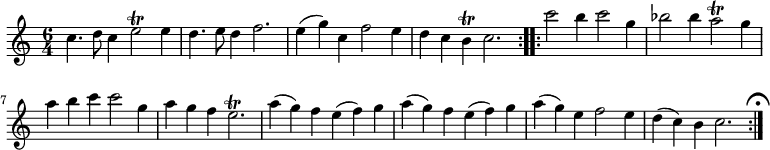
Quickstep from Henry Purcell's 1686 march that is the tune for "Lillibullero"

"Lillibullero" (also spelt Lillibulero, Lilliburlero, or Lilli Burlero) is a march attributed to Henry Purcell. Thomas Wharton wrote lyrics for the song. It became popular in England at the time of the Glorious Revolution of 1688. Many alternative lyrics have been written for the melody.

== Background ==
The melody of "Lillibulero" is attributed to Henry Purcell. It is unclear whether he composed the tune or simply arranged it. It was first published in The Delightful Companion, John Playford's 1686 method book for recorder. The famous melody appears in the second half of a quickstep by Purcell. No original manuscript has been found. Writing over 200 years later, William Chappell surmised that Purcell's tune deserves nine-tenths of the credit for the popularity of the song.

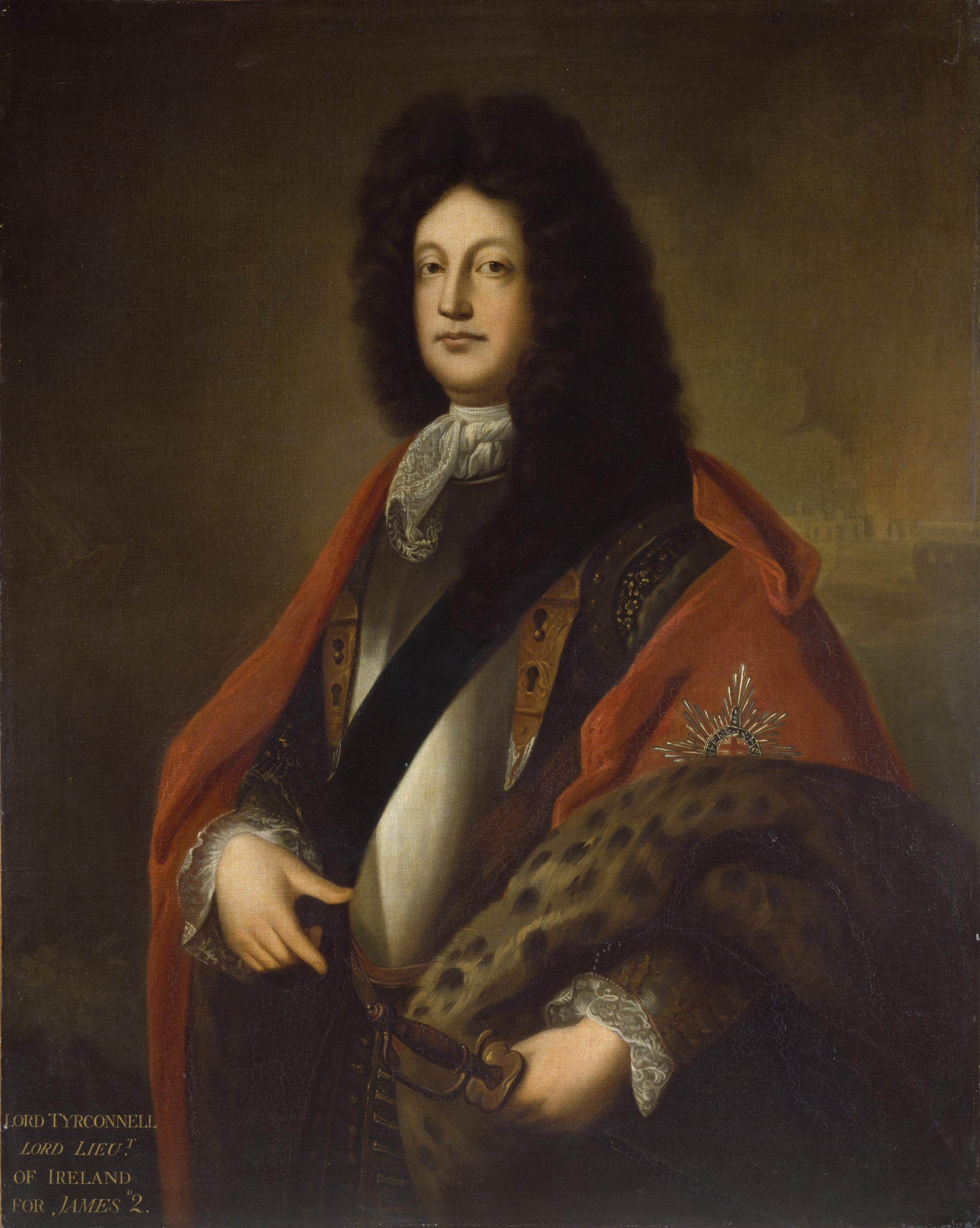
Richard Talbot, 1st Earl of Tyrconnell, the subject of the song

Also in 1686, Thomas, Lord Wharton composed lyrics for Purcell's tune. The rakish Wharton was satirizing King James II's appointment of Richard Talbot, 1st Earl of Tyrconnell as Lord Deputy of Ireland. Wharton's conceit is a sarcastic conversation between two Irishmen about the imminent arrival of the Catholic Talbot, and its dire implications for the Protestants. "Lilliburlero" (with -rl) was the watchword used by Irish Catholics during the Irish Rebellion of 1641.

The song initially made very little impression on the public. However, when James II began transferring Irish regiments to England in 1688, broadsides of the lyrics were printed, and "Lillibullero" became immensely popular by October. It spread as a popular street song in English towns, and especially inside English barracks to mock the arriving Irish regiments. During the Glorious Revolution, the Whigs virtually adopted "Lillibullero" as their anthem.

The next month, William of Orange invaded, and "Lillibullero" became even more commonplace. Even the palace guards supposedly loyal to James II were heard singing it. A second part was published to the song as William advanced. The language of the second part is even rougher as two Irish soldiers stationed in England pine for home since the English hate them anyway.

Wharton boasted that he had "sung a deluded Prince out of three kingdoms". Many alternate versions cropped up during these tumultuous days. By 17 November an anti-Dutch parody of the original, "A New Song Upon the Hogen Mogens", was in circulation, drawing on popular animosity against the Dutch, who had been the national enemy for a generation, to counter the original's appeal.

== Lyrics ==
"Lillibullero bullen a la" is repeated after every line in each verse.

1686 Version

Ho, brother Teague, dost hear the decree?
Lillibullero bullen a la
We are to have a new deputy
Lillibullero bullen a la

Refrain:
Lero Lero Lillibullero
Lillibullero bullen a la
Lero Lero Lero Lero
Lillibullero bullen a la

Oh by my soul it is a Talbot
And he will cut every Englishman's throat (Refrain)

Though, by my soul, the English do prate
The law's on their side and the devil knows what (Refrain)

But if dispense do come from the Pope
We'll hang Magna Carta and themselves on a rope (Refrain)

And the good Talbot is now made a Lord
And with his brave lads he's coming aboard (Refrain)

Who all in France have taken a swear,
That they will have no Protestant heir (Refrain)

Now Tyrconnell is come ashore
And we shall have commissions galore (Refrain)

And everyone that won't go to Mass
He will be turned out to look like an ass (Refrain)

Now the heretics all go down
By Christ and Saint Patrick's the nation's our own (Refrain)

There was an old prophecy found in a bog
The country'd be ruled by an ass and a dog (Refrain)

Now this prophecy is all come to pass
For Talbot's the dog and Tyrconnell's the ass (Refrain)

1688 Version

By Chreist, my dear Morish, vat maukes de sho' sad ?
The heretics jear us and mauke me mad. (Refrain)

Pox take me, dear Teague, but I am in a rage,
Poo', what impidence is in dish age? (Refrain)

Vat if Dush should come as dey hope,
To up hang us for all de dispense of de Pope? (Refrain)

Dey shay dat Tyrconnel's a friend to de mash,
For which he's a traitor, a pimp, and an ass. (Refrain)

Ara', plague tauke me know, I make a swar,
I to Shent Tyburn will mauke a great prayer. (Refrain)

Oh, I will pray to Shent Patrick's frock,
Or to Loreto's sacred smock. (Refrain)

Now, a pox tauke me, what dost dow tink,
De English confusion to Popery drink. (Refrain)

And, by my shoul, de mash house pull down,
While dey were swearing de Mayor of de town. (Refrain)

Oh, fait and be, I'll mauke de decree,
And swar by de Chancellor's modesty; (Refrain)

Dat I no longer in English will stay,
For be Goad, dey will hang us out of de way. (Refrain)

=== Meaning ===
The first Irish Roman Catholic to serve as Lord Deputy of Ireland in nearly 200 years, Talbot quickly filled the army in Ireland with Catholic officers (hence "we will have commissions galore") and recruits, alarming the Protestants and raising the hopes of the Irish Catholic community for a restoration of their lands and political power ("by Christ and St Patrick, the nation's our own"). The Catholic resurgence created fears amongst Irish Protestants of a massacre, similar to that which had happened in the Irish Rebellion of 1641.

The song parodies Irish faith in prophecy while mocking the English for believing that Providence would guide them to victory. Talbot, as well as being a name, is a breed of hound or hunting dog. The song's title and the words of the refrain have been interpreted as a garbled version of the Irish words An Lile ba léir é, ba linn an lá, "The Lily was everywhere and ours was the day (i.e., we won )". The lily may be a reference to the fleur de lis of France or to William Lilly, the most celebrated astrologer of the mid-seventeenth century. Lilly was a Parliamentarian who accurately predicted the Royalist defeats at Naseby and Colchester. Alternatively, the lyrics could mean, "Lilly is clear [about this], the day will be ours". It is also thought that "Lilli" is a familiar form of William, and that bullero comes from the Irish "Buaill Léir ó", which gives: "William defeated all that remained".

Professor Breandán Ó Buachalla has claimed that they are a garbled version of the Irish sentence "Leir o, Leir o, leir o, leiro, Lilli bu leir o: bu linn an la, " which he translates as "Manifest, manifest, manifest, manifest, Lilly will be manifest, the day will be ours" referring to a possible prophecy of an Irish victory by the astrologer William Lilly.

=== The Beggar's Opera ===
Purcell's music provided the tune for the highwayman Macheath's satire on modern society in John Gay's The Beggar's Opera, which first premiered in 1728, using popular folk tunes for its score. Here, the lyrics are:

The Modes of the Court so common are grown,
That a true Friend can hardly be met;
Friendship for Interest is but a Loan,
Which they let out for what they can get.
'Tis true, you find
Some Friends so kind,
Who will give you good Counsel themselves to defend.
In sorrowful Ditty,
They promise, they pity,
But shift for your Money, from Friend to Friend.

=== Protestant Boys ===
One of the best-known parodies of "Lillibullero" is the Ulster Protestant folk lyric called "Protestant Boys". The song is played by flute bands accompanying the Orange Order during Orange or band-only parades, which have been the subject of controversy during the Troubles in Northern Ireland.

There are two versions of "Protestant Boys", both sung to the tune of "Lillibullero". They begin as follows:

Version 1
The Protestant Boys are loyal and true
Stout hearted in battle and stout-handed too
The Protestant Boys are true to the last
And faithful and peaceful when danger has passed
And Oh! they bear and proudly wear
The colours that floated o'er many a fray
Where cannon were flashing
And sabres were clashing
The Protestant Boys still carried the day.

Version 2
Tell me, my friends, why are we met here?
Why thus assembled, ye Protestant Boys?
Do mirth and good liquor, good humour, good cheer,
Call us to share of festivity's joys?
Oh, no! 'tis the cause,
Of king – freedom – and laws,
That calls loyal Protestants now to unite;
And Orange and Blue,
Ever faithful and true,
Our king shall support, and sedition a fright.

=== Nottingham Ale ===
"Nottingham Ale" is an English drinking song sung to the tune of "Lillibullero".

The historian Blackner relates that a person of the name Gunthorpe, who within memory of persons then living [1815] kept the Punch Bowl, a public house in Peck Lane, Nottingham, sent a barrel of ale of his own brewing as a present to his brother, an officer in the navy, who in return composed this poetic epistle. It appears to have been a popular song around the end of the 18th century and was one which Goldsmith enjoyed especially when sung by one of the comic singers who frequented one of his haunts in London.

It was sung at the launching ceremony of the Nottingham, an East Indiaman, on 7 March 1787, at Clevey's yard in Gravesend. The ship was 1,152 tons, had a crew of 144, and was one of the largest and fastest ever built.

Fair Venus, the goddess of beauty and love
Arose from the froth which swam on the sea.
Minerva leapt out of the cranium of Jove,
A coy, sullen slut, as most authors agree.
Bold Bacchus, they tell us, the prince of good fellas
Was a natural son, pray attend to my tale
And they that thus chatter, mistake quite the matter
He sprung from a barrel of Nottingham Ale!

Nottingham Ale, boys, Nottingham Ale
No liquor on earth is like Nottingham Ale!
Nottingham Ale, boys, Nottingham Ale
No liquor on earth like Nottingham Ale!

And having survey'd well the cask whence he sprung
For want of more liquor, low spirited grew
He mounted astride, to the jolly cask clung
And away to the gods and the goddess flew.
But when he look'd down and saw the fair town
To pay it due honours, not likely to fail
He swore that on earth 'twas the town of his birth
And the best – and no liquor like Nottingham ale.

Ye bishops and deacons, priests, curates and vicars
When once you have tasted, you'll own it is true
That Nottingham Ale, it's the best of all liquors
And who understands the good creature like you.
It expels every vapour, saves pen, ink, and paper
And when you're disposed from the pulpit to rail
T'will open your throats, you may preach without notes
When inspired with a bumper of Nottingham Ale.

Ye doctors who more execution have done
With powder and bolus, with potion and pill
Than hangman with halter, or soldier with gun
Than miser with famine, a lawyer with quill
To dispatch us the quicker, you forbid us malt liquor
Till our bodies consume and our faces grow pale.
But mind it what pleases and cures all diseases
Is a comfortable dose of good Nottingham Ale.

Ye poets, who brag of the Helicon brook,
The nectar of gods, and the juice of the vine,
You say none can write well, except they invoke
The friendly assistance of one of the nine.
Hers liquor surpasses the stream of Parnassus,
The nectar Ambrosia, on which gods regale.
Experience will show it, nought makes a good poet
Like quantum sufficit of Nottingham ale.

=== Overtures from Richmond ===
Yet another set of lyrics set to the tune at the time of the American Civil War is attributed to the ballad scholar Francis J. Child, born in Boston in 1825. It is a satire on Jefferson Davis and the Confederacy, and perhaps refers to the Hampton Roads Conference.

"Well, Uncle Sam," says Jefferson D.,
Lilliburlero, old Uncle Sam,
"You'll have to join my Confed'racy,"
Lilliburlero, old Uncle Sam.
"Lero, lero, that don't appear-o,
That don't appear," says old Uncle Sam,
"Lero, lero, filibustero,
That don't appear," says old Uncle Sam.

"So, Uncle Sam, just lay down your arms,"
Lilliburlero, old Uncle Sam,
"Then you shall hear my reas'nable terms,"
Lilliburlero, old Uncle Sam.
"Lero, lero, I'd like to hear-o
I'd like to hear," says old Uncle Sam,
"Lero, lero, filibustero,
I'd like to hear," says old Uncle Sam.

"First you must own I've beat you in a fight,"
Lilliburlero, old Uncle Sam,
"then that I always have been in the right,"
Lilliburlero, old Uncle Sam.
"Lero, lero, rather severe-o,
rather severe," says old Uncle Sam,
"Lero, lero, filibustero,
Rather severe," says old Uncle Sam.

"Then you must pay my national debts,"
Lilliburlero, old Uncle Sam,
"No questions asked about my assets,"
Lilliburlero, old Uncle Sam.
"Lero, lero, that's very dear-o,
That's very dear," says old Uncle Sam,
"Lero, lero, filibustero,
That's very dear," says old Uncle Sam.

"Also some few IOUs and bets,"
Lilliburlero, old Uncle Sam,
"Mine, and Bob Toombs', and Sidell's and Rhett's,"
Lilliburlero, old Uncle Sam.
"Lero, lero, that leaves me zero,
That leaves me zero," says Uncle Sam,
"Lero, lero, filibustero,
That leaves me zero," says Uncle Sam.

"And by the way, one little thing more,"
Lilliburlero, old Uncle Sam,
"You're to refund the costs of the war,"
Lilliburlero, old Uncle Sam.
"Lero, lero, just what I fear-o,
Just what I fear," says old Uncle Sam,
"Lero, lero, filibustero,
Just what I fear," says old Uncle Sam.

"Next you must own our Cavalier blood!"
Lilliburlero, old Uncle Sam,
"And that your Puritans sprang from the mud!"
Lilliburlero, old Uncle Sam.
"Lero, lero, that mud is clear-o,
That mud is clear," says old Uncle Sam,
"Lero, lero, filibustero,
That mud is clear," says old Uncle Sam.

"Slavery's, of course, the chief corner-stone,"
Lilliburlero, old Uncle Sam,
"Of our new civilisation!"
Lilliburlero, old Uncle Sam.
"Lero, lero, that's quite sincere-o,
That's quite sincere," says old Uncle Sam,
"Lero, lero, filibustero,
That's quite sincere," says old Uncle Sam.

"You'll understand, my recreant tool,"
Lilliburlero, old Uncle Sam,
"You're to submit, and we are to rule,"
Lilliburlero, old Uncle Sam.
"Lero, lero, aren't you a hero!
Aren't you a hero," says Uncle Sam,
"Lero, lero, filibustero,
Aren't you a hero," says Uncle Sam.

"If to these terms you fully consent,"
Lilliburlero, old Uncle Sam,
"I'll be perpetual King-President,"
Lilliburlero, old Uncle Sam.
"Lero, lero, take your sombrero,
Off to your swamps," says old Uncle Sam,
"Lero, lero, filibustero,
Cut, double quick!" says old Uncle Sam.

=== The Farmer's Curst Wife ===
In recent times, the melody and refrain of Lillibullero are frequently paired with lyrics from the ballad The Farmer's Curst Wife. The lyrics tell the story of a ploughman's wife who is taken away to Hell by the Devil, but is subsequently returned to Earth due to her violent acts against demons.

Lyrics from "The Farmer's Curst Wife" were used in the version of "Lillibullero" recorded by Bellowhead in their 2012 album Broadside, and in the version recorded by the band The City Waites in their 1976 self-titled album.

=== There Was an Old Woman ===
The 19th-century nursery rhyme "There Was an Old Woman Tossed Up in a Basket", published in the collection Mother Goose has also been sung to this tune.

== In popular culture ==
=== Broadcasting ===
"Lillibullero" was adopted by the British Broadcasting Corporation's World War II programme Into Battle and became the unofficial march of the Commandos of the British Army. Since its association with the BBC's role in the war, various recordings of "Lillibullero" have been played by the BBC as an interval signal. These include a marching band and a symphony orchestra.

David Cox arranged the version used for over 30 years. During the 1970s a rousing recording by the band of HM Royal Marines used just before the BBC World Service News on the hour was replaced by a weaker and quieter version by a brass ensemble, on the grounds that the band record had worn out. However, the Marines version was later reinstated. The most recent recording, written by David Arnold and performed by a string orchestra, was played on the World Service several times a day until 2008, when a new theme, by David Lowe was introduced. A shortened version is currently sometimes played just before each hour before the news.

A well-regarded argument for the persistence of Lillibullero as a signature tune of the BBC World Service was that its powerful and simple structure was an effective means of identifying the broadcaster. The engineers who selected it were unaware of its origins, though a BBC World Service history states that the choice of interval theme at the time was that of "the transmission engineers who found it particularly audible through short wave mush, and anyway [the BBC] knew it as a tune for the old English song 'There was an old woman tossed up in a blanket, 20 times as high as the moon'.

The BBC Persian Television service, initiated in 2009, makes use of a re-mixed version of Lillibullero as the title theme for its music programmes. Both the music magazine and music documentaries have cuts of the tune with Persian instrumental influence. It was also used for the BBC World Service Television service broadcast in Europe and Asia during the early 1990s.

=== Military ===
"Lillibullero" is the official regimental march of the Royal Electrical and Mechanical Engineers.

"Lillibullero" is also an official march of the Corps of Royal Canadian Electrical and Mechanical Engineers as well as the Corps of Royal Australian Electrical and Mechanical Engineers.

=== Fiction ===
Laurence Sterne's experimental and comic novel Tristram Shandy prints the score to "Lillibullero" at the end of Chapter 17 in Book 9 after Tristram's uncle, Captain Toby Shandy, whistles the tune. A British Army veteran of the fighting in Ireland and the Low Countries during King William's reign, Toby whistles "Lillibullero" when he is offered any opinion or argument which would require passionate rebuttal or which he finds embarrassing or upsetting.

In Sir Walter Scott's novel Waverley, the highland Chieftain Fergus Mac-Ivor sings a verse of "Lillibulero" during a dinner before he and his comrades prepare for battle on the side of the Pretender.

One of the scoundrels in Robert Louis Stevenson's Treasure Island (Chapter XVI) whistles the tune, whose title is mentioned four times.

One of Kage Baker's principal characters of The Life of the World to Come, Alec, loves this tune and it is referenced by him several times. This is likely connected to his well-known love for Robert Louis Stevenson's Treasure Island.

Neal Stephenson's Baroque Cycle also makes mention of Lillibulero's use as anti-Catholic propaganda.

In the movie Barry Lyndon (1975) Lillibullero is heard near the start as Barry's regiment assembles at Swords Castle to embark for the Seven Years' War.

The tune is used in The Last Man Out and Raid on Rommel. The tune is also used during the title credits in the period adventure East of Sudan (1964).

In Frederick Forsyth's novel The Afghan, one of the protagonists, Terry Martin, has Lillibullero as his ringtone on his mobile phone.

In the Doctor Who story "Mawdryn Undead", the theme can be heard coming from the Brigadier of 1977's radio.

=== Music ===
Henry Purcell subsequently arranged the melody for a keyboard piece titled "A New Irish Tune". The composition was a contribution to a method book for virginals and harpsichords called Musick's Hand-Maid. "A New Irish Tune" was included in the Second Part of Musick's Hand-Maid, published by Henry Playford.

A French version is known as the Marche du Prince d'Orange, and is attributed to Louis XIV's court composers Philidor the Elder and Jean-Baptiste Lully.

The basic melody of "Lillibulero" appears to have been adapted by Wolfgang Amadeus Mozart for the theme of the first movement of his Piano Sonata No. 11 in A major, K. 331 (1783). Since then, other composers have written variations on the Mozartean theme in which the relationship to Lillibulero is made even clearer, for example, Max Reger's Variations and Fugue on a Theme by Mozart, Op. 132 (1914).

In 1936 Walter Niemann wrote Kleine Variationen uber eine alt-irische Volksweise (Little Variations on an Old Irish Folksong), Op. 146, but a footnote acknowledges Purcell's authorship of the theme.

Michael Longcor adapted "Lillibullero" as a setting for Rudyard Kipling's poem "Brown Bess" on his album, Norman and Saxon.

Folk-punk protest singer Billy Bragg also adapted the tune, in 2009, as the setting for his song "Constitution Hill", later released on the 2009 album Fight Songs.
