= Charles Philippe Lafont =

French violinist and composer (1781–1839)

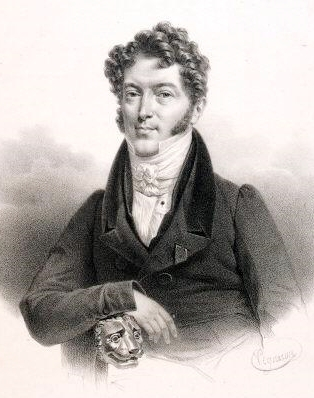
- Charles Philippe Lafont. Portrait by Pierre-Roch Vigneron.
- Born: Charles Philippe Lafont; 1 December 1781; Paris, France
- Died: 23 August 1839 (aged 57); Tarbes, France
- Occupations: Violinist, Composer

Charles Philippe Lafont (1 December 1781 – 23 August 1839) was a French violinist and composer. He has been characterized as one of the most eminent violinists of the French school.

== Biography ==
Born in Paris, he received his first lessons from his mother. He later studied with Rodolphe Kreutzer and Pierre Rode. His teachers taught him the classical technique of the Viotti school, which he made more brilliant.

As early as 1792, he toured Germany and other parts of Europe giving successful concerts. On the outbreak of the French Revolution, he left France, travelling through Europe. In 1808, he became chamber violinist to Tsar Alexander I of Russia. In 1815, he returned to France to become first violinist of the royal chamber musicians of Louis XVIII and musical accompanist to the Duchess of Berry. In 1816, he participated in a contest with Niccolò Paganini, in which neither won. However, the contest was held in La Scala, where the audience was more sympathetic to Paganini.

Few of his compositions have survived. In c. 1837, Franz Liszt wrote a Grand Duo concertant sur la Romance de M. Lafont "Le Marin", for violin and piano, S. 128 (revised c. 1849). He was also a singer, but he is mostly remembered as a virtuoso violinist.

He died in an accident in 1839, when a carriage transporting him overturned.
