= David Cox (composer) =

British composer

David Vassall Cox (Broadstairs, 4 February 1916 - Pratt's Bottom, 31 January 1997) was a British composer and writer on music who for most of his professional life was music coordinator for the BBC World Service. Among his arrangements was Lillibullero, which introduced hourly World Service news broadcasts.

== Life and music ==
Cox was born in Broadstairs, Kent, but his family soon moved to Australia. He returned to England in 1935, aged 19, to study at the Royal College of Music, where his teachers were Ralph Vaughan Williams, Herbert Howells and Arthur Benjamin. He was also an organ scholar at Worcester College, Oxford, until 1940. During the war he joined the RAF, playing the clarinet in the RAF Band, mostly at Cranwell in Lincolnshire.

Cox joined the BBC in 1946, initially as a music producer for the Latin-American Service, then on the Third Programme, and finally as Music Organiser for the BBC External Services in 1956, a post he held until retirement in 1976.

The choral cantata The Summer's Nightingale, first performed and broadcast in 1955, was revived in 1984 at a BBC concert in Manchester. A year before his death, a concert marking his 80th birthday was held at All Saints' Church, Tudeley, reviving several of his works, including the Five Songs after John Milton and extracts from the cantata Of Beasts. Cox also composed music for BBC radio productions of The Plague in 1966 and The Opium Eaters.

David Cox married his first wife Barbara Butcher in 1954. She died in 1982. He married again, to Sybil Bell in 1992. Alison Cox OBE, his daughter from the first marriage, is a composer, a teacher and (since 1988) Head of Composition at the Purcell School for Young Musicians in Hertfordshire. In 2005, she founded The Commonwealth Resounds, a musical NGO and a registered charity.

== Lilliburlero ==
At the BBC Cox arranged various signature tunes, including Lilliburlero, which was first heard on the World Service in 1943. His arrangement, usually preceded by the words "This is London", remained in use for over 30 years. (The most recent version was arranged by David Arnold). For the 50th anniversary of the BBC's External Services in 1982 he composed the overture London Calling, which incorporates Lilliburlero and other themes associated with the service, such as Oranges and Lemons and the chimes of Big Ben. It was first performed in the Royal Albert Hall in November 1982, conducted by Norman Del Mar.

== Selected works ==
- The Summer's Nightingale, cantata on texts by Sir Walter Raleigh (1955)
- Of Beasts choral cantata to six medieval texts (1955)
- Three Songs from John Donne (1959)
- Songs of Earth and Air for chorus on texts of Dryden (1960)
- A Greek Cantata for chorus (1967)
- The Children of the Forest, opera (1969)
- Five Songs after John Milton (1975)
- London Calling, overture (1982)
- The Magical Island, soprano, recorder and piano
- This Child of Life, Christmas cantata
- Out of Doors suite for piano

== Books ==
- 'Ralph Vaughan Williams'. In Robert Simpson (ed.) The Symphony: Elgar to the Present Day (1967)
- Debussy Orchestral Music (1974 - BBC Music Guide)
- The Henry Wood Proms (1980)
- Peter Warlock: a centenary celebration, compiled and edited with John Bishop (1994)
