= The Keel Row =

English folk song from the Tyneside

"The Keel Row" (Roud 3059) is a traditional Tyneside folk song evoking the life and work of the keelmen of Newcastle upon Tyne. A closely related song was first published in a Scottish collection of the 1770s, but may be considerably older, and it is unclear whether the tune is Scottish or English in origin.

The opening lines of the song set it in Sandgate, that part of the quayside overlooking the River Tyne to the east of the city centre where the keelmen lived and which is still overlooked by the Keelmen's Hospital.

== Origins ==
Versions of the song appear in both England and Scotland, with Scottish versions referring to the Canongate rather than Sandgate. The earliest printing was in the 1770s in Edinburgh in A Collection of Favourite Scots Tunes, edited by Charles Maclean, though the tune was also found in several late eighteenth-century English manuscript collections. Frank Kidson surmised that like many other songs collected by Maclean it may originally have been a Jacobite air from the time of the 1745 rebellion. Some versions of the song make reference to a "blue bonnet ... with a snowy rose upon it", a clear attempt to evoke Jacobite symbolism, whether dating from 1745 or not.

Kidson stated that he had found the tune of "The Keel Row" associated with a dance called "The Yorkshire Lad" as early as 1748. The tune under its present title, together with a long and elaborate set of variations, also appeared in the John Smith manuscript, now lost, which was dated 1752. In about 1886–87, John Stokoe copied this and 19 other tunes; he commented "there are many of the old Northumbrian pipe tunes in it" and claimed "so far as I know or have searched, this is the earliest copy of our Tyneside melody extant." Another early appearance of "The Keel Row" is in the William Vickers manuscript, dated 1770, also from Tyneside.

In the 19th century variants of the song appeared in Joseph Ritson's Northumberland Garland and Cuthbert Sharp's Bishoprick Garland. By this time the tune was well associated with the River Tyne but was also sung further south on the River Wear. A few years before the 1850s the keelmen had met yearly to celebrate the founding of the Keelmen's Hospital, perambulating the town to the accompaniment of bands playing "The Keel Row".

== Lyrics ==
As I came thro' Sandgate,
Thro' Sandgate, thro' Sandgate,
As I came thro' Sandgate,
I heard a lassie sing:
"O, weel may the keel row,
The keel row, the keel row,
O weel may the keel row
That my laddie's in."

"He wears a blue bonnet,
Blue bonnet, blue bonnet,
He wears a blue bonnet
A dimple in his chin.
And weel may the keel row,
The keel row, the keel row,
And weel may the keel row
That my laddie's in."

The traditional set of words, above, were later augmented by other versions. One, the "New Keel Row", was printed by Stokoe along with the original lyrics, having first been composed by Thomas Thompson and printed in 1827. Its first two stanzas are now often sung with the traditional ones:

"O wha's like my Johnnie,
Sae leish, sae blithe, sae bonnie?
He's foremost 'mang the mony
Keel lads o' coaly Tyne;

He'll set or row sae tightly
Or, in the dance sae sprightly,
He'll cut and shuffle sightly,
'Tis true, were he nae mine."

Other lyrics, printed in 1838, were said to then be the "favourite" song of the keelmen themselves and "the most popular melody on the Tyne":

"Weel may the keel row, the keel row, the keel row,
Weel may the keel row,
And better may she speed;

Weel may the keel row, the keel row, the keel row,
Weel may the keel row,
That gets the bairns their breed."

Due to its quick beat, the tune of "The Keel Row" is used as the trot march of the Life Guards of the Household Cavalry as well as of the Royal Horse Artillery. The writer Rudyard Kipling mentioned the tune in one of his accounts of army life in India under the British Raj: "The man who has never heard the 'Keel Row' rising high and shrill above the sound of the regiment...has something yet to hear and understand". The tune is also used by the Royal Gurkha Rifles, and was used by The Light Infantry as its double past, and is used (as part of a medley with "The Road to the Isles") by The Rifles.

== Tune ==
Tune – traditional (before 1770)

== Popular adaptations ==
Pete Seeger used the melody in his 1973 song, Well May the World Go. Oli Steadman included it on his song collection "365 Days Of Folk".

The tune is used as a march to accompany the progress of the Queen of Hearts in Jonathan Miller's film adaptation of Alice in Wonderland (1966)
