= Here's a Health unto His Majesty =

English patriotic song

"Here's a Health unto His Majesty" is an English patriotic song or glee. It was used as the regimental march of the Royal Army Medical Corps until its amalgamation in 2024, having been selected by Brigadier Hugh Llewellyn Glyn Hughes in 1948. It is now the regimental march of the Royal Army Medical Service. Note the song is never "Here's A Health unto Her Majesty".

== History ==
It dates from the reign of King Charles II, and was composed by Jeremy Savile, a prominent teacher "for the voyce or viol" during the English Commonwealth and Restoration in London. The music was first published in John Playford's The Musical Companion of 1667, arranged for three voices; treble, tenor and bass, together with the lyrics for single verse:

"Here's a health unto His Majesty,
With a fa la la la la la la,
Confusion to his enemies,
With a fa la la la la la la.
And he who would not drink his health,
We wish him neither wit nor wealth,
Nor yet a rope to hang himself.
With a fal lal la la la la la la la la,
With a fal lal la la la la la."

The song became popular again during the near-fatal illness of King George V in 1928, sometimes being sung in theatres before God Save the King.
