= Senior enlisted advisor =

Armed forces position

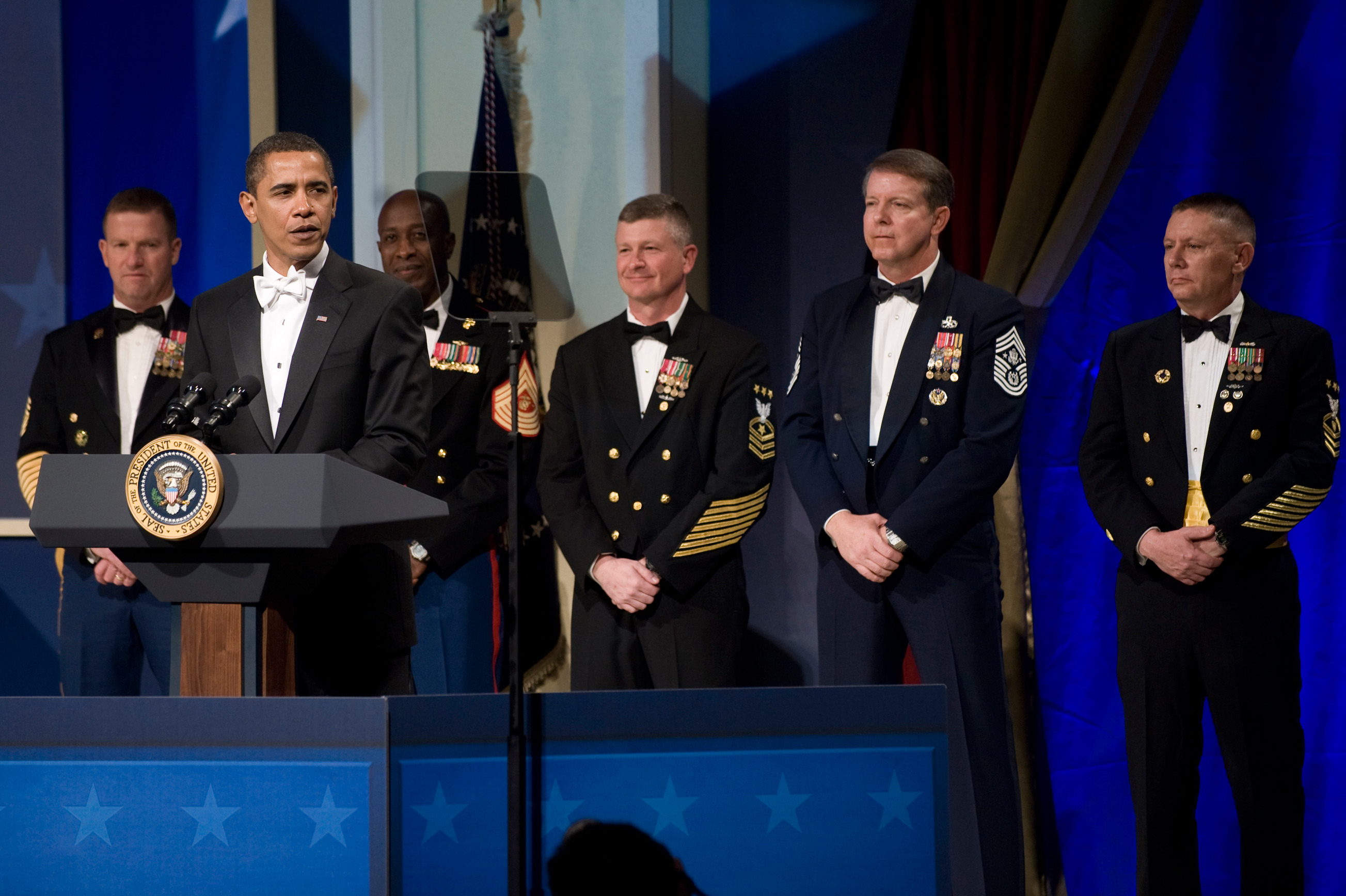
U.S. SEAs from each branch at the 2009 Commander in Chief's Ball

A senior enlisted advisor (SEA) is the most senior enlisted service member in a unit, and acts as an advisor to the commanding officer.

== Australia ==
In Australia the equivalent positions within the Royal Australian Navy (RAN), Australian Army and Royal Australian Air Force (RAAF) are Warrant Officer of the Navy (WO-N), Regimental Sergeant Major-Army (RSM-A) and Warrant Officer of the Air Force (WOFF-AF) respectively. On 20 June 2023 the Chief of the Defence Force General Angus Campbell announced the creation of the position of Senior Enlisted Advisor to the Chief of the Defence Force (SEAC) and that the outgoing Joint Operations Warrant Officer, Warrant Officer Ken Robertson would assume the position effective 1 July 2023.

Service senior enlisted advisors
Rank insignia	Position	Photo	Incumbent	Service branch	Start date
	Senior Enlisted Advisor to the Chief of the Defence Force		Warrant Officer; Ken Robertson	Royal Australian Air Force	July 1, 2023
	Warrant Officer of the Navy		Warrant Officer; Andrew Bertoncin OAM	Royal Australian Navy	December 16, 2022
	Regimental Sergeant Major - Army		Warrant Officer; Kim Felmingham; NSC, OAM	Australian Army	July 1, 2022
	Warrant Officer of the Air Force		Warrant Officer; Ralph Clifton	Royal Australian Air Force	December 1, 2022

== Canada ==
The Senior Enlisted advisor of the Canadian Forces is the Canadian Forces Chief Warrant Officer. The Army, Navy and Air Force each have their own Chief Warrant Officer acting as Senior Enlisted advisor.

Service senior enlisted advisors
Rank insignia	Position	Photo	Incumbent	Start date	Service branch	Ref.
	Canadian Forces Chief Warrant Officer		Chief Warrant Officer; Bob McCann MMM, MSM, CD	14 April 2023	Canadian Army	
	Command Chief Petty Officer of the Royal Canadian Navy		Chief Petty Officer 1st Class; Pascal Harel MMM, CD	May 2024	Royal Canadian Navy	
	Canadian Army Sergeant-Major		Chief Warrant Officer; J.C. Robin MMM, CD	12 July 2024	Canadian Army	
	Chief Warrant Officer of the Air Force		Chief Warrant Officer; W. J. Hall MMM, CD	10 June 2021	Royal Canadian Air Force	
Senior enlisted advisors Commands
	Canadian Forces Intelligence Command Chief Warrant Officer		Chief Warrant Officer; N.E. Belanger MMM, CD	2019	Royal Canadian Air Force	

== NATO ==
NATO also has a number of Senior Enlisted Advisors taken from NATO members for various posts, including Senior Enlisted Advisor - NATO Allied Command Transformation

== New Zealand ==
In New Zealand the equivalent positions within the Royal New Zealand Navy (RNZN), New Zealand Army and Royal New Zealand Air Force (RNZAF) are Warrant officer of the Navy (New Zealand) (WON), Sergeant Major of the Army (SMA) and Warrant Officer of the Air Force (WOAF) respectively. there is also the Senior position within HQNZDF of the Warrant Officer of the Defence Force (WODF) WODR

Service senior enlisted advisors
Rank insignia	Position	Photo	Incumbent	Service branch	Start date
	Warrant Officer of the Defence Force (New Zealand)		Warrant Officer class 1 Wiremu Moffitt	New Zealand Army	May 22, 2024
	Warrant officer of the Navy (New Zealand)		Warrant Officer Diver; Lance Graham	Royal New Zealand Navy	January 29, 2021
	Sergeant Major of the Army (New Zealand)		Warrant Officer class 1	New Zealand Army	-
	Warrant Officer of the Air Force (New Zealand)		Warrant Officer; Kerry Williams	Royal New Zealand Air Force	

== Singapore ==
Singapore has a Singapore Armed Forces (SAF) Sergeant Major (SAFSM), as well as Sergeant Major of the Army (SMA), Master Chief Navy (MCN), Air Force Command Chief (AFCC) and Chief Expert, Digital and Intelligence Service (CXDI).

Service senior enlisted advisors
Rank insignia	Position	Photo	Incumbent	Service branch	Start date
	SAF Sergeant Major		Chief Warrant Officer; Chua Hock Guan	Singapore Army	March 30, 2022
	Sergeant Major of the Army		Chief Warrant Officer; Sanjee Singh s/o Saraina	Singapore Army	May 5, 2023
	Master Chief Navy		Senior Warrant Officer; Seck Wai Kong	Republic of Singapore Navy	August 1, 2025
	Air Force Command Chief		Military Expert 6 Ng See Lye	Republic of Singapore Air Force	May 25, 2021
	Chief Expert, Digital and Intelligence Service		Military Expert 6 Noh Kok Tiong	Digital and Intelligence Service	October 28, 2022

== South Africa ==
South Africa has a Warrant officer of the Defence Force, as well as Sergeant Majors of the Army, Air Force and Medical Services. The Navy equivalent is the Master at Arms of the Navy

Service senior enlisted advisors
Rank insignia	Position	Photo	Incumbent	Service branch	Start date	Reference
	Warrant Officer of the South African National Defence Force		Master Chief Warrant Officer; Mothusi Kgaladi	South African Army	October 2012	
	Master at Arms of the Navy		Senior Chief Warrant Officer; Matee Molefe	South African Navy	February 1, 2018	
	Sergeant Major of the Army (South Africa)		Senior Chief Warrant Officer; Ncedakele Mtshatsheni	South African Army	February 1, 2017 (Acting from October 1, 2016 to January 31, 2017)	
	Sergeant Major of the Air Force		Senior Chief Warrant Officer; Colin Stanton-Jones	South African Air Force	December 1, 2018	
	Warrant Officer of the South African Military Health Services		Senior Chief Warrant Officer	South African Military Health Service		

== United Kingdom ==
The Royal Navy has the Warrant Officer to the Royal Navy, the British Army has the Army Sergeant Major, the Royal Air Force has the Chief of the Air Staff's Warrant Officer and the Royal Marines the Corps Regimental Sergeant Major. In 2018, the Senior Enlisted Advisor to the Chiefs of Staff Committee was introduced.

Service senior enlisted advisors
Rank insignia	Position	Photo	Incumbent	Service branch	Start date
	Senior Enlisted Advisor to the Chiefs of Staff Committee		Warrant Officer Class One; Sarah Cox	British Army	2025
	Warrant Officer of the Royal Navy (Note: Formerly called Warrant Officer of the Naval Service)		Warrant Officer Class One; Jamie Wright	Royal Marines	July 2022
	Army Sergeant Major		Warrant Officer Class One; John Miller	British Army	April 2025
	Warrant Officer of the Royal Air Force (Note: Formerly called Chief of the Air Staff's Warrant Officer)		Warrant Officer; Murugesvaran Subramaniam	Royal Air Force	April 2023
	Corps Regimental Sergeant Major		Warrant Officer Class One; Tim Jukes	Royal Marines	June 2024

== United States ==
In the United States Armed Forces E-9 billets for the senior enlisted advisor are established at service unit (e.g., battalion, wing, or higher), command, major command, force, or fleet levels to the SEAs/CSELs of DoD Agencies and the Senior Enlisted Advisor to the Chairman of the Joint Chiefs of Staff. SEAs are also known as command senior enlisted leaders (CSEL). Always a non-commissioned officer, the SEA is the main link between the commanding officer and the enlisted service members under his or her charge.

Service senior enlisted advisors
Position insignia	Position	Photo	Incumbent	Service branch	Start date
Senior Enlisted Advisor to the Chairman	Senior Enlisted Advisor to the Chairman		SEAC; David L. Isom	U.S. Navy	June 20, 2025
Sergeant Major of the Army	Sergeant Major of the Army		SMA; Michael R. Weimer	U.S. Army	August 4, 2023
	Sergeant Major of the Marine Corps		SMMC; Carlos A. Ruiz	U.S. Marine Corps	August 10, 2023
	Master Chief Petty Officer of the Navy		MCPON; John J. Perryman IV	U.S. Navy	September 8, 2025
Chief Master Sergeant of the Air Force	Chief Master Sergeant of the Air Force		CMSAF; David R. Wolfe	U.S. Air Force	December 8, 2025
Chief Master Sergeant of the Space Force	Chief Master Sergeant of the Space Force		CMSSF; John F. Bentivegna	U.S. Space Force	September 15, 2023
Master Chief Petty Officer of the Coast Guard	Master Chief Petty Officer of the Coast Guard		MCPOCG; Phillip N. Waldron	U.S. Coast Guard	July 25, 2025
Senior Enlisted Advisor to the Chief of the National Guard Bureau	Senior Enlisted Advisor to the Chief of the National Guard Bureau		SEA; John T. Raines III	U.S. Army	November 8, 2024
Senior enlisted advisors, Unified Combatant Commands
U.S. Africa Command	United States Africa Command		CSM; Garric M. Banfield	U.S. Army	November 20, 2025
U.S. Central Command	United States Central Command		FLTCM; Lateef N. Compton	U.S. Navy	September 2025
U.S. Cyber Command	United States Cyber Command		CMSgt; Kenneth M. Bruce Jr.	U.S. Air Force	September 8, 2023
U.S. European Command	United States European Command		CSM; Thomas J. Holland	U.S. Army	June 17, 2025
U.S. Indo-Pacific Command	United States Indo-Pacific Command		SgtMaj; Eric D. Cook	U.S. Marine Corps	June 26, 2025
U.S. Northern Command	United States Northern Command		CMSgt; John G. Storms	U.S. Air Force	June 14, 2024
U.S. Southern Command	United States Southern Command		SgtMaj; Rafael Rodriguez	U.S. Marine Corps	September 6, 2023
U.S. Space Command	United States Space Command		CMSgt; Jacob C. Simmons	U.S. Space Force	August 7, 2023
U.S. Special Operations Command	United States Special Operations Command		CSM; Andrew J. Krogman	U.S. Army	September 6, 2025
U.S. Strategic Command	United States Strategic Command		CSM; JoAnn Naumann	U.S. Army	December 5, 2025
U.S. Transportation Command	United States Transportation Command		CMSgt; Brian P. Kruzelnick	U.S. Air Force	June 7, 2023

In the United States Army, the SEA for a battalion or larger-sized unit is usually a Command Sergeant Major. For Marine battalions and larger, a sergeant major typically takes the role. Navy ships and other commands will usually have a command, fleet, or force master chief petty officer (known as the Chief of the Boat on a submarine), while an Air Force or Space Force command chief master sergeant serves at Wing, Delta, Numbered Air Force, Field Operating Agency (FOA), Major Command, Field Command or at "Joint," DoD Agency levels.

In the United States Army and the United States Marine Corps, the senior enlisted advisor at the company or battery level (or other unit at similar echelon) is a first sergeant. In the Air Force and Space Force, the senior enlisted member of units smaller than those listed above for command chief master sergeant is either a chief master sergeant or a senior master sergeant and may also include a separate first sergeant authorization. In the Air Force a first sergeant can be an E7, E8 or E9, depending on size and mission of the unit, and is a temporary, special duty assignment.

== See also ==
- Praefectus castrorum
