= Comparative military ranks of apartheid states in southern Africa =

Rank comparison charts of armies/land forces of apartheid states and territories in Southern Africa.

This chart includes the military rank insignia of the nominally independent Bantustans, (Note: Transkei was granted "independence" by the Status of Transkei Act 100 of 1976 with effect from 26 October 1976.; Bophuthatswana was granted "independence" by the Status of Bophuthatswana Act 89 of 1977 with effect from 6 December 1977.; Venda was granted "independence" by the Status of Venda Act 107 of 1979 with effect from 13 September 1979.; Ciskei was granted "independence" by the Status of Ciskei Act 110 of 1981 granted with effect from 4 December 1981.) apartheid South Africa, and South West Africa. These states were all under the control of the apartheid regime of South Africa, with the defence forces of the Bantustans being made of units that were nominally independent of the SADF, but were selected and trained by the SADF, and who placed former South African and Rhodesian military officers in senior positions within the defence forces. The South West Africa Territorial Force was an auxiliary arm of the SADF and formed the armed forces of South West Africa from 1977 to 1989.

== Armies ==
Officers

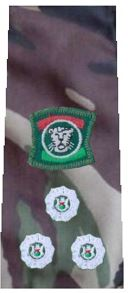
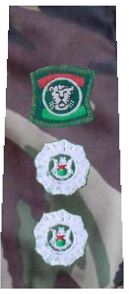
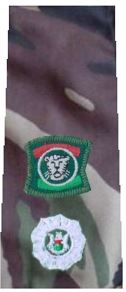
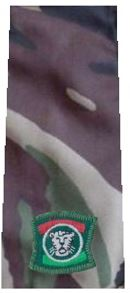
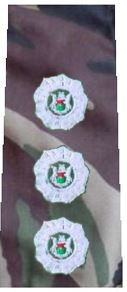
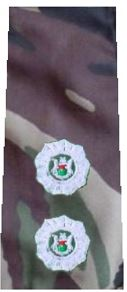
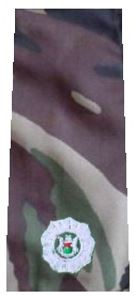
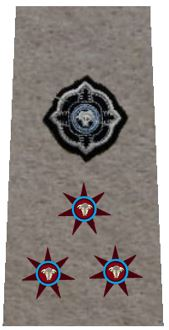
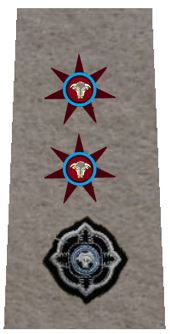
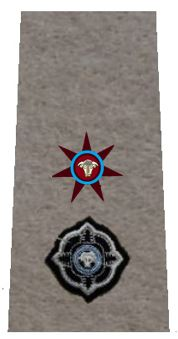
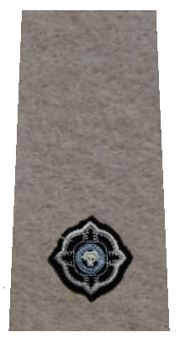
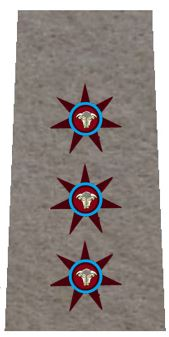
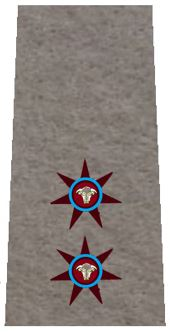
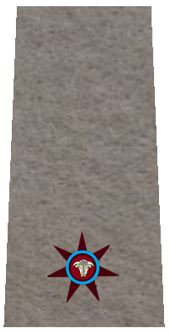
Rank group	General / flag officers				Senior officers				Junior officers
Bophuthatswana Army
Bophuthatswana Army			Major general	Brigadier	Colonel	Commandant		Major	Captain	Lieutenant	Second lieutenant
Bophuthatswana Army			Generaal-majoor	Brigadier	Kolonel	Kommandant		Majoor	Kaptein	Luitenant	Tweede luitenant
Ciskei Army
Ciskei Army		Lieutenant general		Brigadier	Colonel	Lieutenant colonel		Major	Captain	Lieutenant	Second lieutenant
South African Army (1961–1994)
South African Army (1961–1994)	General (Note: Called commandant general (kommandant-general) from 1956 to 1968.)	Lieutenant general	Major general (Note: Called combat general (bestry general) from 1960 to 1968.)	Brigadier	Colonel	Chief commandant (Note: Only in the commandos from 1967 to 1970.)	Commandant	Major	Captain	Lieutenant (Note: Called field cornet (veldkornet) from 1960 to 1968.)	Second lieutenant (Note: Called assistant field cornet (assistent veldkornet) from 1960 to 1968.)
South African Army (1961–1994)	General	Luitenant-general	General-major	Brigadier	Colonel	Hoofkommandant	Major	Captein	Luitenant		Second luitenant
South West African Army
South West African Army		Lieutenant general	Major general	Brigadier	Colonel	Lieutenant colonel		Major	Captain	Lieutenant	Second lieutenant
Transkei Army
Transkei Army	General	Lieutenant general	Major general	Brigadier	Colonel	Lieutenant colonel		Major	Captain	Lieutenant	Second lieutenant
Venda Ground Forces
Venda Ground Forces				Brigadier	Colonel	Lieutenant colonel		Major	Captain	Lieutenant	Second lieutenant
Rank group	General / flag officers				Senior officers				Junior officers

Student officer ranks

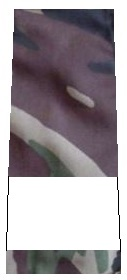
Rank group	Student officer
Bophuthatswana Army
Bophuthatswana Army	Officer candidate Kandidaat offisier
South African Army (1961–1994)
South African Army (1961–1994)	Officer candidate Kandidaat offisier
South West African Army
South West African Army	Officer candidate

Other ranks

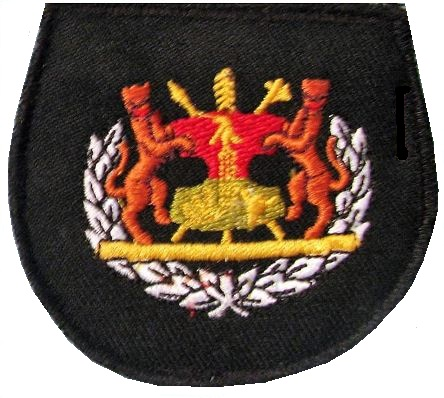
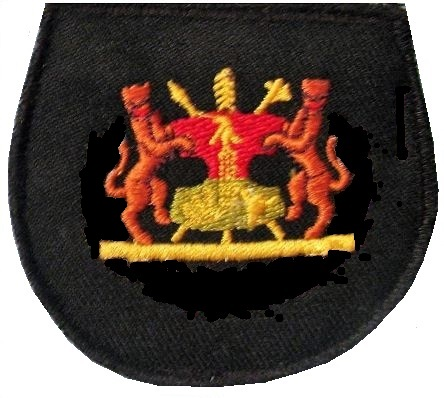
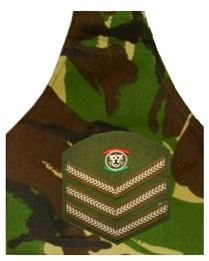
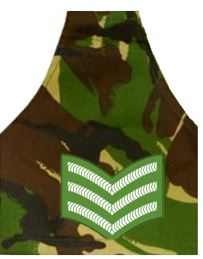
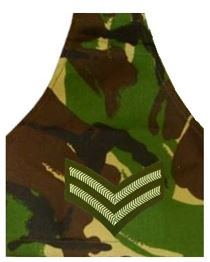
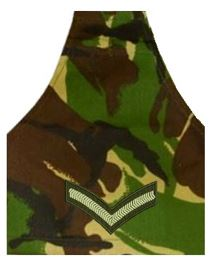
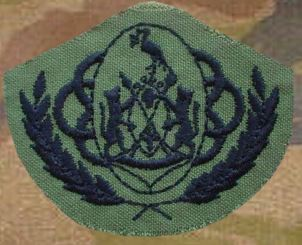
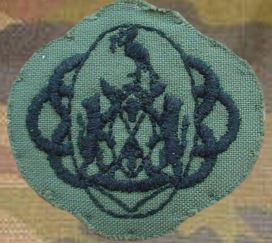
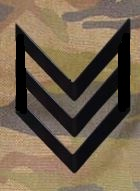
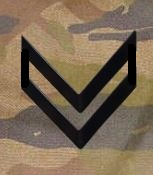
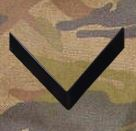
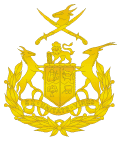
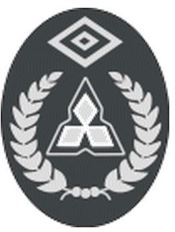
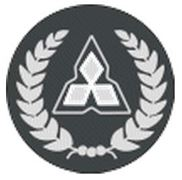
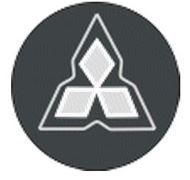
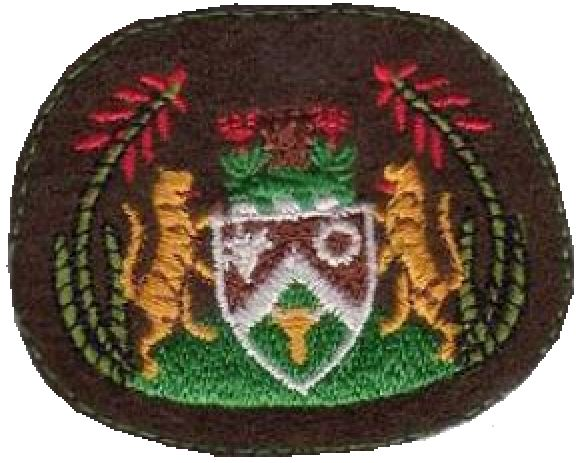
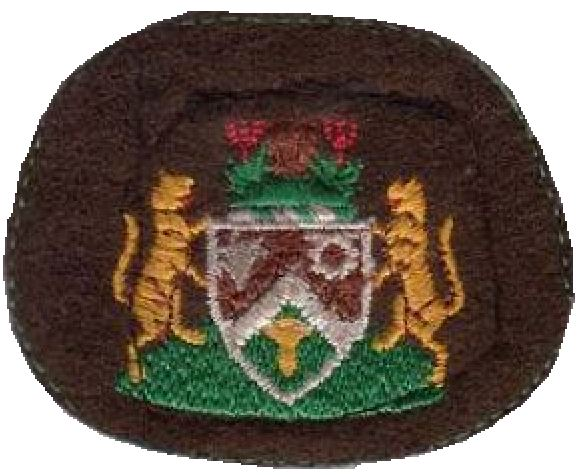
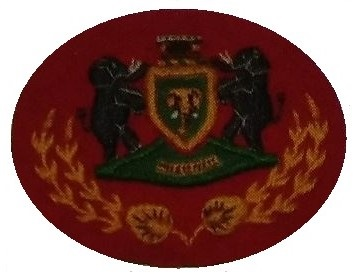
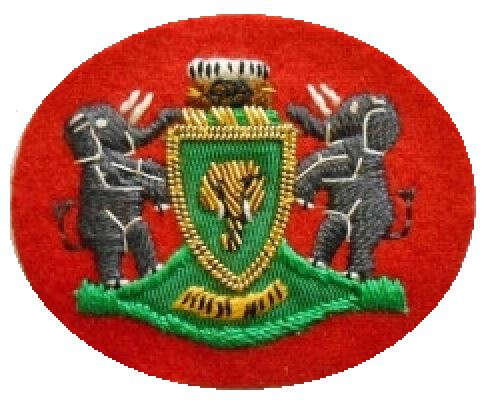
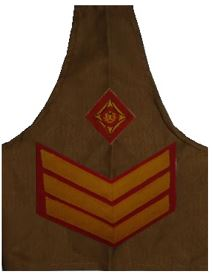
Rank group	Senior NCOs					Junior NCOs		Enlisted
Bophuthatswana Army								No insignia
Bophuthatswana Army	Warrant officer class 1		Warrant officer class 2	Staff sergeant	Sergeant	Corporal	Lance corporal	Private
Bophuthatswana Army	Adjudant-Offisier Klass I		Adjudant-Offisier Klass II	Staf-Sersant	Sersant	Korporaal	Onderkorporaal	Soldaat
Ciskei Army								No insignia
Ciskei Army	Chief warrant officer		Warrant officer	Staff sergeant	Sergeant	Corporal	Lance corporal	Private
South African Army (1961–1994)								No insignia
South African Army (1961–1994)	Sergeant Major of the Army; Sersant-Majoor van die Leër	Warrant officer class 1 Adjudant-Offisier Klas I	Warrant officer class 2 Adjudant-Offisier Klas II	Staff sergeant Stafsersant	Sergeant; Sersant	Corporal; Korporaal	Lance corporal Onderkorporaal	Private; Soldaat
South West African Army								No insignia
South West African Army	Formation warrant officer	Warrant officer class 1	Warrant officer class 2	Staff sergeant	Sergeant	Corporal	Lance corporal	Private
Transkei Army								No insignia
Transkei Army	Chief warrant officer		Warrant officer	Staff sergeant	Sergeant	Corporal	Lance corporal	Private
Venda Ground Forces								No insignia
Venda Ground Forces	Chief warrant officer		Warrant officer	Staff sergeant	Sergeant	Corporal	Lance corporal	Private
Rank group	Senior NCOs					Junior NCOs		Enlisted

== Air forces ==
Officers

Rank group	General / flag officers				Senior officers			Junior officers
Bophuthatswana Air Force
Bophuthatswana Air Force				Brigadier	Colonel	Commandant	Major	Captain	Lieutenant	Second lieutenant
Bophuthatswana Air Force				Brigadier	Kolonel	Kommandant	Majoor	Kaptein	Luitenant	Tweede luitenant
South African Air Force (1961–1994)
South African Air Force (1961–1994)	General	Lieutenant general	Major general	Brigadier	Colonel	Commandant	Major	Captain	Lieutenant	Second lieutenant
South African Air Force (1961–1994)	Generaal	Luitenant-generaal	Generaal-majoor	Brigadier	Kolonel	Kommandant	Majoor	Kaptein	Luitenant	Tweede luitenant
Rank group	General / flag officers				Senior officers			Junior officers

Other ranks

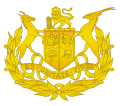
Rank group	Senior NCOs					Junior NCOs		Enlisted
Bophuthatswana Air Force								No insignia
Bophuthatswana Air Force	Sergeant Major of the Air Force	Warrant officer class 1	Warrant officer class 2	Staff sergeant	Sergeant	Corporal	Lance corporal	Private
Bophuthatswana Air Force	Sersant-Majoor van die Lugmag	Adjudant-Offisier Klass I	Adjudant-Offisier Klass II	Staf-Sersant	Sersant	Korporaal	Onderkorporaal	Soldaat
South African Air Force (1961–1994)								No insignia
South African Air Force (1961–1994)	Sergeant Major of the Air Force	Warrant officer class 1	Warrant officer class 2	Flight sergeant	Sergeant (Note: Called air sergeant (lugsersant) from 1960 to 1968.)	Corporal (Note: Called air sorporal (lugkorporaal) from 1960 to 1968.)	Lance corporal (Note: Called leading air mechanic (leiend lugwerktuigkundige) until 1970.)	Aircraftman (Note: Called air mechanic (lugwerktuigkundige) from 1920 to 1970. Called private (soldaat) from 1970 to 1982.)
South African Air Force (1961–1994)	Sersant-Majoor van die SA Lugmag	Adjudant-offisier klas I	Adjudant-offisier klas II	Vlugsersant	Sersant	Korporaal	Onderkorporaal	Vliegtuigman
Rank group	Senior NCOs					Junior NCOs		Enlisted

== See also ==
- South African military ranks
- Military ranks of Namibia
- Military ranks of Zimbabwe
- Military ranks of Rhodesia
