= Ranks and insignia of the South African National Defence Force =

The South African National Defence Force's rank system is largely based on the British system, with the Air Force (and later the Military Health Service) sharing the Army rank titles.

== Current ranks ==
=== Commissioned officer ranks ===
The rank insignia of commissioned officers.

Rank group	General / flag officers				Senior officers			Junior officers
South African Army
South African Army	General	Lieutenant general	Major general	Brigadier general	Colonel	Lieutenant colonel	Major	Captain	Lieutenant	Second lieutenant
South African Navy
South African Navy	Admiral	Vice admiral	Rear admiral	Rear admiral (junior grade)	Captain	Commander	Lieutenant commander	Lieutenant	Sub lieutenant	Ensign
South African Air Force
South African Air Force	General	Lieutenant general	Major general	Brigadier general	Colonel	Lieutenant colonel	Major	Captain	Lieutenant	Second lieutenant
South African; Military Health Service
South African; Military Health Service	General	Lieutenant general	Major general	Brigadier general	Colonel	Lieutenant colonel	Major	Captain	Lieutenant	Second lieutenant
Rank group	General / flag officers				Senior officers			Junior officers

==== Student officer ranks ====
Rank group	Student officer
South African Army
South African Army	Officer candidate
South African Navy
South African Navy	Midshipman
South African Air Force
South African Air Force	Officer candidate

=== Warrant officers ===
Rank group	Warrant officers
South African National Defence Force
South African National Defence Force	Master chief warrant officer	Senior chief warrant officer	Chief warrant officer	Master warrant officer	Senior warrant officer

==== Senior warrant officer ranks ====
In June 2008 a new series of warrant officer ranks were introduced.

The highest ranking South African non-commissioned officer is the Warrant Officer of the South African National Defence Force. They are the sole holder of the rank of Master Chief Warrant Officer. As of October 2012 the incumbent MCWO is Mothusi Kgaladi

The rank of Senior Chief Warrant Officer is only held by the Master at Arms of the Navy, the Sergeant Major of the Army, the Sergeant Major of the Air Force, and the Sergeant Major of the Military Health Service.

=== Other ranks ===
The rank insignia of non-commissioned officers and enlisted personnel.

Rank group	Senior NCOs				Junior NCOs		Enlisted
South African Army							No insignia
South African Army	Warrant officer class 1	Warrant officer class 2	Staff sergeant	Sergeant	Corporal	Lance corporal	Private (or equivalent)
South African Navy
South African Navy	Warrant officer class 1	Warrant officer class 2	Chief petty officer	Petty officer	Leading seaman		Able seaman	Seaman
South African Air Force								No insignia
South African Air Force	Warrant officer class 1	Warrant officer class 2	Flight sergeant	Sergeant	Corporal	Lance corporal		Airman
South African; Military Health Service							No insignia
South African; Military Health Service	Warrant officer class 1	Warrant officer class 2	Staff sergeant	Sergeant	Corporal	Lance corporal	Private (or equivalent)
Rank group	Senior NCOs				Junior NCOs		Enlisted

== Historical army ranks ==
A list of every combat SADF rank insignia from 1961-1994, it includes the Army, Airforce and Navy

The SA Army was formed in 1912 as the Union Defence Force. It was given its present name in 1951. The rank system is derived from that of the British Army.

The ranks of General Officers changed in September 2003 when the rank previously called Brigadier became known as Brigadier General.

=== Officers ===
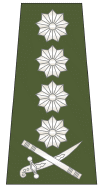
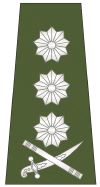
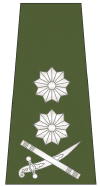
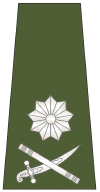
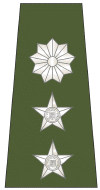
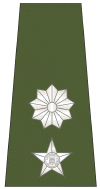
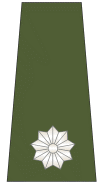
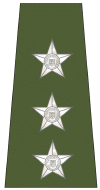
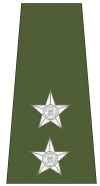
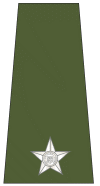
Rank group	General / flag officers					Senior officers				Junior officers
Union of South Africa Army (1928–1953)
Union of South Africa Army (1928–1953)	Field marshal	General	Lieutenant general	Major general	Brigadier (Note: Called colonel-commandant 1937–1940)	Colonel	Lieutenant colonel		Major	Captain	Lieutenant	Second lieutenant
Union of South Africa Army (1928–1953)	Veldmaarskalk	Generaal	Luitenant-generaal	Generaal-majoor	Brigadier	Kolonel	Luitenant-kolonel		Majoor	Kaptein	Luitenant	Tweede luitenant
South African Army (1961–1994)
South African Army (1961–1994)		General (Note: Called commandant general (kommandant-general) from 1956 to 1968.)	Lieutenant general	Major general (Note: Called combat general (bestry general) from 1960 to 1968.)	Brigadier	Colonel	Chief commandant (Note: Only in the commandos from 1967 to 1970.)	Commandant	Major	Captain	Lieutenant (Note: Called field cornet (veldkornet) from 1960 to 1968.)	Second lieutenant (Note: Called assistant field cornet (assistent veldkornet) from 1960 to 1968.)
South African Army (1961–1994)		General	Luitenant-general	General-major	Brigadier	Colonel	Hoofkommandant	Major	Captein	Luitenant		Second luitenant
South African Army (1994–2002)
South African Army (1994–2002)		General; Generaal	Lieutenant General; Luitenant-Generaal	Major General; Generaal-Majoor	Brigadier; Brigadier	Colonel; Kolonel	Commandant; Kommandant		Major; Majoor	Captain; Kaptein	Lieutenant; Luitenant	Second Lieutenant; Tweede Luitenant

=== Other ranks ===
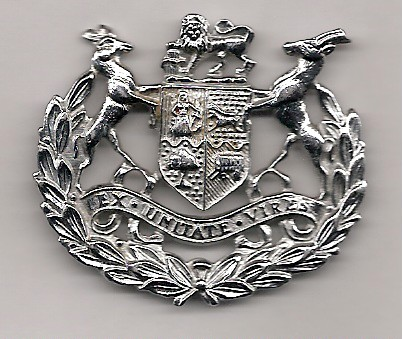
Warrant officer class 1 rank badge 1951–2002

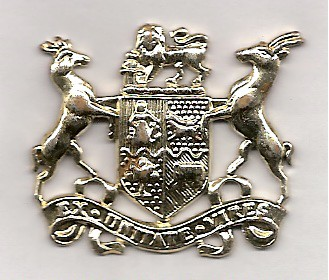
Warrant officer class 2 rank badge 1951–2002

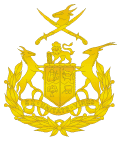
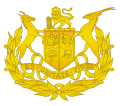
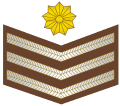
Rank group	Senior NCOs					Junior NCOs		Enlisted
Union of South Africa Army (1928–1953)								No insignia
Union of South Africa Army (1928–1953)	Warrant officer class 1 Adjudant-Offisier Klas I		Warrant officer class 2 Adjudant-Offisier Klas II	Staff sergeant Stafsersant	Sergeant; Sersant	Corporal; Korporaal	Lance corporal Onderkorporaal	Private; Soldaat
South African Army (1961–1994)								No insignia
South African Army (1961–1994)	Sergeant Major of the Army; Sersant-Majoor van die Leër	Warrant officer class 1 Adjudant-Offisier Klas I	Warrant officer class 2 Adjudant-Offisier Klas II	Staff sergeant Stafsersant	Sergeant; Sersant	Corporal; Korporaal	Lance corporal Onderkorporaal	Private; Soldaat
South African Army (1994–2002)								No insignia
South African Army (1994–2002)	Warrant officer class 1 Adjudant-Offisier Klas I		Warrant officer class 2 Adjudant-Offisier Klas II	Staff sergeant Stafsersant	Sergeant; Sersant	Corporal; Korporaal	Lance corporal Onderkorporaal	Private (or equivalent)

Note: in the artillery and anti-aircraft corps, the corporal and lance-corporal are called "bombardier" (bombardeer) and "lance-bombardier" (onderbombardeer). The private is called a "gunner" in the artillery and anti-aircraft, a "rifleman" in the infantry, a "trooper" in the armoured corps, a "sapper" in the engineers, a "signalman" in the signals corps, and a "scout" in the intelligence corps.

==== Substantive warrant officer posts ====
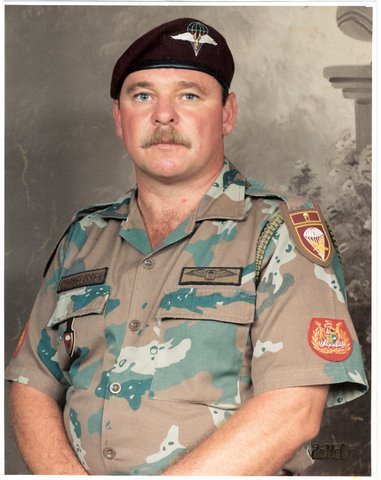
A WO1 wearing RSM insignia

Any warrant officer class 1 could be posted to substantive posts, including

- Regimental sergeant major
- Command sergeant major
- Brigade sergeant major
- Sergeant Major of the Army
- Sergeant Major of the Air Force

However they would retain the rank of WO1, while wearing unique rank insignia. To distinguish the posting different colour backgrounds were used; for example, red for regimental sergeant major and black for command sergeant major. The sergeant major of each arm of service wore insignia topped by the arms of their respective arm of service.

In 2008 the warrant officer ranks were expanded to make each substantive rank a formal rank.

== Historical air force ranks ==
The SA Air Force was formed in 1920. Unlike many other Commonwealth air forces, it had an army style rank system. In 2002 the Air Force officer rank insignia structure was changed from one which was shared with the Army to a new pattern based on stripes. The Air Force stated that this was "in order to bring it more in line with international forms of rank". The army-style rank titles were retained. Note: The rank of General is only used when the Chief of the Air Force is also the Chief of the Defence Force which has occurred on occasion in the past. In 2005 the South African Air Force redesigned its insignia completely, while keeping the Army titles.

=== Officers ===
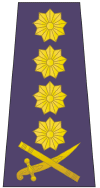
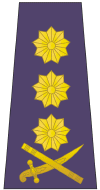
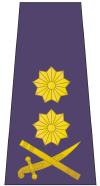
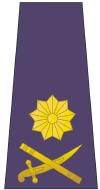
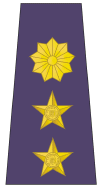
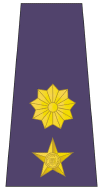
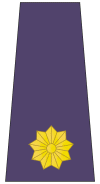
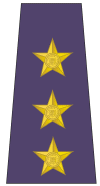
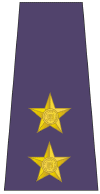
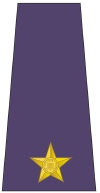
Rank group	General/Flag/Air officers				Senior officers			Junior officers
South African Air Force (1961–1994)
South African Air Force (1961–1994)	General	Lieutenant general	Major general	Brigadier	Colonel	Commandant	Major	Captain	Lieutenant	Second lieutenant
South African Air Force (1961–1994)	Generaal	Luitenant-generaal	Generaal-majoor	Brigadier	Kolonel	Kommandant	Majoor	Kaptein	Luitenant	Tweede luitenant
South African Air Force (1994–2002)
South African Air Force (1994–2002)	General	Lieutenant general	Major general	Brigadier	Colonel	Commandant	Major	Captain	Lieutenant	Second lieutenant
South African Air Force (1994–2002)	Generaal	Luitenant-generaal	Generaal-majoor	Brigadier	Kolonel	Kommandant	Majoor	Kaptein	Luitenant	Tweede luitenant

=== Other ranks ===
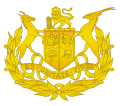
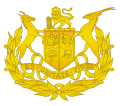
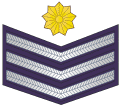
Rank group	Senior NCOs					Junior NCOs		Enlisted
South African Air Force (1961–1994)								No insignia
South African Air Force (1961–1994)	Sergeant Major of the Air Force	Warrant officer class 1	Warrant officer class 2	Flight sergeant	Sergeant (Note: Called air sergeant (lugsersant) from 1960 to 1968.)	Corporal (Note: Called air sorporal (lugkorporaal) from 1960 to 1968.)	Lance corporal (Note: Called leading air mechanic (leiend lugwerktuigkundige) until 1970.)	Aircraftman (Note: Called air mechanic (lugwerktuigkundige) from 1920 to 1970. Called private (soldaat) from 1970 to 1982.)
South African Air Force (1961–1994)	Sersant-Majoor van die SA Lugmag	Adjudant-offisier klas I	Adjudant-offisier klas II	Vlugsersant	Sersant	Korporaal	Onderkorporaal	Vliegtuigman
South African Air Force (1994–2002)								No insignia
South African Air Force (1994–2002)	Warrant officer class 1		Warrant officer class 2	Flight sergeant	Sergeant	Corporal	Lance corporal	Aircraftman
South African Air Force (1994–2002)	Adjudant-offisier klas I		Adjudant-offisier klas II	Vlugsersant	Sersant	Korporaal	Onderkorporaal	Vliegtuigman

== Historical navy ranks ==
The SA Navy was originally two separate organisations, namely the South African Division of the Royal Navy Volunteer Reserve (formed in 1913) and the South African Naval Service (formed in 1922 and renamed the "Seaward Defence Force" in 1939). They amalgamated in 1942 to form the SA Naval Forces, which were renamed "SA Navy" in 1951. The rank system is based on that of the (British) Royal Navy.

The ranks of flag officers changed in 1997 when the rank previously called Commodore became known as Rear Admiral (Junior Grade).

=== Officers ===
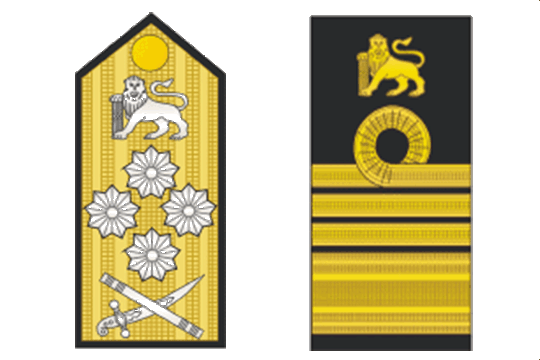
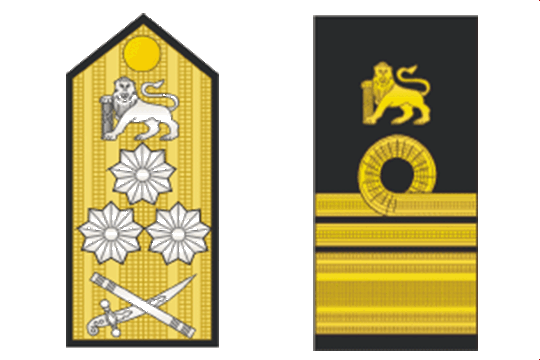
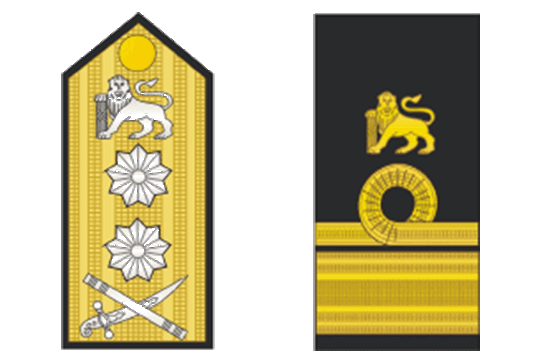
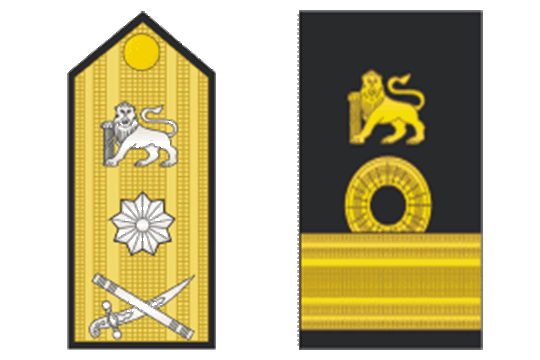
Rank group	General/flag officers				Senior officers			Junior officers
South African Navy (1961–1994)
South African Navy (1961–1994)	Admiral	Vice admiral	Rear admiral	Commodore	Captain	Commander	Lieutenant commander	Lieutenant	Sub-lieutenant	Ensign (Note: Called acting sub-lieutenant until 1965.)
South African Navy (1961–1994)	Admiraal	Vise-admiraal	Skoutadmiraal	Kommodoor	Kaptein	Kommandeur	Luitenant-kommandeur	Luitenant	Onderluitenant	Vaandrig
South African Navy (1994–2002)
South African Navy (1994–2002)	Admiral	Vice admiral	Rear admiral	Commodore	Captain	Commander	Lieutenant commander	Lieutenant	Sub-lieutenant	Ensign
South African Navy (1994–2002)	Admiraal	Vise-admiraal	Skoutadmiraal	Kommodoor	Kaptein	Kommandeur	Luitenant-kommandeur	Luitenant	Onderluitenant	Vaandrig

=== Enlisted ===
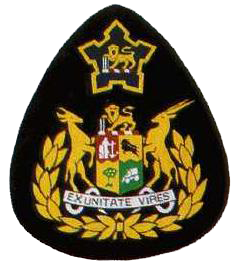
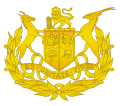
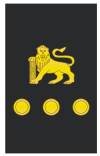
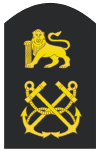
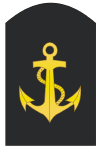
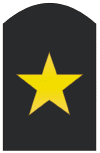
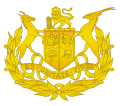
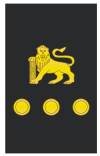
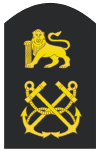
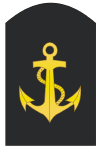
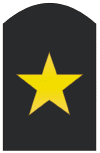
Rank group	Senior NCOs					Junior NCOs	Enlisted
South African Navy (1961–1994)
South African Navy (1961–1994)	Master at Arms of the Navy	Warrant officer class 1	Warrant officer class 2	Chief petty officer	Petty officer	Leading seaman	Able seaman
South African Navy (1961–1994)	Skeepsprovoos van die SA Vloot	Adjudant-offisier klas I	Adjudant-offisier klas II	Eerste bootsman	Bootsman	Baasseeman	Bevare seeman
South African Navy (1994–2002)
South African Navy (1994–2002)	Warrant officer class 1		Warrant officer class 2	Chief petty officer	Petty officer	Leading seaman	Able seaman
South African Navy (1994–2002)	Adjudant-offisier klas I		Adjudant-offisier klas II	Eerste bootsman	Bootsman	Baasseeman	Bevare seeman

== Historical health service ranks ==
=== Officers ===
Rank group	General / flag officers				Senior officers			Junior officers
South African Medical Service (1961–1994)
South African Medical Service (1961–1994)	General; Generaal	Lieutenant General; Luitenant-Generaal	Major General; Generaal-Majoor	Brigadier; Brigadier	Colonel; Kolonel	Commandant; Kommandant	Major; Majoor	Captain; Kaptein	Lieutenant; Luitenant	Second Lieutenant; Tweede Luitenant

== See also ==
- Comparative military ranks
- Comparative military ranks of apartheid states in southern Africa
- List of badges of the South African Army
- Military ranks of Zimbabwe
- Military ranks of Namibia
- Military ranks of Rhodesia
- South West Africa Territorial Force#Ranks
