= Holzberger =

Holzberger is a German language habitational surname. Notable people with the name include:

- Jordyn Holzberger (born 1993), Australian field hockey player
- Martin Holzberger (born 1968), officer of the Royal Australian Navy
