= Vigneault =

Vigneault is a surname most commonly found in Quebec, Canada, and may refer to one of the following people:

- Alain Vigneault (born 1961), Canadian ice hockey coach
- David Vigneault (appointed 2017), director of the Canadian Security Intelligence Service
- Gilles Vigneault (born 1928), Canadian poet and Quebec nationalist
- Guillaume Vigneault (born 1970), Canadian novelist, son of Gilles
- Michel Vigneault (sailor) (born 1967), Canadian naval officer
- Sonia Vigneault, Canadian actress
