= Michel Vigneault (sailor) =

CPO 1 Michel Vigneault
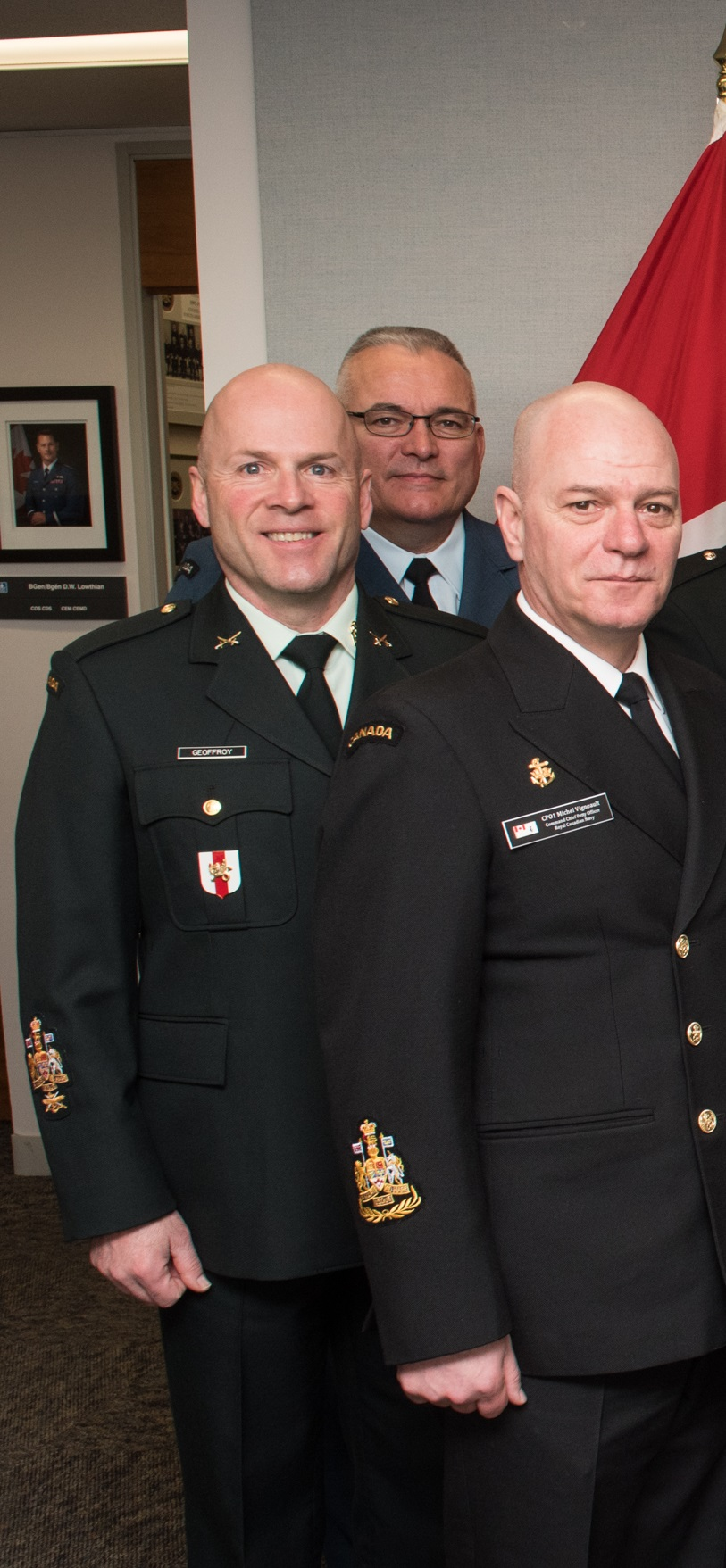
- Vigneault (foreground, right)
- Born: November 11th 1966; Îles de la Madeleine
- Military career
- Allegiance: Canada
- Branch: Royal Canadian Navy
- Service years: June 15th 1984 - July 2nd 2019
- Rank: Command Chief Petty Officer
- Commands: Chief Petty Officer of the Navy
- Awards: Order of Military Merit; Canadian Forces' Decoration

Chief Petty Officer First Class Michel Vigneault was a Royal Canadian Navy sailor, who served as the Royal Canadian Navy Command Chief Petty Officer, the most senior enlisted position in the Navy.

== Naval career ==
Vigneault joined the Navy at 17 years old in 1984 as a signalman. In July 1985, he joined his first ship, Her Majesty's Canadian Ship (HMCS) HMCS Huron (DDG 281), and subsequently served in HMCS Protecteur (AOR 509), HMCS Algonquin (DDG 283), HMCS Gatineau (DDE 236), HMCS Fredericton (FFH 337), HMCS Nipigon (DDH 266), HMCS Montréal (FFH 336) and HMCS St. John's (FFH 340), and at several shore establishments. Promoted to his current rank in 2009, CPO1 Vigneault was posted to Ottawa as the Career Manager for the naval communicators occupation. In 2010 he studied for a year at the Royal Military College of Canada as part of the Knowledge Acquisition Program, on completion of which he was appointed Coxswain of HMCS Montréal (FFH 336) in June 2011. In July 2013, Vigneault was appointed as Chief Petty Officer for the Pacific Fleet. He served as Pacific Fleet Chief Petty Officer until July 2016.

In August 2016, CPO1 Vigneault was appointed Royal Canadian Navy Command Chief Petty Officer. .

CPO1 Vigneault retired from the RCN after 35 years of dedicated service. In a formal change of command ceremony, on June 12, 2019, presided by Vadm Ron Lloyd (Former Commander of the Royal Canadian Navy), CPO1 Vigneault stepped down from the Command Chief position, and CPO1 David Steeves assumed his duties. CPO1 Steeves most recently served as Formation Chief for Maritime Forces Pacific. The ceremony was held at Her Majesty's Canadian Dockyard Halifax, home of Maritime Forces Atlantic.

== Awards and decorations ==
Vigneault's personal awards and decorations include the following:

Ribbon	Description	Notes
	Order of Military Merit (MMM)	Appointed Member (MMM) on 26 September 2013
	South-West Asia Service Medal	with AFGHANISTAN Clasp
	Special Service Medal	with NATO-OTAN Clasp
	Canadian Forces' Decoration (CD)	with two Clasps for 32 years of service
