= Master at Arms of the Navy =

Most senior Warrant Officer in the South African Navy

Master at Arms of the South African Navy
- Current Rank insignia
- Incumbent; Matee Molefe since 1 February 2018
- Style: Master at Arms of the Navy (Master)

Master at Arms of the Navy is the most senior Warrant Officer in the South African Navy (SAN). It is a singular appointment – it is only held by one person at any time. The Master at Arms of the Navy holds the rank of Senior Chief Warrant Officer

The Master at Arms of the Navy is responsible to the Chief of the Navy and is a member of his staff as well as the Navy Command Council. The Master is responsible for monitoring and improvement of discipline, morale, well-being of sailor and ensuring that the Navy maintains high professional standards.

== Rank and Insignia ==
=== Rank ===
Before 2008 all Masters at Arms SA Navy were Warrant Officer Class 1, with appointment to the position of Master at Arms SA Navy. In 2008 the SANDF expanded the Warrant Officer ranks and the Master at Arms SA Navy now holds the rank of Senior Chief Warrant Officer

=== Insignia ===
Prior to 2008 the Master at Arms of the Navy had a unique rank insignia, consisting of a Warrant Officer class 1 insignia with the South African Navy badge above it.

Insignia in the SADF (pre-1994)

After the Warrant Officer rank redesign the Master at Arms of the Navy does not have a unique rank insignia

== Previous Master at Arms of the Navy ==
Name	Start of term	End of term
WO1 Fraser	October 1982	1985
WO1 Eric William (Bill) Borchers	1985	1991
WO1 Terblanche	1991	1997
WO1 Eric Stroud	1997	2001
SCWO Mark Hyde	1 December 2001	30 May 2009
SCWO Pragasen Moodley	1 June 2009	31 Jan 2018
SCWO Matee Molefe	1 February 2018	current

Master at Arms of the Navy Mark Hyde (left) at the Freedom of Entry parade 2009

== See also ==
- South African Navy
- South African military ranks
