= Deb Butterworth =

Australian naval officer

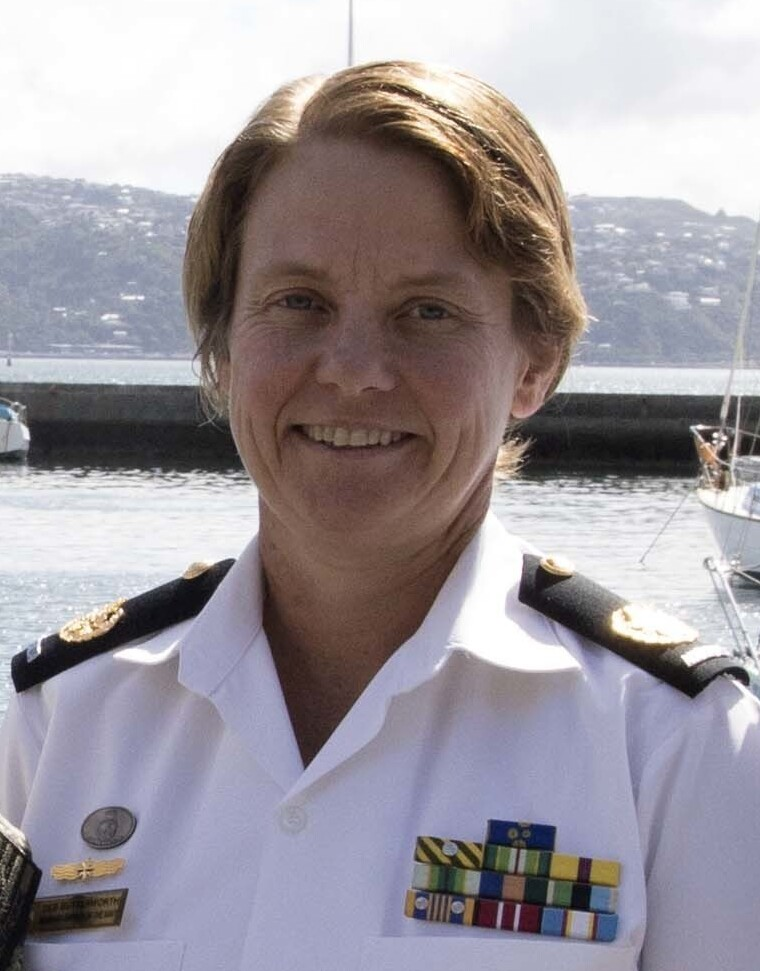
- Butterworth in 2020
- Born: Lilydale, Victoria
- Military career
- Allegiance: Australia
- Branch: Royal Australian Navy
- Service years: 1989–present
- Rank: Commander
- Commands: Warrant Officer of the Navy (2019–22)
- Conflicts: Iraq War; War in Afghanistan; Operation Okra
- Awards: Member of the Order of Australia; Conspicuous Service Medal & Bar

Debbie Ann Butterworth, AM, CSM & Bar is an officer in the Royal Australian Navy (RAN). She was Warrant Officer of the Navy, the most senior sailor of the RAN, from November 2019 to December 2022.

== Early life ==
Butterworth was born in Lilydale, Victoria, and for the first ten years of her life she travelled extensively. She then settled into school life in Perth, Western Australia.

== Navy career ==
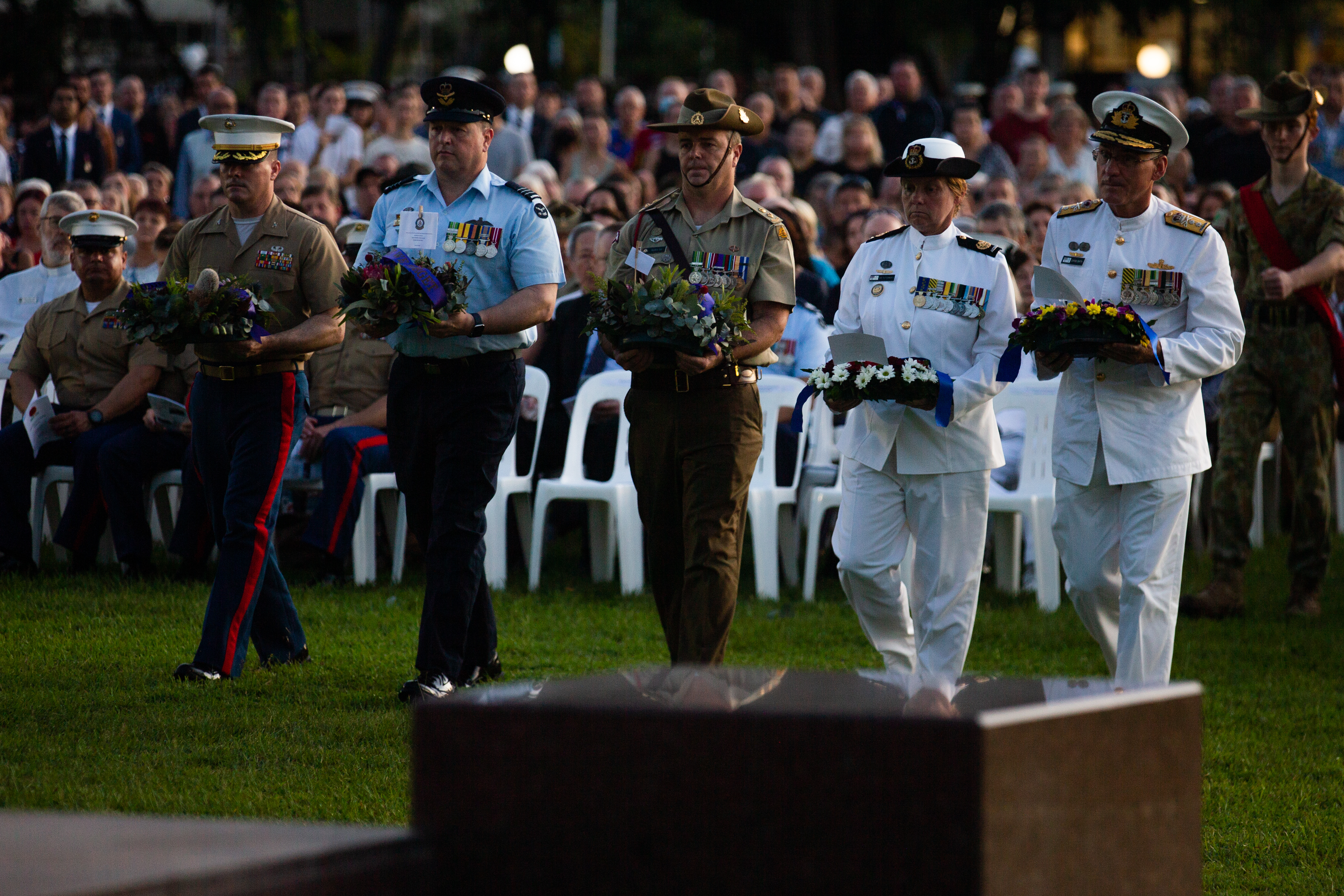
Butterworth (second from right) lays a wreath on Anzac Day, 2022

Butterworth enlisted into the Royal Australian Navy as a Stores Naval Sailor in 1989. Butterworth has enjoyed serving in various platforms as a Stores Sailor. These include HMA Ships Jervis Bay, Success, Sydney, Manoora, Newcastle, and a short time on Parramatta.

In 2003 and 2005, then Chief Petty Officer Butterworth deployed on HMAS Newcastle for Operation Catalyst, the Australian assistance to the reconstruction and rehabilitation of Iraq. Butterworth was awarded the Conspicuous Service Medal (CSM) in 2006 in recognition of her service on Newcastle.

Promoted to warrant officer in July 2007, Butterworth returned to Western Australia to take up the role of Logistic Services Manager in Joint Logistic Unit (West). In 2009, Butterworth joined Sea Training Group Major Fleet Units. The role of this group is to facilitate collective training and conduct unit-level assessment of RAN Fleet Units. Butterworth left logistics roles after being awarded a Medal of the Order of Australia for meritorious service to the Royal Australian Navy in the field of logistics management in 2012.

Butterworth assumed the role of the Ship's Warrant Officer on HMAS Success in December 2011. Success was an integral part of Operation Southern Indian Ocean, an activity to support the Australian Maritime Safety Authority to search for Malaysian Airlines Flight MH370 in April 2014. In 2014 Butterworth deployed to the Middle East and, upon return to Australia, she was awarded a Bar to her CSM in recognition of her service in Success.

In July 2017, Butterworth was appointed to the role of Command Warrant Officer Training Force. She served in the role until July 2019, when she was appointed to guide a team to create the Mariner Development Program to continue to develop mariners and warfighters while undertaking specialist employment training.

Butterworth was appointed as the Royal Australian Navy's ninth Warrant Officer of the Navy in November 2019. She served in the role for three years, handing over to Warrant Officer Andrew Bertoncin on 16 December 2022, and was then commissioned in the rank of commander. Butterworth was appointed a Member of the Order of Australia in the 2023 Australia Day Honours, the award recognising her "exceptional service ... in the field of Navy People leadership and management".

Butterworth holds a Master of Military and Defence Studies. When at home, Butterworth enjoys living in Canberra.

Military offices
Preceded by Gary Wight	Warrant Officer of the Navy; 2019–2022	Succeeded by Andrew Bertoncin
