= Senior Enlisted Advisor to the Chief of Defence Force =

Post in the Australian Defence Force

Senior Enlisted Advisor to the Chief of the Australian Defence Force
- Incumbent; Jae Robinson since 9 July 2026
- Style: Warrant Officer
- Formation: 1 July 2023
- First holder: Ken Robertson
- Website: SEAC

Senior Enlisted Advisor to the Chief of Defence Force (SEAC) is the senior warrant officer in the Australian Defence Force (ADF). It is a singular appointment, being it is only held by one person at any time. The current Senior Enlisted Advisor to the Chief of Defence Force is Warrant Officer Jae Robinson.

The role of the SEAC is to provide advice on culture, ethical leadership and professional military education.

The SEAC appointment is a Tier D warrant officer (E-10) and works collaboratively with the service-level warrant officers; Warrant Officer of the Navy (WO-N) in the Royal Australian Navy, Regimental Sergeant Major of the Army (RSM-A) in the Australian Army and Warrant Officer of the Air Force (WOFF-AF) in the Royal Australian Air Force

== List of officeholders ==
No.	Portrait	Name	Took office	Left office	Time in office	Defence branch	Ref.
1	Ken Robertson OAM	Warrant Officer; Ken Robertson OAM	1 July 2023	9 July 2026	3 years, 8 days	RAAF	
2	Jae Robinson OAM	Warrant Officer; Jae Robinson OAM	9 July 2026		60 days	Army	
