= Robert Swanwick =

Australian NCO

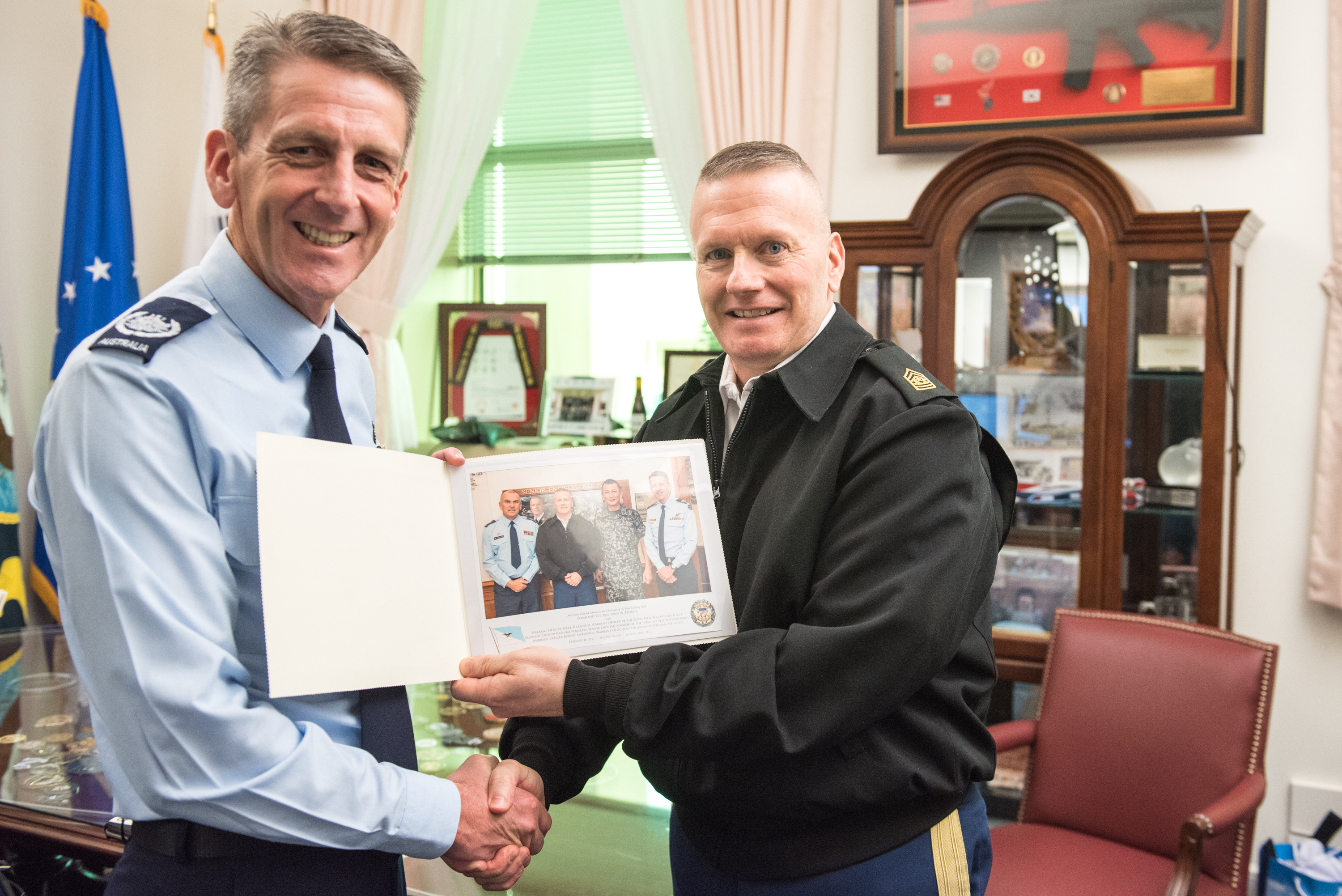
- Warrant Officer Robert Swanwick (left) with US Army Command Sergeant Major John W. Troxell in February 2017
- Military career
- Allegiance: Australia
- Branch: Royal Australian Air Force
- Service years: 1979–2019
- Rank: Warrant Officer
- Commands: Warrant Officer of the Air Force
- Conflicts: Multinational Force and Observers; Iraq War

Warrant Officer Robert Swanwick is a retired Royal Australian Air Force non-commissioned officer. He served as Warrant Officer of the Air Force from 1 December 2015 until 6 November 2019.

Military offices
Preceded by Mark Pentreath	Warrant Officer of the Air Force; 2015–2019	Succeeded by Fiona Grasby
