= Canadian Forces Chief Warrant Officer =

Senior enlisted member of the Canadian Armed Forces

Canadian Armed Forces Chief Warrant Officer
- Adjudant-chef des Forces armées canadiennes
- Insignia worn by the CAF CWO
- Incumbent; CWO Bob McCann since March 17, 2023
- Department of National Defence; Canadian Armed Forces
- Type: Senior enlisted advisor (SEA)
- Abbreviation: CAF CWO
- Reports to: Chief of the Defence Staff
- Formation: July 7, 1978
- First holder: Robert Osside
- Website: Official website

Canadian Armed Forces Chief Warrant Officer (CAF CWO; French: Adjudant-chef des Forces armées canadiennes) is the title of the senior non-commissioned member in the Canadian Armed Forces. The post was created in 1978 with the appointment of Chief Warrant Officer Robert Osside. The position is an appointment by the Chief of the Defence Staff (CDS) to assist in various duties and advise on all issues relating to non-commissioned members (NCMs). CWO Bob McCann has been the CAF CWO since March 17, 2023.

== Rank and insignia ==
The CAF CWO holds the substantive rank of chief warrant officer (if Army or Air Force) or chief petty officer 1st class (if Navy). Even if the incumbent is a Chief Petty Officer, the appointment title remains "Canadian Armed Forces Chief Warrant Officer".

The rank insignia of the CAF CWO is the coat of arms of Canada in coloured thread, surrounded by a wreath of 20 maple leaves in gold thread, worn on the lower sleeve of the service dress jacket. The cap badge is the coat of arms of Canada, in full-colour metallic thread.

== List of appointment holders ==
No.	Portrait	Name (birth–death)	Term of office			Defence environment	Ref.
No.	Portrait	Name (birth–death)	Took office	Left office	Time in office	Defence environment	Ref.
1		CWO; Robert Peter Angelo Osside OMM, CD (1930–2010)	July 7, 1978	July 5, 1982	3 years, 363 days	Army (Note: Officially, the Army was Force Mobile Command of the Canadian Forces until 2011.)	
2		CPO1; Fred Gilbert McKee OMM, CD (1935–2008)	July 5, 1982	July 13, 1984	2 years, 8 days	Navy (Note: Officially, the Navy was named Maritime Command until 2011.)	
3		CWO; Joseph Gilles Jules Turgeon MMM, CD	July 13, 1984	June 26, 1987	2 years, 348 days	Air Force (Note: Officially, the Air Force was named Air Command until 2011.)	
4		CWO; John Marr OMM, CD	June 26, 1987	July 22, 1991	4 years, 26 days		
5		CPO1; James D. Carroll OMM, CD (1940–1996)	July 22, 1991	July 25, 1995	4 years, 3 days	Navy	
6		CWO; Guy Parent MMM, CD	July 25, 1995	June 15, 1999	3 years, 325 days		
7		CWO; Joseph Jean Louis Maurice Dessureault OMM, CD	June 15, 1999	June 28, 2001	2 years, 43 days	Army	
8		CPO1; Richard Lupien MMM, CD	June 28, 2001	August 20, 2004	3 years, 23 days	Navy	
9		CWO; Daniel Gilbert MMM, CD	August 20, 2004	July 30, 2007	2 years, 344 days	Air Force	
10		CWO; Greg Lacroix MMM, CD	July 30, 2007	July 12, 2010	2 years, 347 days	Army	
11		CPO1; Robert Cléroux MMM, CD	July 12, 2010	July 5, 2013	2 years, 358 days	Navy (Note: Cléroux was serving as CF Chief Warrant Officer when Maritime Command was renamed the Royal Canadian Navy on 16 August 2011.)	
12		CWO; Kevin West MMM, MSM, CD	July 5, 2013	July 5, 2018	5 years, 0 days	Air Force	
13		CWO; Alain Guimond MMM, CD	July 5, 2018	September 3, 2020	2 years, 60 days	Army	
14		CPO1; Gilles Gregoire MMM, CD	September 3, 2020	April 14, 2023	2 years, 223 days	Navy	
15		CWO; Bob McCann OMM, MSM, CD	April 14, 2023	Incumbent	3 years, 146 days	Army	
