= Gary Wight =

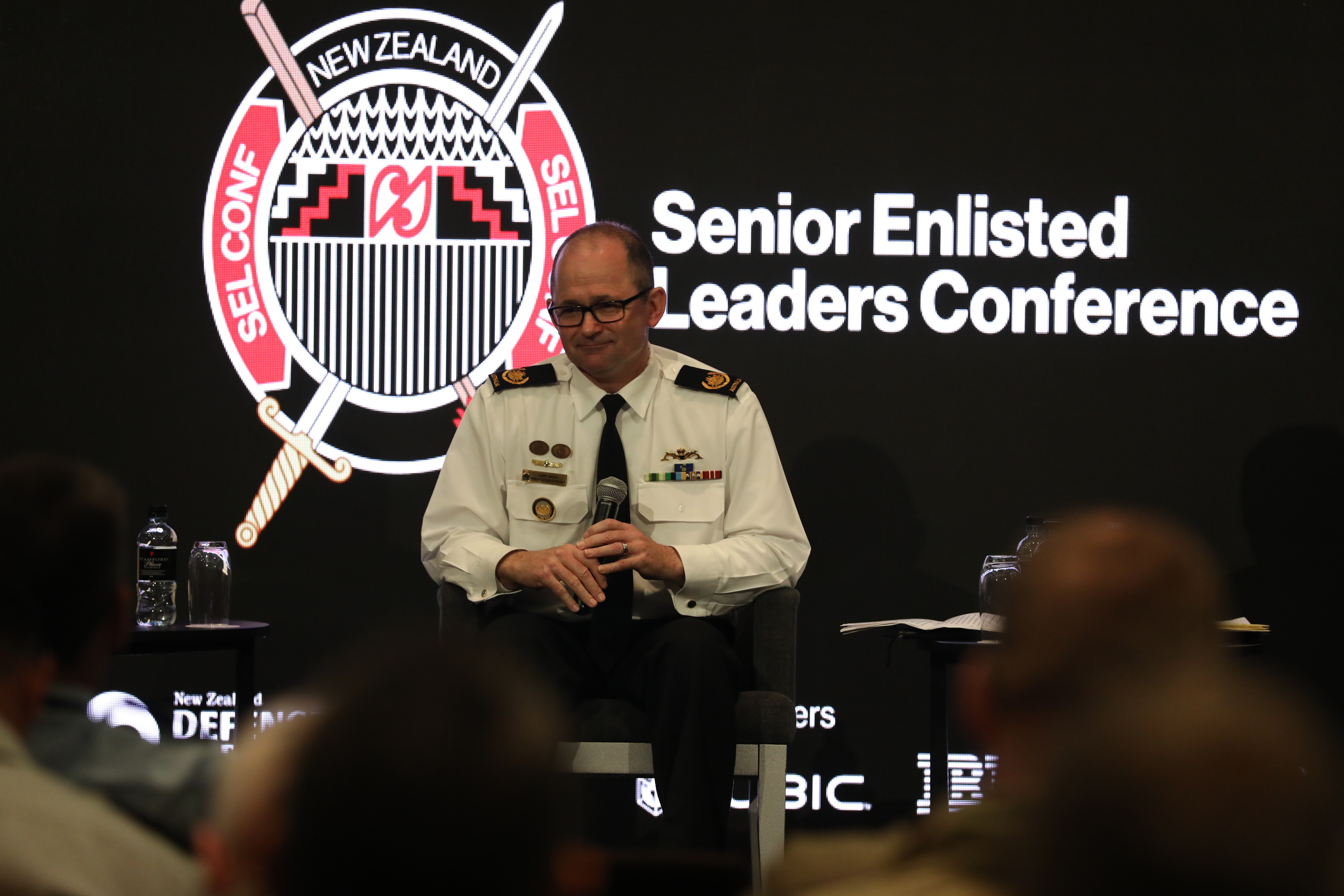
- Born: 21 September 1968 (age 58); Liverpool, New South Wales
- Military career
- Allegiance: Australia
- Branch: Royal Australian Navy
- Service years: 1987–present
- Rank: Commander
- Commands: Warrant Officer of the Navy
- Conflicts: Operation Okra
- Awards: Member of the Order of Australia

Gary William Wight, AM (born 21 September 1968) is an officer in the Royal Australian Navy (RAN). He joined the RAN as a submariner in 1987 and rose through the ranks to become the 8th Warrant Officer of the Navy in 2016. He relinquished the post in 2019 and was subsequently commissioned as an officer.

== Early life ==
Wight was born in Liverpool, New South Wales, on 21 September 1968. He joined the Royal Australian Navy (RAN) in January 1987, later completing submarine training.

== Naval career ==
As a chief petty officer, Wight served as Chief of the Boat of HMAS Sheean. He was promoted to warrant officer in 2006 and appointed Ships Warrant Officer of the frigate HMAS Darwin. In September 2012 he served as Command Warrant Officer of Career Management until he deployed on Operation Okra in June 2015 as the Command Warrant Officer of Joint Task Force 633.

Wight's operational service includes Special Operations Submarines, Operation Manitou and short deployments on Operation Okra and Operation Highroad. He became the 8th Warrant Officer of the Navy in 2016. He relinquished the post to Warrant Officer Deb Butterworth in November 2019, and was subsequently commissioned as an officer.

Wight was appointed a Member of the Order of Australia in the 2019 Queen's Birthday Honours in recognition of his "exceptional service to the Royal Australian Navy in the field of Navy People leadership and management." He has been also awarded two Fleet Commander's Commendations: first for his service as Communications Capability Staff Officer, Submarine Force HMAS Stirling; and second was for service as the ship's warrant officer of HMAS Darwin. He holds a Master of Business Management from the University of New South Wales, is married, has four children and resides in Canberra.

Military offices
Preceded by Martin Holzberger	Warrant Officer of the Navy; 2016–2019	Succeeded by Deb Butterworth
