= Fiona Grasby =

Australian airforce officer

Fiona Grasby OAM
- Military career
- Allegiance: Australia
- Branch: Royal Australian Air Force
- Service years: 1987–present
- Rank: Wing Commander
- Commands: Joint Military Police Force; Warrant Officer of the Air Force
- Conflicts: War in Afghanistan; Iraq War; Operation Okra
- Awards: Medal of the Order of Australia

Fiona Jane Grasby is a Royal Australian Air Force (RAAF) officer. She served as Warrant Officer of the Air Force (WOFF-AF) from 6 November 2019 until 1 December 2022. Grasby was the first woman to serve as WOFF-AF and the first woman to be appointed a service warrant officer in the Australian Defence Force.

== Early life ==
Grasby was raised in Gwandalan, New South Wales. Her father had served with the 1st Battalion, Royal Australian Regiment during the Vietnam War.

== RAAF career ==
Grasby joined the Royal Australian Air Force (RAAF) at age 17 in 1987. She completed her initial employment training as a supplier but in 1992 remustered as security police, specialising in counterintelligence and special investigations. Promoted to sergeant in 1999, she was appointed Senior Non-Commissioned Officer in Charge of Counterintelligence at No. 86 Wing RAAF. Grasby briefly transferred to the Air Force Reserve from 2001 to 2003, following the birth of her son, but returned to the Permanent Air Force as Senior Non-Commissioned Officer in Charge of Special Investigations for No. 386 Expeditionary Combat Support Squadron RAAF. In this role, she deployed to Iraq in support of Operation Catalyst.

Grasby was appointed a Ground Training Instructor at the RAAF Security and Fire School, RAAF Base Amberley, in 2006, promoted to flight sergeant in 2007, and posted as Base Security Officer at RAAF Base Williams. She returned to the RAAF Security and Fire School in 2009 as Course Director of the Physical and Protective Security Training Flight. In July 2012, Grasby deployed to Afghanistan as second-in-command of the Force Protection and Security Section at Multi National Base Tarin Kot. Returning to Australia in February 2013, she was posted to RAAF Base Amberley as Deputy Security Officer of No. 2 Security Forces Squadron RAAF.

On promotion to warrant officer, Grasby was made Security Manager at No. 82 Wing RAAF in 2014. She subsequently redeployed to Iraq as Facility Security Manager for the Air Task Group – Strike on Operation Okra and, in 2016, was made executive warrant officer of No. 95 Wing RAAF. She was next appointed as Air Command Warrant Officer in January 2018. In the 2019 Queen's Birthday Honours, Grasby was awarded the Medal of the Order of Australia for "meritorious service in the development of leadership and workforce resilience for the Australian Defence Force as a Warrant Officer in Number 82 Wing, the Executive Warrant Officer of Number 95 Wing, and as the Executive Warrant Officer of Air Command."

Grasby succeeded Warrant Officer Robert Swanwick to be appointed the 9th Warrant Officer of the Air Force (WOFF-AF) on 6 November 2019. She was the first woman to serve as WOFF-AF and the first woman to be appointed a service warrant officer in the Australian Defence Force. Grasby handed over the role to Warrant Officer Ralph Clifton in December 2022. She was subsequently commissioned as an officer and, as a wing commander, was appointed commanding officer of the Joint Military Police Force.

== Personal life ==
Grasby is married and has two children, a daughter and a son.

Military offices
| Preceded by Robert Swanwick | Warrant Officer of the Air Force; 2019–2022 | Succeeded by Ralph Clifton |
