= Kevin West (military officer) =

Canadian military personnel

Kevin West MMM MSM CD
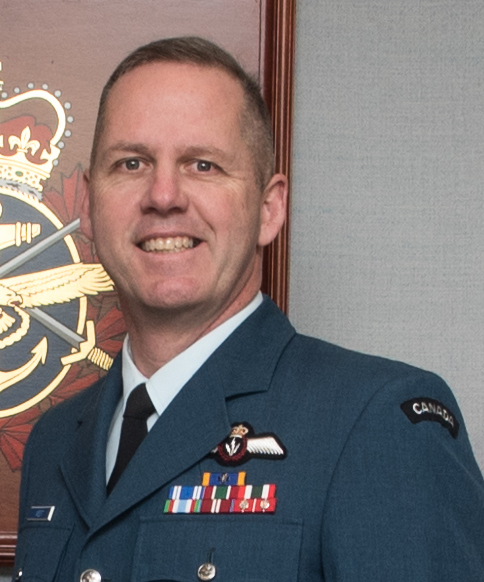
- West in 2018
- Military career
- Allegiance: Canada
- Branch: Royal Canadian Air Force
- Service years: 1983–2018
- Rank: Chief Warrant Officer
- Commands: Canadian Forces Chief Warrant Officer (2013–2018) Royal Canadian Air Force Command Chief Warrant Officer (2012 - 2013) 8 Wing Trenton Chief Warrant Officer (2009 - 2012)
- Conflicts: Operation Sharp Guard

Chief Warrant Officer Kevin Charles West, MMM, MSM, CD is a retired chief warrant officer of the Royal Canadian Air Force. He served as the 12th Canadian Force Chief Warrant Officer and was previously the Chief Warrant Officer of the Royal Canadian Air Force.

== Military career ==
In the summer of 1983, West joined the Canadian Forces Naval Reserve as a signalman. In January 1985, he transferred to the Regular Force and was posted to CFB Esquimalt. In 1987, he was promoted to able seaman and posted to HMCS Gatineau. During his time in the Navy, he sailed in a number of ships on the East Coast of Canada.

In 1990, he underwent an occupational transfer to the Airborne Electronic Sensor Operator Trade and therefore became a member of the Air Force. In the rank of corporal he undertook basic aircrew training at 19 Wing Comox and then Maritime Operational Aircrew Training at 404 Squadron. In 1991, having received his wings, he was posted to No. 415 Maritime Patrol Squadron.

In 1995, he was promoted to sergeant and deployed on several operations including Op Sharp Guard in support of the United Nation sanctions in Bosnia. Promoted to Warrant Officer in 1998, he was posted to 405 MP squadron and in 2000 he was promoted to Master Warrant Officer and posted to 1 Canadian Air Division HQ. In 2006 was as promoted and posted to Canadian Forces Air Navigation School as the school CWO. In June 2007, CWO West was appointed as the first Non-Commissioned Member (NCM) Commandant of the NCM Professional Development Centre in Saint-Jean, Quebec. In 2009 he was appointed 8 Wing CWO before deploying as the Joint Task Force-Afghanistan Air Wing CWO in 2011. In 2011, CWO West was presented the CDS Commendation by General Walt Natynczk for holding "not only the base but the surrounding community together in the aftermath of the horrific murders carried out by Trenton's former commander, Russell Williams."

Kevin West retired in 2018 amid controversy surrounding a "party flight" where former NHL hockey player Dave "Tiger" Williams was charged with assault and sexual assault arising from an in-flight incident (the charges were later dropped as part of a pre-trial agreement). West, who was on board the aircraft when the incident took place, claimed: "I wish I had known. I would stopped everything right there. More action would have been taken." Shortly after his retirement West was re-hired by the CAF as a civilian contractor as a sexual assault victims advocate.

== Honours and decorations ==
West has received the following decorations during his military career:

Ribbon	Description	Notes
	Order of Military Merit (MMM)	Member
	Meritorious Service Medal (MSM)	2012; Military Division
	General Campaign Star	Southwest Asia
	Special Service Medal	With 1 bar
	Canadian Peacekeeping Service Medal	
	Queen Elizabeth II Diamond Jubilee Medal	2012; Canadian Version of this Medal
	Canadian Forces' Decoration (CD)	With 2 clasp

He received the Meritorious Service Medal for his 2011 leadership efforts in Afghanistan.

In addition to these medals, Kevin West has also received the following:

- Airborne Electronic Sensor Operator wings
- Chief of the Defence Staff Commendation
- Command Commendation
- Ship's and Shallow Water Diver badge
- Basic Parachutist Wings
- Gun Metal Sea Service Insignia

Military offices
Preceded by Robert Cléroux	Canadian Forces Chief Warrant Officer; 2013–18	Succeeded by Alain Guimond
