= Mark Tandy (RAN officer) =

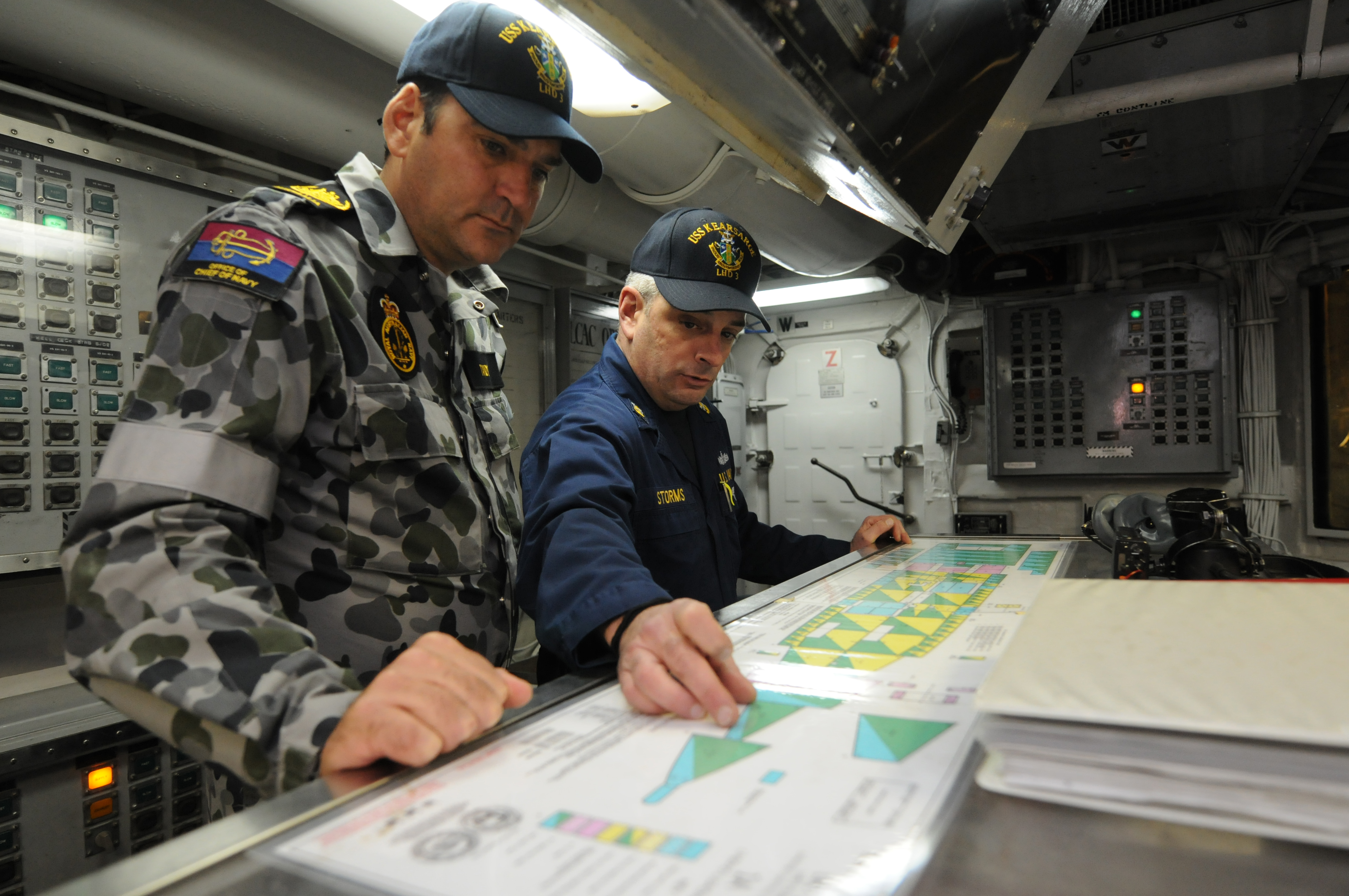
- Warrant Officer Mark Tandy (left) in February 2010
- Born: Roebourne, Western Australia
- Military career
- Allegiance: Australia
- Branch: Royal Australian Navy
- Service years: 1982–present
- Rank: Commander
- Commands: NHQ Tasmania; Navy's Indigenous Development Program (2020–present); Warrant Officer of the Navy (2008–12)
- Awards: Conspicuous Service Cross & Bar

Commander Mark Raymond Tandy, CSC & Bar is an officer of the Royal Australian Navy (RAN). He joined the RAN as a radio operator in 1982 and rose through the ranks to become Warrant Officer of the Navy in 2008. He relinquished the post in 2012 and was subsequently commissioned as an officer.

== Early years ==
Tandy was born in Roebourne, Western Australia, and educated in Tennant Creek and Darwin. He joined the Royal Australian Navy (RAN) in 1982 as a radio operator.

== Naval career ==
Tandy has served as either the Communications operator or supervisor at a number of establishments and ships of the RAN. Shore postings have included HMAS Albatross (Nowra), HMAS Coonawarra (Darwin), HMAS Harman (Canberra), HMAS Cerberus (Western Port Bay), ADF Recruiting Unit (Townsville) and Strategic Headquarters (Canberra). Sea postings have included HMAS Jervis Bay, HMAS Canberra, HMAS Cessnock, HMAS Warrnambool, HMAS Dubbo and HMAS Success.

In December 2002, Tandy was promoted to warrant officer and assumed the role of Operations Officer at the Naval Communications Area Master Station Australia (NAVCAMSAUS) during the Iraq War. In 2004, while posted as an instructor to the Royal Australian Naval College at HMAS Creswell, he received a Commanding Officer's Commendation, and a Navy Systems Command Quarterly Contribution award. On exchange with the Royal Navy in 2005, he spent four months at HMS Collingwood as a lead instructor at the Command and Training Group.

Tandy was selected to be the sixth Warrant Officer of the Navy in October 2008 and took up the appointment on 19 December 2008. He was awarded the Conspicuous Service Cross in the 2011 Queen's Birthday Honours in recognition of his "outstanding achievement" in this role.

In July 2012 Tandy stood down as the Warrant Officer of the Navy, joining a program which allowed him to become an officer. He was appointed to the rank of lieutenant commander and served as executive officer of Naval Headquarters, South Queensland. Tandy was subsequently appointed Officer in Charge Navy Indigenous Development Program. In the 2022 Queen's Birthday Honours, he was awarded a Bar to his Conspicuous Service Cross for his "outstanding devotion to duty" in leading the Indigenous Development Program.

Tandy holds a Master in Maritime Studies degree from the Australian Command and Staff College at Weston Creek (2007).

Military offices
Preceded by Warrant Officer James Levay	Warrant Officer of the Navy; 2008–2012	Succeeded by Warrant Officer Martin Holzberger
