= Warrant officer of the Navy (New Zealand) =

- Warrant Officer insignia
- Incumbent; Darren Crosby since 18 Sept 2024
- Style: Warrant Officer
- Member of: Royal New Zealand Navy
- Reports to: Chief of the Navy
- Term length: Three years
- Inaugural holder: WO White

Warrant officer of the Navy is the most senior Warrant Officer in the Royal New Zealand Navy. It is a singular appointment – it is only held by one person at any time.

The Warrant Officer of the Navy is responsible to the Chief of the Navy and is a member of their staff and provides the Chief of the Navy and senior leaders with advice about all issues affecting sailors.

== Warrant Officers of the Navy ==
No.	Portrait	Name	Took office	Left office	Time in office	Ref.
1	Colin White	WOCEA; Colin White	1 Jul 1997	?	?	
2	Mark Te Kani	WOMAA; Mark Te Kani	?	?	?	
3	Paul Rennie	WOWT; Paul Rennie	?	?	?	
4	Neil Roberts	WOSA; Neil Roberts	?	?	?	
5	Dean Bloor	WO; Dean Bloor	?	2013	?	
6	Leonard Shailes	WOSA; Leonard Shailes	2013	21 February 2014	0–1 years	
7	Steve Bourke	WOCH; Steve Bourke	21 February 2014	20 February 2017	2 years, 365 days	
8	Wayne Dyke	WOCWS; Wayne Dyke	20 February 2017	29 January 2021	3 years, 344 days	
9	Lance Graham	WODR; Lance Graham	29 January 2021	Incumbent	5 years, 222 days	
10	Darren Crosby	WODR; Darren Crosby	18 Sept 2024	Incumbent	1 year, 355 days	
