= Martin Holzberger =

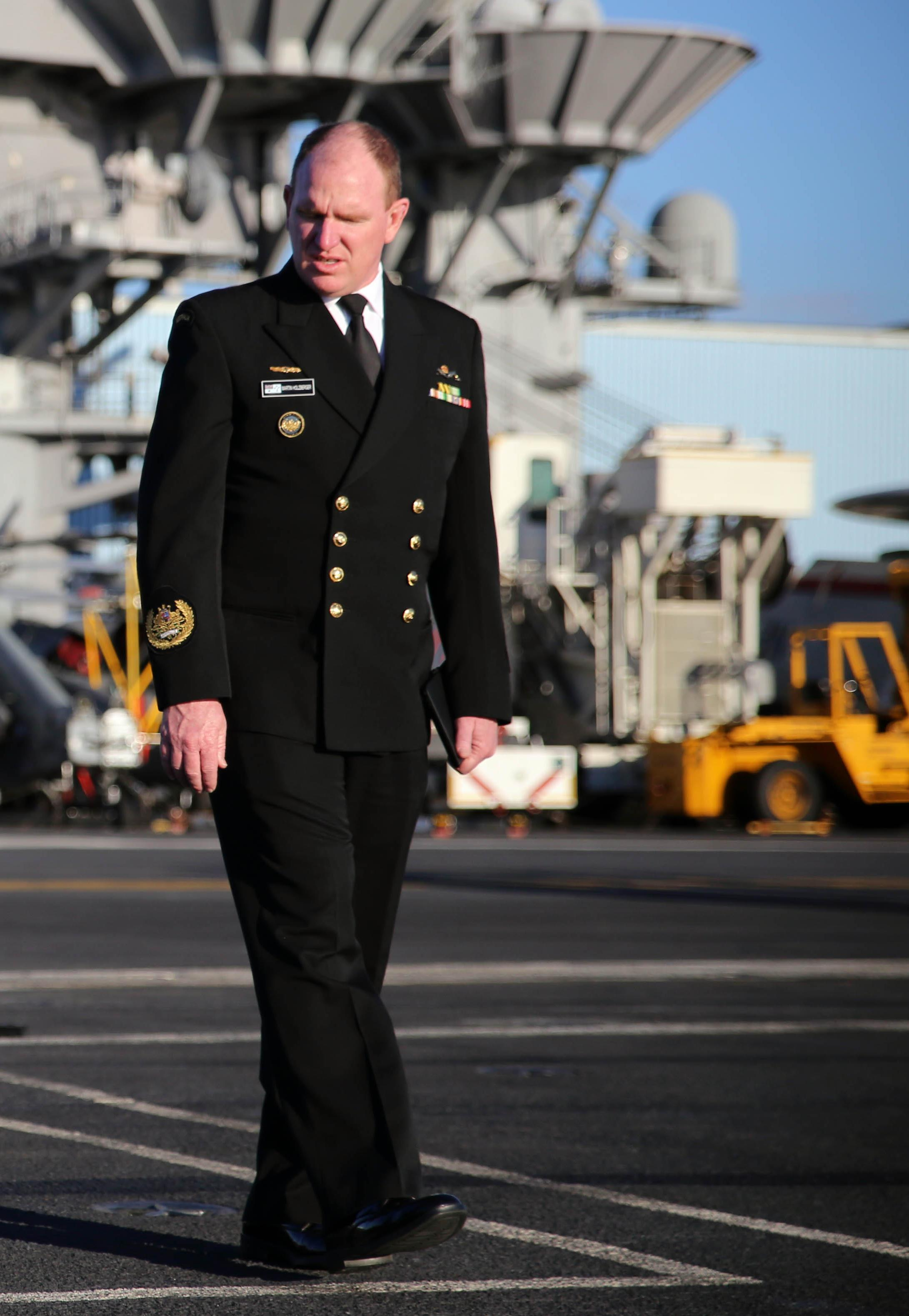
- Warrant Officer Holzberger in July 2013
- Born: 1 September 1968 (age 58); Brisbane, Queensland
- Military career
- Allegiance: Australia
- Branch: Royal Australian Navy
- Service years: 1987–present
- Rank: Commander
- Nickname: "Blue"
- Commands: Warrant Officer of the Navy
- Conflicts: War in Afghanistan
- Awards: Member of the Order of Australia; Conspicuous Service Cross; Navy & Marine Corps Commendation Medal (United States)

Martin Grant Holzberger, AM, CSC (born 1 September 1968) is an officer of the Royal Australian Navy (RAN). He joined the RAN as a submariner in 1987 and rose through the ranks to become the 7th Warrant Officer of the Navy in 2012. He relinquished the post in 2016 and was subsequently commissioned as an officer.

== Naval career ==
Holzberger joined the Royal Australian Navy (RAN) in 1987 as a submariner and served on various submarines, including Chief of the Boat on HMAS Sheean.

In 2004 Holzberger was selected for an exchanged with the United States Navy Pacific Fleet. In 2007 he was selected by the Ships Warrant Officer selection board and then joined HMAS Warramunga as the Ships Warrant Officer. He was awarded the Conspicuous Service Cross in 2012 for his service in this role.

Holzberger was appointed Command Warrant Officer – Fleet Command in March 2010 and in 2012 he became the seventh Warrant Officer of the Navy (WO-N). He was appointed a Member of the Order of Australia in 2015. He relinquished the post of WO-N to Warrant Officer Gary Wight in April 2016 and was subsequently commissioned as an officer. From February 2021 to December 2022, he was the executive officer of the training establishment HMAS Cerberus.

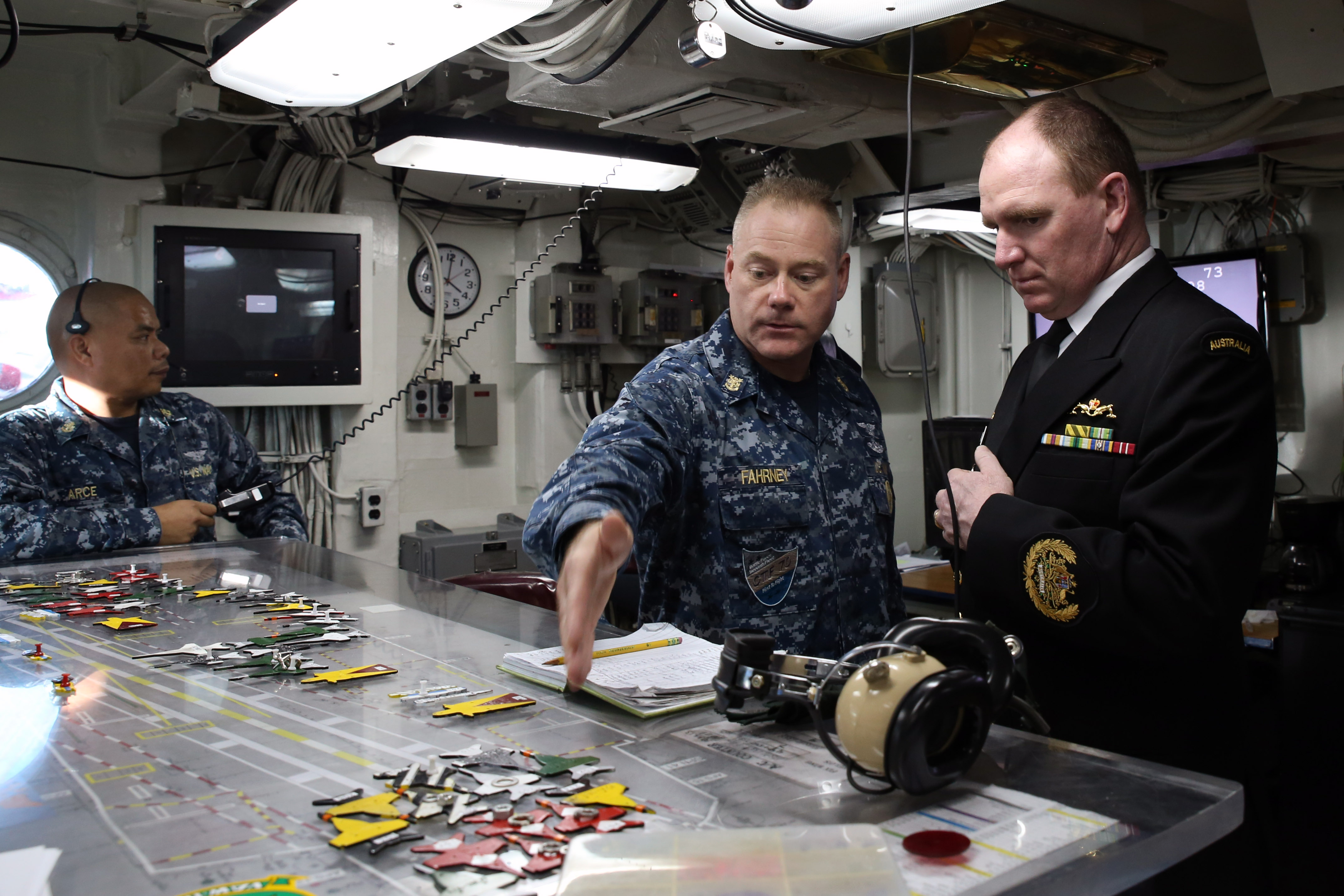
Holzeberger visits the USS George Washington

Military offices
Preceded by Mark Tandy	Warrant Officer of the Navy; 2012–2016	Succeeded by Gary Wight
