= Regimental Sergeant Major of the Army (Australia) =

Most senior warrant officer in the Australian Army

Regimental Sergeant Major of the Australian Army (RSM-A)
- Incumbent; Brad Doyle since 8 July 2026
- Style: Regimental Sergeant Major of the Army (Warrant Officer)
- Inaugural holder: Wally Thompson

Regimental Sergeant Major - Army (RSM-A) is the most senior warrant officer in the Australian Army. It is a singular appointment – it is only held by one person at any time. RSM-A holds the unique rank of warrant officer (WO), which is senior to the rank of warrant officer class one. The special insignia for the RSM-A is the Australian coat of arms with a wreath around it. The thirteenth and current Regimental Sergeant Major of the Army is Brad Doyle.

Based on the United States Army practice of appointing a Sergeant Major of the Army, the RSM-A is the senior soldier of the Australian Army and principal non-commissioned advisor to the Chief of Army. The RSM-A's primary role is to represent the views, concerns and opinions of the soldiers in the Army to senior leaders. They also carry the Chief of Army's message and intent down and across the ranks.

The appointment is the equivalent of the Warrant Officer of the Navy (WO-N) in the Royal Australian Navy, and the Warrant Officer of the Air Force (WOFF-AF) in the Royal Australian Air Force.

The post was created by the then Chief of Army, Lieutenant General Sir Phillip Bennett.

== Appointees ==
No.	Portrait	Name	Took office	Left office	Ref.
1	Wally Thompson OAM	Warrant Officer; Wally Thompson OAM (1932–2012)	January 1983	January 1987	
2	Kevin Wendt OAM, BEM	Warrant Officer; Kevin Wendt OAM, BEM (1943–2020)	January 1987	December 1990	
3	Peter Prewett CSC, OAM	Warrant Officer; Peter Prewett CSC, OAM (born 1944)	January 1991	December 1993	
4	Arthur Francis CSC, OAM	Warrant Officer; Arthur Francis CSC, OAM (1946–2016)	December 1993	December 1996	
5	Peter Rosemond CSC, OAM	Warrant Officer; Peter Rosemond CSC, OAM (born 1950)	December 1996	March 2001	
6	Brian Boughton CSC, OAM	Warrant Officer; Brian Boughton CSC, OAM (1950–2026)	March 2001	19 December 2003	
7	Kevin Woods CSC, OAM	Warrant Officer; Kevin Woods CSC, OAM	19 December 2003	29 February 2008	
8	Stephen Ward OAM	Warrant Officer; Stephen Ward OAM (born 1956)	29 February 2008	4 October 2011	
9	Dave Ashley AM	Warrant Officer; Dave Ashley AM (born 1959)	4 October 2011	9 July 2015	
10	Donald Spinks AM	Warrant Officer; Donald Spinks AM	9 July 2015	2 July 2018	
11	Grant McFarlane AM	Warrant Officer; Grant McFarlane AM	2 July 2018	1 July 2022	
12	Kim Felmingham NSC, OAM	Warrant Officer; Kim Felmingham NSC, OAM	1 July 2022	8 July 2026	
13	Brad Doyle OAM	Warrant Officer; Brad Doyle OAM	8 July 2026		

== See also ==
- Sergeant Major of the Army
- Army Sergeant Major
- Sergeant Major of the Army (Denmark)
- Sergeant Major of the Army (South Africa)
