= Warrant Officer of the Navy =

Most senior sailor in the Royal Australian Navy

- WO-N special insignia
- Incumbent; Cheryl Collins since 10 July 2026
- Abbreviation: WO-N
- Reports to: Chief of Navy; Senior Enlisted Advisor
- Formation: 1993
- First holder: Paul Whittaker

Warrant Officer of the Navy (WO-N) is the most senior sailor in the Royal Australian Navy (RAN). It is a singular appointment, being only held by one person at any time. The special insignia for the WO-N is the Australian coat of arms with a wreath around it. The current Warrant Officer of the Navy is Cheryl Collins.

The appointment is the equivalent of the Regimental Sergeant Major of the Army (RSM-A) in the Australian Army, and Warrant Officer of the Air Force (WOFF-AF) in the Royal Australian Air Force.

== Appointees ==
No.	Portrait	Name	Took office	Left office	Ref.
1	Paul Whittaker AM	Warrant Officer; Paul Whittaker AM (born 1949)	December 1993	January 1997	
2	Michael McConnell OAM	Warrant Officer; Michael McConnell OAM (born 1952)	January 1997	1999	
3	David Wilson AM	Warrant Officer; David Wilson AM	1999	27 September 2002	
4	David Turner AM	Warrant Officer; David Turner AM	27 September 2002	16 December 2005	
5	James Levay	Warrant Officer; James Levay	16 December 2005	19 December 2008	
6	Mark Tandy CSC	Warrant Officer; Mark Tandy CSC	19 December 2008	12 July 2012	
7	Martin Holzberger AM, CSC	Warrant Officer; Martin Holzberger AM, CSC (born 1968)	12 July 2012	29 April 2016	
8	Gary Wight AM	Warrant Officer; Gary Wight AM (born 1968)	29 April 2016	22 November 2019	
9	Deb Butterworth OAM, CSM & Bar	Warrant Officer; Deb Butterworth OAM, CSM & Bar	22 November 2019	16 December 2022	
10	Andrew Bertoncin OAM	Warrant Officer; Andrew Bertoncin OAM	16 December 2022	10 July 2026	
11	Cheryl Collins OAM, CSM	Warrant Officer; Cheryl Collins OAM, CSM	10 July 2026		
