= Military ranks of Rhodesia =

The Military ranks of Rhodesia were the military insignia used by the Rhodesian Security Forces. Since Rhodesia was a landlocked country, the Security Force did not have a navy. Being a former British colony, Rhodesia shared a rank structure similar to that of the United Kingdom.

Since 1980, they have been replaced by the military ranks of Zimbabwe.

== Commissioned officer ranks ==
The rank insignia of commissioned officers.

Rank group	General / flag officers				Senior officers			Junior officers
Rhodesian Army
Rhodesian Army		Lieutenant general	Major general	Brigadier	Colonel	Lieutenant colonel	Major	Captain	Lieutenant	Second lieutenant
Rhodesian Air Force
Rhodesian Air Force		Air marshal	Air vice-marshal	Air commodore	Group captain	Wing commander	Squadron leader	Flight lieutenant	Air lieutenant	Air sub-lieutenant
Rhodesian Internal Affairs; Regular Service
Rhodesian Internal Affairs; Regular Service			Provincial commissioner	District commissioner	Assistant district commissioner	Senior district officer	District officer
National Service
National Service								Senior vedette officer	Vedette officer	Ensign
Rhodesian Guard Force
Rhodesian Guard Force				Commander	Deputy Commander	Senior Commandant	Commandant	Assistant Commandant	Junior Commandant II	Junior Commandant I
British South Africa Police
British South Africa Police	Commissioner	Deputy commissioner	Senior assistant commissioner	Assistant commissioner		Chief superintendent	Superintendent	Chief inspector	Inspector
Rank group	General / flag officers				Senior officers			Junior officers

=== Student officer ranks ===
Rank group	Student officer
Rhodesian Internal Affairs; Regular Service
Rhodesian Internal Affairs; Regular Service	Cadet I	Cadet II
Rhodesian Internal Affairs; National Service
Rhodesian Internal Affairs; National Service	National service cadet I	National service cadet II	National service cadet III	National service cadet IV

== Other ranks ==
The rank insignia of non-commissioned officers and enlisted personnel.

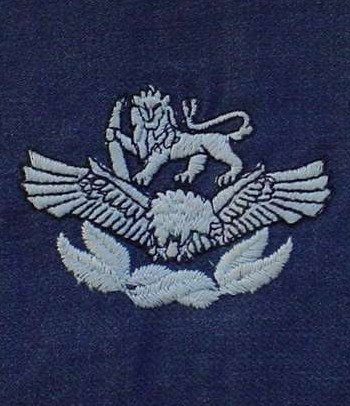
Rank group	Senior NCOs						Junior NCOs		Enlisted
Rhodesian Army									No insignia
Rhodesian Army	Warrant officer class 1			Warrant officer class 2	Staff sergeant	Sergeant	Corporal	Lance corporal	Private (or equivalent)
Rhodesian Air Force				Warrant officer class 2 / Master Technician / Master Sergeant							No insignia
Rhodesian Air Force	Station warrant officer		Warrant officer class 1	Warrant officer class 2 / Master Technician / Master Sergeant	Flight sergeant	Sergeant	Corporal		Senior aircraftman	Leading aircraftman	Aircraftman
Rhodesian Internal Affairs; Regular Service									No insignia
Rhodesian Internal Affairs; Regular Service	Warrant officer					Senior district assistant	District assistant grade I	District assistant grade II	Private
National Service									No insignia
National Service	Vedette senior warrant officer			Vedette junior warrant officer	Staff vedette	Vedette detachment leader	Vedette section leader	Senior vedette	Vedette
Rhodesian Guard Force									No insignia
Rhodesian Guard Force	Keep commander	Deputy keep commander	Keep warrant officer		Keep senior sergeant	Keep sergeant	Keep corporal	Junior corporal	Guard
British South Africa Police
British South Africa Police	Section officer	Senior patrol officer	Patrol officer	Senior sergeant	First sergeant	Sergeant			Constable
Rank group	Senior NCOs						Junior NCOs		Enlisted
