= Sergeant Major of the Air Force =

Most senior warrant officer of the South African Air Force

Sergeant Major of the South African Air Force
- Incumbent; Matinatima Klaas Mofomme since 31 May 2022
- South African Air Force
- Type: Senior enlisted advisor
- Reports to: Chief of the Air Force
- Formation: December 1979
- First holder: WO1 A. C. Symonds

The sergeant major of the South African Air Force is the most senior warrant officer. The post was created in 1979. It is a singular appointment, held by only one person at any time. The sergeant major of the Air Force reports to the chief of the Air Force and is responsible for maintaining discipline.

== Rank and insignia ==
Before 2008, all sergeant majors of the Air Force were warrant officer class 1, with appointment to the position of sergeant major. In 2008, the SANDF expanded the warrant officer ranks and the sergeant major of the Air Force now holds the rank of senior chief warrant officer.

Before 2002, the sergeant major of the Air Force had a unique rank insignia, consisting of a warrant officer class 1 insignia with the South African Air Force badge above it. Following the warrant officer rank redesign, the sergeant major of the Air Force does not have a unique rank insignia.

== List of officeholders ==
No.	Portrait	Name (born–died)	Term of office			Ref.
No.	Portrait	Name (born–died)	Took office	Left office	Time in office	Ref.
1		WO1; A. C. Symonds	December 1979	September 1981	1 year, 9 months	
2		WO1; Barry Kemp	1 October 1981	January 1988	6 years, 3 months	
3		WO1; S. G. Oberholzer	February 1988	October 1990	2 years, 8 months	
4		WO1; S. J. Mountjoy	November 1990	January 1994	3 years, 2 months	
5		WO1; Cor Nortje	February 1994	February 2000	6 years	
6		WO1; Paul Nel	March 2000	30 October 2002	2 years, 7 months	
7		SCWO; S. J. Du Preez	1 November 2002	October 2008	5 years, 11 months	
8		SCWO; Lefu Daniel Tshabalala	October 2008	November 2018	10 years, 1 month	
9		SCWO; Colin Stanton-Jones	1 December 2018	May 2022	7 years, 10 months	
10		SCWO; Matinatima Klaas Mofomme	31 May 2022	Incumbent	4 years, 4 months	

== See also ==
- South African Air Force
- South African military ranks
