= Warrant Officer of the Air Force =

Post in Royal Australian Air Force

Warrant Officer of the Royal Australian Air Force (WOFF-AF)
- Incumbent; Ralph Clifton since 1 December 2022
- Style: Warrant Officer of the Air Force (Warrant Officer)
- Inaugural holder: Richard (Dick) Newton
- Website: WOFF-AF

Warrant Officer of the Air Force (WOFF-AF) is the senior Warrant Officer in the Royal Australian Air Force (RAAF). It is a singular appointment, being it is only held by one person at any time. The special insignia for the WOFF-AF is the Australian Coat of Arms encircled by a wreath of Australian native flora. The current Warrant Officer of the Air Force is Ralph Clifton.

Similar to the United States Air Force practice of appointing a Chief Master Sergeant of the Air Force, the WOFF-AF is responsible to the Chief of Air Force (CAF). The post was created in 1993, by the then Chief of the Air Staff, Air Marshal Barry Gration, to provide a conduit between Air Force's senior leadership and the airman ranks.

The WOFF-AF is head of the Royal Australian Air Force's Senior Enlisted Leadership Team (SELT). The SELT comprises all Tier C and Tier B Warrant Officers (E-9) in the Air Force. The members of the SELT have the responsibility of providing support to command, support to the workforce, and welfare for all. The SELT comprises Air Force Warrant Officers selected for Tier progression by CAF to perform the roles of Warrant Officer of the Air Force, Air Force Headquarters and RAAF Air Command Warrant Officers, along with Group, Wing or Base Warrant Officer positions located within Air Force. Tier Warrant Officer positions provide the Warrant Officers with direct contact to Commanders, Executive Staff as well as Senior Officers and Airmen.

The SELT participate in open discussion forums designed to look at issues facing Air Force and enlisted personnel now and in the future. This enables a shared understanding of matters affecting Air Force and enlisted personnel across the whole Force, and where appropriate the Australian Defence Force (ADF). With the SELT geographically dispersed across the country, it is important that there is a common understanding of the issues in Air Force, ADF and with enlisted personnel.

Under the leadership of WOFF-AF, the SELT develops team behaviors to support inclusive leadership. Within the Australian Defence Force, the Air Force provides senior enlisted leaders for key strategic and operational appointments in the Joint environment.

Since 2017, upon appointment to the position of WOFF-AF, E-9 Warrant Officers are promoted to the Enlisted Rank of E-10.

The WOFF-AF appointment is an equal peer to the Regimental Sergeant Major of the Army (RSM-A) in the Australian Army and Warrant Officer of the Navy (WO-N) in the Royal Australian Navy.

== Appointees ==
#	Name	Term began	Term ended	Rank	Notes
1	Richard (Dick) Newton AM	15 February 1993	4 February 1996	E-9	Retired from Active Duty
2	Bryan Tuckey OAM	5 February 1996	13 June 1999	E-9	Retired from Active Duty
3	John Boydell	14 June 1999	1 August 2002	E-9	Retired from Active Duty
4	Peter Hall AM	2 August 2002	15 December 2005	E-9	Commissioned and promoted wing commander (O5)
5	Ray Woolnough AM	16 December 2005	16 December 2008	E-9	Retired from Active Duty
6	John (JJ) Millar AM	16 December 2008	4 November 2011	E-9	Commissioned squadron leader (O4) on leaving post
7	Mark Pentreath CSM	4 November 2011	1 December 2015	E-9	Commissioned squadron leader (O4) on leaving post
8	Robert Swanwick	1 December 2015	6 November 2019	E-10	Retired from Active Duty
9	Fiona Grasby OAM	6 November 2019	1 December 2022	E-10	
10	Ralph Clifton	1 December 2022	Incumbent	E-10	

== Warrant Officer of the Air Force Ensign Raising Ceremony ==
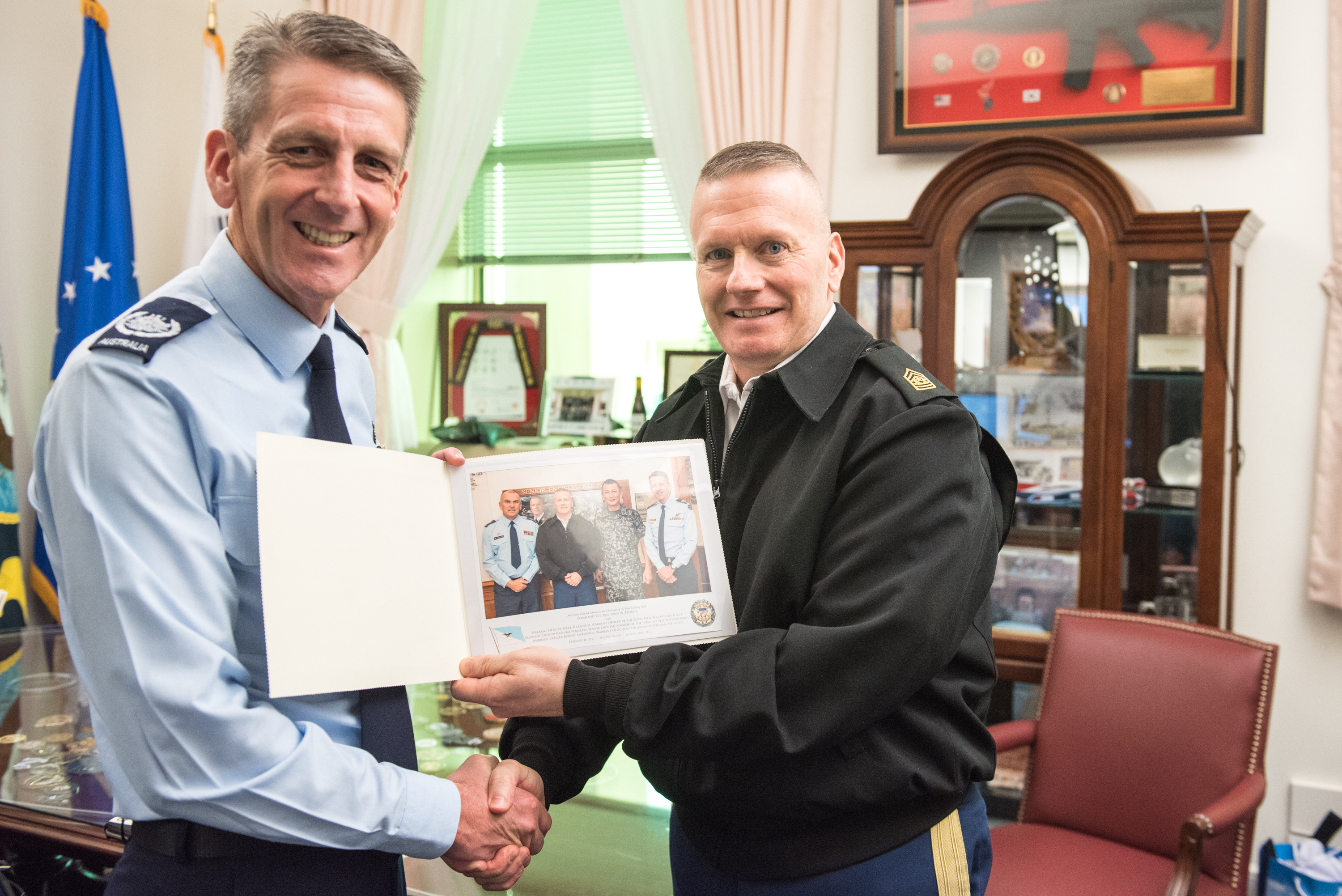
The eighth Warrant Officer of the Air Force, Robert Swanwick (left), with US Senior Enlisted Advisor to the Chairman, Sergeant Major John W. Troxell, in 2017.

Each year on 31 March, at a dawn ceremony on the banks of Lake Burley Griffin at Regatta Point in Australia's capital city of Canberra, the WOFF-AF has the esteemed honour of performing the salute on behalf of all Australian Airmen, as the Royal Australian Air Force Ensign is raised to mark the anniversary of the formation of the Royal Australian Air Force in 1921. The Ensign is hoisted aloft the 40 metre high Canadian Flag Pole by Australia's Federation Guard and flown for the day. The Ensign flying in the National Capital serves as a symbol of the respect the people of Australia hold for the service and sacrifice of the Royal Australian Air Force to the Nation, in times of both war and peace.

== Warrant Officer of the Air Force Badges and Insignia of Office ==
The WOFF-AF undertakes the role of Reviewing Officer at Air Force ceremonial events, such as the graduation parades of enlistees from No 1 Recruit Training Unit (1RTU) at RAAF Base Wagga, and other Air Force or Joint training establishments. On such occasions, the WOFF-AF Pennant is flown.

== Airmen's Code ==
The WOFF-AF is the Royal Australian Air Force's custodian of the Airmen's Code.
