= Matee Molefe =

South African Navy sailor

Matee Joseph Molefe
- Military career
- Allegiance: South Africa
- Branch: South African Navy
- Service years: 1994-
- Rank: Senior Chief Warrant Officer
- Commands: Master at Arms of the South African Navy

Matee Joseph Molefe is a South African sailor, currently serving as Master at Arms of the South African Navy, the highest enlisted post in the Navy.

Malefe was part of the ANC’s armed wing, Umkhonto we Sizwe before being integrated into the Navy in 1994. He served on the SAS Mendi and was appointed Coxswain of the SAS Isandlwana. He was appointed Fleet Master at Arms in 2016 and promoted to Master at Arms of the Navy on 1 February 2018.
