= Chief Petty Officer of the Navy =

Command Chief Petty Officer of the Royal Canadian Navy
- Rank insignia
- Incumbent; CPO1 Pascal Harel since May 2024
- Royal Canadian Navy
- Type: Non-commissioned member
- Reports to: Commander of the Royal Canadian Navy
- Website: Official website

Command Chief Petty Officer of the Royal Canadian Navy is the title of the senior non-commissioned member in the Royal Canadian Navy.

The primary role of the Command Chief is to provide the Commander of the Navy with the non-commissioned sailor's perspective, acting on behalf of all sailors in the Navy.

They are also the senior advisor to the Commander RCN on dress, discipline, professional development, administration, morale, training, welfare, conditions of service and the Quality of Life of all military personnel within the Navy.

== List of RCN Command Chief Petty Officers ==
Name	Tenure
Roy Robertson	1968 – 1971
William Doncaster	1971 – 1977
Jim Puddifant	1977 – 1980
Fred McKee	1980 – 1981
Joe Fillion	1981 – 1986
Terry Shergold	1986 – 1989
Ray Soucie	1989
Jim Carroll	1989 – 1991
Mark St. George	1991
Don (Buster) Brown	1991 – 1995
Terry Melloche	1995 – 1999
Richard Lupien	1999 – 2001
Dave Mollison	2001
Serge Joncas	2001 – 2004
Kim Davis	2004 – 2007
Robert Cléroux	2007 – August 2010
Claude Laurendeau	August 2010 – July 2012
Tom Riefesel	August 2012 – August 2016
Michel Vigneault	August 2016 – May 2019
David Steeves	May 2019 – March 2022
Tom Lizotte	March 2022 – 2024
Pascal Harel	March 2024 – present
