= Military ranks of Zimbabwe =

The Military ranks of Zimbabwe are the military insignia used by the Zimbabwe Defence Forces. Zimbabwe is a landlocked country, and does therefore not possess a navy.

== Commissioned officer ranks ==
The rank insignia of commissioned officers.

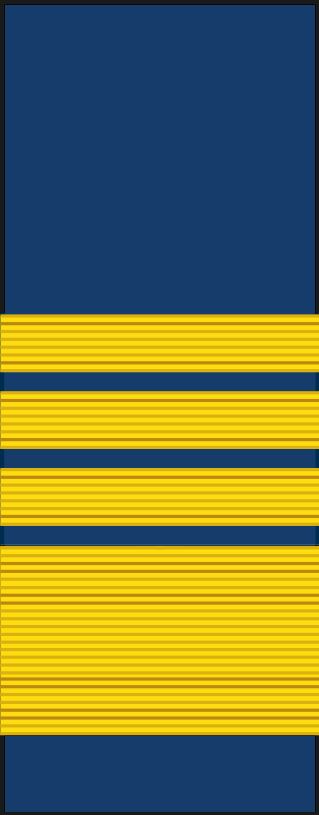
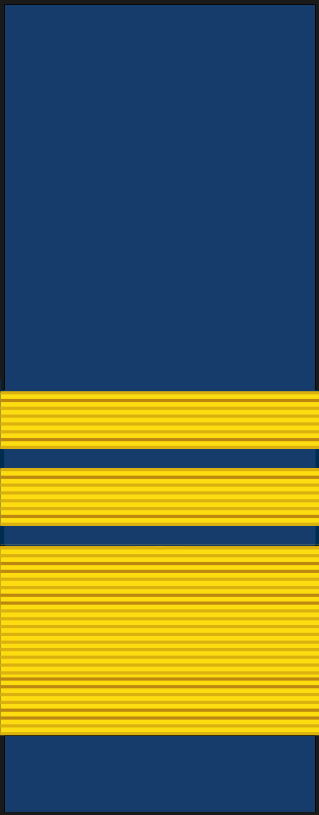
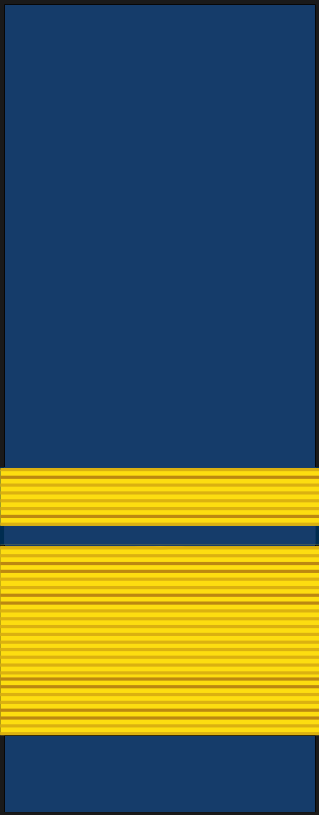
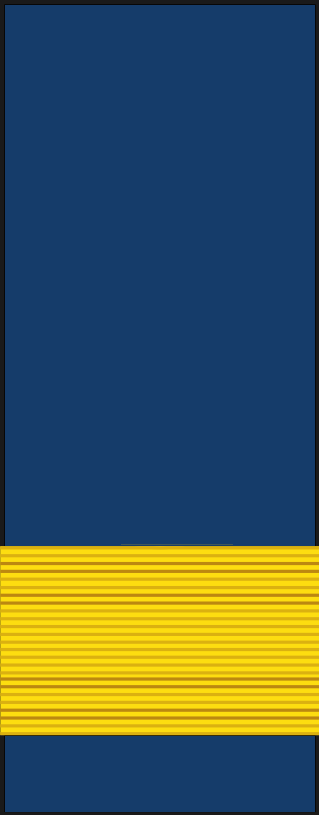
Rank group	General / flag officers				Senior officers			Junior officers
Zimbabwe National Army
Zimbabwe National Army	General	Lieutenant general	Major general	Brigadier	Colonel	Lieutenant colonel	Major	Captain	Lieutenant	Second lieutenant
Air Force of Zimbabwe
Air Force of Zimbabwe	Air chief marshal	Air marshal	Air vice-marshal	Air commodore	Group captain	Wing commander	Squadron leader	Flight lieutenant	Air lieutenant	Air sub-lieutenant
Rank group	General / flag officers				Senior officers			Junior officers

== Other ranks ==
The rank insignia of non-commissioned officers and enlisted personnel.

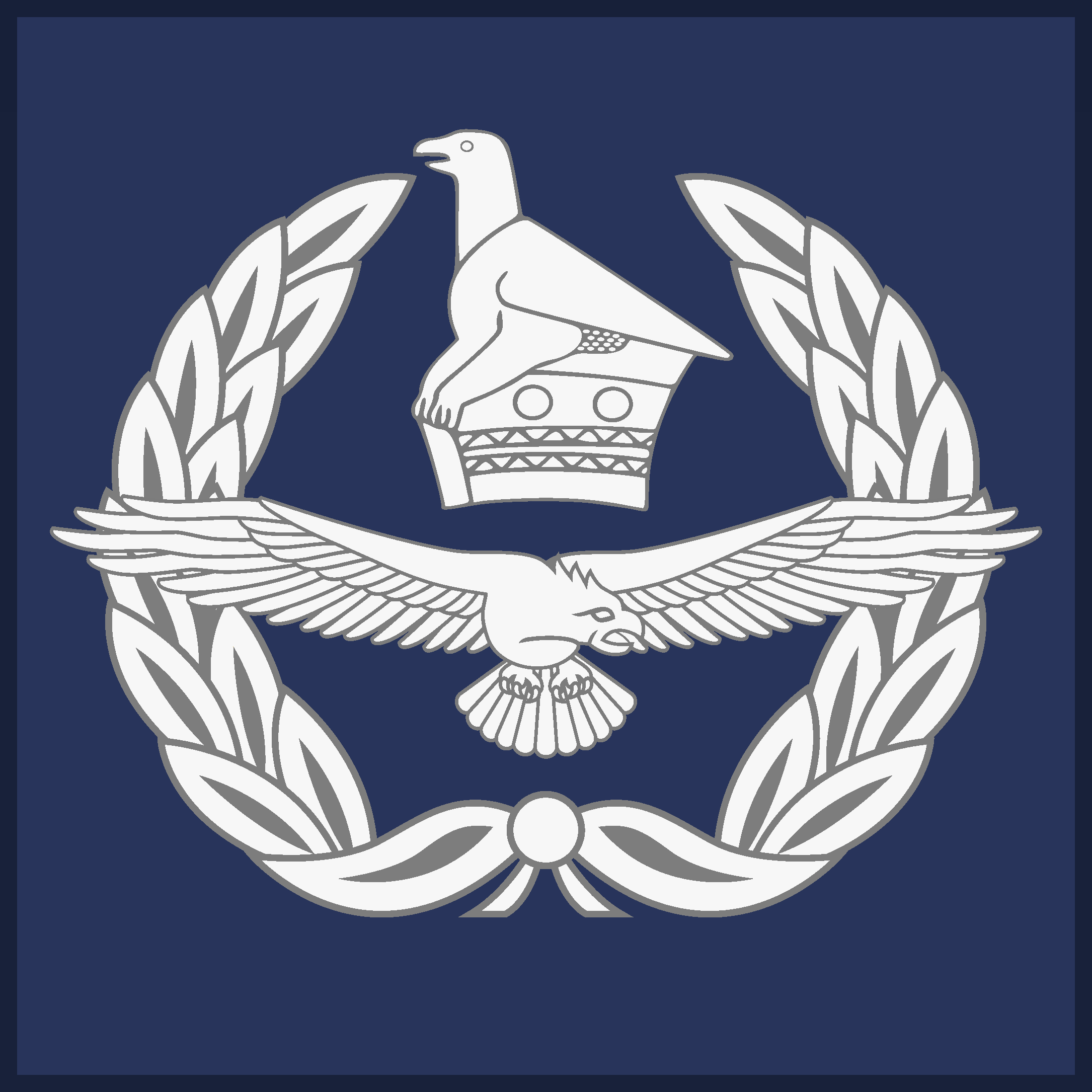
Rank group	Senior NCOs							Junior NCOs		Enlisted
Zimbabwe National Army										No insignia
Zimbabwe National Army	Regimental sergeant major	Warrant officer class 1	Warrant officer class 2		Staff sergeant		Sergeant	Corporal	Lance corporal	Private (or equivalent)
Air Force of Zimbabwe											No insignia
Air Force of Zimbabwe	Warrant officer class 1		Master technician	Warrant officer class 2	Master sergeant	Flight sergeant	Sergeant	Corporal	Senior aircraftman	Leading aircraftman	Aircraftman
Rank group	Senior NCOs							Junior NCOs		Enlisted
