= Sergeant Major of the Army (South Africa) =

Most senior warrant officer in the South African Army

Sergeant Major of the South African Army
- Sersant-Majoor van die Suid-Afrikaanse Leër
- Current Rank insignia

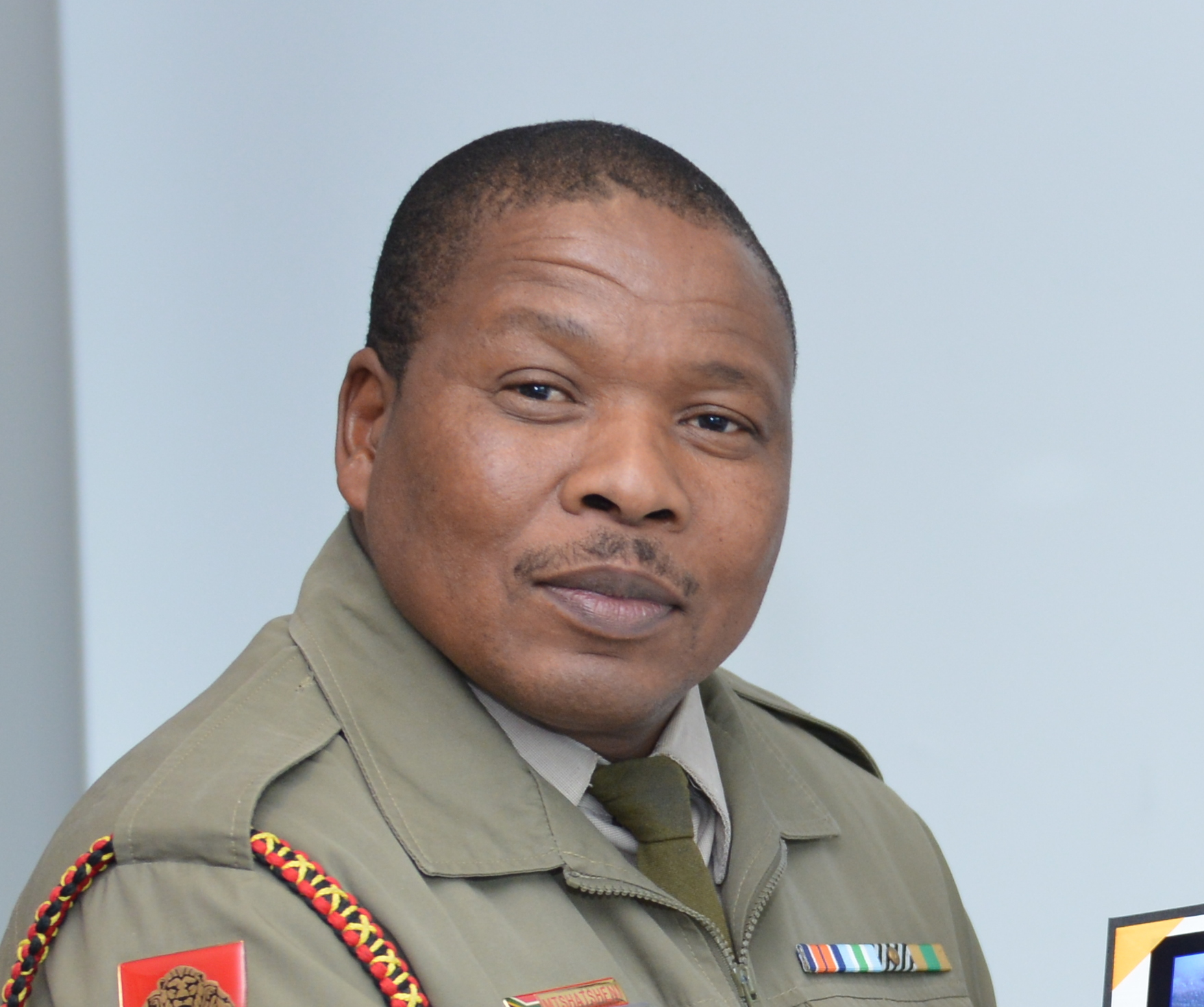
- Incumbent; Ncedakele Mtshatsheni since 1 February 2017
- South African Army
- Reports to: Chief of the Army
- Formation: 3 October 1967
- First holder: WO1 J.A.B. du Preez PMM
- Website: Official website

The Sergeant Major of the South African Army is the most senior Warrant Officer in the South African Army. The post was created in 1967. It is a singular appointment – it is only held by one person at any time. The Sergeant Major of the Army reports to the Chief of the Army and is responsible for maintaining discipline in the Army

== Rank and insignia ==
=== Rank ===
Before 2008 all Sergeant Majors of the Army held the rank of Warrant Officer Class 1, with appointment to the position of Sergeant Major of the Army. In 2008 the SANDF expanded the Warrant Officer ranks and the Sergeant Major of the Army now holds the rank of Senior Chief Warrant Officer.

=== Insignia ===
Prior to 2002 the Sergeant Major of the Army had a unique rank insignia, consisting of a Warrant Officer class 1 insignia with the South African Army badge above it.

Insignia in the SADF (Pre 1994)

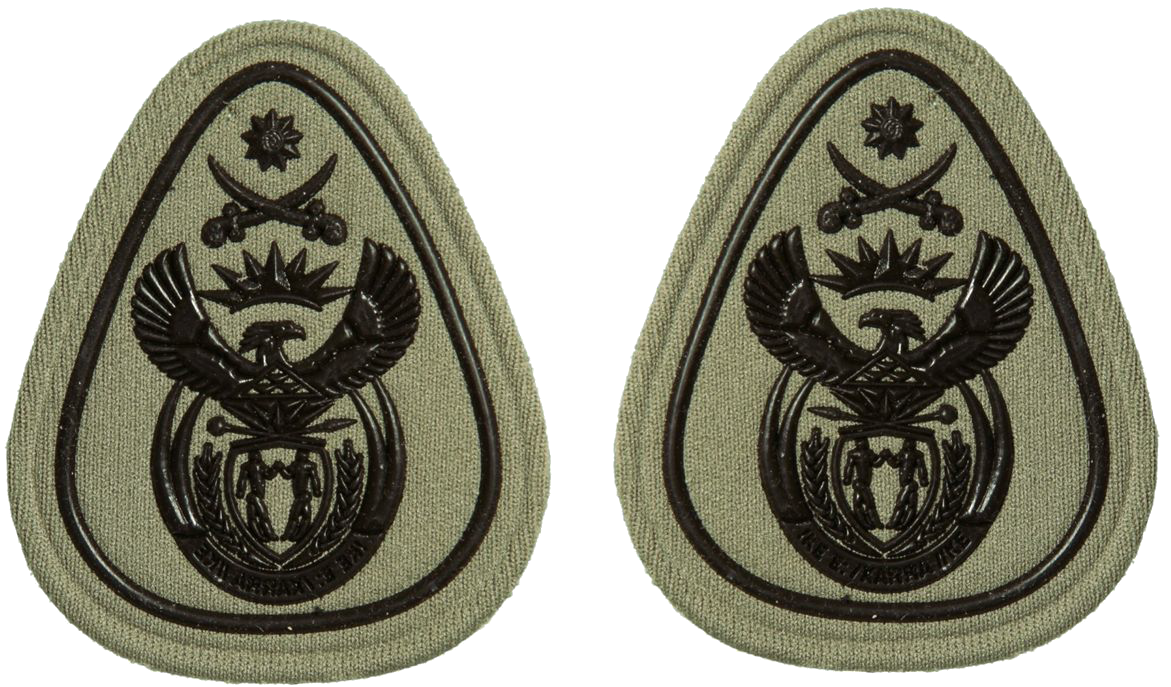
SANDF Rank Insignia WO1 Level 2 embossed badge (Senior Chief Warrant Officer)

After the Warrant Officer rank redesign the Sergeant Major of the Army does not have a unique rank insignia, but rather uses the rank insignia of the rank of Senior Chief Warrant Officer.

== List of officeholders ==
No.	Portrait	Sergeant Major of the Army	Took office	Left office	Time in office	Ref.
1	J.A.B. du Preez PMM	WO1; J.A.B. du Preez PMM	3 October 1967	31 August 1970	2 years, 332 days	
2	Ockert O. Snyman PMM	WO1; Ockert O. Snyman PMM	1 September 1970	31 December 1978	8 years, 121 days	
3	G.A. Erasmus PMM	WO1; G.A. Erasmus PMM	1 January 1979	30 June 1984	5 years, 181 days	
4	Jan J.C. Holiday PMD PMM MMM	WO1; Jan J.C. Holiday PMD PMM MMM	1 July 1984	30 June 1987	2 years, 364 days	
5	Carl FA Röhrbeck PMM MMM	WO1; Carl FA Röhrbeck PMM MMM	1 July 1987	30 April 1990	2 years, 303 days	
6	AJJ Hattingh PMD	WO1; AJJ Hattingh PMD	1 May 1990	30 September 1992	2 years, 152 days	
7	Piet H Röhrbeck PMM	WO1; Piet H Röhrbeck PMM	1 October 1992	31 October 1993	1 year, 30 days	
8	J.J. "Koos" Moorcroft PMD, VRM, PMM, MMM	WO1; J.J. "Koos" Moorcroft PMD, VRM, PMM, MMM	1 November 1993	30 May 2001	7 years, 210 days	
9	Eddie W. Sykes PMD	WO1; Eddie W. Sykes PMD	30 May 2001	30 November 2005	4 years, 183 days	
10	Joseph Tshabalala	WO1; Joseph Tshabalala	1 December 2005	30 March 2007	1 year, 119 days	
11	Mothusi V. Kgaladi	SCWO; Mothusi V. Kgaladi	1 April 2007	31 August 2011	4 years, 152 days	-
–	Kallie Brendenkamp	CWO; Kallie Brendenkamp; Acting	1 September 2011	30 March 2012	211 days	
12	Charles Laubscher PS PMM MMM	SCWO; Charles Laubscher PS PMM MMM	12 February 2012	30 November 2016	4 years, 182 days	
–		SCWO; Ncedakele Mtshatsheni (born 1968)	1 October 2016	31 January 2017	122 days	
13		SCWO; Ncedakele Mtshatsheni (born 1968)	1 February 2017	Incumbent	9 years, 218 days	

== See also ==
- South African military ranks
