= Uniforms of the Royal Navy =

Clothes worn by the Royal Navy

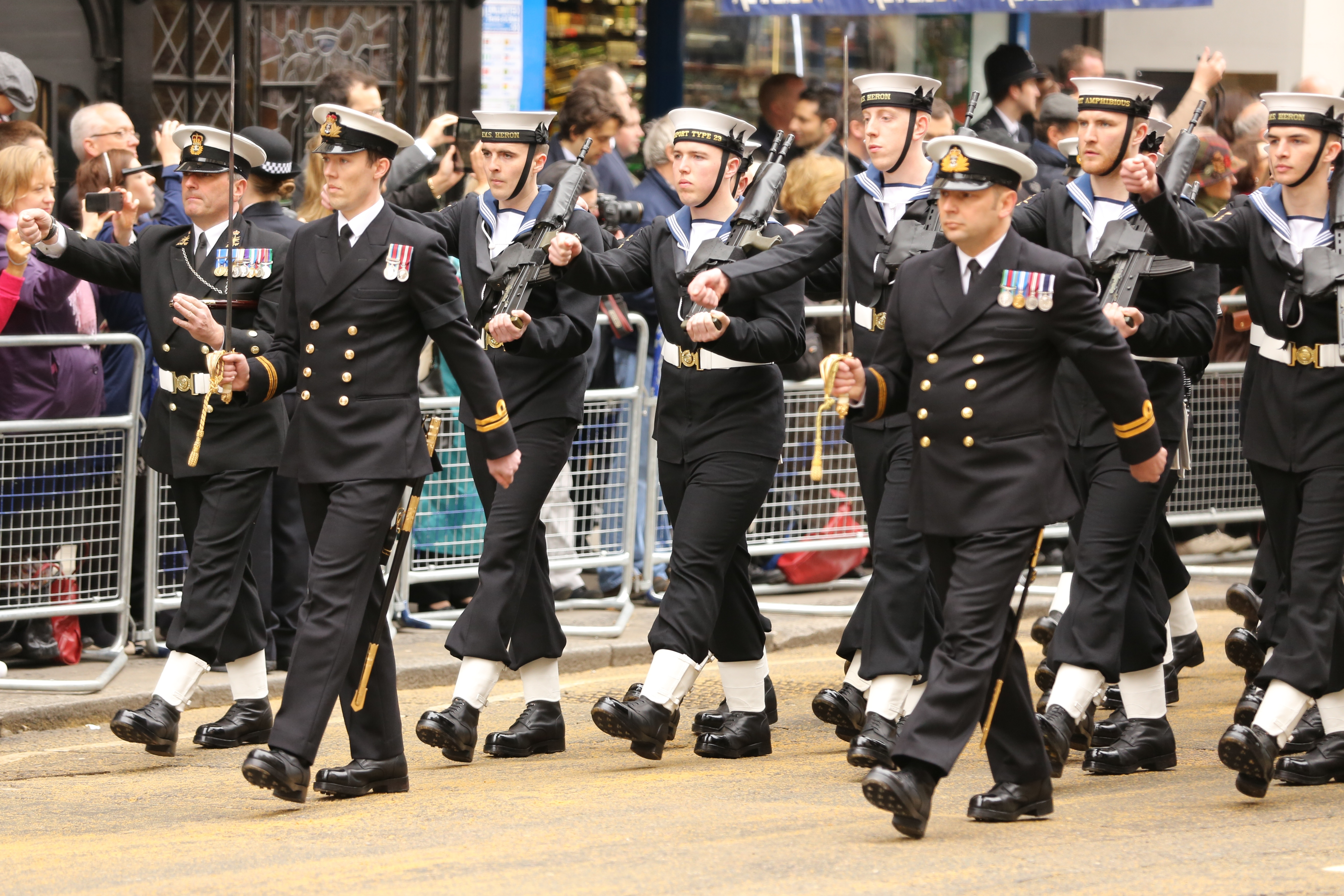
Officers, a Chief Petty Officer and Ratings of the Royal Navy on parade in No. 1 dress uniform.

The uniforms of the Royal Navy have evolved gradually since the first uniform regulations for officers were issued in 1748. The predominant colours of Royal Navy uniforms are navy blue and white. Since reforms in 1997 male and female ratings have worn the same ceremonial uniform.

Royal Naval uniforms have served as the template for many maritime uniforms throughout the world, especially in the British Empire and Commonwealth. The uniforms of the Royal Naval Reserve, the Royal Fleet Auxiliary, the Maritime Volunteer Service, the Sea Cadet Corps, the Navy branch of the Combined Cadet Force and the Volunteer Cadet Corps, as well as modern uniforms of Trinity House, the Royal Australian Navy, the Royal New Zealand Navy, the Royal Malaysian Navy and the Indian Navy are virtually identical to Royal Naval uniforms, with the exception of flashes at shoulder height and on rank slides. The Royal Canadian Navy on the other hand, does not wear dress uniforms similar to the Royal Navy anymore. In addition to the dress uniforms that is more similar to the U.S. Navy, the traditional sailor suit is no longer worn and some distinctly Canadian rank insignia and titles are used; e.g., master sailor.

== History ==
=== Officers ===
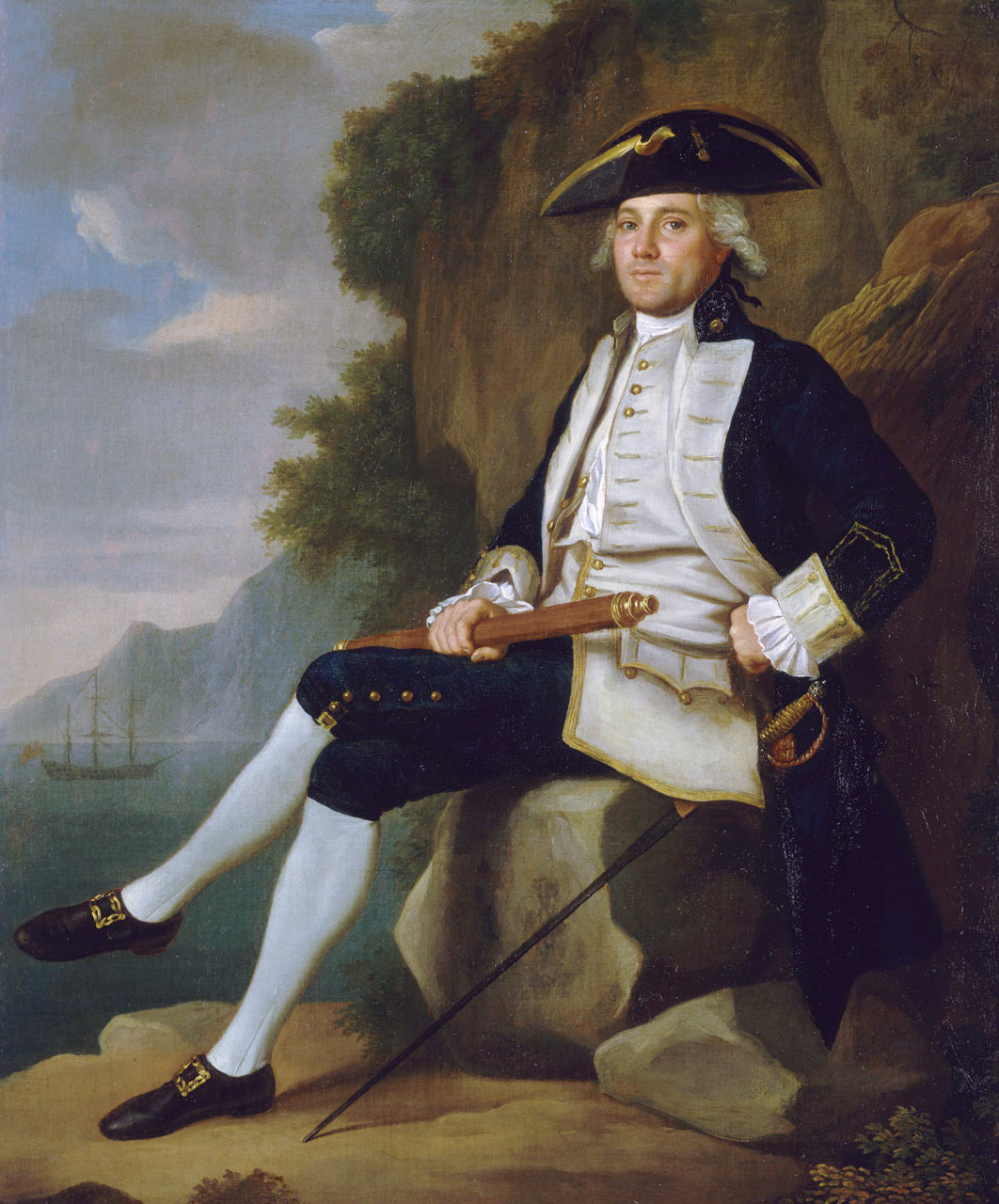
Captain Edward Vernon (1723–1794)

Uniform regulations for officers were first issued by Lord Anson in 1748, and remained unchanged for nearly twenty years. Reportedly, the officers themselves advocated its adoption, as they "wished to be recognised as being in the service of the Crown." The "best uniform", consisting of an embroidered blue coat with white facings, worn unbuttoned with white breeches and stockings, was worn for ceremonial occasions; the "working rig" was a simpler, less embroidered uniform for day-to-day use. In 1767 the best uniform was abolished and replaced by the working rig, with a simpler "undress" uniform for day-to-day use. By 1795, as a result of the French Revolutionary Wars, a plain blue "undress" coat had been introduced for everyday use, and epaulettes were officially introduced. By 1846, all officers wore epaulettes. The white facings came and went over the years, briefly becoming scarlet (1830-1843). Though stripes of lace on the cuffs had been used to distinguish the different ranks of admiral since 1795, the first version of current rank insignia, consisting of stripes with a "curl" in the top one, was introduced for all officers in 1856.

In 1825, the white breeches were replaced by trousers for officers serving in the United Kingdom, although the practice of wearing white trousers with naval uniforms (popularly known as "Wei-Wei Rig") continued for officers serving overseas (e.g. in the West Indies and China) until 1939. Throughout the nineteenth century, there was great variation; officers paid for their own uniforms, and often adapted it to fit civilian fashion of the time, as the Admiralty regulations were not highly prescriptive.

For service in tropical climates, a white tunic and trousers were introduced in 1877. During World War II, a blue working dress on the lines of battledress was approved. Until 1956, caps were worn with white covers in summer months, and a thicker black cover in the winter, before the white cap became standard all year round. This was partially reversed in 2021 for Royal Navy submarine officers only who, along with submarine qualified ratings, were authorised to wear caps with a black cover rather than white, year-round.

The distinctive white collar patch of the midshipman first appeared in 1758.

=== Ratings ===
Uniform for ratings was first established in 1857. Prior to this, most seamen wore "slops", or ready-made clothing sold to the ship's crew by a contractor; many captains established general standards of appearance for the seamen on their vessel, but there was little or no uniformity between ships. On one occasion in 1853, the commanding officer of HMS Harlequin paid for his boat crews to dress as harlequins, an incident which may have contributed to the Admiralty's decision to adopt a standard uniform.

A number of changes have been introduced since the introduction of the first rating uniform, notably the removal of the blue jacket in 1890, and the replacement of bell-bottoms by flared trousers in 1977. In 1997 there was a major standardisation programme, meaning that all ratings now wear the same ceremonial uniform for the first time in history.

== Present-day uniforms ==
Present-day Royal Navy officers and ratings have several different uniforms; some are blue, others are white.

=== Officers ===
==== Ceremonial Day Dress ====
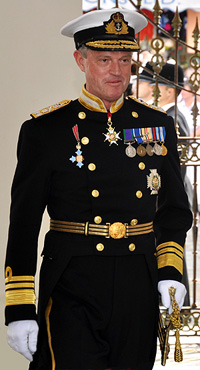
Ceremonial Day Dress, as worn by Vice-Admiral Sir Adrian Johns

This is worn only by a few senior Officers (Admirals and Admirals of the Fleet, members of the Royal Family or Royal Household of Flag Rank, and the Vice-Admiral of the United Kingdom). In addition, in the past several members of the Royal Family below flag rank, most notably King Charles III and Andrew, the then Duke of York, wore this uniform whilst holding the ranks of commander and captain. It consists of a navy blue double-breasted tailcoat with standing collar faced white with gold edging, worn with gold shoulder boards, and gold laced blue trousers. Officers of the rank of Admiral of the Fleet, and also officers holding the appointments of First Sea Lord, Chief of the Defence Staff or the Defence Services Secretary (if a naval officer) wear a full dress sword belt embroidered with oak leaves; others wear a full dress sword belt with three stripes. It is worn at parades such as Lord High Admiral's Divisions (BRNC) or at state occasions. Introduced in 1960, it is essentially the same Full Dress uniform worn for ceremonial occasions before that date only with the cocked hat replaced by the peaked hat and the epaulettes replaced by shoulder boards, and without the cuff slash and gold lace on the rear pockets. The ceremonial day coats worn by women button up the opposite way, and the tricorn hat is worn instead of the peaked cap (as worn by Anne, Princess Royal).

==== No. 1 dress ====
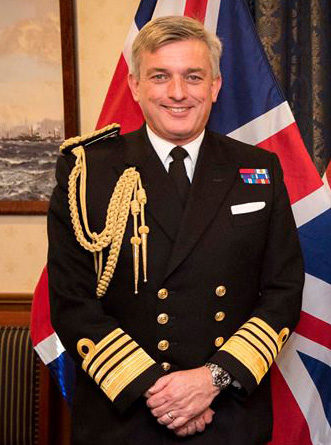
Blue No. 1C dress (with aiguillette) worn by Sir Philip Jones.

This is the formal uniform worn on ceremonial occasions. For all commissioned officers it consists of a double-breasted, navy blue reefer jacket with four rows of two buttons, matching trousers, white shirt, black tie, peaked cap, black socks, and black leather shoes. It is divided into 1A (with medals and bearing arms), 1B (same as 1A, but without arms), and 1C (with medal ribbons). Female personnel may wear skirts except when carrying a sword or rifle. It was originally introduced in 1889 and was initially known as the "undress coat".

==== No. 2 dress ====
This mess dress is worn in the evenings for dining. 2A is the formal evening dress for ceremonial dinners; it consists of a navy blue mess jacket with a white waistcoat (black cummerbund for female officers) with miniature medals. For officers of the rank of captain and above, a navy blue tailcoat (known as an "undress tailcoat") may optionally be worn in lieu of the mess jacket. For officers of these ranks, in addition, gold-laced trousers (known informally as "lightning conductors") may also be optionally worn either with the tailcoat or the mess jacket. 2B is "mess undress" for other mess functions, and is worn with either a black cummerbund or navy blue waistcoat and miniature medals. 2C, "red sea rig", is worn for informal evening wear on board ship; it consists of a white short sleeved shirt, worn with shoulder boards, without medals and with black trousers, black shoes and a black cummerbund.

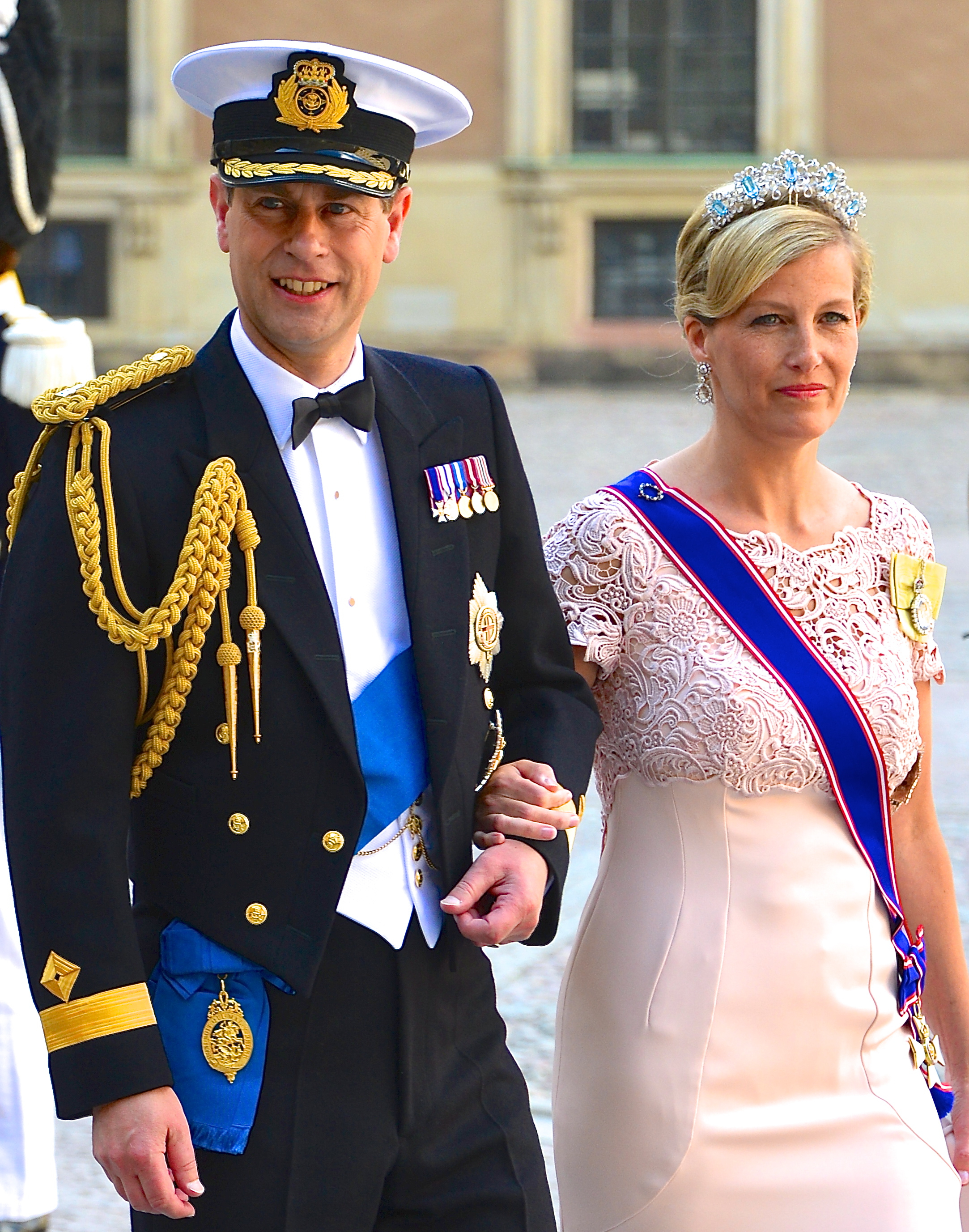
No. 2A dress, as worn by Prince Edward, Earl of Wessex

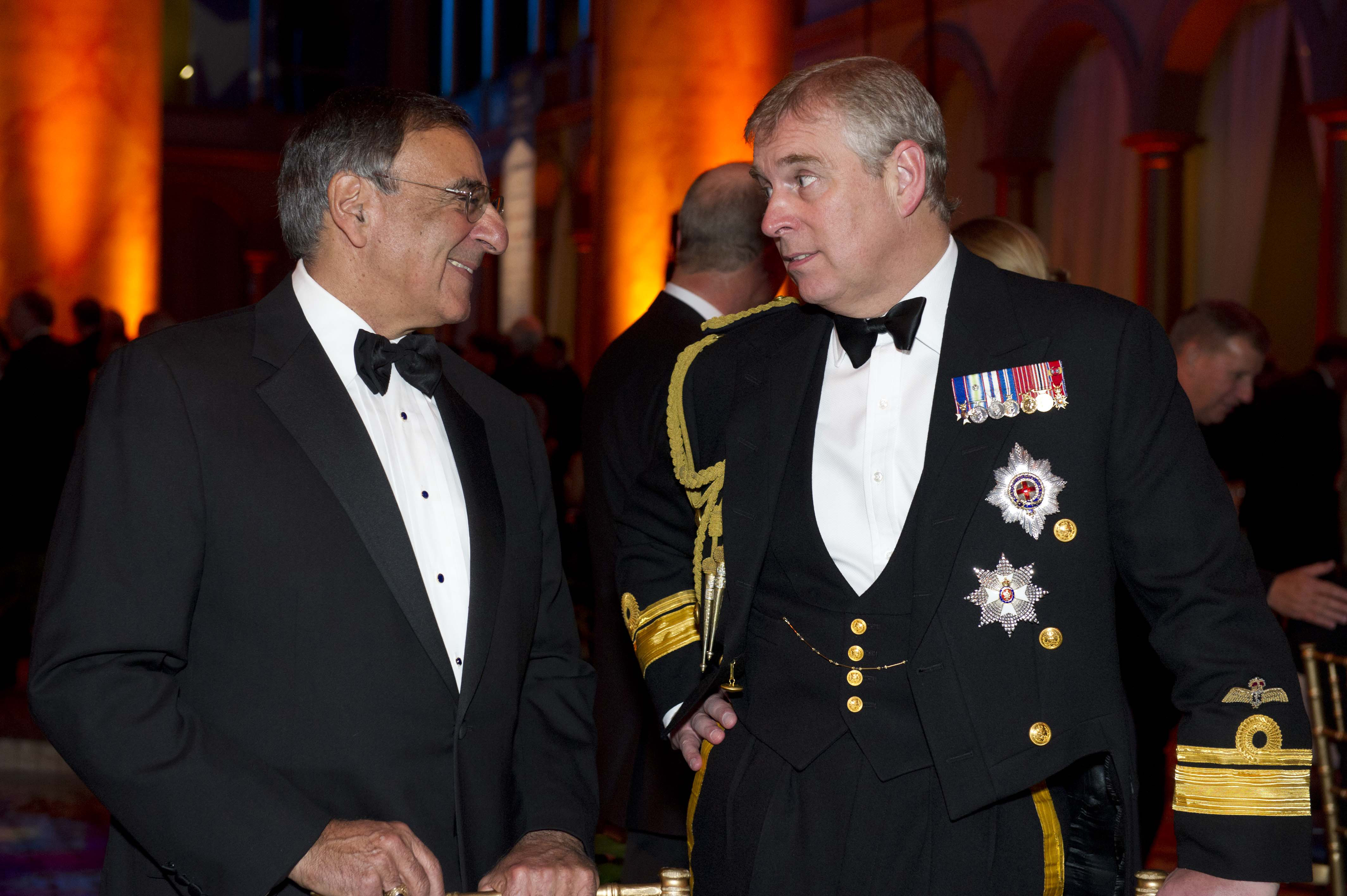
Blue No. 2B dress (tailcoat option), as worn by then-Rear-Admiral Prince Andrew, Duke of York (right)

==== No. 3 dress ====
No. 3 dress

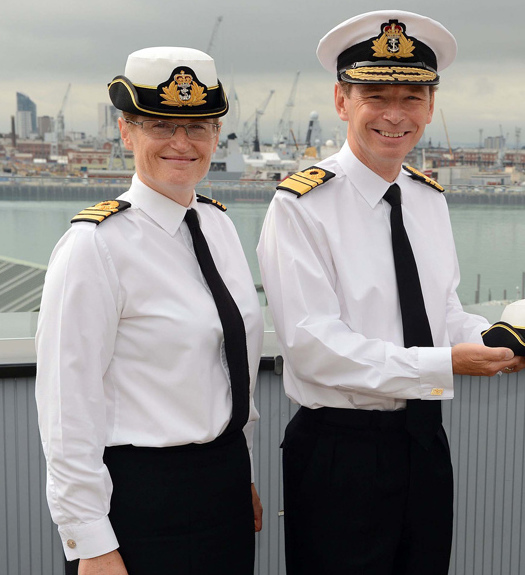
3A dress

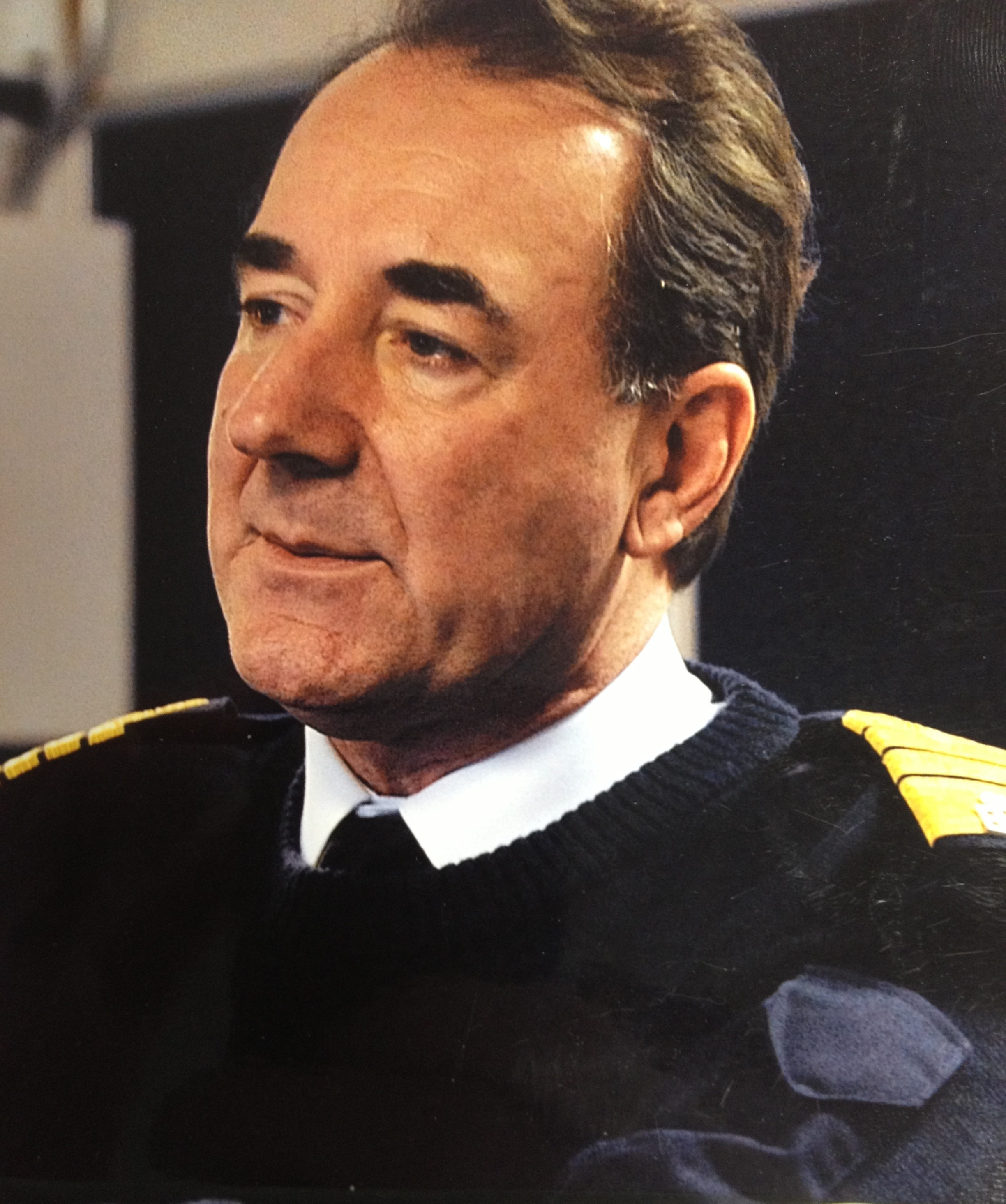
3C dress

This is worn all year round for general duties. It consists of a white shirt with rank insignia on the shoulders, and appropriate headgear. For officers 3A dress includes a long-sleeved shirt and tie, while 3B includes a short-sleeved shirt but without the tie. 3C is the same in all respects as 3A but with the addition of a navy blue thermal jacket, which replaced the woollen jersey (which may still be worn by personal choice). Shoulder boards may also be worn with 3B dress. The beret may be worn with this dress only on certain occasions or by certain organisations (for example, members of FOST).

==== No. 4 dress (RIG22 Dress) ====
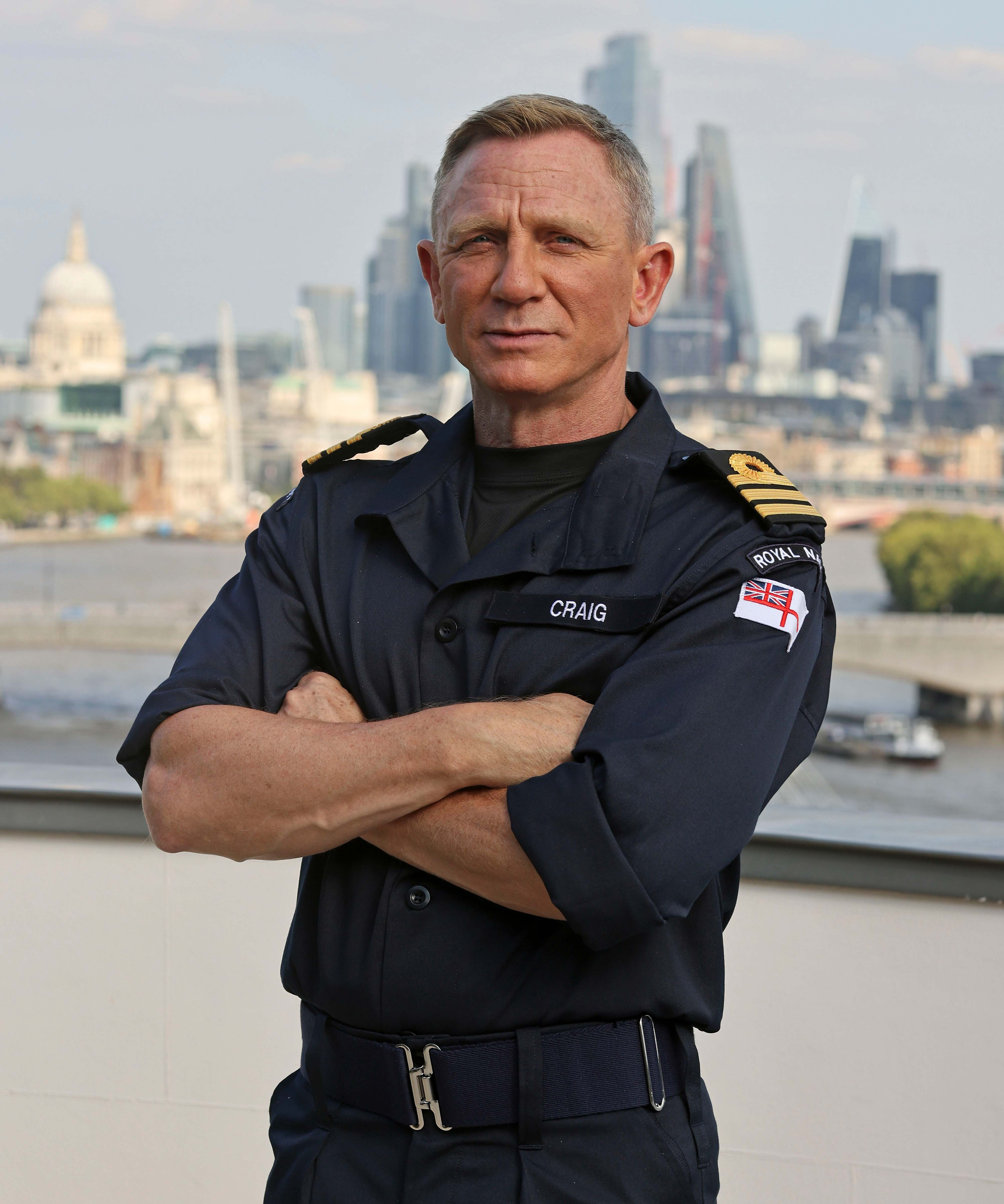
Royal Navy RIG22 uniform, as worn by Honorary Commander Daniel Craig. Note old-style stable belt, narrow name tape and sewn Ensign.

The current Daily Working Rig and Action Working Dress (AWD) of the Royal Navy is RIG22, which was adopted Navy-wide in 2022, though roll-out and full issue was not complete in some areas until early 2026. The term "No. 4 Dress" is no longer used in Naval publications, or in day-to-day parlance.

RIG22 consists of a navy blue fire-retardant buttoned shirt, with a removable Velcro-backed name tape and rank insignia on the shoulders, (worn tucked in and with the sleeves rolled up or down depending on operational requirements and environmental conditions), navy blue beret, navy blue stable belt, navy blue fire-retardant trousers, black safety "steaming" boots (when at sea – combat boots may be worn ashore, or for boarding parties), and a black moisture-wicking T-shirt. Officers do not wear branch or specialisation badges. It also includes an optional inner thermal and a Gore-Tex outer jacket, which may be worn together or separately, and which retain the rank insignia placement on the centre chest from RNPCS.

RIG22 Relaxed is the optional relaxed version of RIG22 when at sea or in extremely hot conditions (>29 degrees Celsius), and consists of the RIG22 uniform but with the shirt either untucked or fully relaxed (removed). The peaked cap is worn with RIG22 for certain ceremonial occasions such as sunset ceremonies, guard duty, or entering and leaving harbour.

RIG22 was introduced as part of a £78 million programme to modernise Royal Navy uniforms and provide a uniform that was more comfortable in warmer climates, and is intended to be improved and iterated as requirements change. It replaced the Royal Navy Personal Clothing System (RNPCS) which was in service from 2015, which in turn replaced the old No. 4 (previously No. 8) Action Working Dress, which had been in service, with minor alterations, since the Second World War. Subsequent changes to the uniform (informally dubbed "RIG24") include a velcro-backed White Ensign on the sleeve as opposed to the previous sewn-on version, a broader name-tape, and narrower belt-loops on the trousers, with an accompanying thinner stable belt.

RIG22 is worn by all ranks and rates.

==== No. 5 dress ====
No. 5 refers to the wide range of job-specific working kit worn by different personnel (e.g. medical, flight deck, boat crews, chefs, divers, etc.) for particular tasks. They are worn as required for duties. Included in this category is the Multi-Terrain Pattern (MTP) PCS (personal clothing system) uniform.

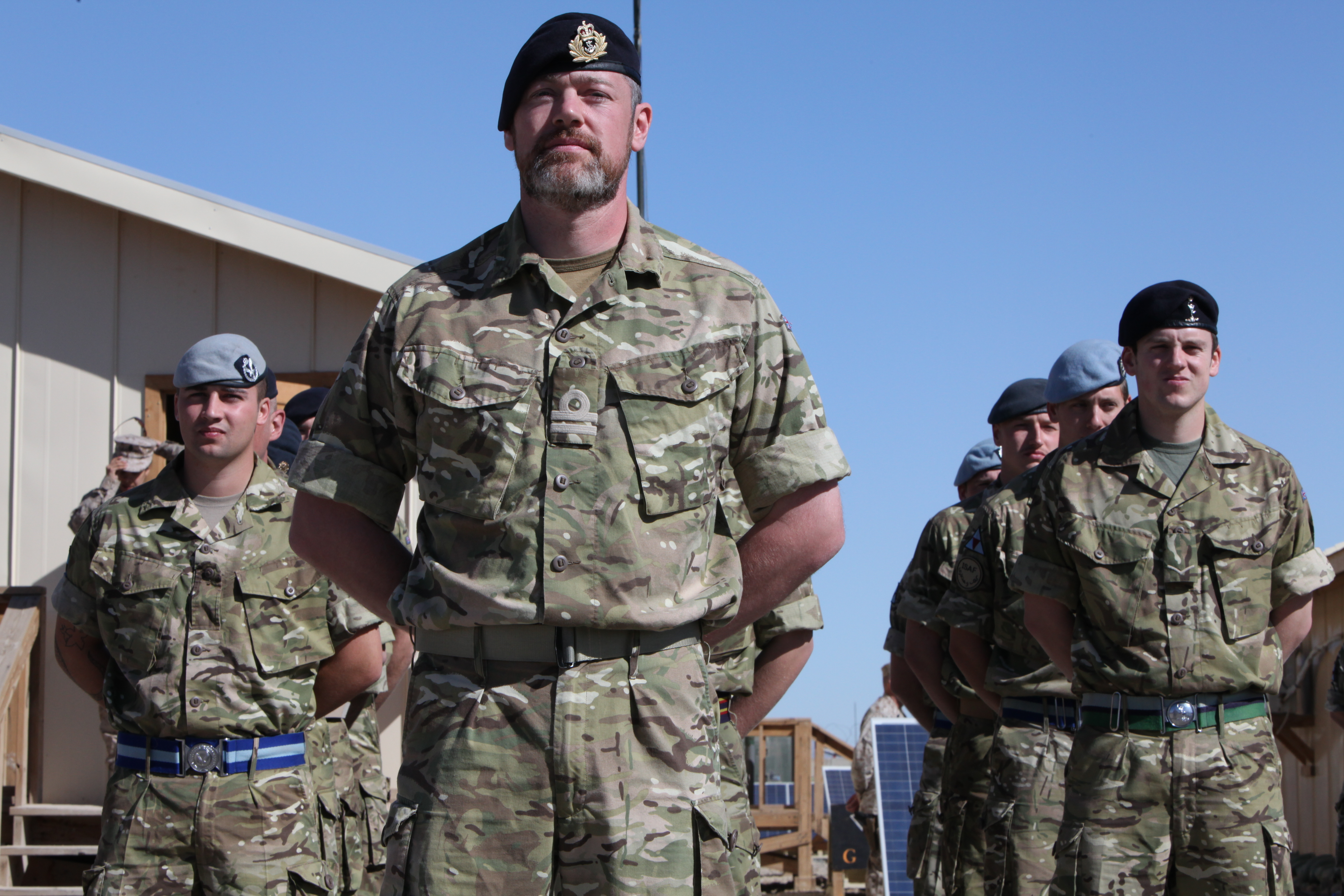
A Royal Navy officer wearing Multi-Terrain Pattern (MTP) as No. 5 dress, with a beret. This can include a stable belt.

==== White uniforms ====
In the tropics on formal occasions officers wear a short sleeved white bush jacket with an open collar and shoulder boards, matching trousers, peaked cap and white leather shoes. Like temperate number 1 dress, it is divided into three categories: 1WA (with medals and when bearing arms), 1WB (with medals but when not bearing arms), and 1WC (with medal ribbons rather than medals and when not bearing arms.)

Officers above the rank of commander, and those holding certain appointments, may optionally wear instead a long-sleeved, high-necked white tunic, with five buttons down the front, worn with white trousers and white shoes. Other officers may be instructed to wear this uniform "when required to conform with accepted international standards of dress on state or major ceremonial occasions".

There is also a white version of No. 2 dress; gold-laced navy blue trousers may be optionally worn with white No. 2 dress by officers of the rank of captain and above.

White No. 3 dress is the same as 3B dress, but is worn with white trousers, socks, and shoes in place of the black versions normally worn. White number 3B and 3C uniforms have been abolished. They consisted of a white short sleeve shirt and white shorts; 3B was worn with long white socks and white shoes, while 3C was worn with boat shoes. Both white 3B and white 3C dress have been replaced by the new number 4 RNPCS dress.

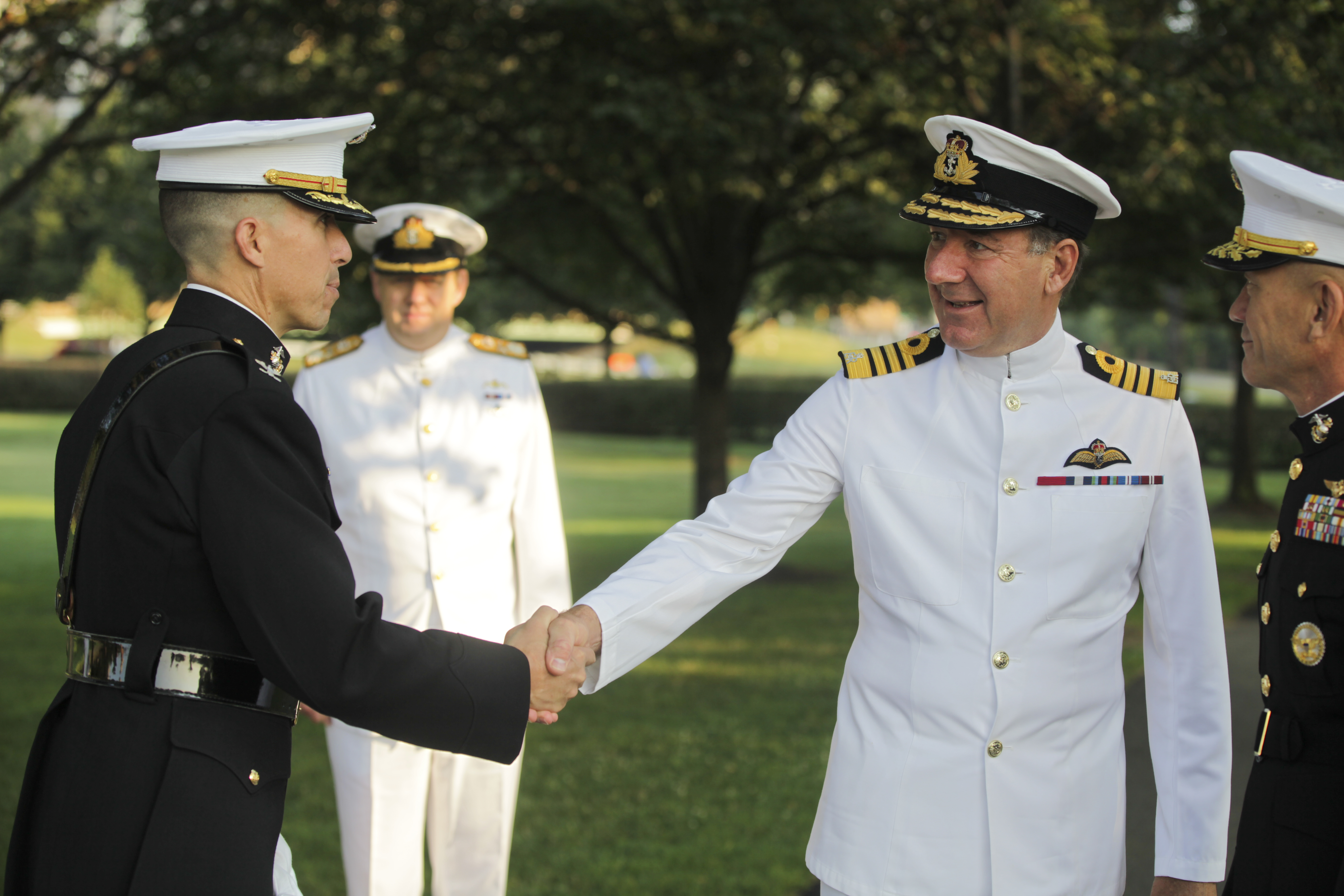
Admiral Sir George Zambellas wearing No. 1WC White ceremonial dress (white tunic option)

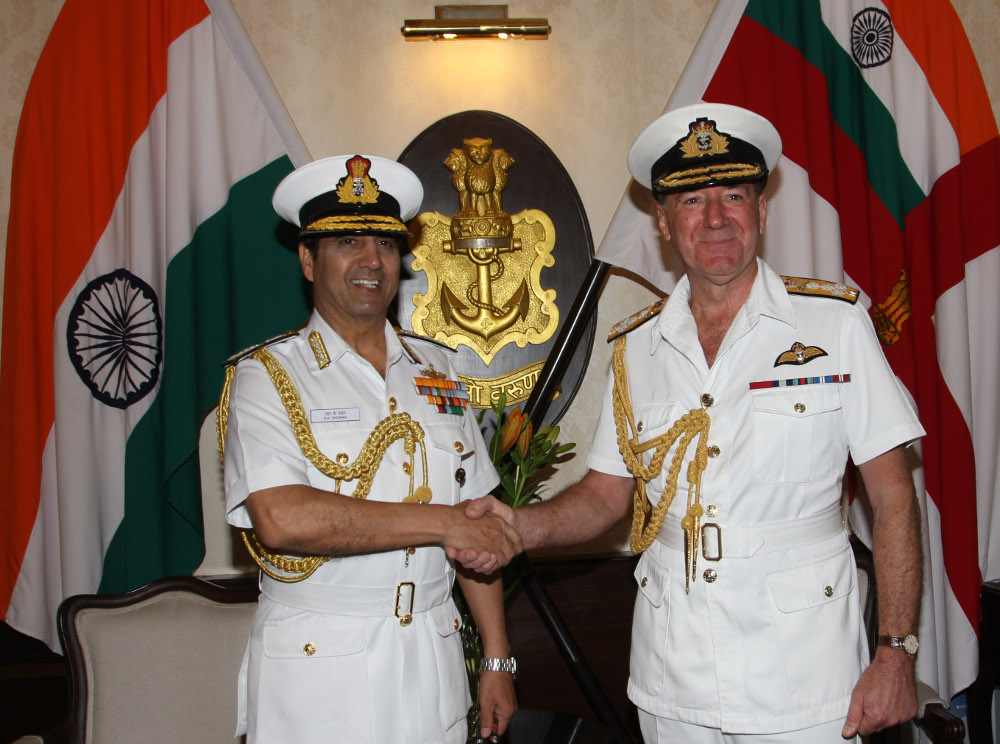
Admiral Sir George Zambellas (right) in White No. 1WC dress (bush jacket option)

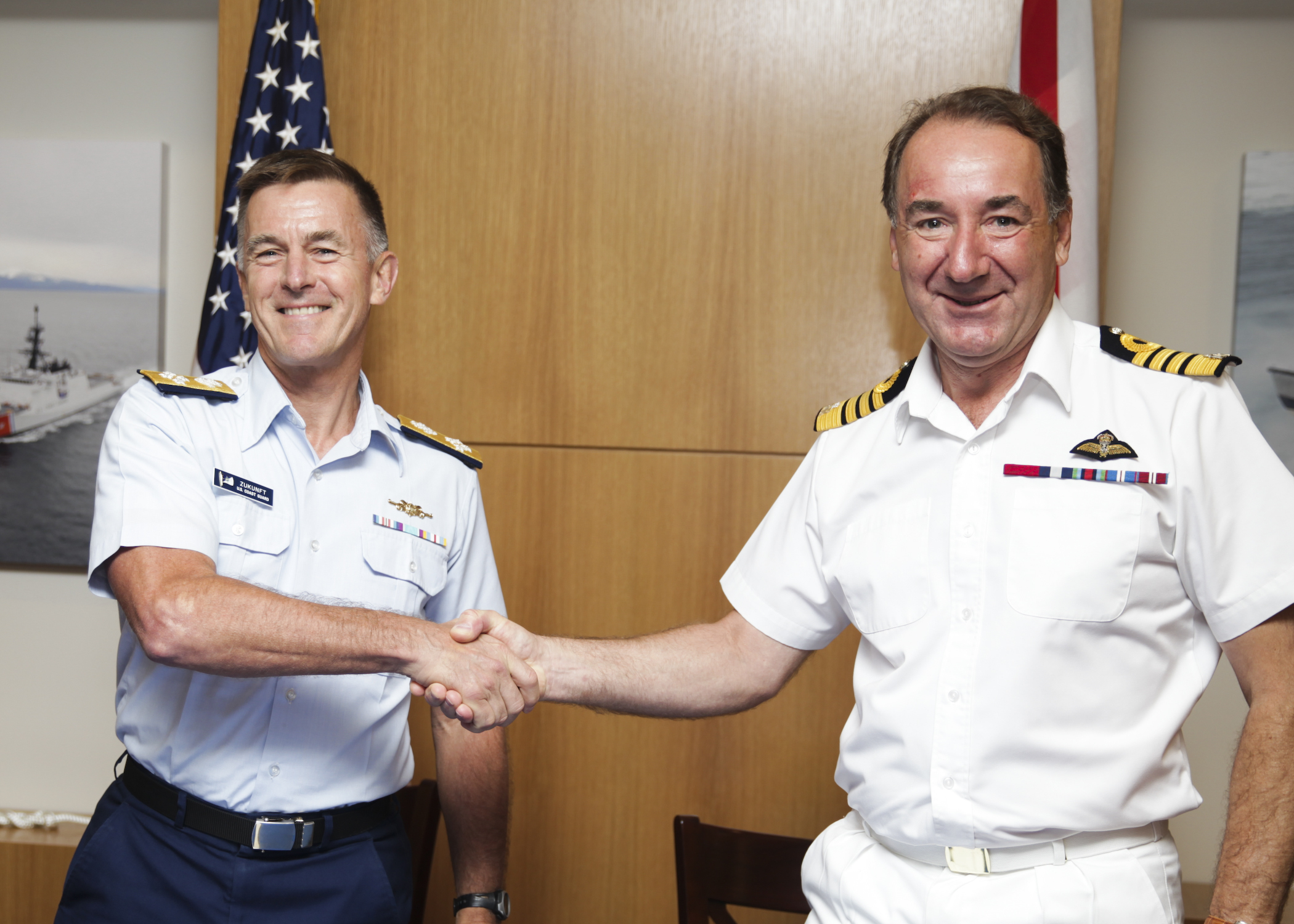
Admiral Sir George Zambellas wearing white No. 3WA dress.

=== Senior ratings ===
==== No. 1 dress ====
For senior rates, petty officer and above, No. 1 Dress consists of a double-breasted jacket similar to that worn by commissioned officers but with only six buttons. Historically, this was originally known as the "long jacket", and was first introduced for engine room artificers, masters-at-arms, and schoolmasters. Later, its use was extended to all Chief Petty Officers (1879) and Petty Officers (1920). Relevant rate insignia is worn on the left arm of the jacket by petty officers. Like their counterparts as worn by commissioned officers, it is divided into 1A (armed and with medals) 1B (with medals only) and 1C dress (with medals ribbons) In 1A dress, when armed, a white web belt and white gaiters are worn by senior ratings as they are by junior ratings. WO1s wear a sword and sword belt with 1A dress. However this differs from that worn by commissioned officers in that it has a black grip instead of a white one, and it has a plain stepped pommel instead of the officers' lion mane one.

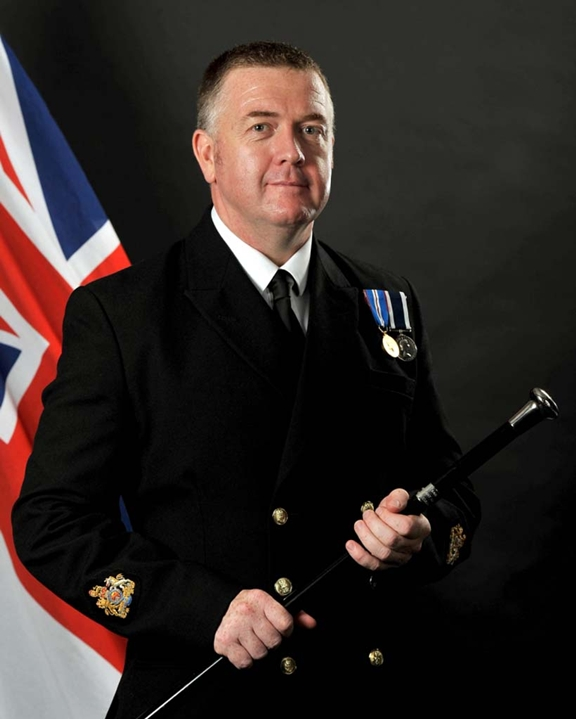
No. 1 dress, as worn by senior ratings, worn by Steve Cass, former Warrant Officer of the Naval Service

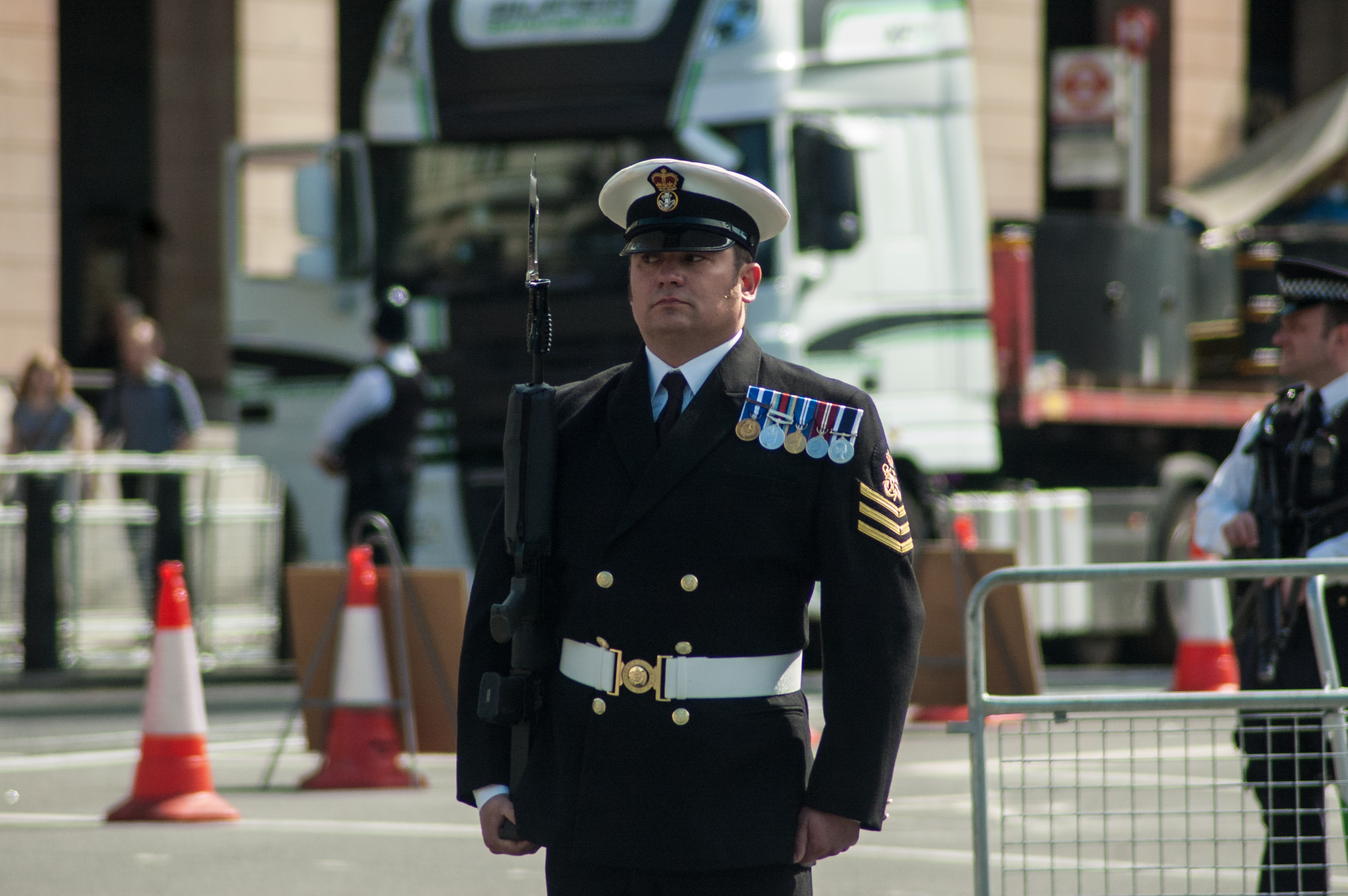
No. 1A dress, as worn by a petty officer

==== No. 2 dress ====
This mess undress is optional wear in the evenings for dining by all senior rates and warrant officers. It is worn with a black cummerbund and miniature medals. The cut of the jacket is different from that worn by officers: it is double breasted, but features a shawl collar and only four buttons instead of six. Trade badges and other non-substantive badges are not worn on the mess jacket, but cuff buttons and substantive rate badges are. This is worn with plain blue mess trousers and (optionally) the peaked cap. Those senior ratings who have not applied for mess dress for 2B dress may instead wear 1C dress with a black bow tie substituted for the black straight tie.

==== No. 3 dress ====
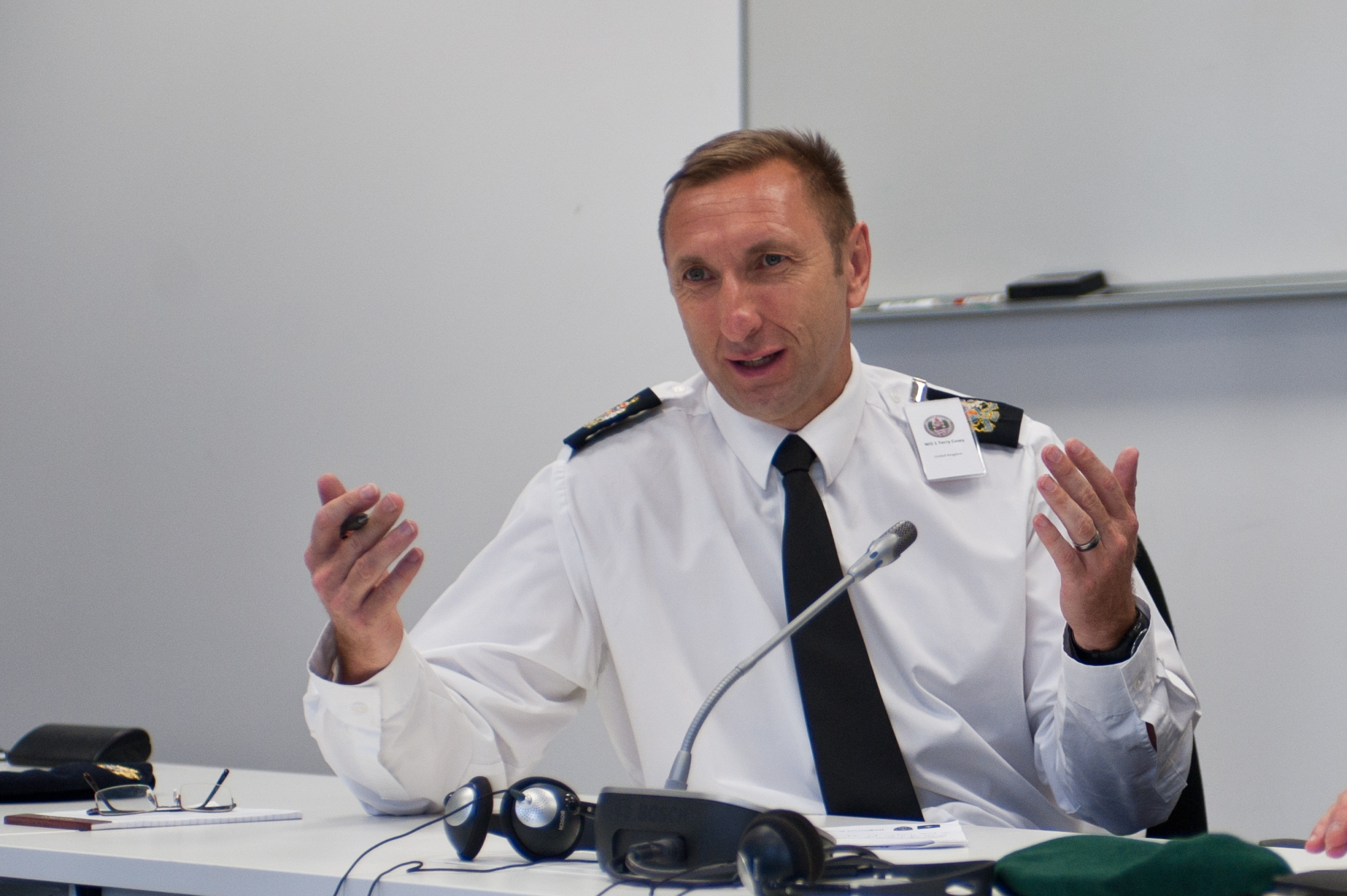
No. 3A dress, as worn by former Warrant Officer of the Naval Service WO1 Terry Casey.

This is the same as the various types of number 3 dress as worn by commissioned officers. Senior ratings wear shoulder rank slides with 3A, 3B and 3C but WO1s may optionally wear shoulder boards with 3A and 3C dress.

==== No. 4 dress/ RIG22 ====
Senior ratings currently wear the RIG22 dress.

==== White uniforms ====
These are the same as the white uniforms currently worn by commissioned officers. As with commissioned officers, a white tunic may be worn with 1AW dress and 1BW dress when "required to conform with accepted international standards of dress on state or major ceremonial occasions", but the white tunic worn by senior rates differs from that of commissioned officers in that it only has four buttons rather than five and does not feature shoulder boards nor fittings for them. Petty officers wear blue on white versions of their substantive rate, trade, and good conduct badges with the tunic, Chief Petty Officers wear their cuff buttons and a gold on blue trade badge above the right cuff, and Warrant officers wear gold on white versions of their sleeve rank badges.

Medals and rate shoulder badges only are worn with the bush jacket. WO1s may wear optional shoulder boards with the bush jacket as well. When armed, senior ratings wear white gaiters and white webbing belts, as with the blue version.

=== Junior ratings ===
==== No. 1 dress ====
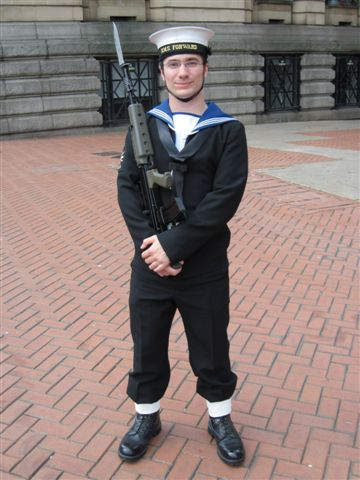
A rating in 1A uniform.

The No. 1 uniform worn by junior ratings, known as "square rig", has changed little since it was first introduced in 1857. It consists of a white undershirt, a navy jumper, navy bell bottoms, a square blue collar with white stripes, a black silk scarf, a white lanyard (now decorative, but originally used to secure a knife), and a peakless cap encircled by a "tally" or ribbon bearing the name of the rating's ship. It was worn as working dress until after the Second World War, but is now worn only on ceremonial occasions.

1C uniform includes medal ribbons; 1B uniform includes medals; and 1A uniform, worn when carrying rifles, includes a white web belt and gaiters, in addition to medals.

==== No. 2 dress ====
Mess dress is not worn by junior ratings but 1C dress is worn instead. 2C, "red sea rig", is worn for informal evening wear on board ship. However, the black cummerbund is not worn by junior ratings in this rig.

==== No. 3 dress ====
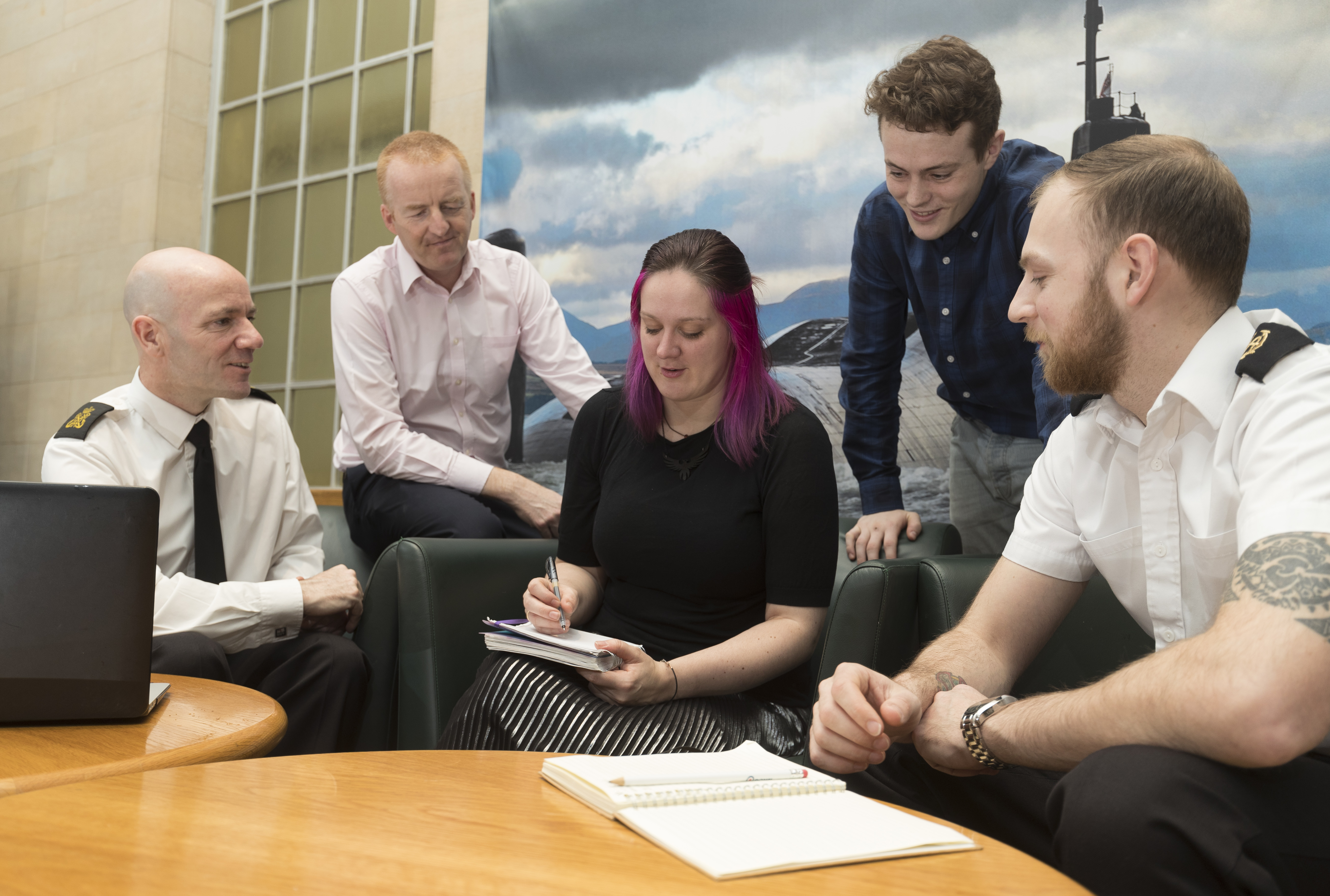
A Petty Officer (left) and Leading rating (right) wearing 3A and 3C dress respectively

This is the same as for Officer's No. 3 dress but with the relevant rate insignia and seaman's cap (or beret). Junior rates are only issued with short-sleeve shirts and are not issued with ties. Thus No. 3 dress is divided into 3B (without jersey) and 3C dress (navy blue jersey worn over the shirt with the shirt collar out). There is no equivalent of 3A dress for junior ratings.

==== No. 4 dress/ RIG22 ====
Junior ratings, in common with all ranks and rates of the Royal Navy, are currently issued the new RIG22 uniform. Specialist badges are worn on the shirt sleeves; each branch and specialisation has its own insignia and are to be worn accordingly.

==== No. 5 dress ====
No. 5 is the collective category for all specialist working uniforms. They are worn as required for duties. These include overalls, dry and wet suits, physical training uniform, and dental and medical scrubs. Included in this category as well is the Multi-Terrain Pattern (MTP) PCS (personal clothing system) uniform.

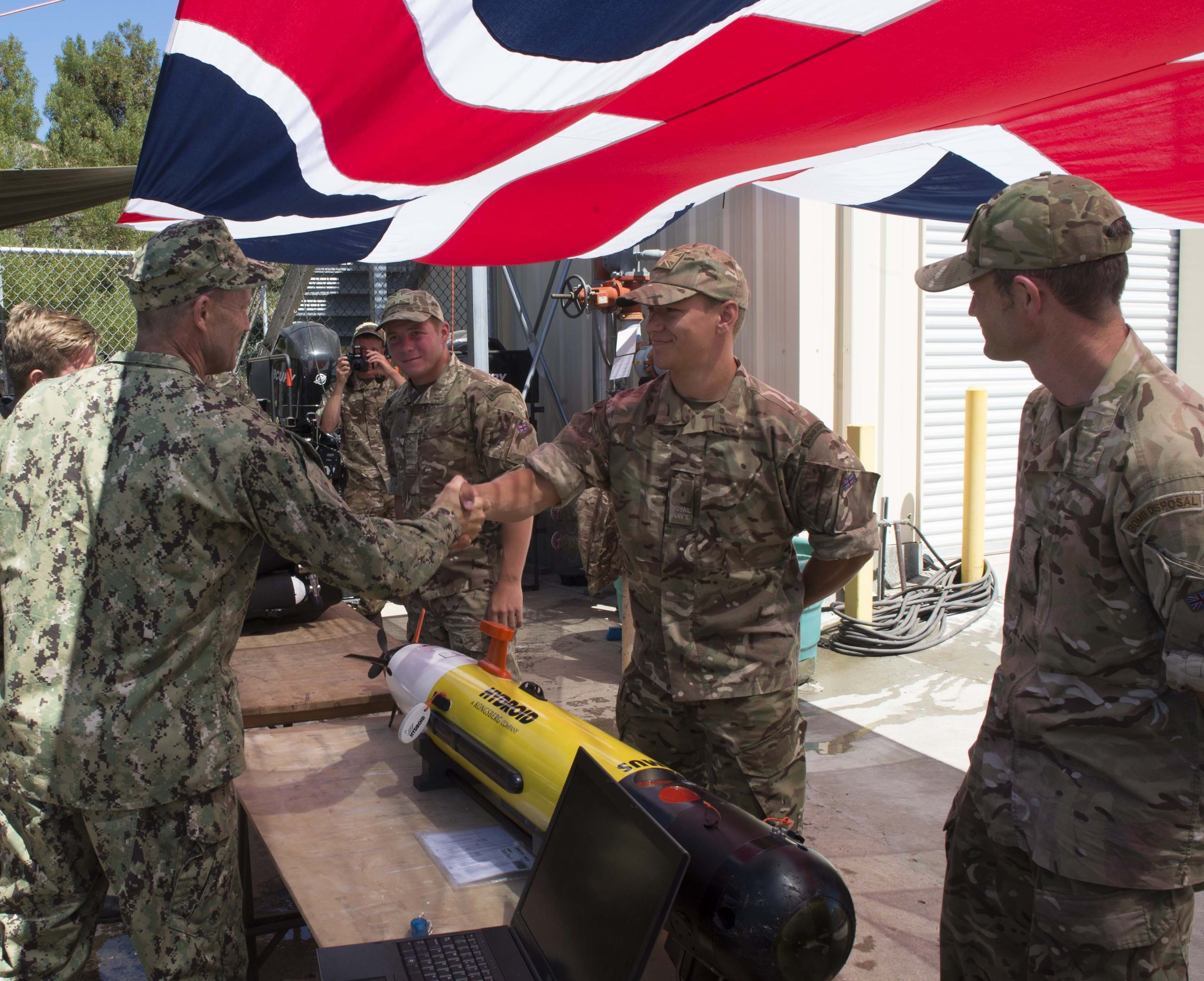
Junior ratings wearing Multi-Terrain Pattern as No. 5 dress

==== White uniforms ====
For junior ratings, the white warm climate No. 1 dress is a white version of the traditional sailor's suit. The white warm climate versions of No. 2 and No. 3 dress are the same for the counterparts worn by officers and senior rates. However, only short-sleeved shirts are issued and worn and ties are not worn by junior ratings in these rigs.

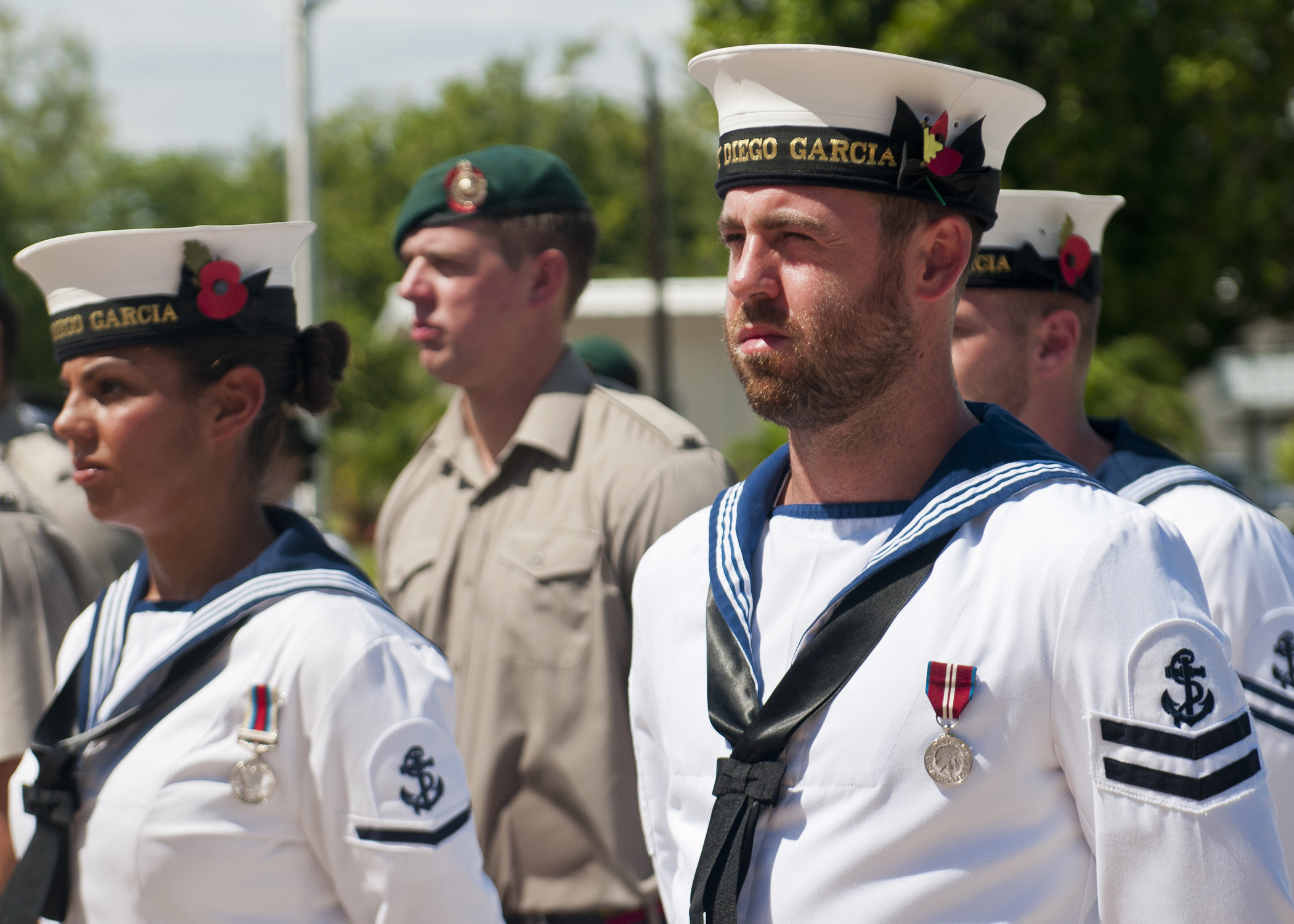
1AW dress, as worn by three leading ratings.

== Obsolete uniforms ==
=== Full Dress ===
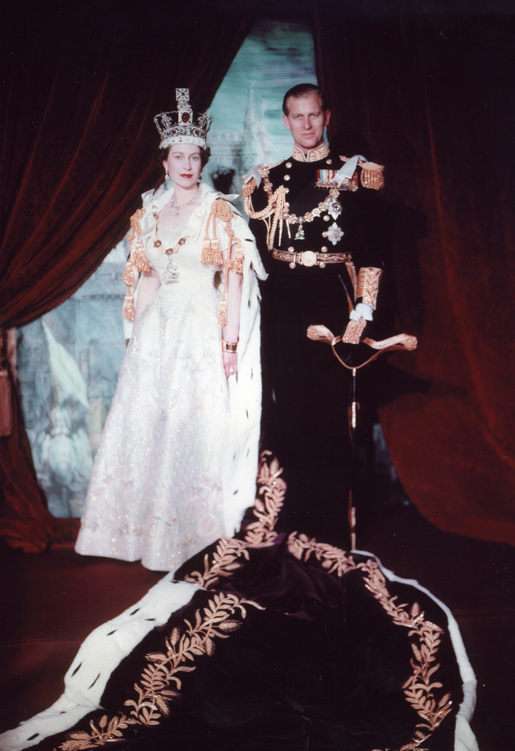
Full Dress, as worn by Admiral of the Fleet The Duke of Edinburgh for the Coronation of Queen Elizabeth II in 1953.

Introduced in its ultimate form in 1827, but had steadily evolved from the undress uniform introduced in 1748; this uniform was worn by all commissioned officers from sub-lieutenant upwards, as well as warrant officers. It consisted of a blue double-breasted tailcoat with eight gold buttons worn with blue trousers with gold lace down the side, bicorn hat, sword belt and sword with scabbard, and gold epaulettes (gold 'scales' were worn by sub-lieutenants and neither epaulettes nor scales were worn by warrant officers). It was placed "in abeyance" (i.e. not used but not abolished) in January 1916 until the end of the First World War. It was restricted between the world wars to court levees. On all other ceremonial occasions, Frock Coat (with epaulettes) was prescribed. In July 1930, officers of the rank of commander and above were required to provide themselves with Full Dress.

It was again declared in abeyance with the outbreak of war in 1939, but was not formally abolished. Used on several ceremonial occasions after the war (such as the coronation of Elizabeth II), it was replaced with the current Ceremonial Day Dress in 1960. A version of Royal Navy Full Dress, complete with epaulettes and cocked hat, is still worn by the Lord Warden of the Cinque Ports, but the current holder of that office, (Admiral Sir George Zambellas), wears his Royal Navy ceremonial day coat in lieu of this, as did his predecessor, Lord Boyce. It was last worn by Sir Robert Menzies during his tenure as Lord Warden from 1966 to 1978.

=== Round jacket ===
Colloquially known as "the jacket", this was originally a more practical "working" version of the full dress coat that was improvised by officers cutting off the tails of a spare undress coat. This practice was already informally widespread amongst officers at sea but in the 1825 regulations, the round jacket was finally given official sanction. It was only worn at sea, and was worn with either a peaked cap or a round (similar to a top) hat. After the Frock Coat was introduced, it became fashionable among officers to wear either the round jacket or the undress tailcoat as evening wear, an unofficial but common practice that finally became regularised in 1891, when the round jacket became the mess jacket that is still worn today in mess dress and mess undress. Cadets and Midshipmen still wore their (single-breasted) version of the round jacket for formal occasions until that particular garment was discontinued in the 1950s.

=== Frock Coat Dress ===
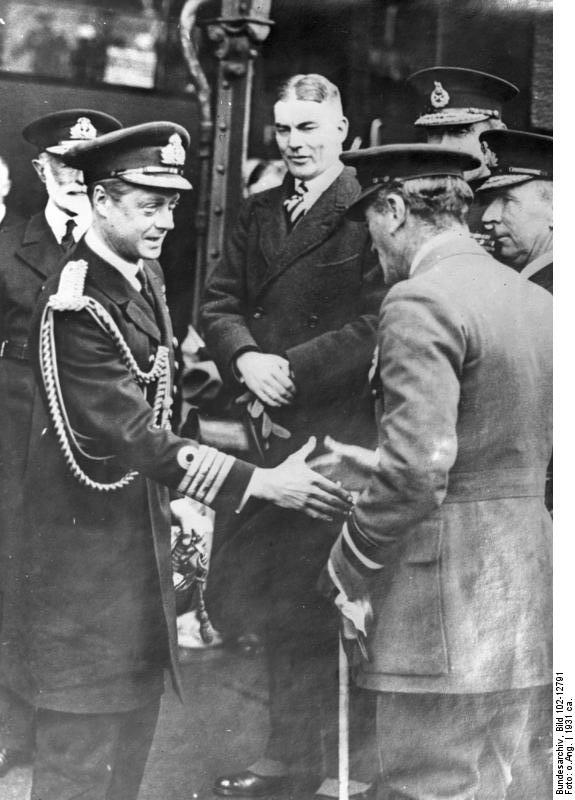
Frock Coat Dress (without epaulettes), worn by Edward, Prince of Wales as Captain, later King Edward VIII and Duke of Windsor, in 1931.

This was introduced in 1847 and was divided into several categories: Frock Coat with epaulettes; which was worn with the bicorn hat and medals, Frock Coat without epaulettes, which was worn with the peaked cap. It became official "working dress" in 1858. It was altered in 1933 by having only four buttons (instead of five) each side, three of which were to be buttoned. This enabled longer lapels to be incorporated, reflecting civilian fashions of the time. Frock Coat Dress was (like Full Dress) placed in abeyance and "landed" in 1939, and although not formally abolished was not worn until it was finally abolished in 1949. A modified version of this uniform is still worn, usually with peaked cap and without epaulettes, by the Master and Elder Brethren of Trinity House. Uniquely, Masters at Arms in the Royal Navy wore a single-breasted version of the Frock coat, that was discontinued in the 1950s.

=== Battledress ===
This was not introduced until comparatively late in World War II, in contrast to its Army and RAF equivalents. From 1941, Army battledress was approved for use by Royal Navy personnel until 1943, when a Navy Blue version of battledress was introduced to be used only by the Royal Navy. Battledress stock from WW2 was still being worn at BRNC Dartmouth until the late 1980s. It was used as a formal ceremonial uniform until those officers received their bespoke tailored outfits towards the end of training.

=== No. 8 / No. 4 Action Working Dress ===
The working uniform introduced after the Second World War, and was only fully phased out by RNPCS in 2025 for Sea Cadet units. This uniform was composed of a light blue, collared shirt for all ranks and rates, with or without a Navy blue pullover, dark blue trousers and steaming boots. Headgear was normally a Navy blue beret with a metal badge, but caps were also worn with this dress for ceremonial functions. Rank was worn on slides on shoulder straps of shirt of pullover by all ranks. Originally cotton, poly-cotton versions had become the norm by the 1982 Falklands War, resulting in serious injuries and disfigurement when the polyester melted when exposed to the extreme heat of burning vessels, and leading to reform of clothing standards. The No. 4 uniform that replaced No. 8 AWD was referred to as "Improved Action Work Dress" due to its fire-retardant properties, but was visually identical.

=== RNPCS ===
RNPCS was introduced in 2015 as the Royal Navy's first new uniform design in seventy years, replacing the No. 4 AWD Navy-wide – although some units such as URNU and Sea Cadets did not transition for some years after that date. It consisted of a dark blue flame-retardant zippered shirt with rank displayed on a chest slide, dark blue fire-retardant trousers and stable belt, steaming boots, and beret (with peaked cap worn for ceremonial functions). As with the No. 4 uniform, a blue cotton T-shirt was worn underneath the shirt, and could be replaced with unit specific T-shirts as authorised by unit commands. RNPCS continues to be worn by Sea Cadet and URNU units, given that many have only recently changed over from No. 4s.

=== Others ===
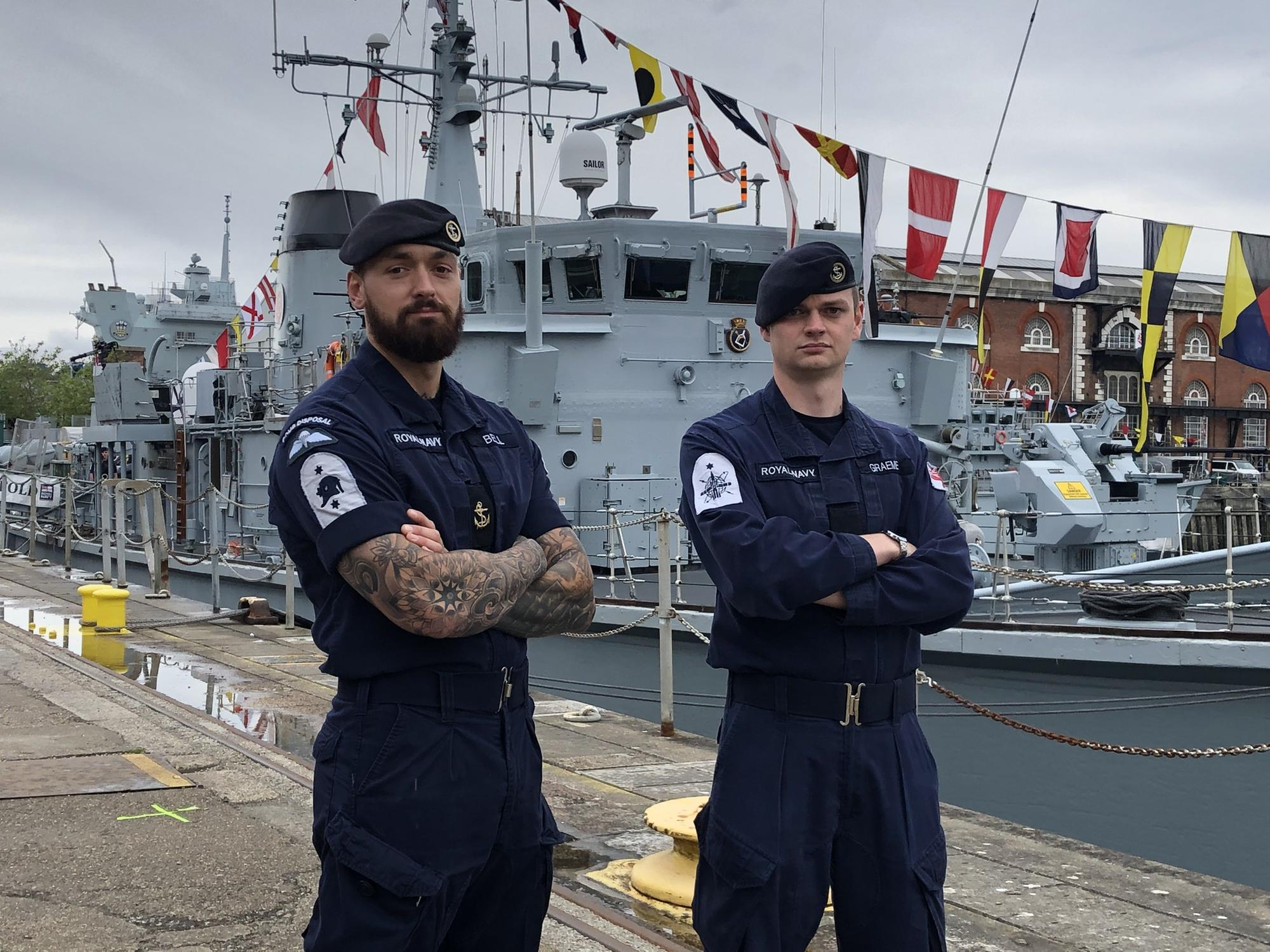
Ratings wearing the RNPCS uniform with branch badges.

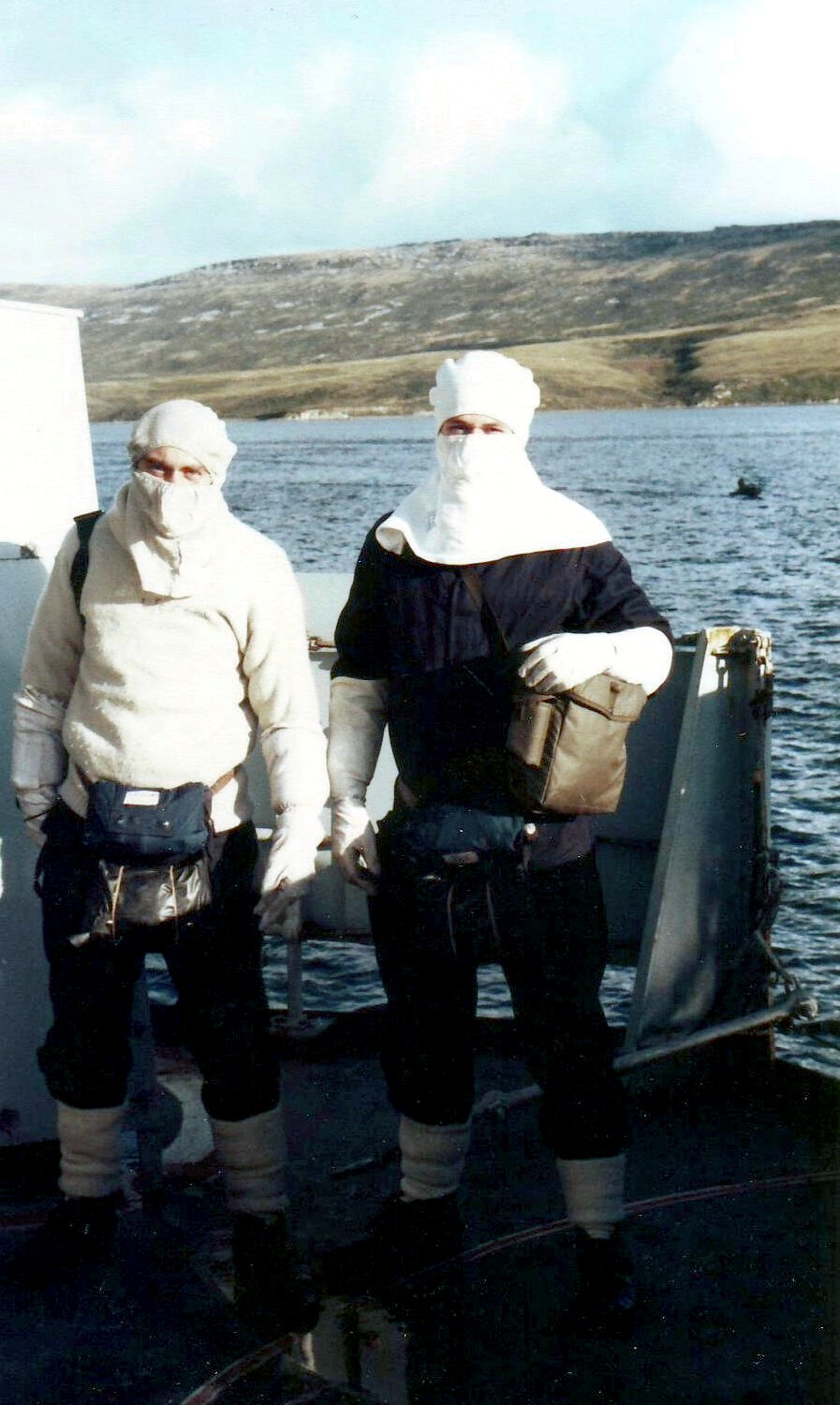
Sailors during the Falklands War wearing anti-flash gear.

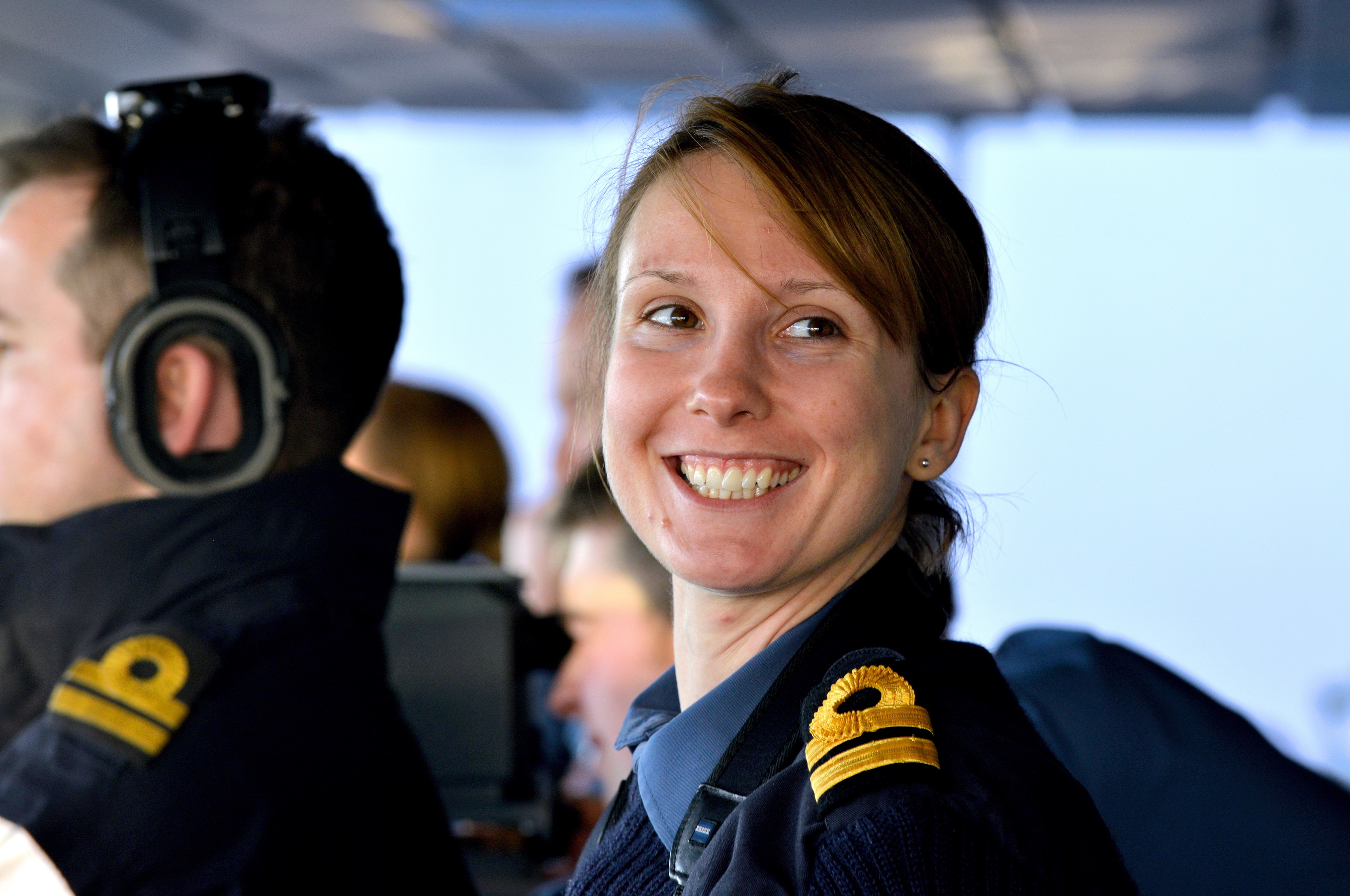
Royal Navy Lieutenant wearing the former No. 4 Action Working Dress (AWD).

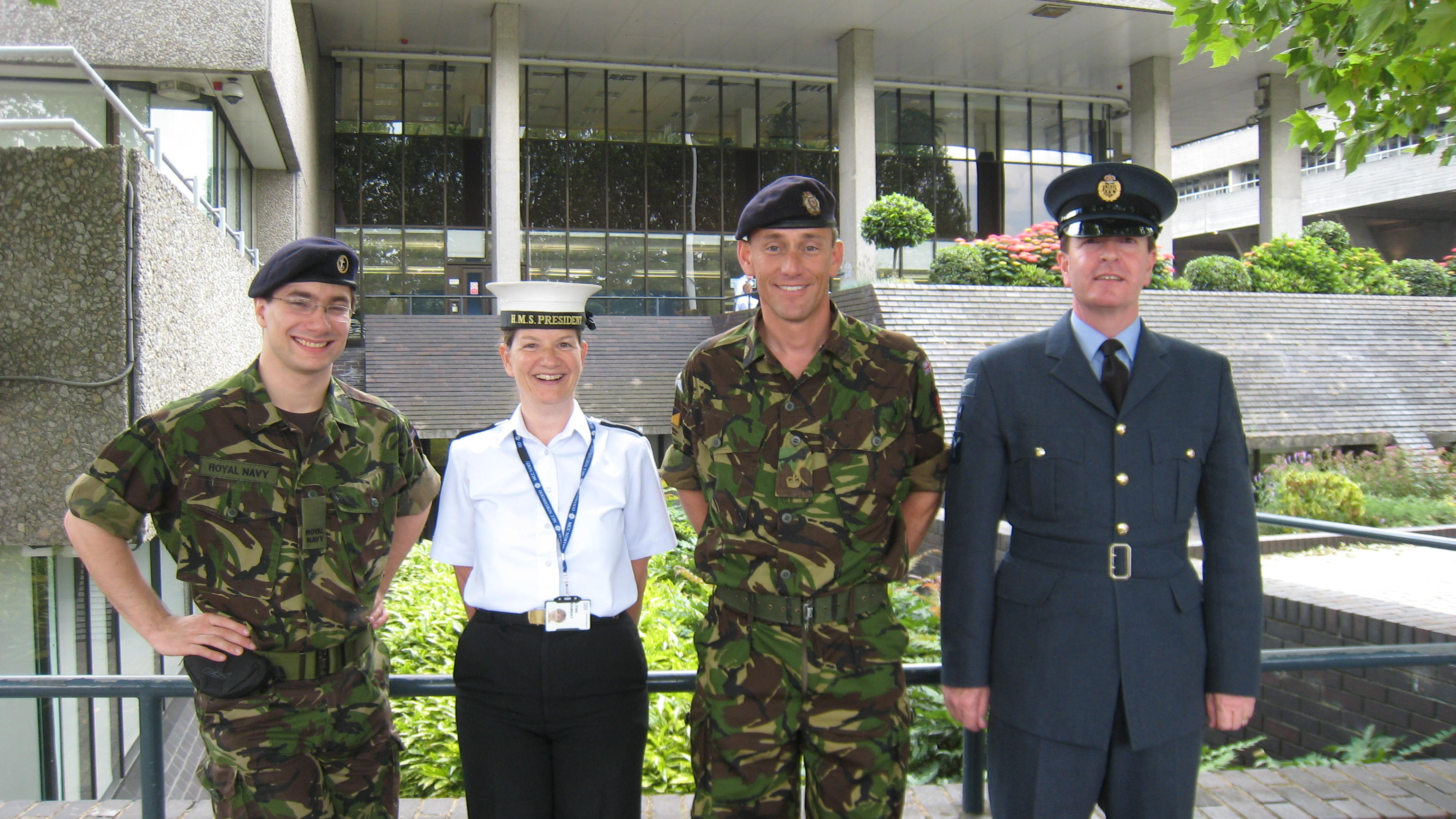
The former No. 8: Temperate Combat Dress worn by a junior rating, left.

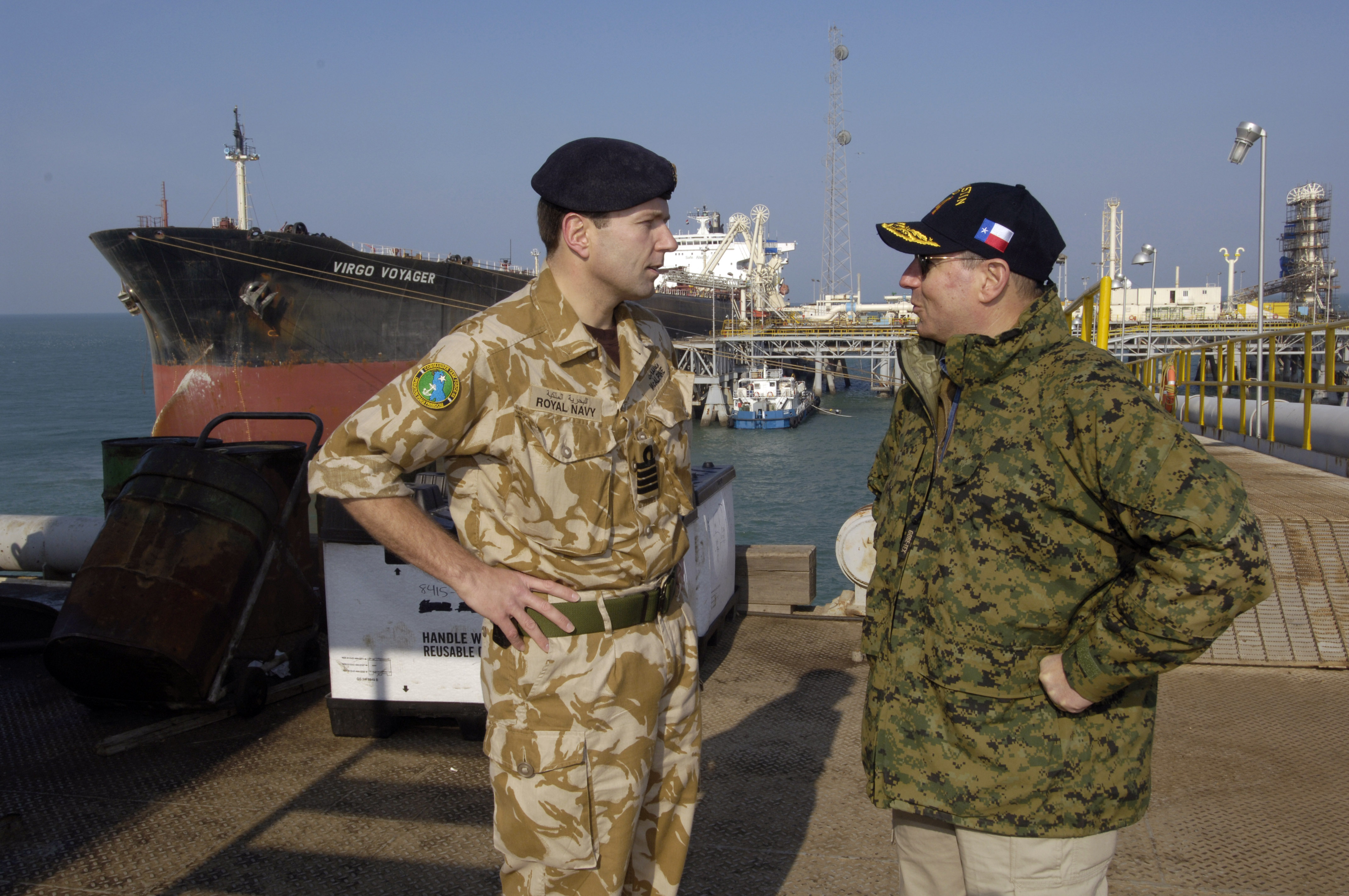
Desert Combat Dress worn by a Royal Navy officer on the left, in 2006.

== See also ==
- British Armed Forces uniforms
- British Army uniform
- History of the Royal Navy
- Royal Air Force uniform
- Royal Navy officer rank insignia
- Royal Navy ratings rank insignia
- Uniforms of the Royal Marines
- The Royal Hospital School
