= Bell-bottoms =

Trousers cut wider at the ankle than the knees

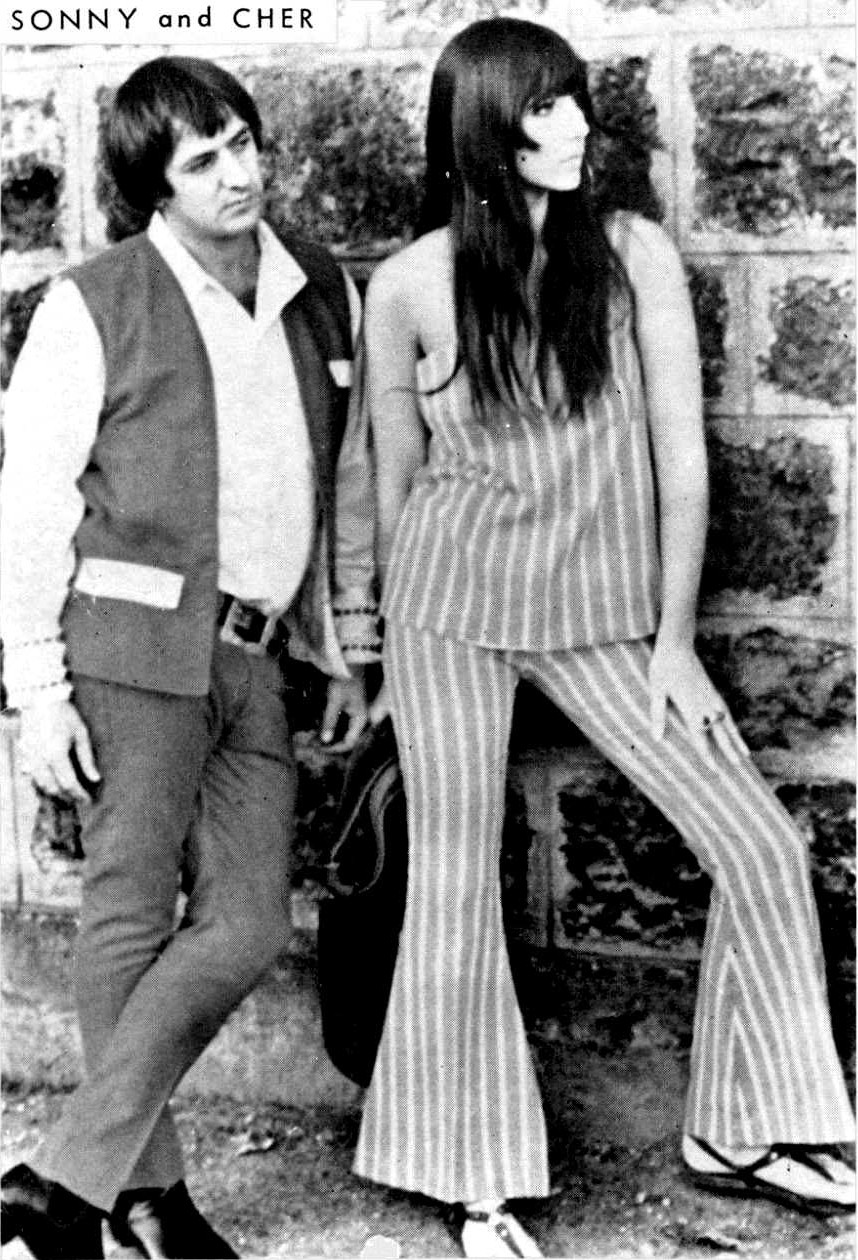
American singer Cher (pictured with Sonny Bono) wearing bell-bottomed trousers, c. 1968

Bell-bottoms (or flares) are a style of trousers that become wider from the knees downward, forming a bell-like shape of the trouser leg.

== History ==
=== Naval origins ===
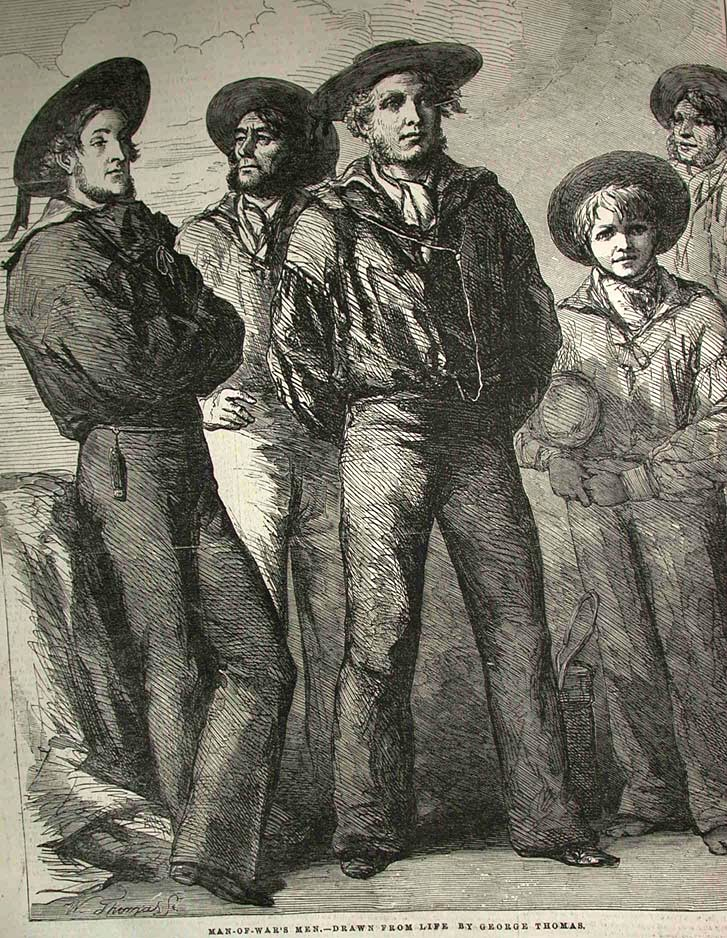
Illustration of Royal Navy sailors in uniform 1854

In the early 19th century, when standardised uniforms for British ratings in the Royal Navy or enlisted men in the U.S. Navy did not as yet exist, some sailors adopted a style of wide trousers ending in bell-shaped cuffs. In 1813, one of the first recorded descriptions of sailors' uniforms, written by Commodore Stephen Decatur, noted that the men on the frigates United States and Macedonia were wearing "glazed canvas hats with stiff brims, decked with streamers of ribbon, blue jackets buttoned loosely over waistcoats, and blue trousers with bell bottoms."

The Royal Navy had often been a leader in nautical fashion, but bell-bottoms did not become part of the standard uniform until the mid-19th century. These bell-bottoms were often just very wide-legged trousers, rather than shaped trousers that flared below the knee. They continued in use as a distinctive feature of the RN rating's "square rig" uniform until replaced by more conventionally flared trousers in 1977.

Although the trousers of the present-day uniform of the United States Navy are still referred to as bell-bottomed, they simply have large straight legs. The wearer's thigh fills the upper trouser leg, making the bottom of the pants leg appear flared. This style has been popular for many years, perhaps originally because the trouser leg can be rolled up easily, allowing the wearer to work in bare feet, but there is no reliable documentation that confirms a specific timeline or reason for the popularity of bell-bottomed trousers in naval apparel.

Some modern naval uniforms continue to use bell-bottomed trousers as a potential life-saving device. The trouser material is made of cotton fibers that swell when wet and can hold air. In the event of a sailor falling overboard or having to abandon ship without a life vest, the bell-bottomed trousers can be quickly removed in the water without having to remove footwear. As part of their survival training, sailors are taught to remove the trousers while floating, tie the leg bottoms in a knot, and then use one of several methods to inflate the trousers with air. The inflated trousers can provide extra flotation while awaiting rescue.

=== Other traditional usages ===
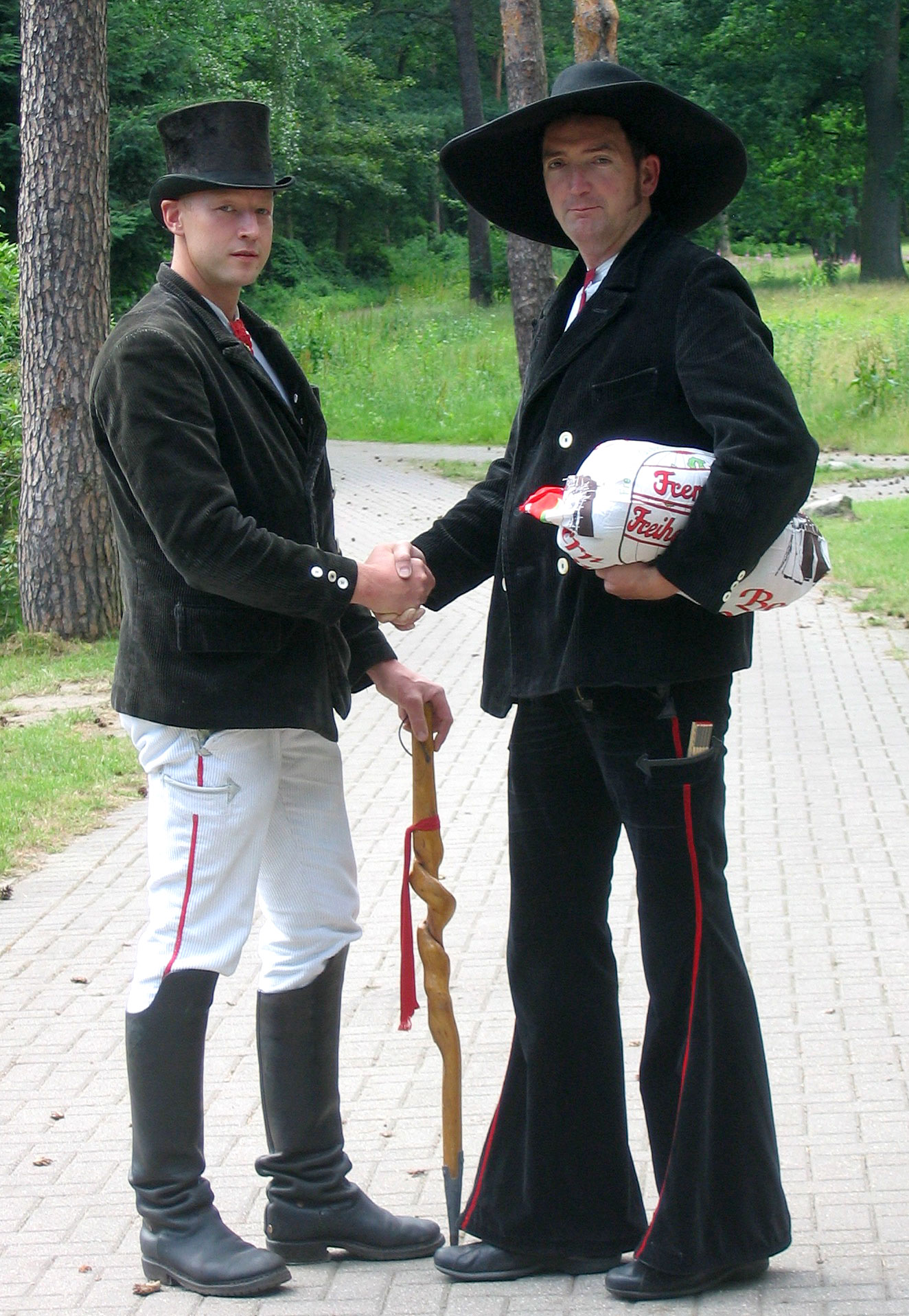
German journeymen, right: a carpenter, 2006

Bell-bottoms have also been worn for centuries by European carpenters, which is explained by the fact that the widening legs prevent sawdust from falling onto their shoes or feet. Bell-bottoms are still worn by carpenters who decide to spend their time after the apprenticeship as journeymen on the road.

=== 1960s and 1970s ===
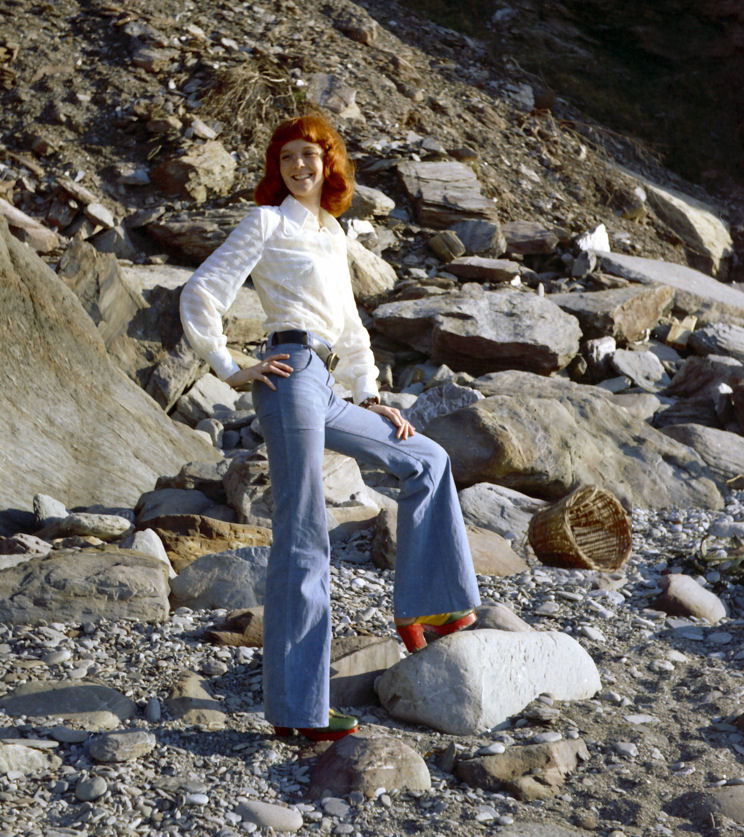
A young woman wears a pair of bell-bottoms, ca. 1970s

In the 1960s, bell-bottoms became fashionable for both men and women in London and expanded into Europe and North America. Often made of denim, they flared out from the bottom of the calf, and had slightly curved hems and a circumference of 18 inches (46 cm) at the bottom of each leg opening. They were usually worn with Cuban-heeled shoes, clogs, or Chelsea boots. Toni Basil, who was a go-go dancer when the 1964 concert film T.A.M.I. Show was released, appeared in the film wearing bell-bottoms with a baby doll blouse.

Peggy Caserta began stocking jeans from San Francisco blue-jeans icon Levi Strauss & Co. in her Haight-Ashbury store Mnasidika during the 1960s. Caserta hired a local artisan to create customized Levi's jeans with added flared inserts. Her store sold to many rising San Francisco musicians, as well as to the general hippie population. When demand for these bell-bottoms exceeded supply, she approached the nearby Levi Strauss & Co. factory, where an employee facilitated the production of flared jeans exclusively for Mnasidika. The partnership lasted through 1968, during which Caserta sold hundreds of pairs. This inspired Levi's to launch its 646 Bell Bottom jean in 1969.

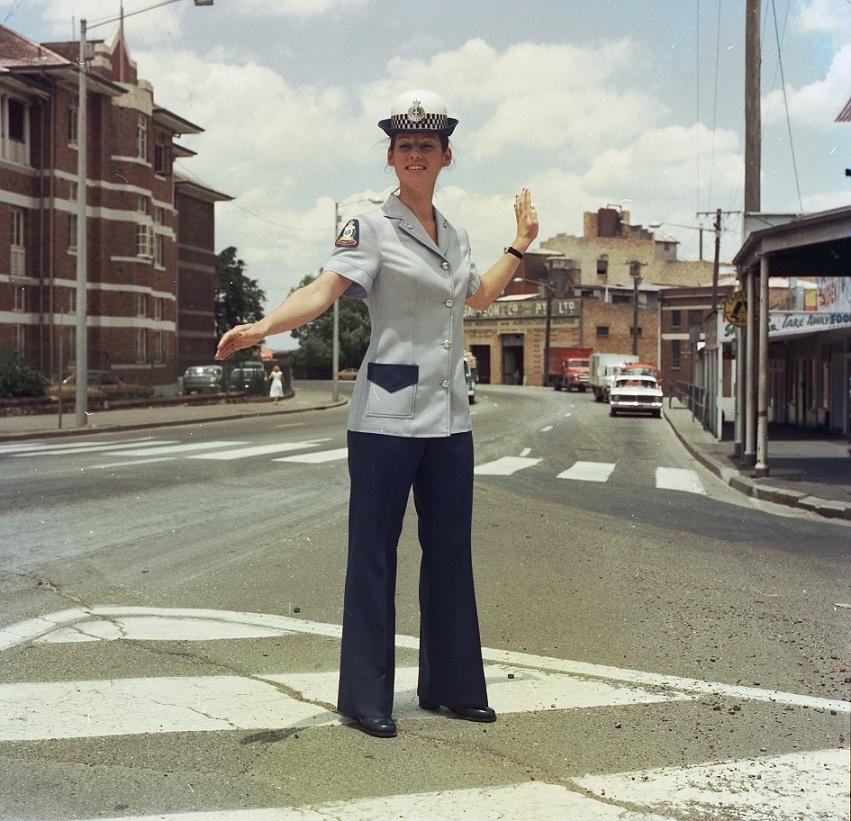
Constable Diana Hotchkis of the Queensland Police Service models the new female summer uniform consisting of a light blue safari jacket with dark blue pockets and bell bottom slacks, 1979

Bell-bottoms are mentioned in the popular 1971 music single "Bell Bottom Blues" by blues-rock group Derek and the Dominos.

In the 1970s, bell-bottoms moved back into mainstream fashion via Brian Spiller; Sonny and Cher helped popularize bell-bottoms in the US by wearing them on their popular television show. The pants were typically flared from the knee down, with bottom leg openings of up to twenty-six inches. Made from denim, bright cotton and satin polyester, they were so popular that they became a symbol of the outlandish and colorful style of the decade.

Loon pants (shortened from "balloon pants") are a variant on bell-bottomed trousers, with an increased flare. They were worn occasionally by go-go dancers on the British television music variety show Ready Steady Go! in 1966.

Elephant bells, popular in the mid-to-late 1970s, are similar to loon pants, but were typically made of denim. Elephant bells had a marked flare below the knee, often covering the wearer's shoes. The preferred shoes were platform shoes with soles at least 2 inches (5.1 cm) thick and heels 4 to 5 inches (10 to 13 cm) to keep the pants' hems off the ground.

After the rise of punk rock in the late 1970s, bell-bottoms began to become less fashionable as the decade drew to a close. By 1979, skin-tight trousers or 1950s-style drain pipes were much more in vogue, with bell-bottoms seen as having had their day, remaining in fashion circa 1967–1978.

=== 1990s to 2000s ===
A revival of bell-bottoms occurred after bands such as The Stone Roses, Happy Mondays and The Charlatans re-introduced them in late 1989 and the early 1990s.

In 1996, women's bell-bottoms were reintroduced to the mainstream public, under the name "boot-cut" (or "bootleg") trousers as the flare was slimmer. By 1999, flare jeans had come into vogue among women, which had a wider, more exaggerated flare than boot-cuts. The boot-cut style ended up dominating the fashion world for 10 years.

By around 2006, the bell-shaped silhouette started to fade as the skinny jean rose in popularity. Sharon Haver, the founder and editor-in-chief of online fashion magazine FocusOnStyle.com, commented "It's as if all the girls wearing premium boot-cut jeans threw them away one day, and the next day began wearing skinny jeans and flats."

Women's boot-cut jeans are tighter at the knee than men's, and flare out from knee to hem. Men's styles are traditionally straight-legged, although the pants came in a more flared style in the early and mid 2000s, but this was optional. The bell-bottoms of the 1960s and 1970s can be distinguished from the flare or boot-cut of the 1990s and 2000s by the tightness of the fabric at the knee.

=== 2020s ===
With the onset of a spectrum of revivalist fashion trends as a result of the COVID-19 pandemic, there has also been revived interest in clothing trends of the 1960s and 1970s, which includes bell-bottoms and flared trousers. Bell-bottoms were still trending on the runway in September 2022, as well as the return to the wide leg bell-bottom in 2023. Celebrities and influencers are wearing bell-bottoms. Kendrick Lamar styled a pair of bell-bottoms during the 2025 Super Bowl halftime show. Fashion designers display them on the runway.

== See also ==
- Bell sleeve – Style of sleeves with flares toward the bottom
- Low-rise (fashion) – Clothing which sits low on or below the hips
- Phat pants – Style of pants
- Wide-leg jeans – Type of trousers
