= Ganto =

Ganto may refer to:

- Yantou Quanhuo (828–887), Buddhist monk
- Sino Ganto (born 1987), South African rugby union player

== See also ==
- Gantos, an American women's specialty clothing retailer based in Grand Rapids, Michigan, USA
- Jack Gantos (born 1951), American author of children's books
