= Sharon Haver =

American fashion stylist

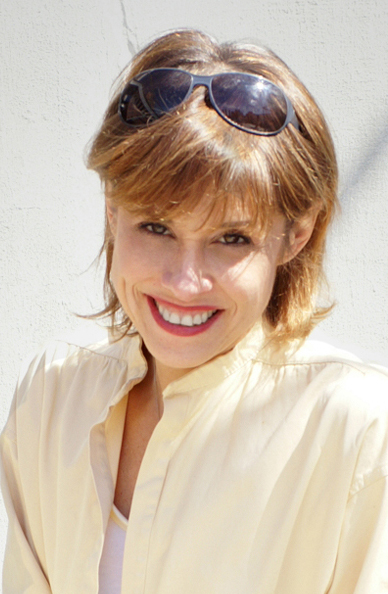
- Born: New York City, New York, United States
- Occupations: Fashion journalist, fashion stylist
- Title: Editor-in-chief FocusOnStyle.com
- Website: http://www.focusonstyle.com

Sharon Haver is a New York City-based Syndicated Fashion Columnist, fashion stylist, and entrepreneur.

== Biography ==
Haver earned a Bachelor of Business Administration in Marketing with a minor in Law.

== Career ==
Haver is the founder and editor-in-chief of online fashion magazine FocusOnStyle.com. The publication, which she founded in 1999, coined the term "can-do chic" and aims to serve as a resource to the "everyday woman". Her work in the magazine has been featured in publications such as The New York Times, Los Angeles Times, USA Today, Financial Times and Daily Mail, the Herald Sun, CNN.com, CNBC.com, Kiplinger’s, Oprah.com, and ELLE, among others.

The magazine was founded by Sharon Haver without raising external financing by bootstrapping.

Haver's work was published in 2012 alongside contributions from Jimmy Carter and Gloria Steinem in 65 Things to Do When You Retire, 65 Notable Achievers on How to Make the Most of the Rest of Your Life.

Haver was featured as an on-air celebrity spokesperson in Macy's department store's 2006 national marketing campaign national television commercial. The campaign also included Stacy London and Clinton Kelly.

She hosts a live weekly radio program, "Focus on Style - Talk Radio," together with Brad Boles of The Real Housewives of New York City.

Before launching the magazine, her fashion advice column, "Sharon Haver’s Focus on Style," was syndicated to over 400 newspapers served by the Scripps Howard News Service including Rocky Mountain News, Columbus Dispatch, Pittsburgh Post-Gazette, Naples Daily News, Press-Enterprise, and Mobile Press-Register, and she has also been featured on media such as Martha Stewart Living Radio, Hallmark Channel's Emeril’s Table, USA Radio Network, BBC World Service, CBC Radio, American Journal, The Montel Williams Show, and The Joe Franklin Show.

Prior to her work at FocusOnStyle, Haver spent over 15 years as a fashion photography fashion stylist in both print and live action for clients such as Vogue Mexico, Us Magazine, Live! with Regis and Kathie Lee, A Current Affair, Soap Opera Weekly, Star Magazine, Avon, Ladies' Home Journal, Macy’s, Perry Ellis, Pepsi Cola, Bamberger's, Gantos, BMG Music, IBM, VF Corporation, GTE, Manufacturers Hanover Trust, RJ Reynolds, as well as fashion brands like Candie's, Le Tigre Clothing, Oleg Cassini, Evan-Picone, Merona, and celebrities such as Rebecca Romijn, Kelly Ripa, Famke Jansen, Elle Macpherson, Wilt Chamberlain, Tracee Ellis Ross, Debbie Gibson, and Kyra Sedgwick.

J. Alexander and Phillip Bloch both worked with Haver as assistants on her fashion stylist team.
