= Carl Steedman =

British Royal Navy officer

Lieutenant Commander Carl Steedman MSM
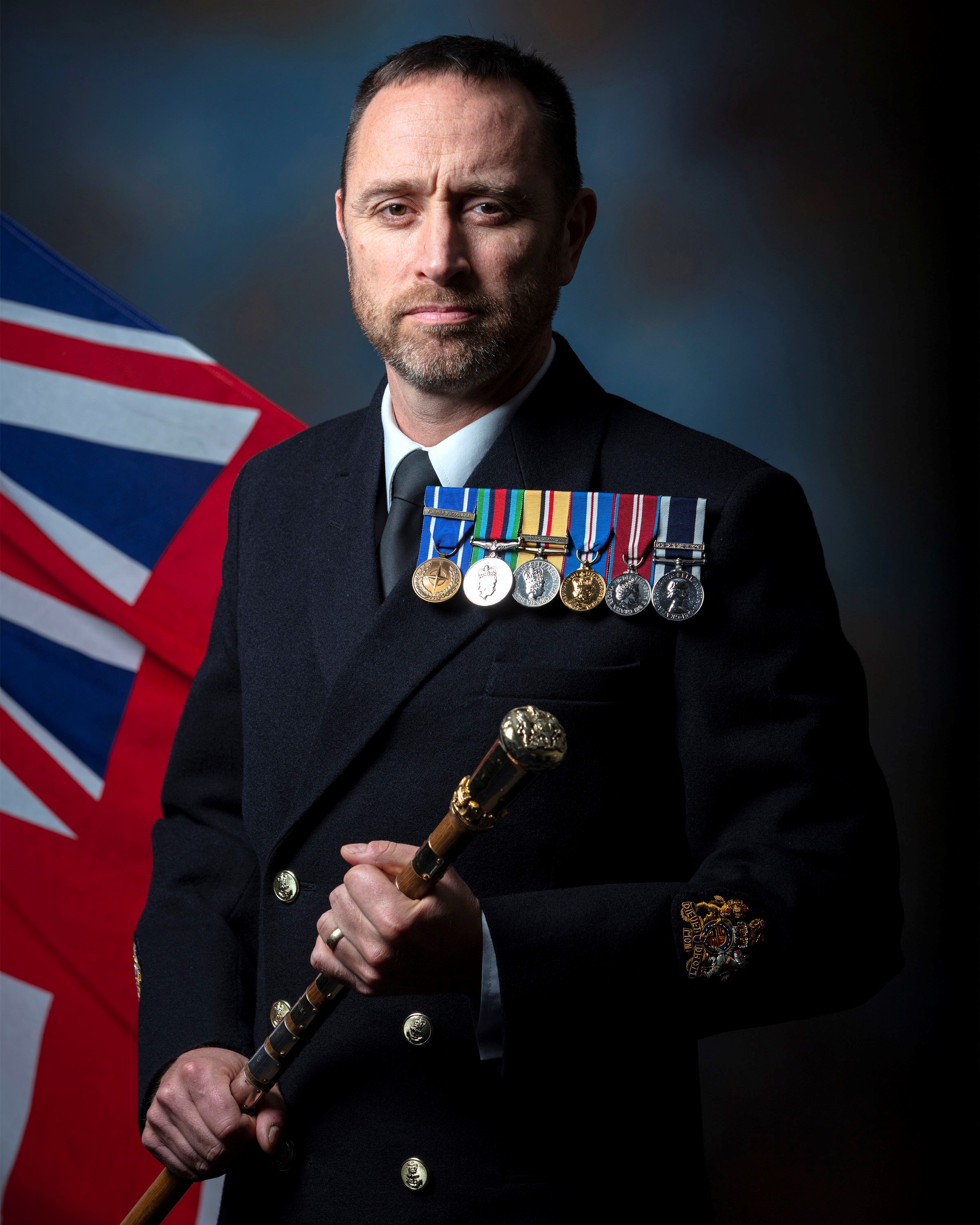
- Born: 14 August 1973 (age 53); Brighton, East Sussex
- Military career
- Allegiance: United Kingdom
- Branch: Royal Navy
- Service years: 1991–present
- Rank: Lieutenant Commander
- Nickname: Speedy
- Commands: Warrant Officer to the Royal Navy
- Conflicts: Iraq War
- Awards: Meritorious Service Medal

Lieutenant Commander Carl P. "Speedy" Steedman (born 14 August 1973) is a Royal Navy officer, who served as Warrant Officer to the Royal Navy, the most senior non-commissioned advisor and senior rating of the Royal Navy from 31 January 2020 to July 2022.

== Naval career ==
Steedman joined the Royal Navy as a radio operator in May 1991, attending the school of communications at HMS Mercury after completion of his initial training at HMS Raleigh. His first sea draft was on HMS Manchester. Steedman then transferred to the warfare branch as an operator mechanic in October 1993 before serving on HMS Invincible, deploying to the Adriatic. He brought HMS Ocean into service, deploying to both Belize and Sierra Leone. Promoted to petty officer in 2001, he joined HMS Edinburgh as petty officer communications before deploying on Operation Telic. After this deployment, he then joined Northwood Headquarters.

Promoted to chief petty officer in October 2006, he joined the Maritime Battle Staff whereby he was promoted to warrant officer 1 and served as the warrant officer of the communications school.

After decommissioning HMS Ocean, he joined HMS Excellent as the base warrant officer in April 2018. Having spent 17 months in post, he was selected for the role of Warrant Officer of the Royal Navy in January 2020.

Steedman was awarded the Naval Long Service and Good Conduct Medal in 2006, and a clasp to the medal in 2018. He was awarded the Meritorious Service Medal in 2020.

== See also ==
- Paul Carney, Army Sergeant Major of the British Army
- Nick Ollive, Corps Regimental Sergeant Major
- Richard Angove, Senior Enlisted Advisor to the Chiefs of Staff Committee and previous Corps Regimental Sergeant Major in the Royal Marines.
- Murugesvaran Subramaniam, Warrant Officer of the Royal Air Force

Military offices
Preceded by Nicholas Sharland	Warrant Officer to the Royal Navy; 2020–2022	Succeeded by Jamie Wright
