= Steve Cass =

British Royal Navy officer

Lieutenant Commander Steve Cass MSM
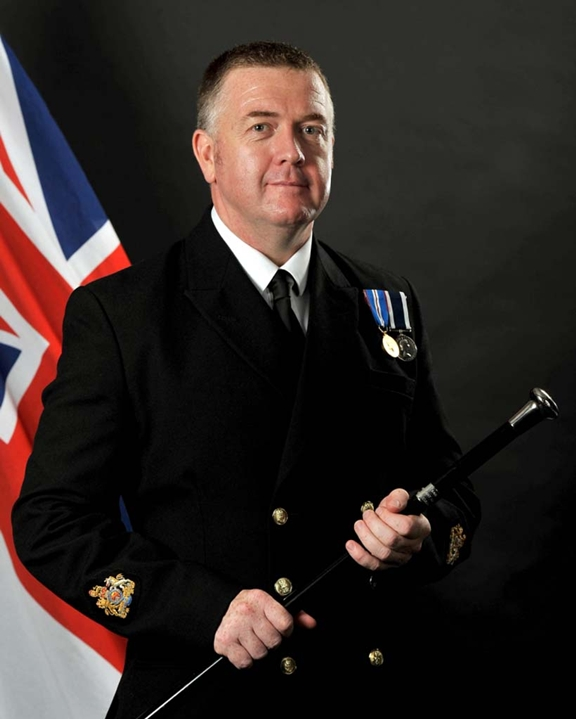
- Born: July 1966 (age 60)
- Military career
- Allegiance: United Kingdom
- Branch: Royal Navy
- Service years: 1986–
- Rank: Lieutenant Commander
- Commands: Warrant Officer of the Naval Service

Lieutenant Commander Steven Paul Cass (born July 1966) is a British Royal Navy officer. From 2013 to 2017, he was the Warrant Officer of the Naval Service (now Warrant Officer of the Royal Navy) and, therefore, the most senior rating of the Royal Navy. He is the first person from the Fleet Air Arm and the second person overall to hold the appointment. Since 2025, he has been captain of HMS Victory.

== Early life ==
Cass was born in July 1966, and is from Porthleven, Cornwall. He was educated at Helston Community College, a comprehensive school in Helston, Cornwall. He left school at 17 to join the Royal Navy.

== Military career ==
In 1986, Cass joined the Fleet Air Arm of the Royal Navy as an air engineering mechanic second class. He spent his early years with 820 Naval Air Squadron based at RNAS Culdrose. In 1988, he undertook a six-month tour of the Far East on board HMS Ark Royal. He completed the artificer course in 1991. In 1994, he was serving with 771 Naval Air Squadron.

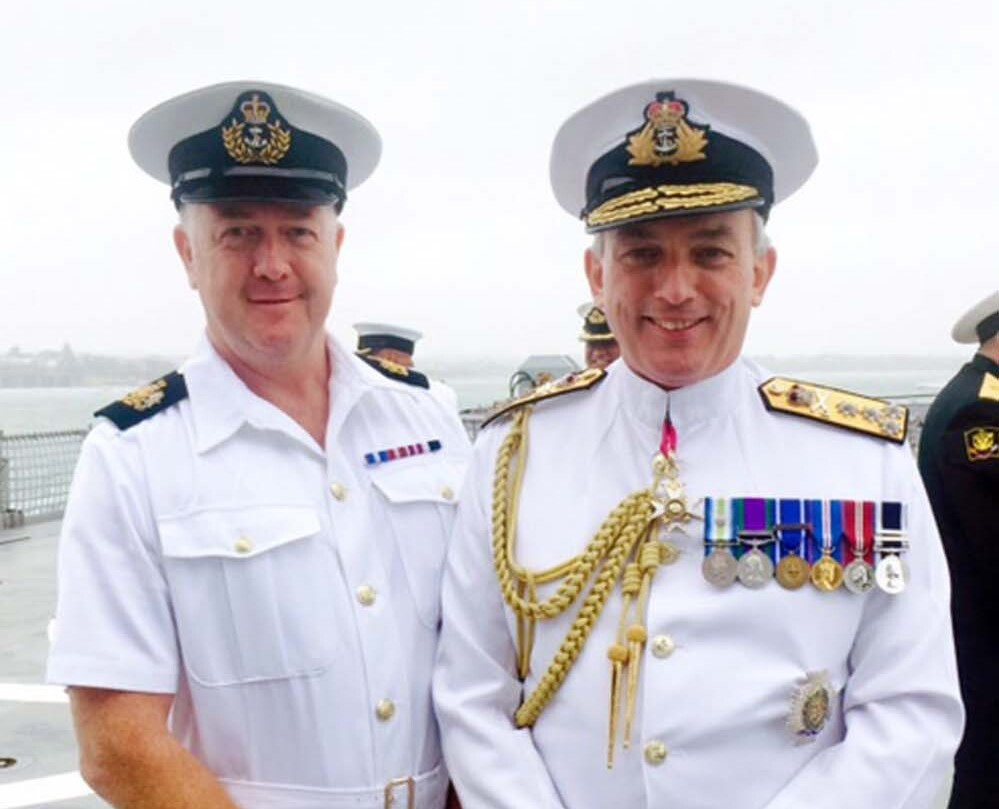
Cass (left) as WONS alongside Philip Jones, the First Sea Lord in 2016

In 2005, Cass was promoted to warrant officer 2 and appointed senior maintenance rating of 700M Naval Air Squadron. In 2008, he was promoted to the rank of warrant officer 1. From 2009 to 2011, he was attached to AgustaWestland as the "structural integrity engineering authority responsible for the safety and airworthiness of all Merlin’s across the MOD and around the world". From 2011 to 2013, he served as base warrant officer of RNAS Culdrose. During this time, he was also president of the station's warrant officers' and senior rates' mess.

In July 2013, Cass was awarded the Meritorious Service Medal, receiving it from Vice Admiral David Steel in a ceremony in September. In December 2013, he was appointed Warrant Officer of the Naval Service (WONS).

Having completed his term as WONS, Cass commissioned as a Lieutenant on 27 March 2017 and appointed to the trained strength on 12 April 2017. He was promoted to lieutenant commander on 1 October 2022. In 2025, he was appointed commanding officer of HMS Victory, the world's oldest naval vessel still in commission and the First Sea Lord's flagship.

Military offices
Preceded by Terry Casey	Warrant Officer of the Naval Service; 2013–2017	Succeeded by Nicholas Sharland
