= Warrant Officer to the Royal Navy =

Appointment in the British Royal Navy

- Ensign of the Royal Navy

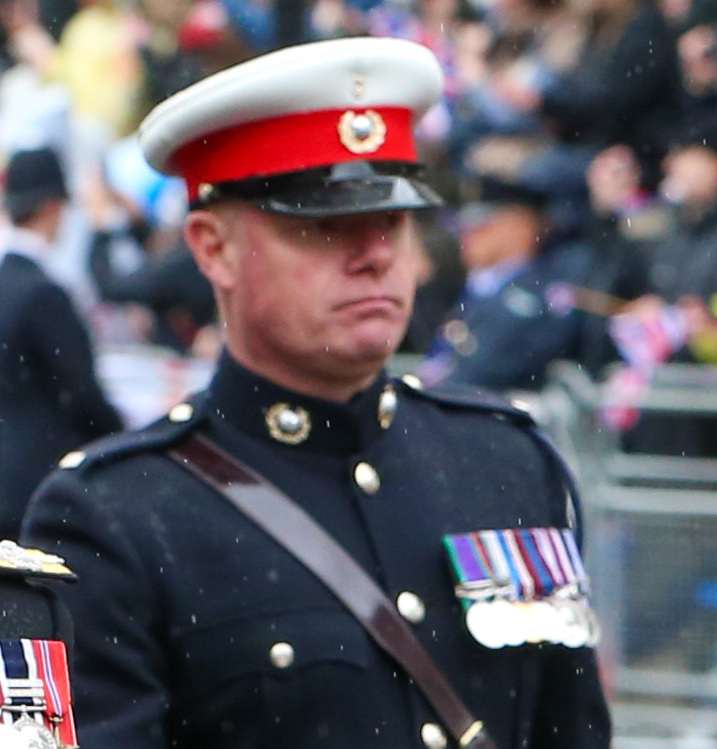
- Incumbent; WO1 Jamie Wright since July 2022
- Ministry of Defence
- Style: Warrant Officer
- Abbreviation: WORN
- Reports to: Navy Command
- Nominator: Second Sea Lord
- Appointer: Navy Board
- Term length: Not fixed (typically 1–4 years)
- Precursor: Second Sea Lord's Command Warrant Officer
- Formation: 2010
- First holder: Terry Casey
- Website: Official Website

The Warrant Officer to the Royal Navy (WORN), previously known as the Warrant Officer of the Naval Service (WONS), is the most senior warrant officer and rating of the Royal Navy. The person holding this appointment's main responsibility is to act as a channel between the non commissioned ranks and Senior Naval officers, enabling communication between the Sailors and Marines and the Senior Navy leadership.

The post was created in 2010, replacing the post of Second Sea Lord's Command Warrant Officer.

== Insignia ==
A command warrant officer badge is worn on the left breast of their uniform during the period of the appointment.

For ceremonial occasions they may carry a ceremonial cane, made out of wood from HMS Victory.

== Appointees ==
No.	Portrait	Name	Took office	Left office	Time in office	Ref.
1	Terry Casey MBE	Terry Casey MBE	July 2010	December 2013	3 years, 5 months	.
2	Steve Cass	Steve Cass	December 2013	17 March 2017	3 years, 3 months	
3	Nicholas Sharland MBE	Nicholas Sharland MBE	17 March 2017	Jan 2020	2 years, 11 months	
4	Carl Steedman	Carl Steedman (born 1973)	20 January 2020	July 2022	2 years, 5 months	
5	Jamie Wright	Jamie Wright	July 2022	Incumbent	4 years, 2 months	

== See also ==
- Warrant Officer of the Royal Air Force – the Royal Air Force equivalent
- Corps Regimental Sergeant Major – Royal Marines
- Army Sergeant Major – British Army equivalent
- Senior Enlisted Advisor to the Chiefs of Staff Committee - senior OR to Chiefs of Staff Committee
