= Terry Casey (Royal Navy sailor) =

Terry Casey MBE
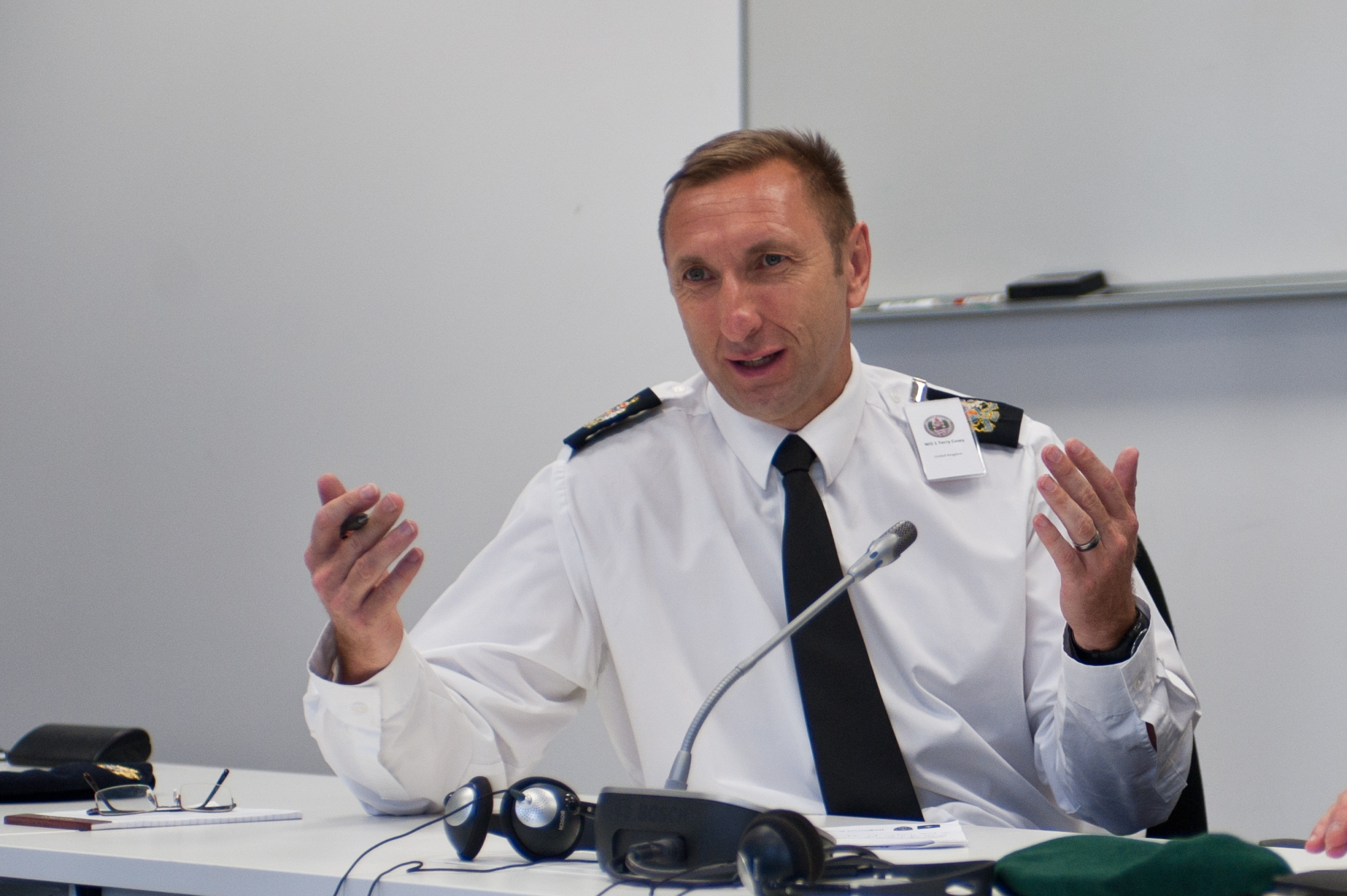
- Military career
- Allegiance: United Kingdom
- Branch: Royal Navy
- Service years: 1981–2013
- Rank: Warrant officer 1
- Commands: Warrant Officer of the Naval Service
- Awards: Member of the Order of the British Empire

Terrence Casey, MBE is a retired Royal Navy warrant officer 1. He was the first person to hold the appointment of Warrant Officer of the Naval Service and was, therefore, the most senior rating of the Royal Navy.

== Military career ==
Casey joined the Royal Navy in 1981. During his time in the navy he served on four warships. He also served ashore at a number of shore establishments, including HMS Raleigh and others in the Plymouth and Portsmouth areas. He has been posted abroad to Kosovo, Portugal and the United States.

In July 2010, Casey was appointed Warrant Officer of the Naval Service. In that role he attended all Navy Board meetings as an observer. He was appointed a Member of the Order of the British Empire in the 2013 Queen's Birthday Honours, and was succeeded as Warrant Officer of the Naval Service in December that year by Warrant Officer Class 1 Steve Cass.

Casey is a recipient of the Long Service and Good Conduct Medal with clasp in recognition of 30 years service in the Royal Navy.

== Personal life ==
Casey married Susan in 1989. They have three daughters; Aimee joined the Royal Navy in 2012.

Military offices
New title	Warrant Officer of the Naval Service; 2010–2013	Succeeded by Steve Cass
