= Gantos =

American women's clothing retailer

- Industry: Clothing retailer
- Founded: 1932
- Defunct: 2000
- Fate: Bankruptcy
- Headquarters: Grand Rapids, Michigan

Gantos was a women's specialty clothing retailer based in Grand Rapids, Michigan, USA. The company was founded in 1932 and specialized in private label and name brand apparel.

Gantos was founded by Lebanese immigrant couple Theodore and Haseebie Gantos. It started as a linen store and then sold hosiery until Haseebie suggested the inclusion of women's sportswear, blouses and lingerie. In the late 1980s, Forbes Magazine named Gantos one of the fastest growing women's specialty retailers in the country, and by early 1993 the company grew to a peak of 163 stores. However, in late 1993, the company announced bankruptcy reorganization, closing 50 stores between 1993 and 1994. Following these closures, the chain moved their headquarters to Stamford, Connecticut and made an attempt over the next several years to turn the business around. Ultimately by the end of the decade they announced the liquidation of their remaining 114 stores across 24 states, with the company ceasing operation in 2000.
