= Operation Shader =

British military intervention in Iraq and Syria

- Part of the War against the Islamic State, the US-led intervention in Iraq (2014–2021), the US intervention in the Syrian civil war and the Foreign involvement in the Syrian civil war
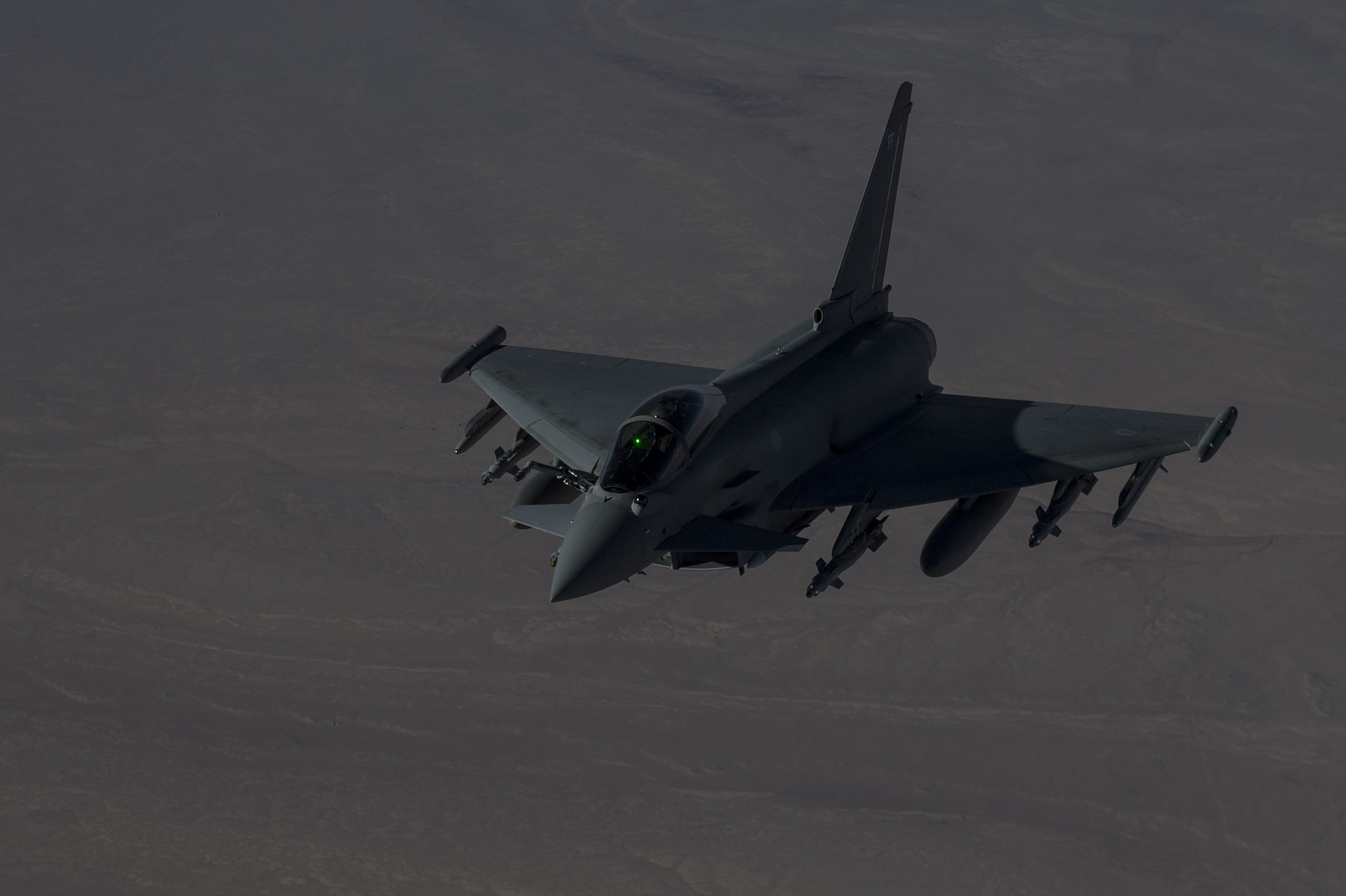
- A Typhoon FGR4 flies over Iraq on 22 December 2015.
Date	9 August 2014–present
Location	Iraq, Syria, Libya, and Lebanon
Status	Ongoing: British airstrikes and ground support against IS in Iraq and Syria; Recapture of all IS-held territory in Iraq by 10 December 2017; Complete military defeat of IS in Syria on 23 March 2019; Numerous IS leaders killed; Multiple terrorist acts committed by IS in London and Manchester leading to 34 deaths; British withdrawal of ground forces from Iraq in 2026

Belligerents
United Kingdom	Islamic State

Commanders and leaders
(United Kingdom) Andy Burnham; (United Kingdom) Wes Streeting; Rich Knighton; Allan Marshall; Gp Capt Guy Lefroy; Former: (United Kingdom) David Cameron; (United Kingdom) Theresa May; (United Kingdom) Boris Johnson; (United Kingdom) Liz Truss; (United Kingdom) Rishi Sunak; (United Kingdom) Keir Starmer; (United Kingdom) Michael Fallon; (United Kingdom) Gavin Williamson; (United Kingdom) Penny Mordaunt; (United Kingdom) Ben Wallace; (United Kingdom) Amber Rudd; (United Kingdom) Sajid Javid; (United Kingdom) Priti Patel; (United Kingdom) Suella Braverman; Nick Houghton; Stuart Peach; Nick Carter; Tony Radakin; Peter Wall; Nick Carter; Mark Carleton-Smith; Mark Poffley; Nick Pope; Christopher Tickell; Glenn Haughton; Gavin Paton; George Zambellas; Philip Jones; Tony Radakin; Andrew Pulford; Stephen Hillier; Michael Wigston; Charles Stickland; Nick Perry; Graeme Spark; Clive Martland; Jon Crossley; Jake Alpert	Abu Hafs al-Hashimi al-Qurashi (caliph of IS); Abu al-Hussein al-Husseini al-Qurashi †; Abu al-Hasan al-Hashimi al-Qurashi †; Abu Ibrahim al-Hashimi al-Qurashi †; Abu Bakr al-Baghdadi † (Islamic State) Abu Alaa Afri †; Abu Suleiman al-Naser †; Abu Omar al-Shishani †

Units involved
Royal Air Force; British Army; Royal Navy	Military of the Islamic State

Strength
See Deployed forces	9,000–18,000 (U.S. intelligence estimate, January 2015); 20,000–31,500 (CIA estimate, September 2014) * 850 British jihadists

Casualties and losses
3 servicemen killed (2 non-combat); 2 servicemen wounded 8 volunteer SDF fighters killed 2 volunteer aid workers murdered 1 journalist missing	4,066 killed, 303 injured (per UK, 2021)

Operation Shader is the operational code name given to the contribution of the United Kingdom in its war against the Islamic State. The operation involved the British Army providing ground support and training to allied forces fighting against IS, the Royal Air Force providing humanitarian aid airdrops, reconnaissance and airstrikes, and the Royal Navy providing reconnaissance and airstrikes from the UK carrier strike group and escort to allied carrier battle groups. Additionally, British special forces had reportedly operated in Iraq, Syria, and Libya.

In January 2019, the Ministry of Defence stated that 1,700 British airstrikes so far had killed or injured 4,315 enemy fighters in Iraq and Syria, with one civilian casualty. The RAF had also delivered £230 million worth of humanitarian aid. Overall, the operation had resulted in a net cost of £1.75 billion. The number of airstrikes carried out in Iraq and Syria has been second only to the United States, with a report that the RAF has conducted 20 percent of all airstrikes. The operation became the most intense flying mission the RAF had undertaken in 25 years.

On 28 September 2024, the Ministry of Defence announced that the Global Coalition's military mission in Iraq would draw to a close over the following 12 months, with the UK moving towards an enduring bilateral security and defence partnership with Iraq. The UK continued Operation Shader during the transition, including RAF operations against Daesh in Syria. On 30 September 2026, the Global Coalition's military mission in Iraq concluded and coalition forces, including UK personnel, departed Iraq. The UK stated that Operation Shader would continue as part of its wider contribution to the defeat of Daesh, while UK-Iraqi security cooperation would continue through an enduring bilateral defence partnership.

== Background ==
In 2014, the militant group Islamic State made vast territorial gains in Iraq and Syria following several offensives. It declared its captured territory a caliphate within which it enforced a strict interpretation of Sharia. The group, which is designated a terrorist organisation by the United Nations, received widespread condemnation for its human rights abuses and crimes against humanity. The Iraqi government formally requested the United States and wider international community to carry out airstrikes against ISIL in support of their fight on the ground. During the 2014 NATO summit in Wales, U.S. Secretary of State John Kerry pressed Ministers of Australia, Canada, Denmark, France, Germany, Italy, Turkey and the United Kingdom to support a coalition to combat ISIL militarily and financially. The United States launched the Combined Joint Task Force – Operation Inherent Resolve (CJTF–OIR) on 17 October with the stated aim of degrading and destroying ISIL.

== Iraq ==
=== Humanitarian aid and surveillance ===
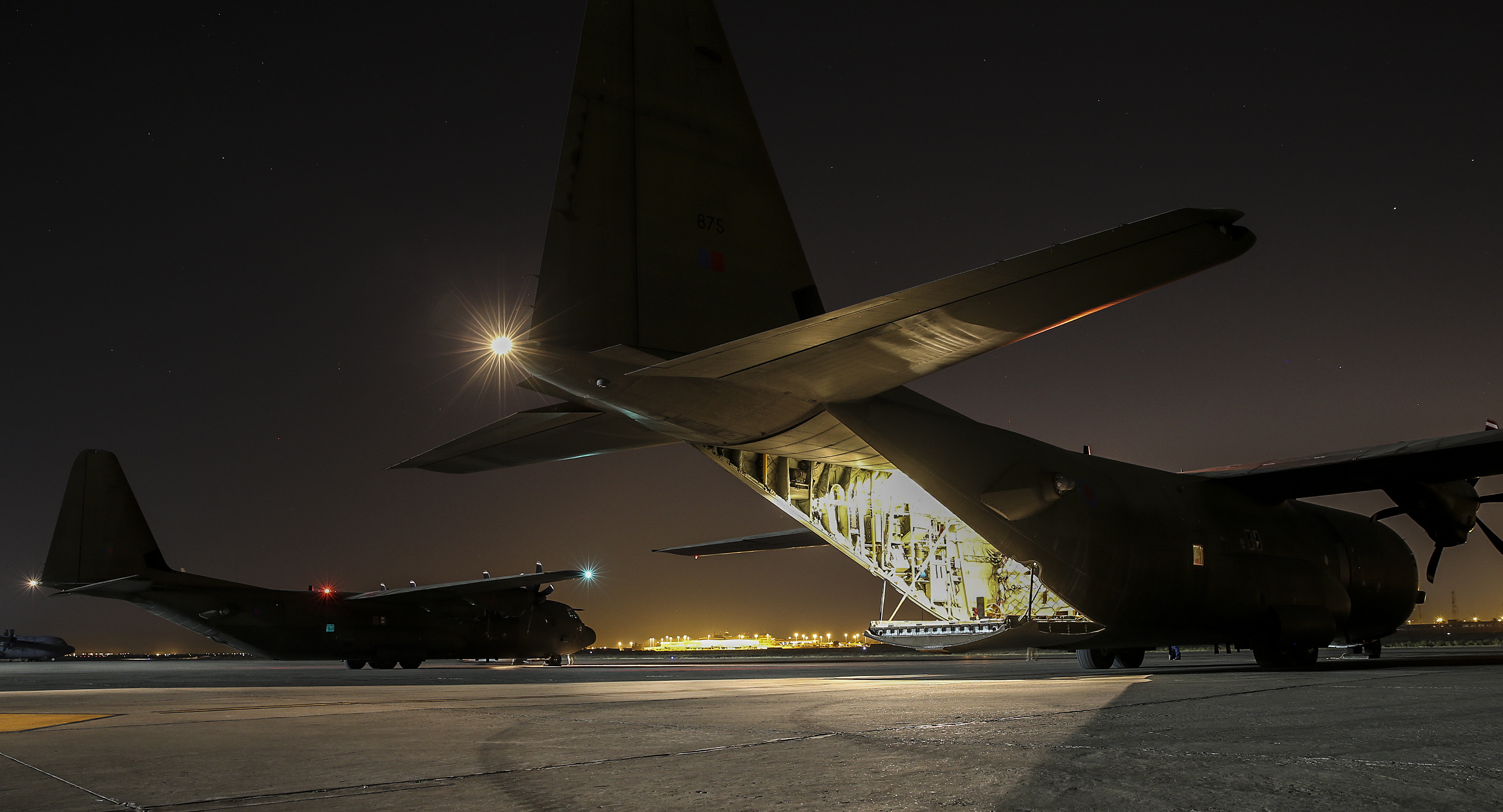
Two Royal Air Force (RAF) C-130J Hercules aircraft in Iraq, after being unloaded of vital humanitarian supplies on 9 September 2014.

On 9 August 2014, following the genocide of Yazidis and other ethnic minorities by ISIL in northern Iraq, the British government deployed the Royal Air Force to conduct humanitarian aid airdrops. The first airdrop was conducted on 9 August, with two Lockheed C-130 Hercules aircraft, flying from RAF Akrotiri in Cyprus, airdropping bundles of aid into Mount Sinjar. A second airdrop on 12 August had to be aborted due to a perceived risk of injury to civilians. The airdrops were able to resume within 24 hours and two large consignments of aid were airdropped over Mount Sinjar. During the same day, the Ministry of Defence announced the deployment of Tornado GR4 strike aircraft to help coordinate the airdrops using their LITENING III reconnaissance pods; they were not authorized to conduct any airstrikes prior to Parliamentary approval. Four Chinook transport helicopters were also deployed alongside them to participate in any required refugee rescue missions. On 13 August 2014, two C-130 Hercules aircraft dropped a third round of humanitarian aid into Mount Sinjar. This was followed by a fourth and final round on 14 August, bringing the total number of humanitarian aid airdrops conducted by the RAF to seven. The UK suspended its humanitarian aid airdrops on 14 August 2014 due to the "improved humanitarian situation" in Mount Sinjar.

On 16 August 2014, following the suspension of humanitarian aid airdrops, the RAF began shifting its focus from humanitarian relief to surveillance. The Tornado GR4s, which were previously used to help coordinate humanitarian aid airdrops, were re-tasked to gather vital intelligence for anti-ISIL forces. A RC-135 Rivet Joint signals intelligence aircraft was also deployed on what was the type's first operational deployment since entering service. The aircraft was based at RAF Al Udeid in Qatar alongside American aircraft. In addition to Tornado and Rivet Joint, the RAF also deployed Reaper, Sentinel, Shadow and Sentry aircraft to fly surveillance missions over Iraq and Syria.

When asked whether the country would participate in airstrikes or send ground troops, Defence Secretary Michael Fallon stated: "We have not been asked to commit either combat troops on the ground – and we are not going to do that – and we have not been asked to join in other air strikes though we certainly welcome [them]".

=== Parliamentary approval ===
On 20 September 2014, Iraq presented a letter to the UN Security Council (of which the United Kingdom is a permanent member) calling for military assistance in its fight against ISIL, echoing calls they made at the Paris conference on 15 September.

On 26 September 2014, Prime Minister David Cameron recalled Parliament to debate the authorisation of British airstrikes against ISIL in Iraq. Cameron insisted that intervention, at the request of the Iraqi government, to combat a "brutal terrorist organisation" was "morally justified". He went on to state that ISIL was a "direct threat to the United Kingdom" and that British inaction would lead to "more killing" in Iraq. Following a seven-hour debate, Parliament voted overwhelmingly in favour of airstrikes, with 524 votes in favour and 43 against. The 43 'No' votes came from 23 Labour MPs, six Conservative MPs, five Scottish National Party MPs, three Social Democratic and Labour Party MPs, two Plaid Cymru MPs, one Liberal Democrat MP, one Green Party MP, and one Respect Party MP. Following the vote, Defence Secretary Michael Fallon told the BBC that the priority would be to stop the slaughter of civilians in Iraq, and that the UK and its allies would be guided by Iraqi and Kurdish intelligence in identifying targets.

=== Airstrikes ===
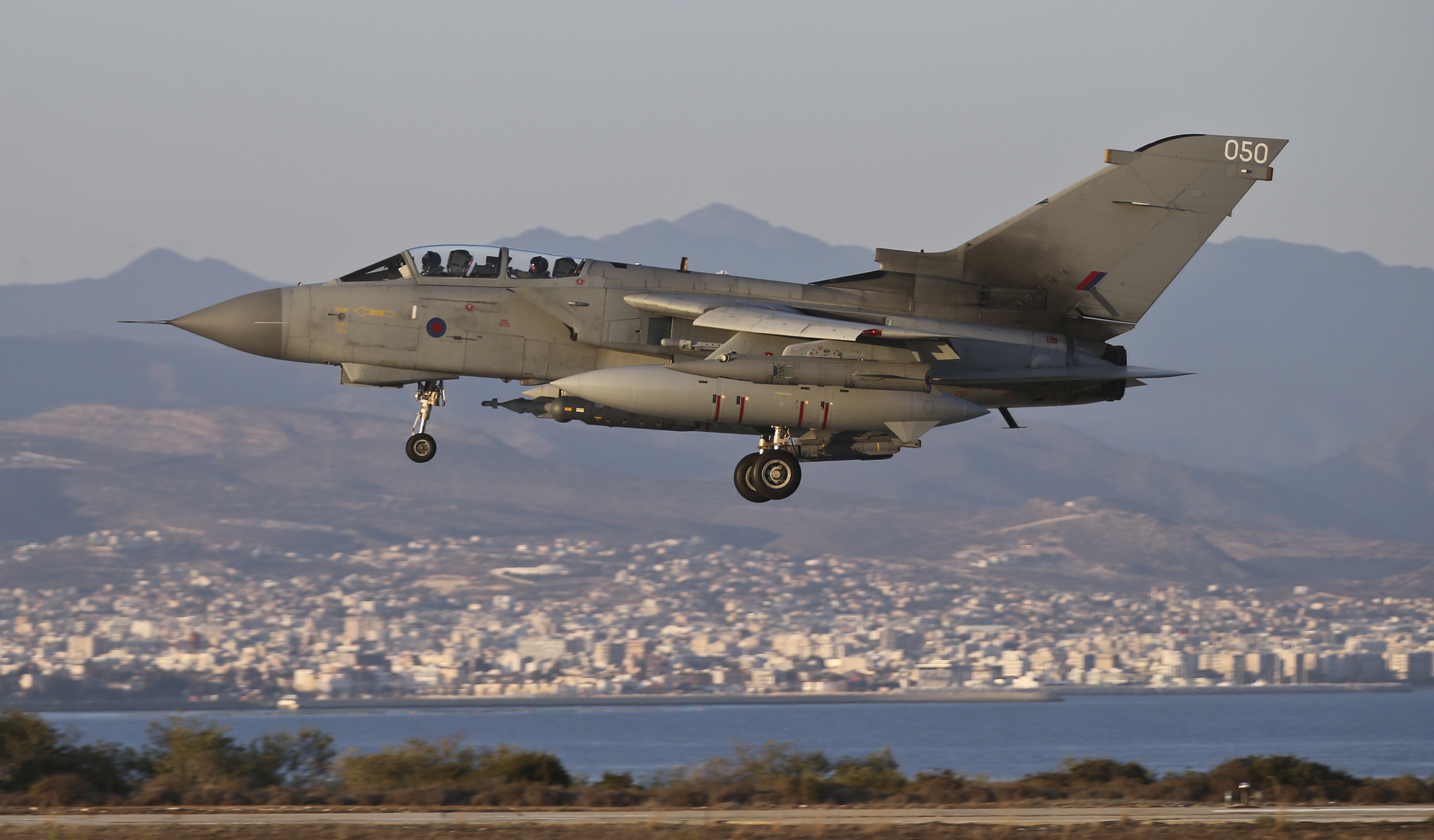
A Tornado GR4 returns to RAF Akrotiri after the first airstrikes on 30 September 2014.

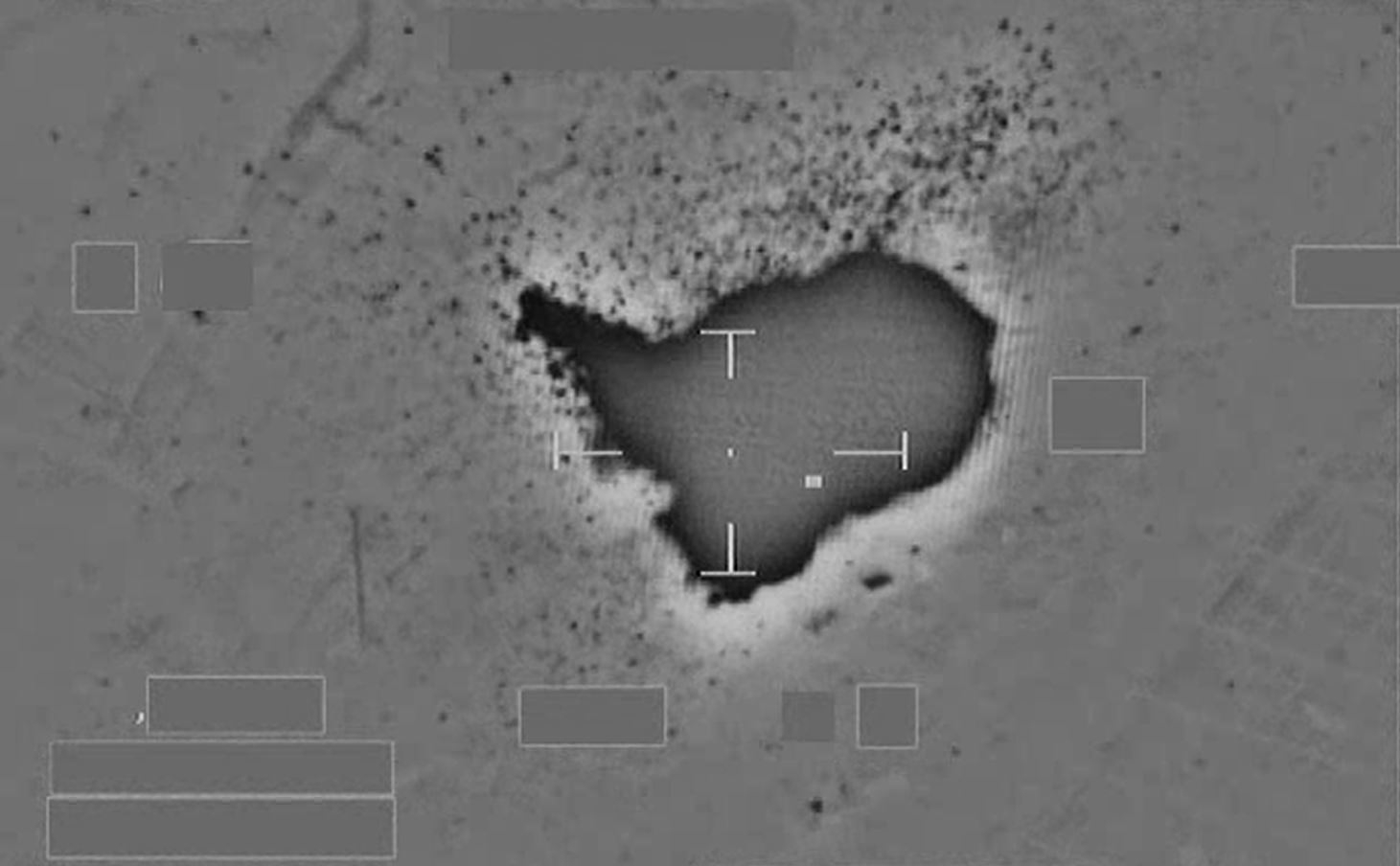
A Tornado GR4 destroys an ISIL armoured vehicle in Al Qaim on 2 November 2014.

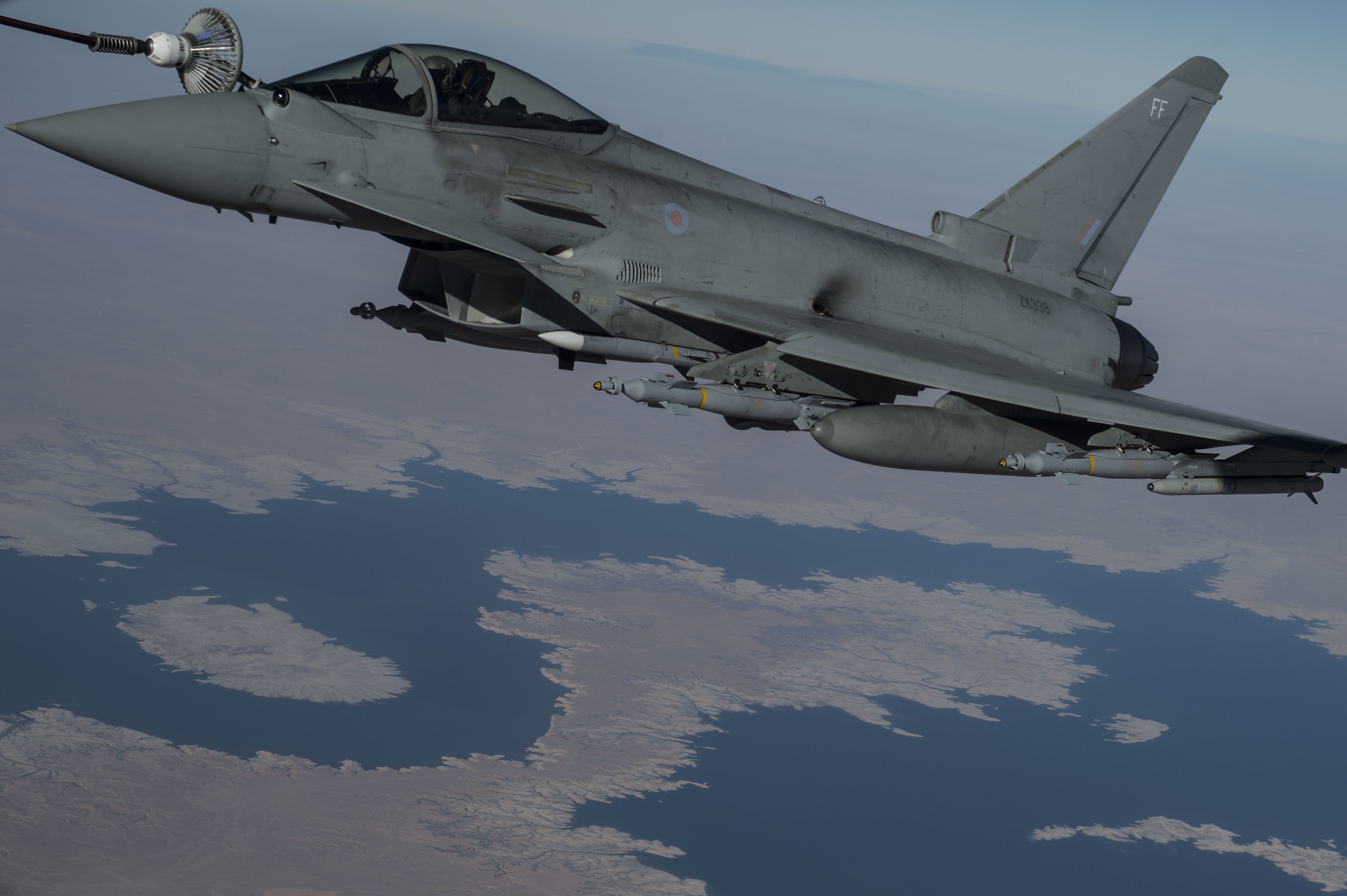
A Typhoon FGR4 is refueled over Iraq by the US Air Force on 22 December 2015.

The Royal Air Force began conducting armed sorties over Iraq immediately after parliamentary approval, using its six Tornado GR4s stationed at RAF Akrotiri in Cyprus. The first airstrike took place on 30 September 2014, when a pair of Tornado GR4s attacked an ISIL heavy weapons position using a Paveway IV laser-guided bomb and an armed pickup truck using a Brimstone missile.

In October 2014, a further two Tornado GR4 strike aircraft and an undisclosed number of armed MQ-9 Reaper unmanned aerial vehicles joined the operation. The first MQ-9 Reaper airstrike took place on 10 October 2014. Elsewhere, the Royal Navy tasked Type 45 destroyer HMS Defender to escort the US Navy aircraft carrier USS George H.W. Bush (CVN-77) whilst it launched aircraft into Iraq and Syria.

According to Defence Secretary Michael Fallon, the UK had conducted a "huge number of missions" over Iraq by 13 December 2014, a number which was "second only to the United States" and "five times as many as France". By 5 February 2015, the UK had contributed 6% of all coalition airstrikes in Iraq – a contribution second only to the United States – which the Defence Select Committee nevertheless described as "modest".

By 26 September 2015, a full year after the operation first began, Tornado and Reaper aircraft had flown over 1,300 missions against ISIL and had conducted more than 300 airstrikes, killing more than 330 ISIL fighters. The aircraft had released a combined 311 AGM-114 Hellfire missiles, 117 Brimstone missiles and 540 Paveway IV laser-guided bombs by 24 January 2016. In June 2016, the RAF used its Storm Shadow cruise missiles against ISIL for the first time, attacking a large concrete bunker in Western Iraq.

On 14 March 2017, Forces.net reported that the RAF had conducted more than 1,253 airstrikes in Iraq, a number which remained second only to the United States.

After ISIL were defeated at the Battle of Baghuz Fawqani in March 2019, the RAF only conducted 7 flying missions in the rest of 2019. After a nine-month period of no airstrikes, they resumed once again on 10 April 2020 when two Eurofighter Typhoons, together with an MQ-9 Reaper, identified and engaged ISIL forces in Iraq, about 200 km north of Baghdad. By July 2020, the UK had carried out 40 airstrikes in the past year.

In March 2021, a series of airstrikes were carried out by the RAF against ISIL hidden within caves in Northern Iraq. The initial sorties saw the first-time combat use of the Storm Shadow cruise missile by the Eurofighter Typhoon, followed by up to 20 Paveway IV laser-guided bombs in the days after. The remains of a Storm Shadow cruise missile were later discovered in Northern Iraq and reported in Iraqi media, however it is not known whether these remains belonged to an RAF missile or one from the French Air Force.

The Royal Navy deployed UK Carrier Strike Group 21, a carrier strike group centred around the aircraft carrier HMS Queen Elizabeth, on a debut operational deployment in June 2021. Operating from the eastern Mediterranean, the aircraft carrier launched its embarked RAF and US Marine Corps F-35B Lightning II multirole combat aircraft over Iraq and Syria. Whilst the MOD made little comment regarding airstrikes, the United States Naval Institute confirmed they had taken place. By early July, the carrier strike group had ended its support and continued on its primary tasking to the Indo-Pacific via the Suez Canal.

Between January 2019 and January 2021, British airstrikes in Iraq and Syria killed at least 67 ISIS militants and injured a further four.

In 2022, the UK conducted a total of two airstrikes in Iraq. In 2023, the UK struck two ISIL targets in northeastern Iraq in support of an Iraqi security forces operation.

On 21 April 2024, a pair of Typhoons struck a rocket launcher which was targeting coalition forces in northwestern Iraq.

=== Training mission ===
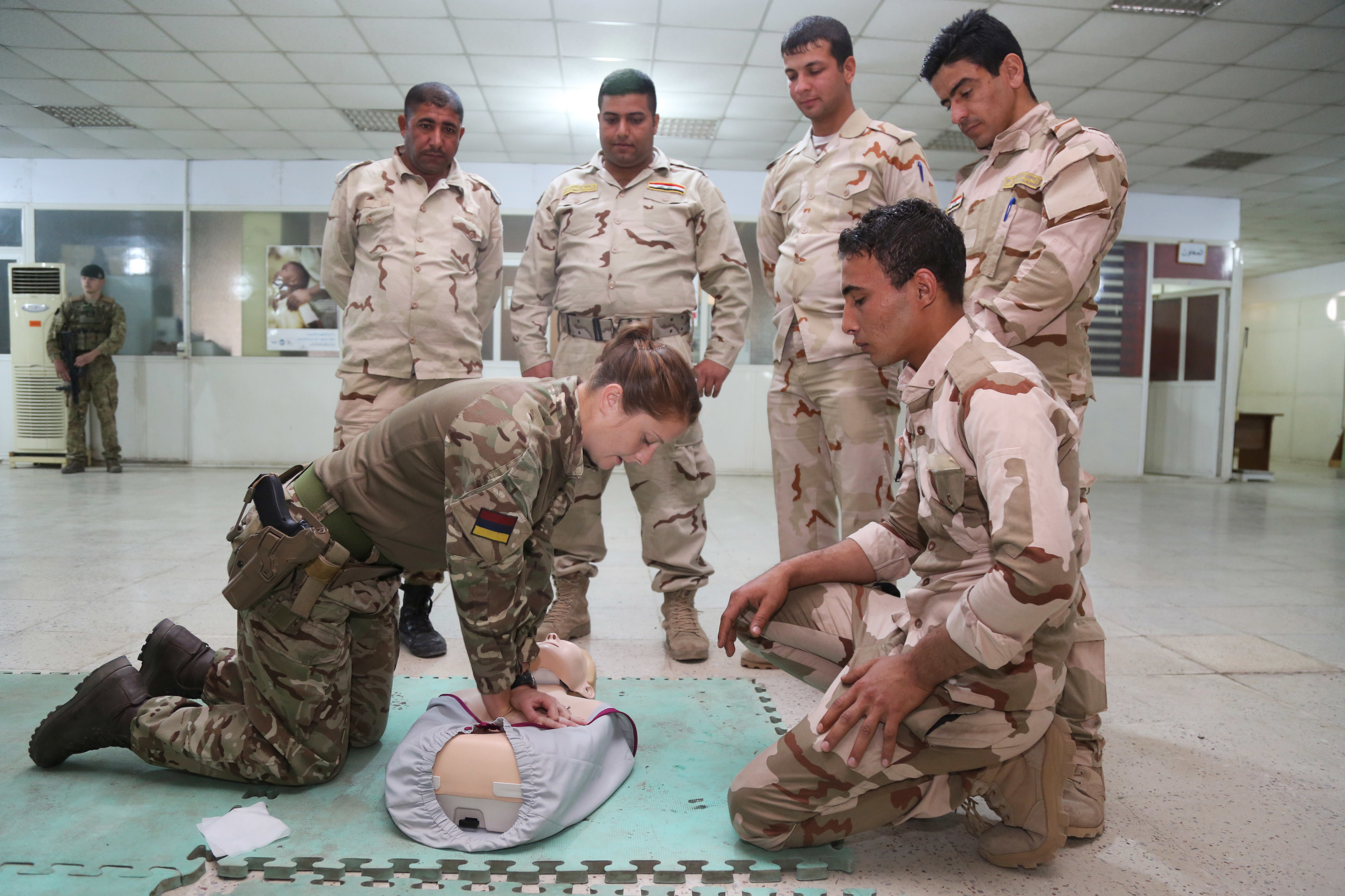
A member of the Royal Army Medical Corps demonstrating chest compressions to Iraqi soldiers.

In October 2014, the British Government agreed to send 12 members of the 2nd Battalion, The Yorkshire Regiment (2 YORKS) into Irbil to train Peshmerga on how to use UK-supplied heavy machine guns. The number of British troops involved in this training mission eventually rose from 12 to 50 before being bolstered by an additional batch of British troops numbering in the "low hundreds". It was also disclosed that a small team of "combat-ready" troops were sent along with them to provide force protection. By 2016, an additional 30 troops were deployed to train Iraqi forces, which brought the total number of deployed British troops in Iraq to 300. The British Army had also trained over 31,000 Iraqi and Peshmerga fighters.

In 2016, a squadron of up to 80 Royal Engineers was deployed to help construct better training facilities at the Al Asad Airbase. This was followed by a six-month deployment of 44 Royal Engineers of 5 Armoured Engineer Squadron, 22 Engineer Regiment to Al Asad Airbase in 2017. This brought the number of British personnel at the base to more than 300 and the total in Iraq to around 600.

In January 2017, the BBC reported that L/Cpl Scott Hetherington died in a "shooting accident" at Camp Taji, Iraq. Hetherington was a member of the Force Protection Platoon, Blenheim Company, 2nd Battalion Duke of Lancaster's Regiment; he was the first British soldier to die in Iraq in almost eight years. About 150 soldiers from the battalion were being deployed to Iraq for a period of six months, forming part of a 500-strong force being sent to train Iraqi and Kurdish security forces.

In January 2020, amid heightened tensions between the United States and Iran following the Baghdad International Airport airstrike, which killed the senior Iranian military commander, Qasem Soleimani, the British Army training mission in Iraq was temporarily suspended due to safety concerns. Around two months later, a rocket attack on the Iraqi military base Camp Taji, hosting British, American and Australian military personnel, resulted in the death of three soldiers, including one Briton. She was later identified as L/Cpl Brodie Gillon of the Royal Army Medical Corps and reservist of the Scottish and North Irish Yeomanry. At the time of the attack, the training mission was still suspended and had been scaled down in response to the COVID-19 pandemic. An Iranian-backed militia was believed to be responsible for the attack and was subsequently targeted by an American retaliatory airstrike.

Elements of the Welsh Guards were deployed to Erbil, Iraq between June and December 2022.

In February 2023, the 1st Battalion Grenadier Guards returned from an operational tour in Iraq, providing protection for UK personnel deployed on Operation Shader.

=== Ground support ===
Following the start of aerial operations, there was public concern regarding mission creep and the involvement of British combat troops in what some feared could become another protracted ground war, similar to the Iraq War and the War in Afghanistan. The British government made persistent assurances that no British troops would be committed on the ground in a combat role, instead focusing on training and non-combat support. The only exception to this was the deployment of 2nd Battalion, The Yorkshire Regiment (2 YORKS) to Irbil which helped secure an area for a possible helicopter refugee rescue mission in 2014. The battalion, which at the time was the Cyprus-based Theatre Reserve Battalion (TRB) for Operation Herrick in Afghanistan, had left Irbil within 24 hours. Beyond the scope of regular ground forces, British special forces are widely believed to have been involved, including in combat.

=== Outcome ===
On 10 December 2017, Iraqi Prime Minister Haider al-Abadi announced that Islamic State had been completely "evicted" from Iraq after losing control of all of its territory. Despite this, British Defence Secretary Ben Wallace insisted that ISIL remained the "most significant threat" to the UK and its potential resurgence in future remained a concern. For that reason, UK military aircraft continue to patrol the skies over Iraq almost daily.

On 28 September 2024, the UK's role in Iraq and Syria would evolve following the conclusion of the Global Coalition's military mission against ISIL. Over the following year, the UK would transition into a bilateral security partnership with Iraq and cease further missions there.

== Syria ==
=== Preceding events ===
Prior to Operation Shader, the House of Commons voted on whether or not take military action against the Syrian Government in response to the Ghouta chemical attack in 2013. The House voted against taking military action — the first time a British government had been blocked from taking military action by Parliament. Whilst the outcome was widely reported as a defeat for Prime Minister David Cameron, a spokesman for the Prime Minister nevertheless stated that he had "not ruled anything out" in relation to airstrikes against ISIL. Cameron later elaborated that there was a case for airstrikes in Syria but conceded that any airstrikes would require another House of Commons vote unless it was to prevent a humanitarian catastrophe.

In 2013, two British aid workers, David Haines and Alan Henning, were kidnapped by armed groups in two separate incidents in Syria whilst carrying out humanitarian aid work. In September 2014, ISIL executed an American hostage and threatened to execute Haines if the United States did not end its military interventions in Iraq and Syria. Prime Minister David Cameron condemned the terrorists and stated the UK would "never give into terrorism", adding that ISIL would "be squeezed out of existence". ISIL subsequently released a video of Haines being beheaded by an ISIL executioner — an as-yet unidentified British national which the media named Jihadi John. Cameron reacted by stating: "We will do everything in our power to hunt down these murderers and ensure they face justice, however long it takes." An intense manhunt involving MI5, Scotland Yard and the CIA began in an effort to identify John. In October 2014, John executed Henning in retaliation for the UK carrying out airstrikes in Iraq. John was subsequently identified as Mohammed Emwazi, a Kuwaiti-born British national who previously lived in London.

In 2014, the Ministry of Defence confirmed that surveillance missions were being flown over Syria by the Royal Air Force, including via MQ-9 Reaper drones based in Cyprus. In November, a US drone strike targeted and killed Emwazi in Raqqa with support from the Royal Air Force. Prime Minister David Cameron confirmed his death and stated it was an "act of self-defence" achieved through working "hand in glove, round the clock" with the United States.

In 2015, Cameron made repeated calls for airstrikes in Syria following the 2015 Sousse attacks which were perpetrated by ISIL and left 30 Britons dead. These calls were echoed by the Defence Secretary, Michael Fallon, who claimed that there was an "illogicality" of British forces observing the Iraq-Syria border whilst ISIL did not. Fallon stated that the UK did not need the backing of Parliament to launch airstrikes in Syria but the House of Commons would have the final say. The Prime Minister later stated that the UK was committed to destroying the caliphate in both Iraq and Syria. It later emerged that British pilots were taking part in airstrikes in Syria whilst embedded with US and Canadian forces. However, British forces themselves remained committed to surveillance and, by November, its Reaper drones had been responsible for 30% of all coalition aerial surveillance in Syria.

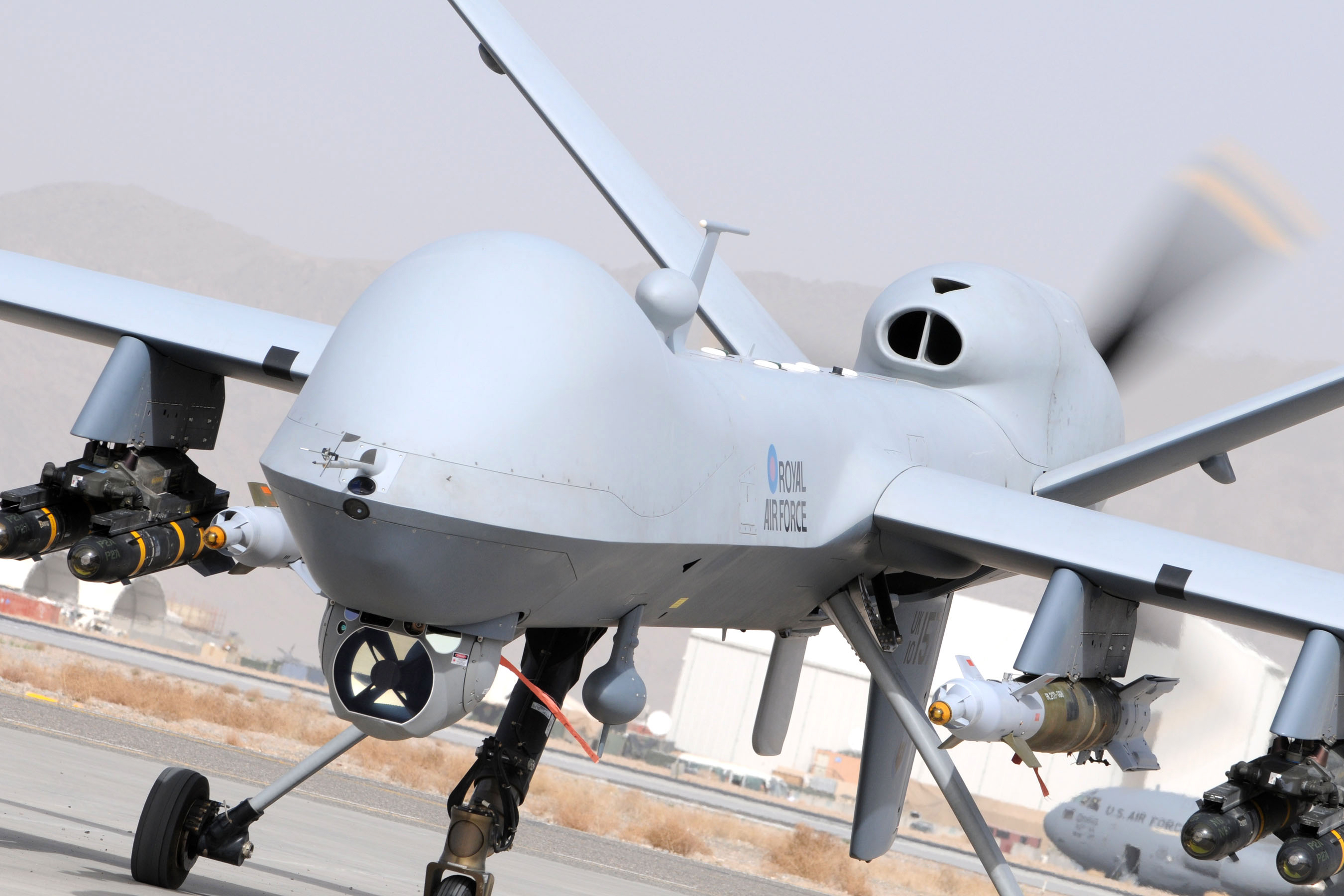
An RAF MQ-9 Reaper, similar to the one used in the strike against Rayeed Khan and Rahoul Amin in Syria.

In September 2015, Prime Minister David Cameron announced that two British-born Islamic State fighters, Rayeed Khan and Rahoul Amin, were targeted and killed in Syria by a Royal Air Force Reaper drone. During a statement in Parliament, the Prime Minister explained that it was a "lawful act of self defence" as the two fighters had been plotting attacks against the United Kingdom. The Ministry of Defence later clarified that the strike was not part of Operation Shader.

=== Airstrikes ===
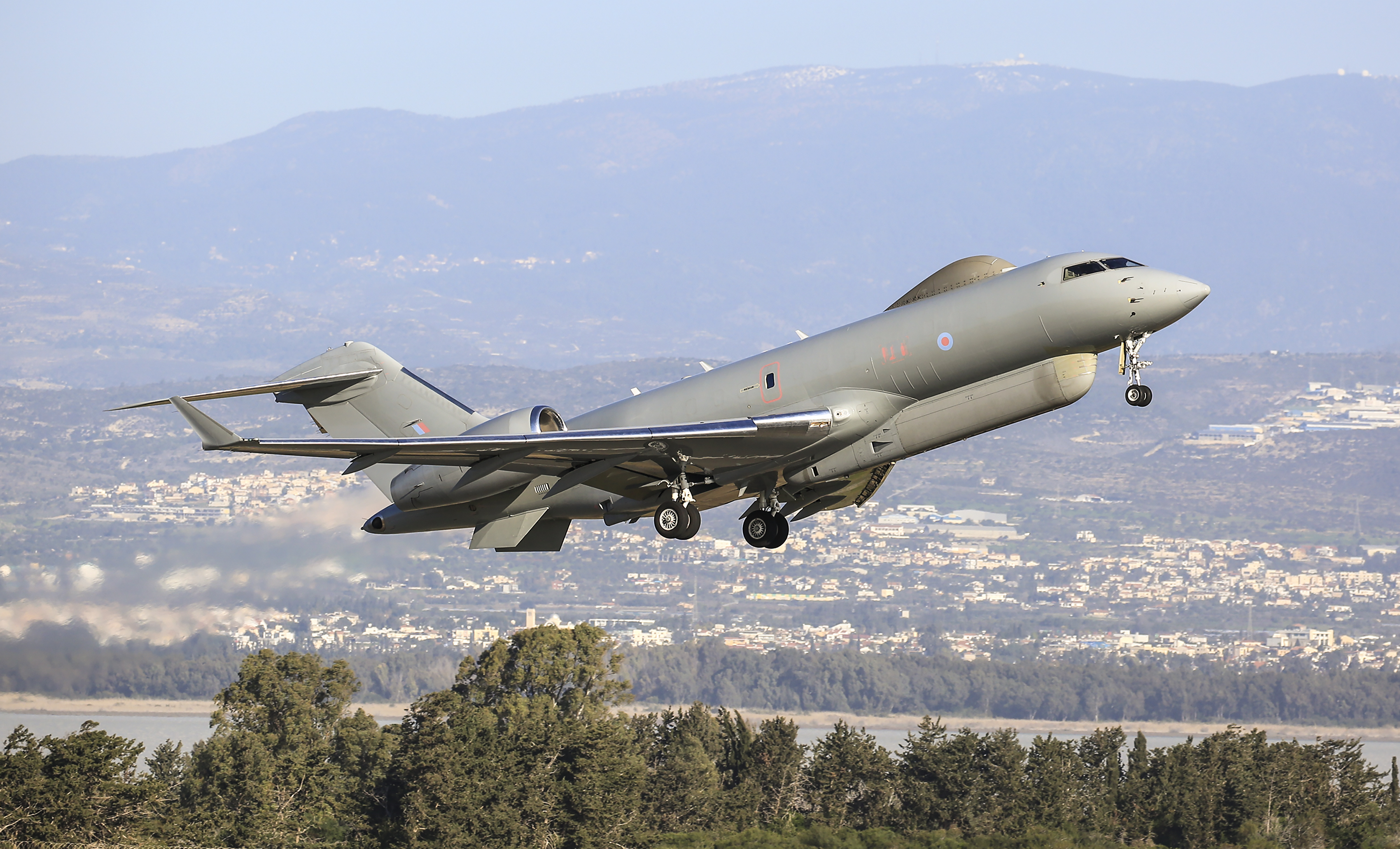
A Sentinel R1 taking off from RAF Akrotiri in support of Operation Shader.

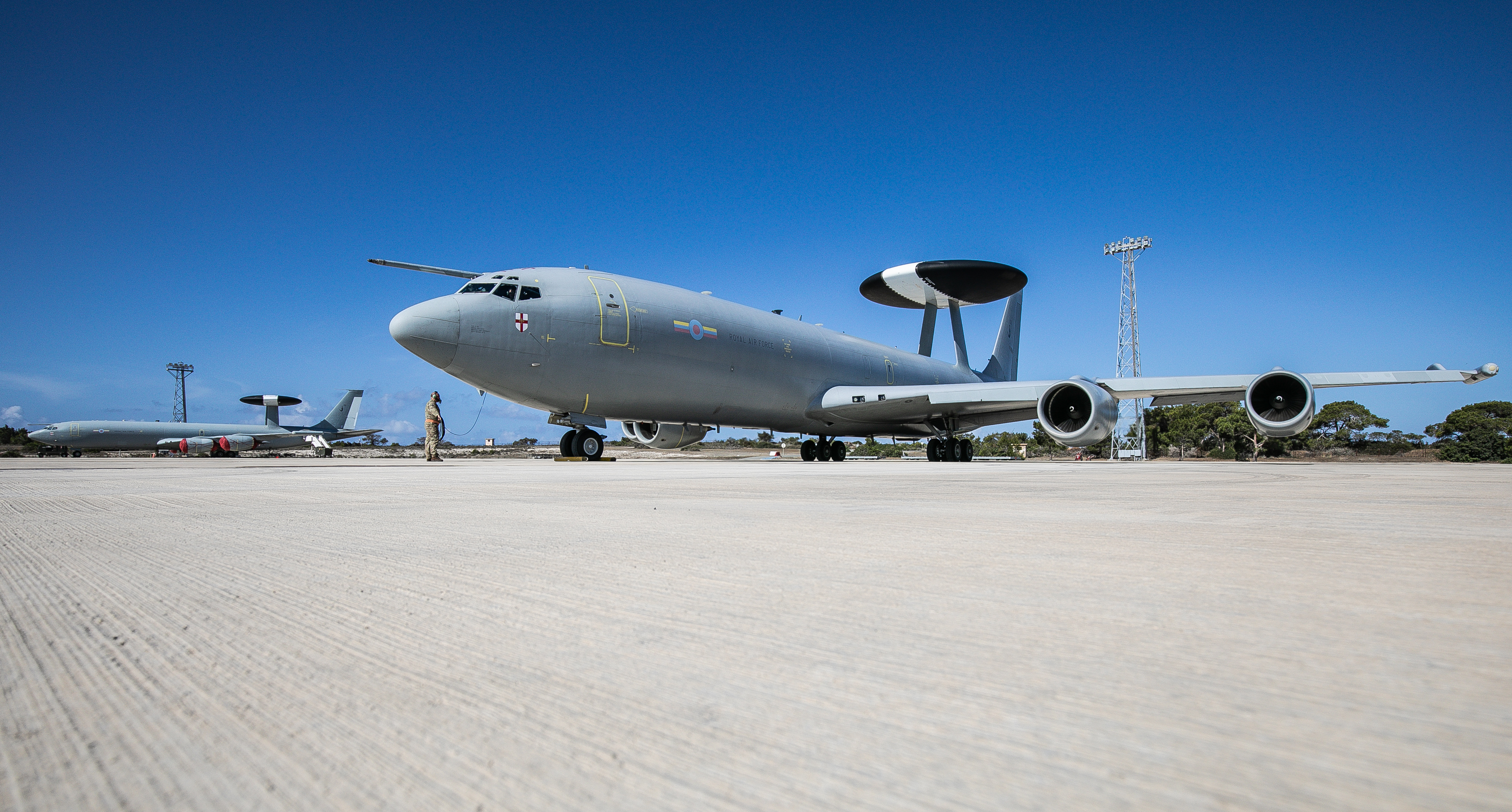
Two Boeing E-3 Sentry aircraft at RAF Akrotiri.

In November 2015, following the November 2015 Paris attacks and the adoption of United Nations Security Council Resolution 2249, David Cameron made his first case to Parliament for the UK to conduct airstrikes against ISIL in Syria. He argued that the United Kingdom would be safer by conducting airstrikes and that the UK could not outsource its security to allies. The Prime Minister went on to state that he would not hold a vote on airstrikes until he was sure he could win it. In the days following, French President François Hollande and French Defense Secretary Jean-Yves Le Drian made calls for Britain to join airstrikes. This was followed by an appeal from the Russian Ambassador to the UK, Alexander Vladimirovich Yakovenko.

In December 2015, the House of Commons held a ten-hour debate on participating in airstrikes against ISIL in Syria with a final vote. The debate ended with 397 votes in favour of airstrikes and 223 against. Hours after the vote, four Tornado GR4 strike aircraft left Cyprus and attacked ISIL positions in Syria for the first time, aided by a Voyager aerial refuelling tanker and an MQ-9 Reaper drone. The aircraft attacked Omar oilfield in Eastern Syria, one of the largest sources of financial income for ISIL. Defence Secretary Michael Fallon subsequently announced that the Royal Air Force would be "doubling its strike force" with six Eurofighter Typhoon multi-role fighters and two more Tornado GR4 strike aircraft.

By 24 January 2016, the RAF had used 7 Hellfire missiles, 9 Brimstone missiles and 34 Paveway IV laser-guided bombs in Syria.

Forces.net reported that as of 14 March 2017, Britain had carried out 85 strikes in Syria, a number second only to the United States.

In June 2021, the Royal Navy deployed a carrier strike group, UK Carrier Strike Group 21, centred around the aircraft carrier HMS Queen Elizabeth to support anti-ISIL operations. A joint force of RAF and US Marine Corps F-35B Lightning II combat aircraft began launching combat sorties over Syria from the aircraft carrier whilst in the eastern Mediterranean. Airstrikes were confirmed by the United States Naval Institute. By early July, the carrier strike group had withdrawn and headed east via the Suez Canal.

On 14 December 2021, an RAF Typhoon shot down a hostile drone which posed a threat to Coalition forces at the Al-Tanf military base in Southern Syria. It was the RAF's first air-to-air engagement in combat conducted by a Typhoon. An ASRAAM short-range air-to-air missile was used in the engagement.

In December 2022, the RAF carried out a drone strike which killed a leading member of ISIL in al-Bab, Syria. The individual's activity was related to chemical and biological weapons. This was the only UK airstrike to occur in Syria in 2022.

In June 2024, the RAF carried out a drone strike against a known member of ISIL in an undisclosed area of the Syrian desert. This was followed by a similar strike in Aleppo during March 2025. In September that year, the RAF carried out two precision counter-ISIL strikes in Syria using remotely piloted aircraft, eliminating two known Islamic State terrorists in northern and central Syria.

On 3 January 2026, a number of RAF Typhoon FGR4 jets, operating alongside French aircraft, carried out a joint precision strike on an underground Islamic State weapons facility near Palmyra in central Syria.

=== Training mission ===
In 2016, a team of 75 British military trainers were deployed to Turkey and other nearby countries in the anti-ISIL coalition to assist with the US-led training programme in Syria. The training programme provided small arms, infantry tactics and medical training to Syrian moderate opposition forces for over three years. Additionally, British forces reportedly helped in the building up of a mechanised battalion in Southern Syria, consisting of tribal fighters to combat Bashar al-Assad's army.

=== Ground support ===
In May 2015, surveillance by UK Special Forces had reportedly confirmed the presence of a senior ISIL leader, named Abu Sayyaf, in al-Amr, Syria, after which US Special Operations Forces conducted an operation to capture him. The operation resulted in his death and the capture of his wife Umm Sayyaf. During the same year, UK Special Forces reportedly killed six ISIL fighters during a rescue operation. It was also reported that the UK had supplied anti-ISIL forces with 500,000 rounds of ammunition.

In 2016, The Telegraph reported that UK Special Forces had been operating on the frontline in Syria; in particular in May when they frequently crossed the border from Jordan to support a New Syrian Army unit composed of former Syrian Special Forces defending the village of al-Tanf against ISIL attacks. The New Syrian Army captured the village in that month and faced regular ISIL attacks. British forces also helped rebuild the base following a suicide attack. The New Syrian Army acknowledged that UK Special Forces had provided training, weapons and other equipment; an independent source confirmed that UK Special Forces were operating against ISIL in Syria, Iraq and Libya. In August, BBC News released exclusive images showing UK Special Forces operating in Syria. The pictures, which dated from June, were taken following an attack by ISIL on the New Syrian Army base of Al Tanaf and appear to be showing UK Special Forces securing the base's perimeter. UK Special Forces in Syria were reportedly engaged in wide-ranging roles that included surveillance, advisory and combat, in relatively small numbers.

In 2018, a member of UK Special Forces was killed in Syria, along with an American soldier, by "explosives" carried by allied American forces following an accidental detonation. This was the first British soldier to die in active duty during operations against ISIL.

In 2019, two British special forces soldiers were reportedly injured in an attack carried out by ISIL while supporting the Syrian Democratic Forces' Deir ez-Zor campaign; one Kurd also died.

=== Outcome ===
On 23 March 2019, following the Battle of Baghuz Fawqani, Islamic State lost its final significant territory in Syria to the Syrian Democratic Forces (SDF) backed by the US and its coalition partners, including the UK. This was widely announced as the "defeat of ISIL" by the SDF and its allies. British Prime Minister Theresa May praised the courage of the British Armed Forces and its allies and stated: "The liberation of the last Daesh-held territory wouldn't have been possible without the immense courage of UK military and our allies". Major General Chris Ghika, Deputy Commander Strategy and Information of CJTF-OIR, stated that "Operation Shader would remain" as ISIL was not "leaderless or rudderless" despite its losses. He added that he could not predict how the losses would affect the terror threat posed by ISIL to the UK.

== Libya ==
In 2015, following the rise of Islamic State in Libya, Prime Minister David Cameron confirmed the UK was prepared to intervene militarily, especially if there was an imminent threat to British lives. However, the intervention would be pending the formation of a stable unity government in Libya. The Royal Air Force began carrying out reconnaissance missions over Libya, which the media reported as being in preparation for an intervention. One such reconnaissance flight, which involved a Boeing RC-135, reportedly targeted and jammed an Islamic State communications frequency emitting from a stronghold in Sirte. Leaked reports and Libyan officials have also confirmed the presence of UK Special Forces on the ground and in combat. An official statement by King Abdullah II of Jordan corroborated these reports and disclosed UK Special Forces had carried out joint operations with their Jordanian counterparts. Additionally, 20 British troops were deployed to neighbouring Tunisia to help guard its border with Libya.

== Deployed forces ==
In 2019, there were approximately 1,350 UK military personnel deployed on Operation Shader, with approximately 400 based in Iraq.

=== British Army ===
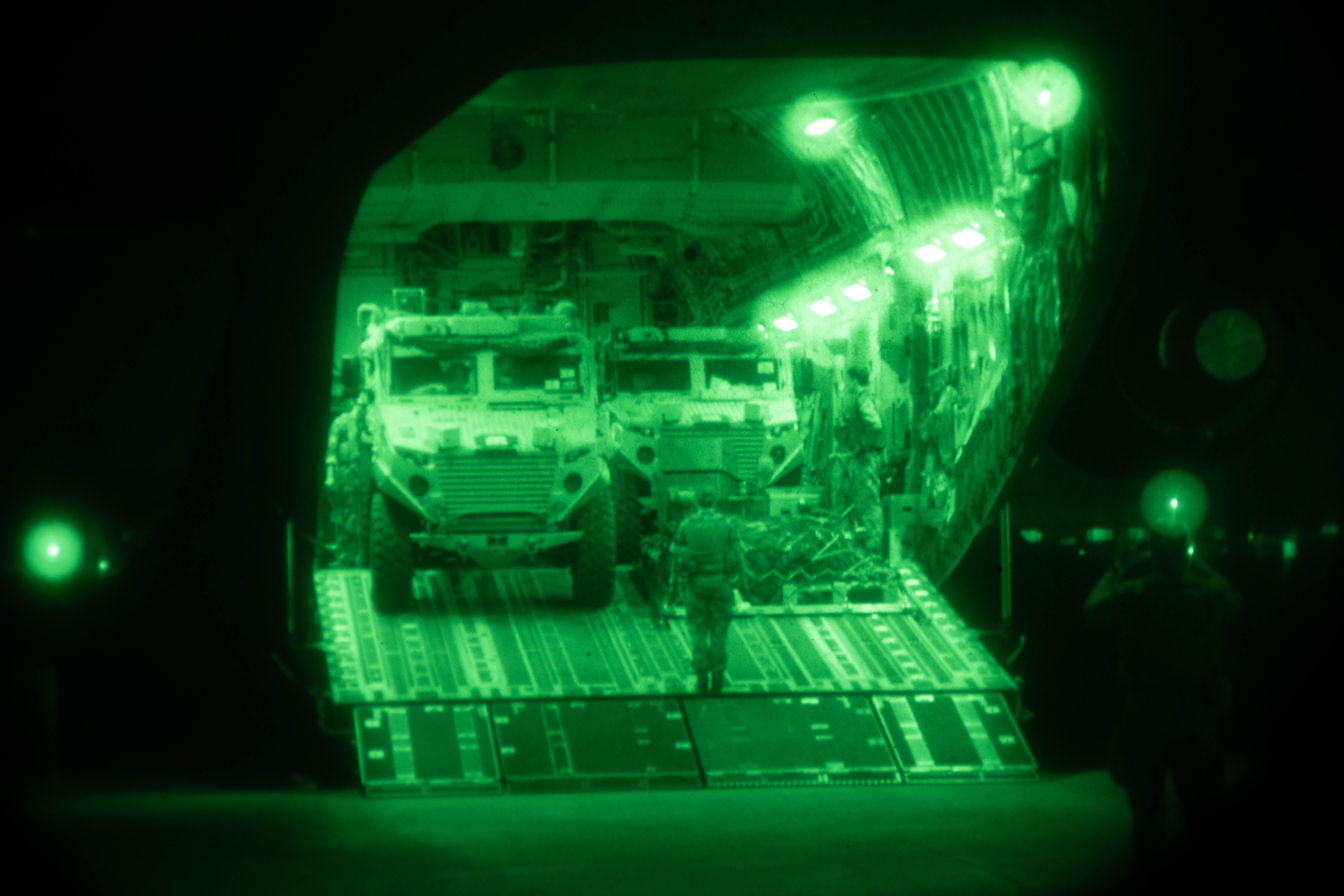
Foxhound armoured patrol vehicles arrive in Iraq.

The British Army had a total of 1,920 personnel deployed in 2018. This included at least one infantry battalion on a six-month rotation to provide training support and force protection. These units operate from three main sites in Iraq: Camp Taji near Baghdad, Union III in Baghdad and Erbil in Iraqi Kurdistan. British troops have also been based at Al Asad Airbase and Besmaya Range Complex.

The units involved have included:

- 2nd Battalion, The Yorkshire Regiment (2 YORKS) (during 2014)
- 2nd Battalion, The Princess of Wales's Royal Regiment (2 PWRR) (during 2015)
- 1st Battalion, The Rifles (1 RIFLES) (July 2015 – December 2016)
- 4th Battalion, The Rifles (October 2016 – March 2017)
- 2nd Battalion, The Duke of Lancaster's Regiment (2 LANCS) (December 2016 – July 2017)
- The Highlanders, 4th Battalion, Royal Regiment of Scotland (4 SCOTS) (July 2017 – December 2017)
- The Royal Highland Fusiliers, 2nd Battalion, The Royal Regiment of Scotland (2 SCOTS) (December 2017 – June 2018).
- 5 Armoured Engineer Squadron, 22 Engineer Regiment (during 2017)
- 2nd Battalion, The Rifles (2 RIFLES) (July 2017 – January 2018)
- 3rd Battalion, The Rifles (3 RIFLES) (November 2018 – July 2019)
- 1st Battalion, Grenadier Guards (June 2018 – November 2018)
- 1st Battalion, Irish Guards (2020)
- 1st Battalion, Welsh Guards (November 2021)

=== Royal Air Force ===
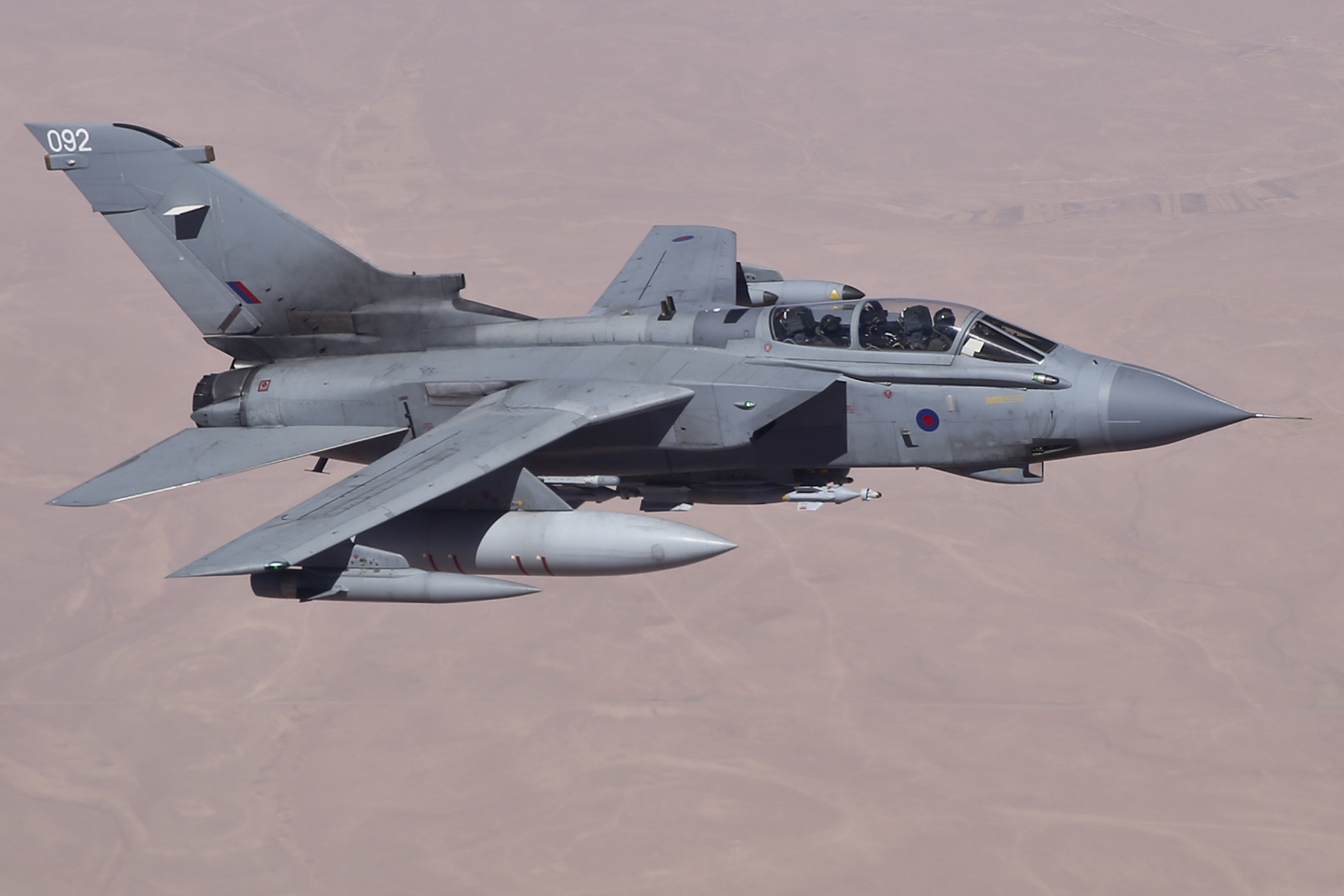
RAF Tornado GR4 over Iraq on an armed reconnaissance mission.

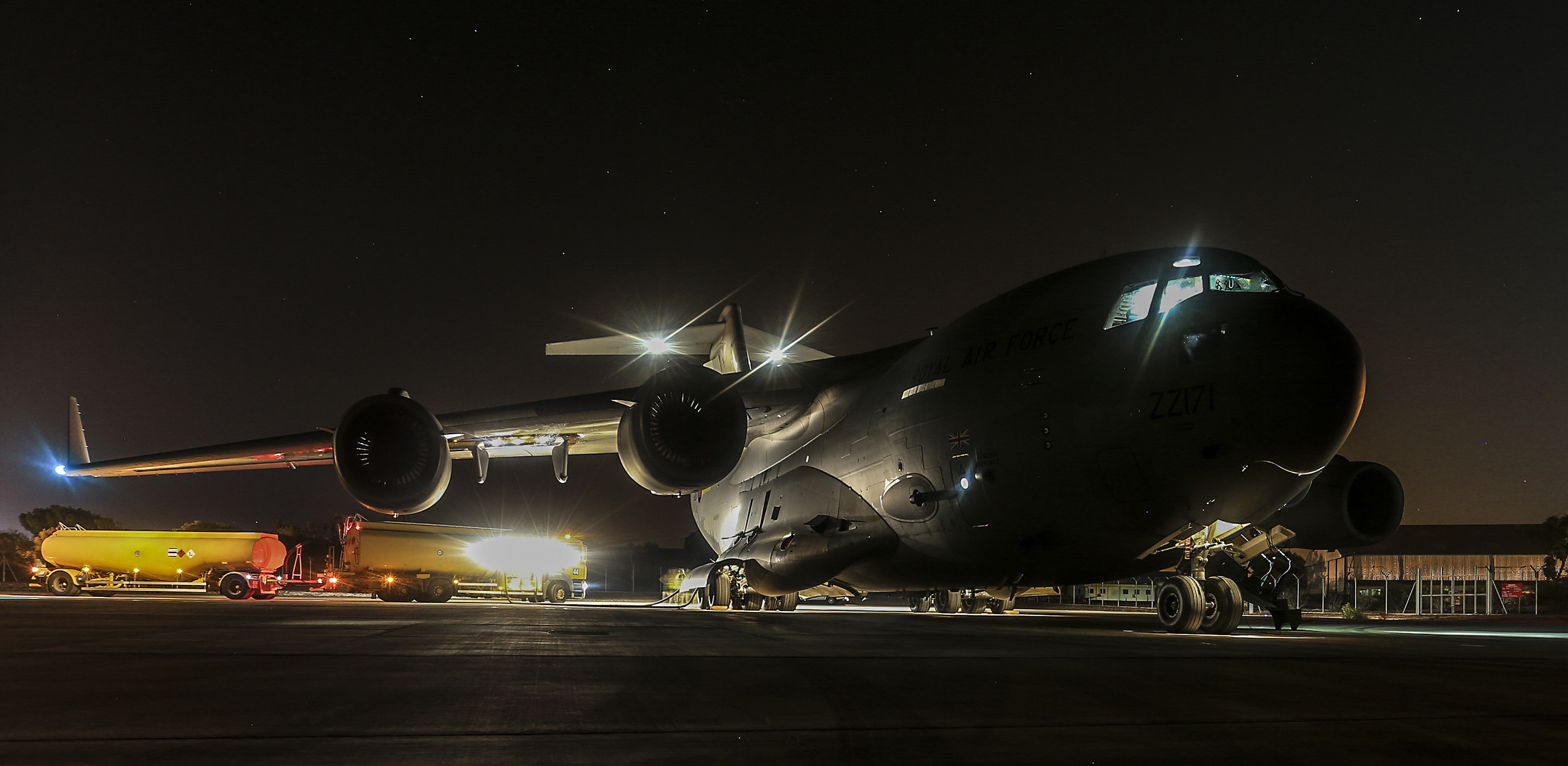
An RAF C-17 aircraft being refueled at RAF Brize Norton before delivering Iraq-bound aid to RAF Akrotiri in Cyprus.

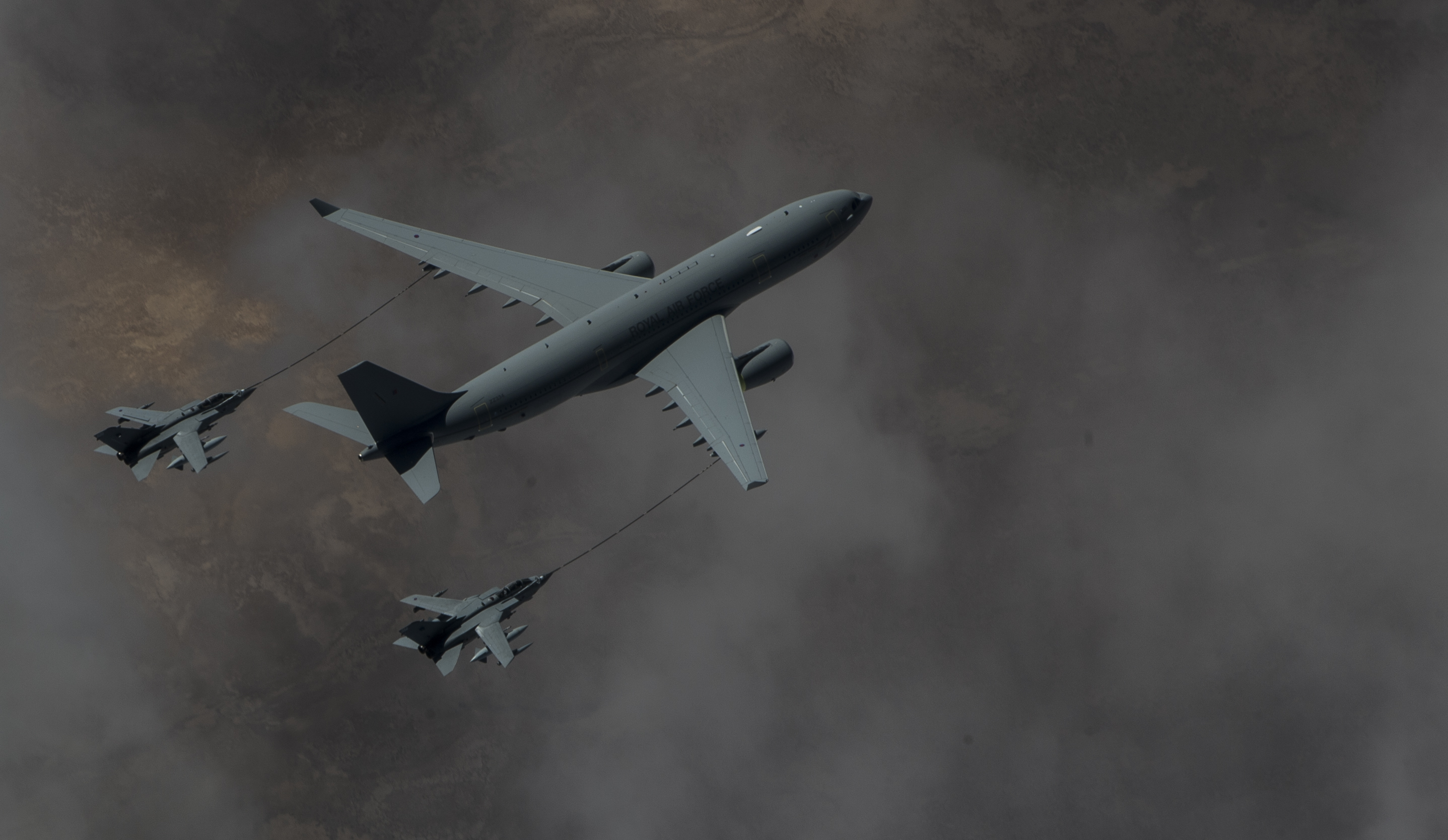
An RAF Voyager tanker refuels two Tornado GR4s over Iraq on 4 March 2015.

In 2018, the RAF had 1,950 personnel deployed on Operation Shader. No. 83 Expeditionary Air Group based at Al Udeid Air Base in Qatar was responsible for command and control and had four Expeditionary Air Wings assigned to it.

- No. 83 Expeditionary Air Group
  - No. 901 Expeditionary Air Wing at Al Udeid Air Base in Qatar
    - 2 x RC-135W Airseeker reconnaissance aircraft from No. 51 Squadron stationed at Al Udeid Air Base in Qatar
  - No. 903 Expeditionary Air Wing at RAF Akrotiri in Cyprus comprising:
    - 9 x Typhoon FGR4 multirole fighter aircraft (6 active, 3 reserve). Bolstered by additional aircraft in April 2024 due to tensions with Iran.
    - 1 x Hercules C4/C5 transport aircraft
    - 2 x Voyager KC3 tanker aircraft Bolstered by additional aircraft in April 2024 due to tensions with Iran.
  - 10 x MQ-9A Reaper unmanned combat aerial vehicles from 13 Squadron and No. 39 Squadron stationed in Kuwait
  - 1 x Atlas C1 transport aircraft from No. LXX Squadron
  - 1 x C-17A Globemaster III transport aircraft from No. 99 Squadron
  - 1 x Shadow R1 reconnaissance aircraft from No 14 Squadron
  - Elements of the RAF Police
  - Elements of No. 51 Squadron RAF Regiment
  - Elements of No II Squadron RAF Regiment
  - Elements of Tactical Supply Wing
  - Elements of 1 Air Mobility Wing

Withdrawn assets

- 4 x Chinook HC4 transport helicopters (August 2014)
- 1 x Lockheed C-130 Hercules transport aircraft (August 2014)
- 8 x Tornado GR4 strike aircraft (August 2014 – February 2019)
- 2 x Sentinel R1 ISTAR aircraft from No. V(AC) Squadron (March 2015 – February 2021)
- 6 x F-35B Lightning from No. 617 Squadron RAF (June 2019 – July 2019)
- 2 x Sentry AEW1 AEW&C aircraft from No. 8 Squadron (March 2015 – August 2021)

=== Royal Navy ===
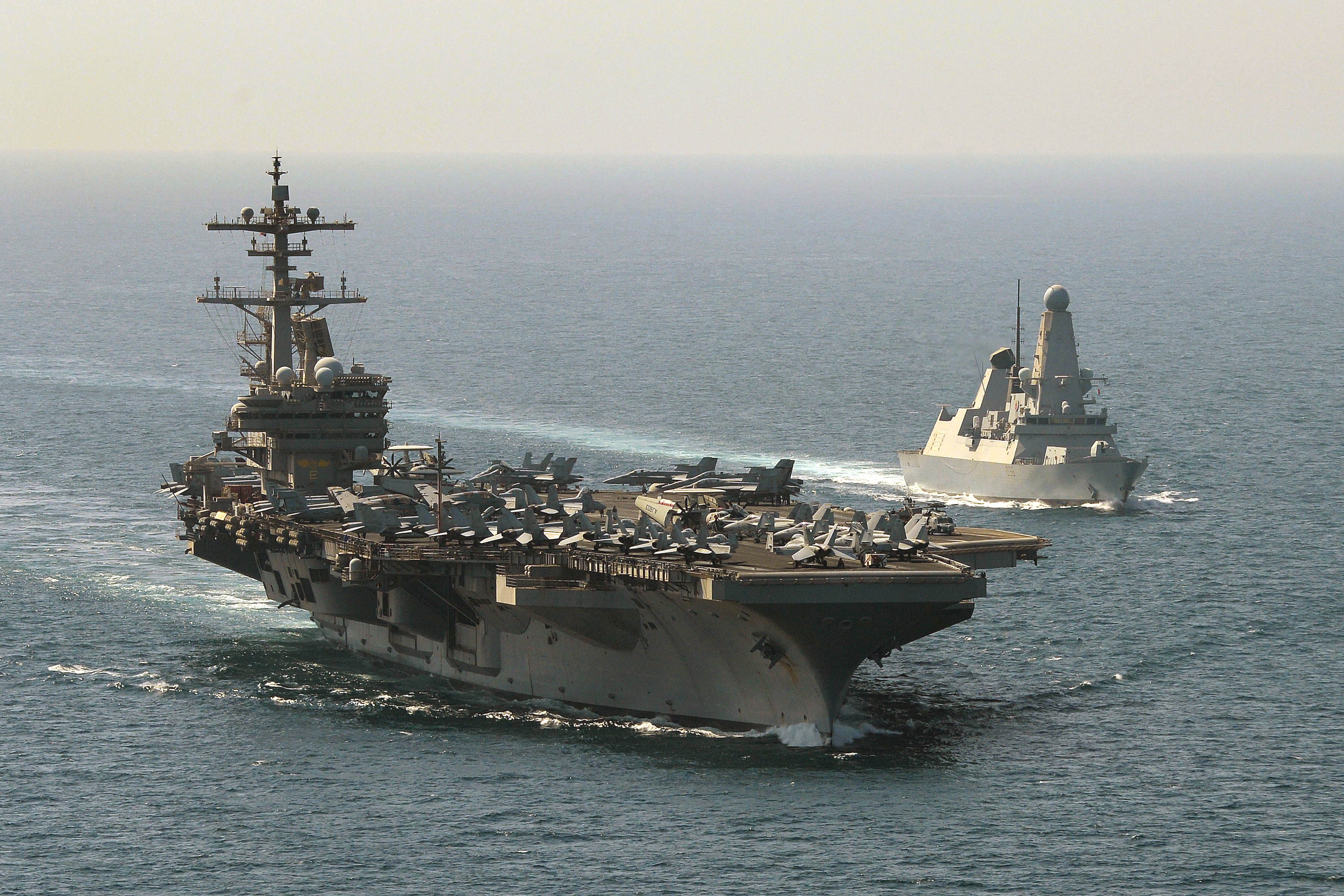
Royal Navy destroyer HMS Defender (D36) escorts the American aircraft carrier USS George H.W. Bush (CVN-77) through the Middle East during Operation Shader.

The Royal Navy routinely deploys a frigate or destroyer to the Middle East to carry out maritime security operations in support of Operation Kipion. These ships have occasionally provided escort to allied carrier strike groups involved in strike operations. In June 2021, the Royal Navy contributed its own carrier strike group and carried out maritime strike operations against ISIL for the first time. Additionally, the Royal Fleet Auxiliary has resupplied coalition warships and, in 2016, operated airborne surveillance and control (ASaC) helicopters.

- Type 45 destroyers
  - HMS Defender (October – December 2014, December 2015 – July 2016)
  - HMS Dauntless (January – May 2015)
  - HMS Duncan (July – December 2015, April 2019)
  - HMS Daring (August 2016 – 2017)
  - HMS Diamond (September – November 2018)
- Type 23 frigates
  - HMS Kent (December 2014 – May 2015)
  - HMS St Albans (January – June 2016)
- An unnamed Astute-class or Trafalgar-class nuclear-powered attack submarine in 2014, likely HMS Tireless.
- Fort Victoria-class replenishment oiler RFA Fort Victoria (2016)
  - Sea King ASaC7 helicopters
- Fort Rosalie-class replenishment ship RFA Fort Rosalie (2018)
- UK Carrier Strike Group 21 (June – July 2021)
  - Queen Elizabeth-class aircraft carrier HMS Queen Elizabeth
    - 8 x F-35B Lightning multirole combat aircraft from No. 617 Squadron RAF
    - 10 x F-35B Lightning multirole combat aircraft from US Marine Fighter Attack Squadron 211
    - 2 x Wildcat HMA2 surveillance/attack helicopters
    - 3 x Merlin HC4 transport/rescue helicopters
    - 3 x Merlin HM2 Crowsnest airborne surveillance and control (ASaC) helicopters
  - Type 45 destroyers HMS Diamond and HMS Defender
  - Type 23 frigates HMS Richmond and HMS Kent
  - Astute-class nuclear-powered attack submarine HMS Artful
  - Fort Victoria-class replenishment oiler RFA Fort Victoria
  - Tide-class tanker RFA Tidesurge

=== Tri-Service ===
- United Kingdom Special Forces (UKSF)

== Reactions ==
=== Domestic ===
On 26 September 2014, prior to the parliamentary vote on airstrikes in Iraq, Labour Party MP and Shadow Education Minister, Rushanara Ali, wrote to Labour Leader Ed Miliband to announce her resignation as Shadow Minister, in advance of her deliberate abstention in the vote. In the letter, she wrote that "I appreciate the sincerity of members of parliament from all sides of the House who today support military action against ISIL. I know that British Muslims stand united in the total condemnation of the murders that ISIL have committed. However, there is a genuine belief in Muslim and non-Muslim communities that military action will only create further bloodshed and further pain for the people of Iraq." Ali also added in the letter her concerns that the potential effect military actions might have on the radicalisations of British Muslims had not been thought through.

Anti-war groups, including Stop the War Coalition (StWC), planned a protest march through London on 4 October 2014 in response to Operation Shader. A spokesman of StWC said "All evidence shows that all interventions will just cause more violence". The StWC website argued that the previous two interventions in Iraq had "helped create the current chaos". StWC held another protest in London on 1 December 2015, ahead of the parliamentary vote on airstrikes in Syria.

On 3 December 2015, it was reported that several Labour Party MPs had received death threats and abuse for their support for airstrikes in Syria. On 15 October 2021, long-serving British politician and Member of Parliament (MP) David Amess was attacked and murdered by Islamist Ali Harbi Ali. At court, Ali claimed he attacked Amess in response to him voting in favour of airstrikes in Syria.

=== International ===
The United States welcomed the UK's involvement in the anti-ISIL coalition, with President Barack Obama stating: "Since the beginning of the counter-ISIL campaign the United Kingdom has been one of our most valued partners". Russian Foreign Minister Sergey Lavrov stated he welcomed British airstrikes in Syria, adding "more universal efforts against Islamic State would be more effective". Russian Ambassador to the United Kingdom, Alexander Vladimirovich Yakovenko, made calls for British airstrikes in Iraq.

=== Islamic State ===
On 3 October 2014, ISIL executed British aid worker Alan Henning in response to British airstrikes in Iraq. The group has also claimed responsibility for several terrorist attacks, including the 2017 Manchester Arena bombing and Westminster attack, which it claimed were in retaliation for British military action in the Middle East. In the same year, ISIL also claimed responsibility for the Parsons Green train bombing, with the assailant previously blaming his father's death in Iraq on the UK. ISIL claimed responsibility for the 2020 Streatham stabbing, stating it was in response to its calls to "attack citizens of coalition countries".

== Service medal ==
It was reported that Shadow Defence Secretary Nia Griffith called for a specific award for those who have served in Operation Shader, after visiting troops deployed on the Operation and speaking to armed forces based at RAF Akrotiri. The proposal was submitted for review by the Operational Recognition Board at the Permanent Joint Headquarters.

On 20 September 2017, Defence Secretary Michael Fallon announced that the "Op Shader Medal" will be awarded to those serving in Iraq and Syria. He used the announcement to highlight a lack of recognition for those personnel deployed on the operation, but not located directly within the award criteria; such as Coalition Staff in Kuwait/Turkey and RAF Reaper pilots elsewhere in the Middle East.

Following the announcement, a Defence Instruction and Notice (DIN) was released confirming the eligibility, medal design and production timeline.

The eligibility is 30 Days Continuous Service within the boundaries of Iraq and Syria (45 Days Accumulated) from 9 August 2014 to a date yet to be set.

The medal will remain a "Coin"; the same one was used for the medals for Afghanistan and the Congo. The Awards are differentiated by the Ribbon and the clasp (if any). The Ribbons for all iterations of the OSM bear a central group of 5 stripes in light blue, dark blue and red (a broader band in the centre), to represent the 3 Services. These are flanked by a colour specifically chosen to represent the campaign. In the case of the OSM "Iraq & Syria" a recommendation will be made that this outer stripe is Air Superiority Grey, in recognition of the large number of RAF airframes participating in the operation.

Although entitlement has already been agreed, distribution of the medal will not begin until September 2018 due to financial reasons. All 3,600+ outstanding medals from 2014 to 2018 expected to be received by December 2018.

On 1 July 2018, a pre-release if the OSM (Iraq & Syria) was published by a medal manufacturer, showing the finalised ribbon (MOD Approved) and stating a release date of 18 July 2018. It is expected the full size medals will begin being presentated in line with this date.

On 18 July 2018, Secretary of State for Defence Gavin Williamson presented the Operation Shader Medal, officially known as the Operational Service Medal Iraq and Syria. It has its own distinct ribbon and clasp. He also announced that Her Majesty the Queen had approved an extension to the eligibility criteria for the medal to include personnel outside of the 'conventional area of operations' in Iraq and Syria which would include the Royal Air Force's MQ-9 Reaper crews.

== See also ==
- United Kingdom and ISIL
- War against the Islamic State
- Operation Okra – Australian operation against ISIL
- Operation Impact – Canadian operation against ISIL
- Opération Chammal – French operation against ISIL
- Operation Inherent Resolve – US operation against ISIL
- 2018 missile strikes against Syria - The British, French and American strikes against Syria in 2018
