= Whitchurch High School =

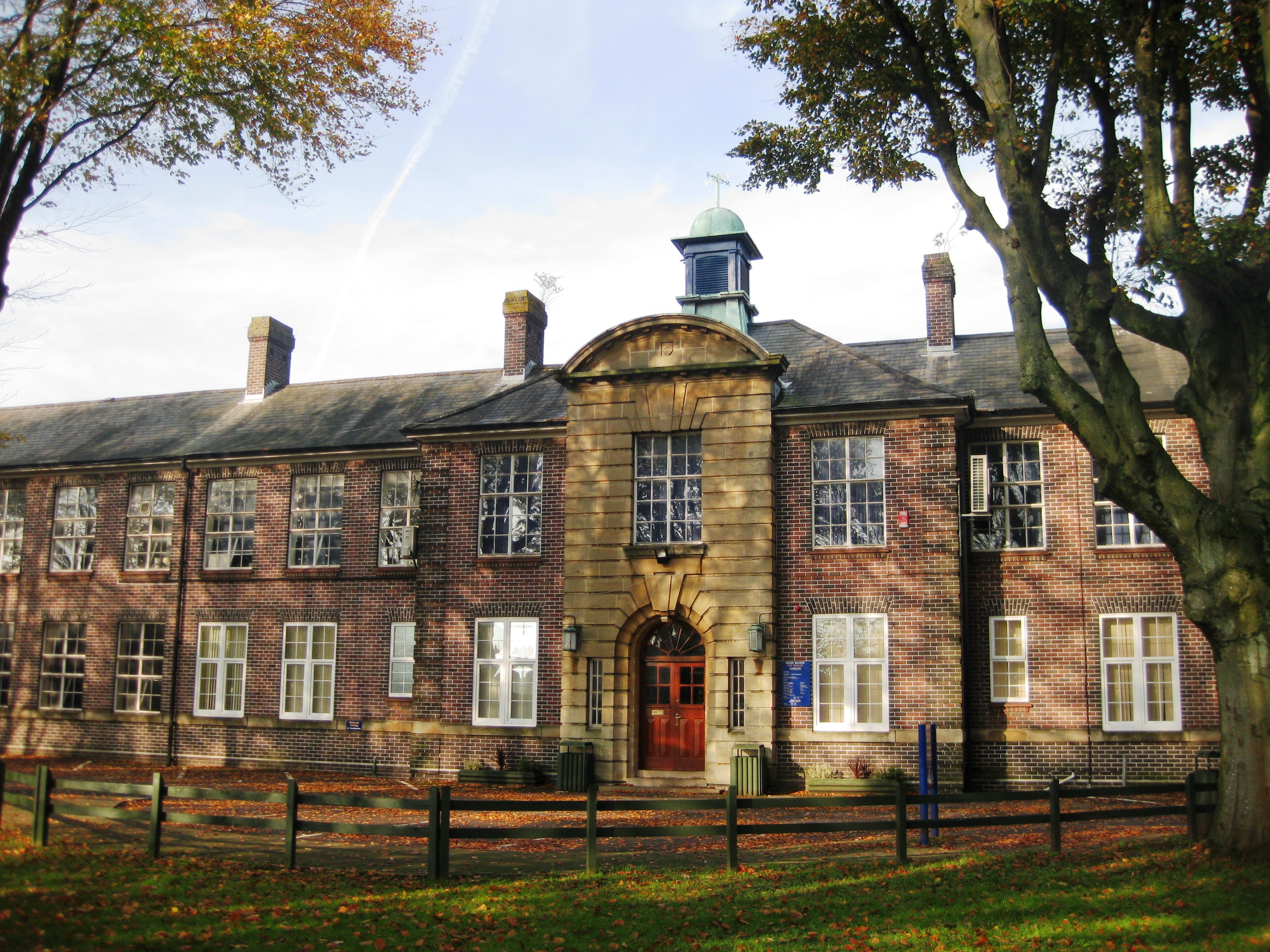

Location
- Penlline Road and Glan-y-Nant Terrace; Whitchurch, Cardiff, CF14 2XJ; Wales; 51°30′48″N 3°13′24″W

Information
- Type: Foundation school; Mainstream Secondary School
- Motto: Learning For Life; (Welsh: Dysgu Gydol Oes)
- Established: 1968 (as comprehensive), 1937 (as grammar school)
- Local authority: Cardiff
- Department for Education URN: 401880 Tables
- Head teacher: Nick John
- Staff: 248
- Gender: Coeducational
- Age: 11 to 18
- Enrolment: 2,400 approx
- Colours: Grey Jumpers/Blazers and White Shirts. Blue and Yellow Ties (Lower school) & Maroon and Yellow Ties (Upper school)
- Predecessor schools: Whitchurch Grammar School; Whitchurch County Secondary School
- Former pupils: Old Whitchonians
- Estyn: Reports
- Website: whitchurchhs.wales

Whitchurch High School (Welsh: Ysgol Uwchradd yr Eglwys Newydd) is a large, co-educational, comprehensive secondary school in the suburb of Whitchurch in Cardiff, Wales.

== Organisation and structure ==
The school is currently the largest in Wales (according to the school's last Estyn report) with 2,400 pupils. In accordance with the three-tier system, it is divided between two sites, known as Upper and Lower. The Lower School site houses Years 7 to 9, with the Upper School providing facilities for years 10 and 11. The Upper School site also includes the Sixth Form Centre (Years 12 & 13).

The school's Leadership Team is composed of the headteacher, two deputy headteachers and five assistant headteachers. The current headteacher is Nick John, who took over from Mark Powell in September 2023.

The school's uniform consists of a yellow and grey blazer, with a blue tie for Lower School and a maroon tie for Upper School.

== Funding ==
In 2015–16 the school budget per pupil was £4,411, amongst the lowest for secondary schools in Cardiff. For the 2017–18 Academic Year this was further reduced, and local media reproduced a letter which had been sent out to parents by the Chair of Governors regarding the financial difficulties the school was experiencing.

== History ==
The first documented school in Whitchurch was on Old Church Road, opposite the now defunct St Mary's Church, adjacent to the Fox and Hounds Public House. Known as 'the Fox school-room', it was started in the nineteenth century, and was joined by a few small privately run establishments to cater for the village's more affluent residents. The first half of the twentieth century saw the rapid growth of Whitchurch as a suburb of Cardiff, and with this growth came the need for more extensive educational provision. Under the terms of the Elementary Education Acts, Glamorgan County Council established the Whitchurch Elementary School on Glan-y-Nant Road (which later became Eglwys Newydd Primary), and then later in the 1930s a Secondary School on Glan-y-Nant Terrace as well as a Grammar School on Penlline Road. The current Whitchurch High School came into being in 1968, following the government circular of 1965, which replaced the existing tripartite system with comprehensive education. The new comprehensive school was created through a merger of the now well-established Whitchurch Grammar School, and Whitchurch County Secondary School, which had become a secondary modern school under the Butler Acts. The former Grammar School building became the Upper School, while the Secondary Modern became the Lower School. Like its predecessors, the school was co-educational and catered for a broad catchment area centred on the suburbs of Whitchurch, Rhiwbina and Tongwynlais in the northern part of Cardiff. The comprehensive school was initially run by Cardiff County Borough until the local government reform of 1974, which included Whitchurch in the new county of South Glamorgan. In 1996, the school reverted to Cardiff County Council, which became a unitary authority. Since merging both sites have seen extensive expansion, although both retain the original buildings as well as extensive playing fields. In September 2011, the school has been granted foundation status by the Welsh Assembly, following controversy over the local authority's proposals to reduce the school's intake.

The school's badge is a white church tower on a blue background with the surround 'Album Monasterium', the Latin name for Whitchurch.

In the 2010s, four former pupils reached the highest levels of their chosen sports; Sam Warburton captained Wales and the British and Irish Lions in Rugby Union, Gareth Bale played football for Real Madrid, Elliot Kear captained Wales in Rugby League and Geraint Thomas won two Olympic gold medals for cycling and won the 2018 Tour de France. All three had been coached by Steve Williams, a teacher at the school.

== Curriculum ==
The school's Sixth Form school offers AS/A2 levels, a few stages of the Welsh Baccalaureate, and some vocational courses. Up until 2012, it was one of the few secondary schools in Wales to offer the International Baccalaureate.

== Facilities ==
- A large, floodlit astroturf pitch on the lower school site, used mainly for hockey and football (1997)
- A sports recreational hall, located on the lower school site, opened by Andrew Mountbatten-Windsor (2004)
- A sports recreational hall with a fitness suite, changing rooms and classrooms located on the upper school site (2006)
- Ten floodlit, five-a-side football pitches with clubhouse and parking located on the lower school site, run by the private company Powerleague and available for community use outside of school hours (2007)
- Playing fields on both the upper and lower school sites which are used for home matches by the schools rugby and football teams
- Traditional school gym with climbing equipment, ropes, gymnastic apparatus and crash mats on the lower school site
- The Dutch Barn, formerly a derelict gym on the lower school site, now converted into a hall used for school assemblies and the annual concerts
- A music block on the lower school site (2009)
- A drama studio
- A large vertical climbing wall and horizontal bouldering wall on the upper school site (2011)
- 15 m swimming pool on the lower school site
- A specialist science building with laboratories and classrooms (2023)
- A games hardcourt on the upper school site for basketball, tennis and netball (2023)

== Extracurricular activities ==
Whitchurch has a strong sports department and has produced many athletes who have represented Wales or Great Britain in recent years.

The school was named Sports State School of the Year by 7th Annual Aviva Daily Telegraph "School Sports Matters" National Awards in November 2011 in recognition of its sporting achievements.

The Japanese School in Wales (ウェールズ補習授業校 Wēruzu Hoshū Jugyō Kō), a weekend Japanese educational programme, is held at Whitchurch High School.

== Notable former pupils of Whitchurch High School ==
- Gareth Bale (b. July 1989), footballer for Wales, Real Madrid and Tottenham Hotspur
- Kiran Carlson (b. May 1998), cricketer for Glamorgan
- Elinor Crawley (b. Nov 1991), actress
- Matt Elias (b. April 1979), 400 m and 400 m hurdles runner who represented Wales and Great Britain
- Lloyd Jones (b. August 1988), ice dancer who represented France at the 2014 Winter Olympics
- Elliot Kear (b. November 1988), rugby league player and Wales international
- Owen Lane (b. 20 December 1997), rugby player for Cardiff Blues
- Tom Maynard (b. March 1989, d. June 2012), cricketer for Glamorgan and Surrey
- Stephen Morris (b. September 1988), athlete who represented Great Britain at the 2012 and 2016 Paralympic Games
- Ben Slade (b. April 1976), television presenter and educator
- Geraint Thomas (b. May 1986), cyclist, gold medallist at the 2008 and 2012 Olympic Games and winner of the 2018 Tour de France.
- Sarah Thomas (b. November 1992), badminton player who represented Wales at the 2010 Commonwealth Games
- Sam Warburton (b. October 1988), rugby union player and captain of Wales and the British and Irish Lions

=== Whitchurch Grammar School ===
- Andrew Davies (b. September 1936), TV scriptwriter
- Elizabeth Horrocks (b. May 1946), author and winner of BBC Mastermind in 1974
- Howard Jones (b. February 1955), musician
- Maggie Jones, Baroness Jones of Whitchurch (b. May 1955), politician and life peer
- Prof Rhys Jones (b. February 1941, d. September 2001), archaeologist
- Warrant Officer Lyndsay Morgan, Chief of the Air Staff's Warrant Officer (2006–2009)
- Rhodri Morgan (September 1939 – May 2017), First Minister for Wales (2001–09); Labour MP for Cardiff West (1987–2001)
- Dale Owen (2 August 1924 – 12 November 1997), architect
- Judge Sir Malcolm Pill (b. March 1938), jurist
- Prof Dylan Wiliam, emeritus professor at the Institute of Education, University of London
