= Clive Martland =

British Royal Air Force officer (born 1968)

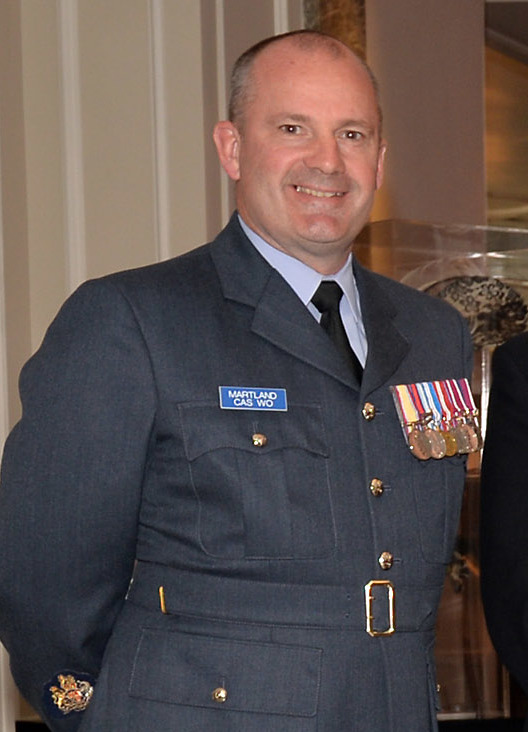
- Martland in 2015
- Born: 6 March 1968 (age 58)
- Military career
- Allegiance: United Kingdom
- Branch: Royal Air Force
- Service years: 1986–present
- Rank: Wing Commander
- Conflicts: Gulf War; War in Afghanistan
- Awards: Member of the Order of the British Empire

Squadron Leader Clive Alan Martland, MBE (born 26 August 1968) is a Royal Air Force officer who was formerly the most senior Warrant officer of the RAF. Having served for most of his career as a Physical Training Instructor, he was the Chief of the Air Staff's Warrant Officer from 2014 until 2016. He was, therefore, the most senior member of the other ranks of the RAF.

== Early life ==
Martland was born in 1968. He was educated at Fulwood High School and W. R. Tuson College in Preston, Lancashire. After leaving school, he wanted to either become a Physical Education teacher at a school or a Physical Training Instructor in the military.

== Military career ==
Martland joined the Royal Air Force in January 1986, aged 17. He completed basic training, and then undertook trade training at RAF Cosford to become a Physical Training Instructor. His first posting was to RAF Church Fenton in North Yorkshire. This was followed by postings to RAF Cosford in Shropshire and RAF Hereford in Herefordshire, and abroad to RAF Akrotiri in Cyprus.

He completed sub-specialization training as an Exercise Rehabilitation Instructor (ERI) in August 1995. He was then posted to the Defence Medicine Rehabilitation Centre (DMRC) at RAF Headley Court, Surrey; this would be first of three tours of duty at the DMRC. Having been promoted to sergeant in May 1997, he was posted to the Military Corrective Training Centre (MCTC) in Colchester. Next, he was posted to RAF Shawbury, where he served as SNCO of the Physical Education Flight. During this latter posting, he also completed an operational tour to the Falkland Islands.

He was promoted to flight sergeant in 2005. He then returned to Headley Court where he worked as a teacher of exercise therapy and kinesiology. In June 2007, he moved to RAF Brize Norton to take command of the base gymnasium. During the posting, he completed a Bachelor of Science Honours degree in sports rehabilitation.

Martland was promoted to warrant officer in June 2010. He then returned for a third time to Headley Court, this time as a Trade Specialist advisor to the centre's Exercise Rehabilitation Instructors. During this posting, he was deployed to Afghanistan as part of Operation Herrick. In October 2012, he returned to RAF Brize Norton as the station warrant officer (SWO).

On 20 October 2014, he took up the appointment of Chief of the Air Staff's Warrant Officer (CASWO). The holder of this appointment is the most senior warrant officer, and therefore other ranks, of the Royal Air Force; and accordingly, the most senior airman in the country. He stepped down as CASWO in 2016 and was succeeded by Jon Crossley.

=== Commissioned officer ===
On 13 October 2016, Martland was granted a commission and made a flight lieutenant. He was promoted to squadron leader on 14 May 2018, and to wing commander on 16 September 2024.

== Honours ==
During his posting to RAF Brize Norton between 2007 and 2010, Martland was awarded the Meritorious Service Medal. This is a medal awarded to non-commissioned officers who have served a minimum of twenty years in the British Armed Forces and have been judged to have given "good, faithful, valuable and meritorious service". In the 2016 New Years Honours, he was appointed a Member of the Order of the British Empire (MBE).

In addition, Martland is a recipient of the Queen Elizabeth II Golden Jubilee Medal, the Queen Elizabeth II Diamond Jubilee Medal, and the Long Service and Good Conduct Medal – the latter awarded for 15 years service.

== Personal life ==
As of 2016, Martland has two sons and one daughter. As well as enjoying quality time with his family, he also enjoys all sport – particularly football, and admits to "playing golf badly".

Military offices
Preceded by Graeme Spark	Chief of the Air Staff's Warrant Officer; 2014 – 2016	Succeeded by Jon Crossley
