= Murugesvaran Subramaniam =

11th Warrant Officer of the Royal Air Force

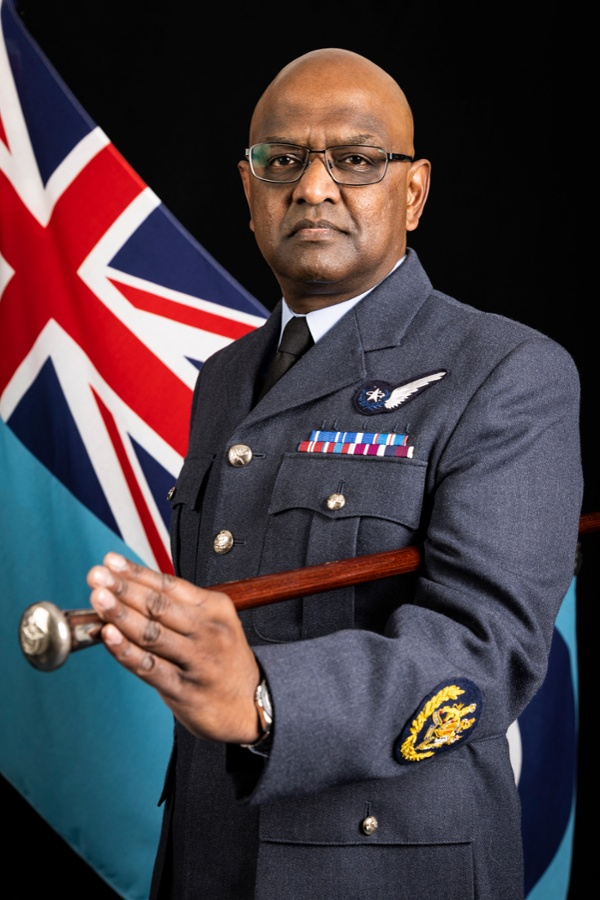
- Official portrait, 2023
- Military career
- Allegiance: United Kingdom
- Branch: British Army; Royal Air Force
- Service years: 1998–present
- Rank: Warrant Officer
- Nickname: Subby
- Commands: Warrant Officer of the Royal Air Force (2023—)

Warrant Officer Murugesvaran Subramaniam is a senior Royal Air Force non-commissioned officer, who currently serves as the Warrant Officer of the Royal Air Force.

== Early life ==
Subramaniam was educated in Malaysia until the age of 19 when he moved to the UK. He earned a Bachelor of Laws degree and a Diploma of Higher Education in Finance and Legal Studies from Sheffield Hallam University.

== Military career ==
He joined the British Army and served in the Royal Engineers with 106 Field Squadron/12 Force (Air) Support Group, 36 Engineering Regiment. He then joined the Royal Air Force in 1998 and was posted to air defence duties at RAF Neatishead and subsequently RAF Buchan. In 2004 he was posted to the Maritime Component Command Northwood as the Recognised Maritime Intelligence Operator, working in an Intelligence Production Cell (IPC) in support of NATO maritime operations and anti-submarine warfare.

In 2007, he was reassigned to RAF High Wycombe, working on pan-government reliance operations, and also gained a number of qualifications while there. In 2010, he was selected for an assignment to Buckley Air Force Base with the United States Air Force as part of the Space-Based Infrared System (SBIRS) programme, where he qualified as a Systems Crew Chief, and later a Flight Chief.
In 2014, he returned to the UK and was posted to RAF Fylingdales as a Crew Chief, supervising the operation of the Ballistic Missile Early Warning System (BMEWS). He would later take up the role of Deputy Plans and Mission Support Flight, which saw him posted back to RAF High Wycombe and service in principally administration jobs. In 2019, he was promoted to Warrant Officer (WO) and appointed as the commanding WO of the RAF's Ballistic Missile Defence (BMD) and the Link 16 system.

In 2021, he was appointed as the inaugural Command Warrant Officer to the United Kingdom Space Command (UKSC), and the following year was selected as the first RAF WO to attend the Command Senior Enlisted Staff Course at Baltic Defence College in Estonia, where Subramaniam graduated with the Commandant's Award. He was appointed as the Warrant Officer of the Royal Air Force in April 2023.

== Personal life ==
Subramaniam is married to a civil servant who is also employed in the RAF, and they have one daughter. He enjoys many sports, such as rugby, hockey and cricket. Subramaniam is Hindu.

== Awards and decorations ==
Medals
NATO Former Republic of Yugoslavia Medal
NATO Kosovo Medal
Queen Elizabeth II Golden Jubilee Medal
Queen Elizabeth II Diamond Jubilee Medal
Queen Elizabeth II Platinum Jubilee Medal
King Charles III Coronation Medal
Meritorious Service Medal (Royal Air Force)
Royal Air Force Long Service and Good Conduct Medal

Military offices
Preceded by Jake Alpert	Warrant Officer of the Royal Air Force; 2023–present	Incumbent
