= Jon Crossley =

British air force officer

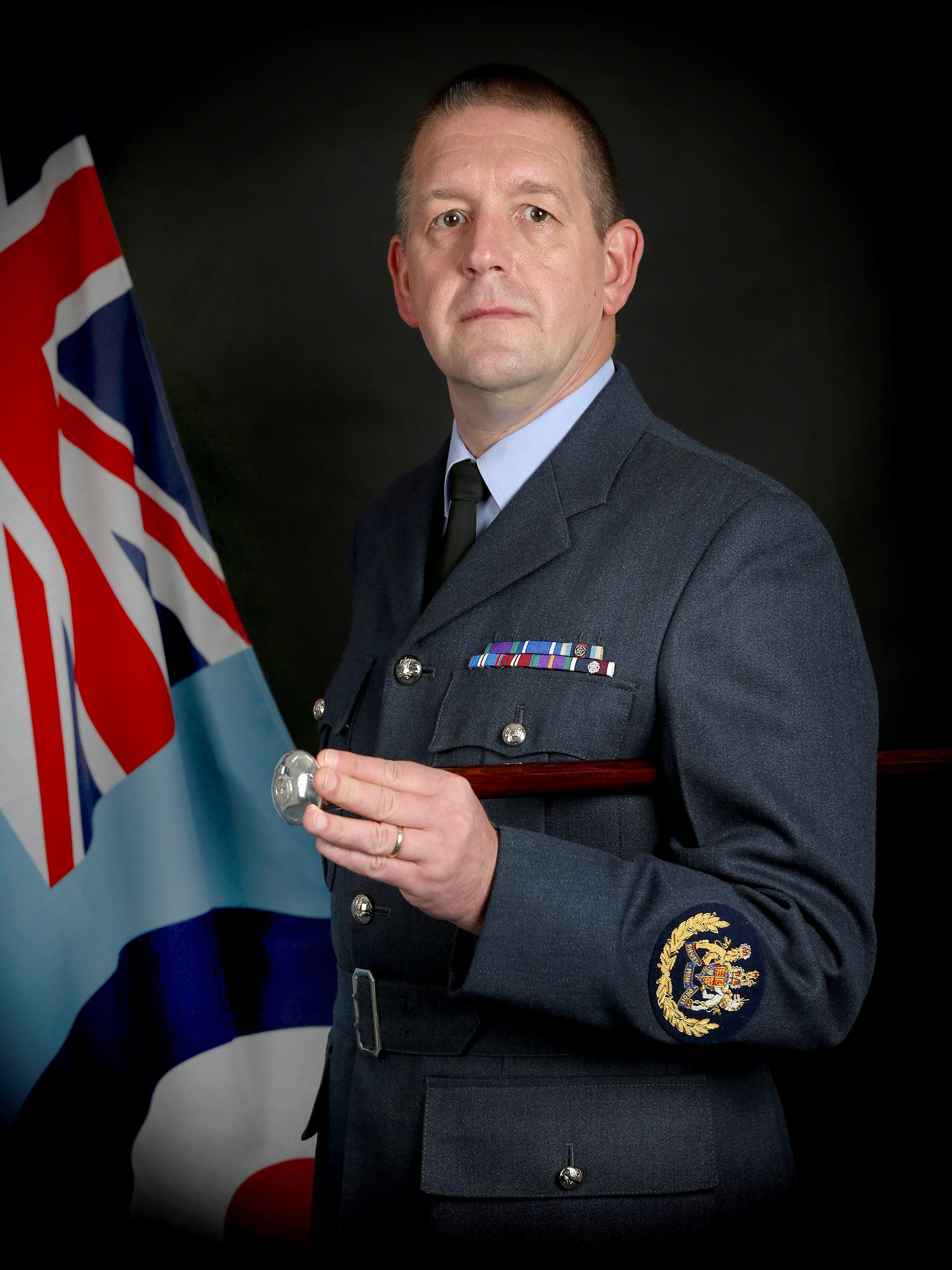
- Born: Lancashire, England
- Military career
- Allegiance: United Kingdom
- Branch: Royal Air Force
- Service years: 1985–present
- Rank: Warrant Officer
- Conflicts: The Troubles; Bosnian War; War in Afghanistan

Jon Crossley is a senior warrant officer in the Royal Air Force. He served as Chief of the Air Staff's Warrant Officer from 2016 to 2019.

== Military career ==
Crossley joined the Royal Air Force (RAF) in November 1985. He trained as a plotter air photographer at RAF Wyton. From June 2014 to October 2016, he served as Station Warrant Officer of Royal Air Force College Cranwell.

Military offices
| Preceded by Clive Martland | Chief of the Air Staff's Warrant Officer; 2016–2019 | Succeeded by Jake Alpert |
