= Gary Wilcox =

Airman and military aircraft engineering technician

- Military career
- Allegiance: United Kingdom
- Branch: Royal Air Force
- Service years: 1974–2012
- Rank: Warrant Officer
- Commands: Chief of the Air Staff's Warrant Officer (2009–2012)
- Conflicts: Op TELIC (Iraq); Op HERRICK (Afghanistan)
- Awards: MBE

Warrant Officer Gary Wilcox MBE is a retired Royal Air Force (RAF) airman and military aircraft engineering technician. He was the Chief of the Air Staff's Warrant Officer (CASWO) to Air Chief Marshal Sir Stephen Dalton, taking post on 27 July 2009; 17 years ago, until his retirement in February 2012; 14 years ago; making him the most senior other rank (OR) member of the RAF during that time.

== Military career ==
Aircraftman (AC) Wilcox entered Royal Air Force military trade training at RAF Halton as an apprentice aircraft engineering mechanic in October 1974, as part of entry number 124. During his time in training, he represented the RAF in football and athletics. Upon completion of trade training, his first posting (a term used by the British Armed Forces when one is officially sent to a new unit location) was to RAF Scampton in Lincolnshire, to work on Avro Vulcan bombers, carrying out second-line maintenance. In 1978, after further trade training (Fitters course), he attained a Higher National Certificate (HNC) in Mechanical Engineering, and was promoted to corporal (Cpl).

Wilcox was promoted to sergeant (Sgt) in 1981, and posted to No. 33 Squadron to work on Westland Pumas at RAF Odiham. From there he was detached to Belize, Northern Ireland, Portugal, Turkey, and Bardufoss in Norway. While posted to Norway, he was injured in a crash while flying in a Gazelle during white out conditions, and received a commendation from the air officer commanding in chief (AOCinC) for his rescue efforts in spite of his own injuries. In 1983, maintaining his link with the Puma helicopter, he was posted to No. 230 Squadron at RAF Gütersloh in West Germany. Whilst stationed at Gütersloh, Wilcox became the lead engineer during many detachments at various locations in Europe.

In 1986, Wilcox was promoted to Chief Technician (Chf Tech), and posted to 1 Air Maintenance Squadron at RAF Abingdon where he worked on Jaguars carrying out major overhauls, together with airframe research in partnership with aerospace industries. A further detachment included a renewed acquaintance with Pumas, this time with 1563 Flight at Belize. 1990 introduced Wilcox to a new type of airframe; he was posted to 19 Squadron at RAF Wildenrath in West Germany to work on the Phantoms as Rectification Controller. Whilst at Wildenrath, he was sent on detachments to Florennes in Belgium and RAF Decimomannu in Sardinia. During the drawdown of British military in Germany following the cessation of the Cold War, and the subsequent closure of RAF bases in Germany, Wilcox moved from Wildenrath to first RAF Gutersloh and then RAF Laarbruch, working as the as Eng Ops Controller.

Wilcox returned to the United Kingdom in 1993, specifically to Aircraft Servicing Flight (ASF) as Team Chief at RAF Odiham, where he was reunited with the Puma. His extensive experience and knowledge on the Puma saw Wilcox selected to work with the United Nations in Bosnia during the conflict. In 1996, Wilcox was promoted to Flight Sergeant (Flt Sgt), and shortly thereafter sent to the Helicopter Maintenance Flight (HMF) at RAF St Mawgan in Cornwall to work on Sea Kings, though this was to be a brief interlude, as Wilcox returned to Laarbruch to become the Quality Audit Co-ordinator (QAC); this role was a multi-platform task, encompassing a joint environment consisting of Harrier, Chinook, and Puma; specifically within logistics. When Laarbruch finally closed in 1999, Wilcox was posted to RAF Cottesmore in Rutland, continuing his role as QAC, at the time when Cottesmore was transitioning from the long-established Tri-National Tornado Training Establishment (TTTE) to becoming the main operating base (MOB) for all RAF Harriers. Wilcox was also invited to assist with the Command External Quality Audits.

In 2001, Wilcox was promoted to Warrant Officer (WO), though staying at Cottesmore, taking up post of Engineering Standards; a role which oversees self supervision, along with additional responsibilities to provide Joint Force Harrier (JFH) management direction of LITS implementation. In 2004, Wilcox served out of area (OOA) with the Joint Helicopter Force during Op TELIC at Basra in Iraq, providing engineering support along with Quality Assurance and Health & Safety for the tri-service rotary wing operations. This latter detachment rekindled his wish to serve as a warrant officer on a front-line operational aircraft squadron. This was achieved in 2005, Wilcox was appointed squadron warrant officer to IV (AC) Squadron, who were operating the Harrier at RAF Cottesmore. His time at IV Sqn was intensive, and included the migration of the RAF Harrier into Royal Navy service together with its requisite multi-skilling, with a detachment to HMS Illustrious, along with further detachments to the US and Cyprus. Whilst at IV Sqn, Wilcox was sent to Afghanistan for five operational tours as part of Op HERRICK.

== Personal life ==
At the time of his appointment to CASWO, Wilcox had been married for three decades to his wife Sheena, who is a British military Career Guidance Resettlement Consultant. The couple have a daughter called Freya, who was then commencing her A level studies. He lives with his family in Peterborough, Cambridgeshire.

Military offices
Preceded by Lyndsay Morgan	Chief of the Air Staff's Warrant Officer; July 2009 – February 2012	Succeeded by Graeme Spark
