= Jake Alpert =

British Royal Air Force officer (born 1968)

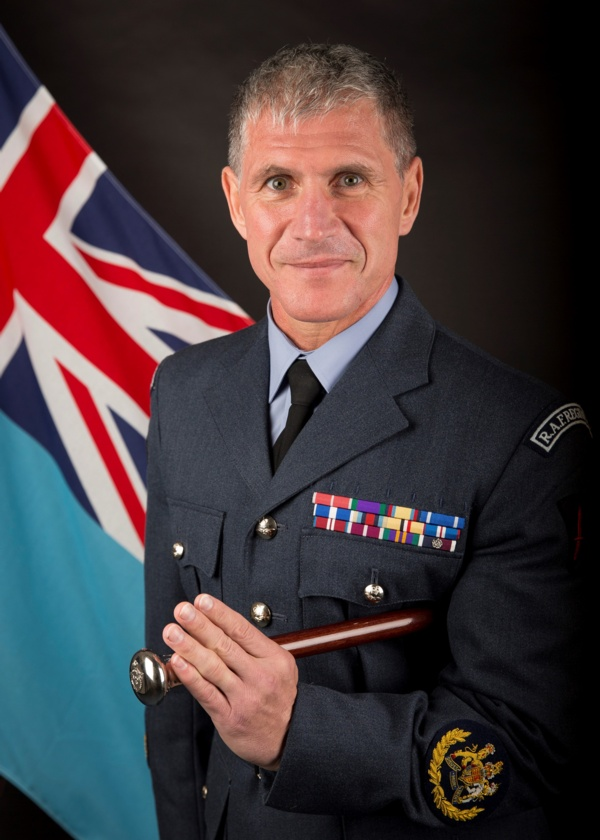
- Military career
- Allegiance: United Kingdom
- Branch: Royal Air Force
- Service years: 1988–2025
- Rank: Warrant Officer
- Commands: Warrant Officer of the Royal Air Force
- Conflicts: The Troubles; Gulf War; Iraq War; War in Afghanistan
- Awards: Member of the Order of the British Empire

Warrant Officer Jake Alpert, MBE is a retired senior warrant officer in the Royal Air Force, who served as Warrant Officer of the Royal Air Force from 2019 to 2023. Therefore, he was the most senior non-commissioned officer in the RAF.

== Military career ==
Alpert joined the Royal Air Force (RAF) in 1988. He completed his first tour while with No. 15 Squadron RAF Regiment at RAF Hullavington. Upon completion of the Pre-Parachute Selection Course and the Basic Parachute course, he went on his first operational tour to Northern Ireland. He then moved to No. II Squadron RAF Regiment serving with them for 11 years at multiple bases and took on further operational tours.

In 2001, he was posted to the RAF Force Protection (FP) Centre on promotion to sergeant. He then completed the All Arms Commando Course and was subsequently awarded the Commandants' Certificate in 2004. He was then assigned to 45 Commando Royal Marines as the troop sergeant. He completed two tours with the Royal Marines during that time.

In 2008, Alpert was promoted to flight sergeant and rejoined No. II Squadron. He was subsequently deployed back to Afghanistan on Operation Herrick IX as an Intelligence Surveillance Recognition Manager. He was promoted to warrant officer in 2010 and served as the Station Warrant Officer (SWO) at RAF Shawbury and served as OC FP Training Flight. In 2011, he returned to II Squadron as the WO in charge of the RAF security unit deployed on Camp Bastion.

In 2013, he once again returned to Afghanistan as garrison sergeant major of Kandahar Air Field. In 2015, Alpert was selected for the RAF's Executive Warrant Officer employment program, while serving as the station warrant officer at RAF Halton. He received the Meritorious Service Medal for his services.

In 2017, Alpert was appointed Command Senior Enlisted Leader of Allied Air Command and completed several command courses. In October 2019, he was appointed to the role of Warrant Officer of the Royal Air Force; when first appointed, the position was known as the Chief of the Air Staff's Warrant Officer. He left the office of WORAF in April 2023.

== Honours and decorations ==
In 2016, during his time at RAF Halton Alpert was awarded the Meritorious Service Medal. The medal is awarded for "meritorious service by those military members who are of irreproachable character with at least 20 years of service and already hold the Long Service and Good Conduct Medal of their service". In 2019, he was appointed a Member of the Order of the British Empire.

Military offices
Preceded by Jon Crossley	Chief of the Air Staff's Warrant Officer; 2019 - 2021	Succeeded by Post Renamed
Preceded by Post Renamed	Warrant Officer of the Royal Air Force; 2021 - 2023	Succeeded by Murugesvaran Subramaniam
