= Lyndsay Morgan =

Welsh Senior RAF Warrant Officer

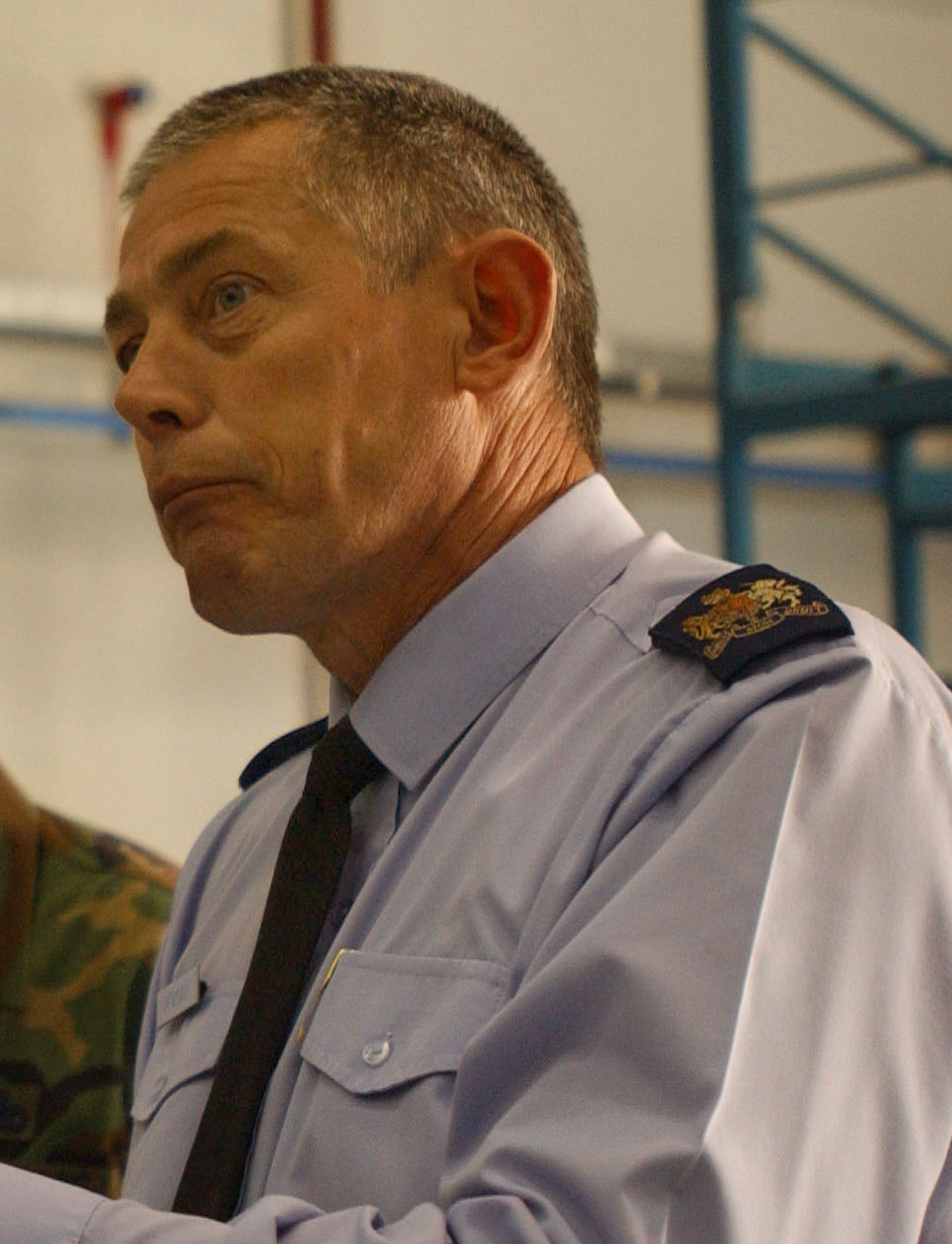
- Morgan visiting RAF Mildenhall in 2007
- Born: Cardiff, Wales
- Military career
- Allegiance: United Kingdom
- Branch: Royal Air Force
- Service years: 1972–2009
- Rank: Warrant Officer
- Service number: K8102295
- Commands: Chief of the Air Staff's Warrant Officer
- Awards: Member of the Order of the British Empire

Warrant Officer Lyndsay Hugh Morgan, MBE is a retired member of the Royal Air Force. He was the Chief of the Air Staff's Warrant Officer, the senior other rank in the Royal Air Force, from 2006 to 2009.

== Early life ==
Morgan was born in Cardiff, Wales, and attended Whitchurch Grammar School.

== Military career ==
Morgan joined the Royal Air Force after leaving school in 1972 at the age of 17. He became an aircraft technician specialising in engineering. He has been posted to RAF Brawdy.

Morgan was made a Member of the Order of the British Empire in the 2010 Birthday Honours.

Military offices
Preceded by Robert Loughlin	Chief of the Air Staff's Warrant Officer; 2006–2009	Succeeded by Gary Wilcox
