= Warrant Officer of the Royal Air Force =

Most senior enlisted rank appointment of the Royal Air Force

- WORAF insignia

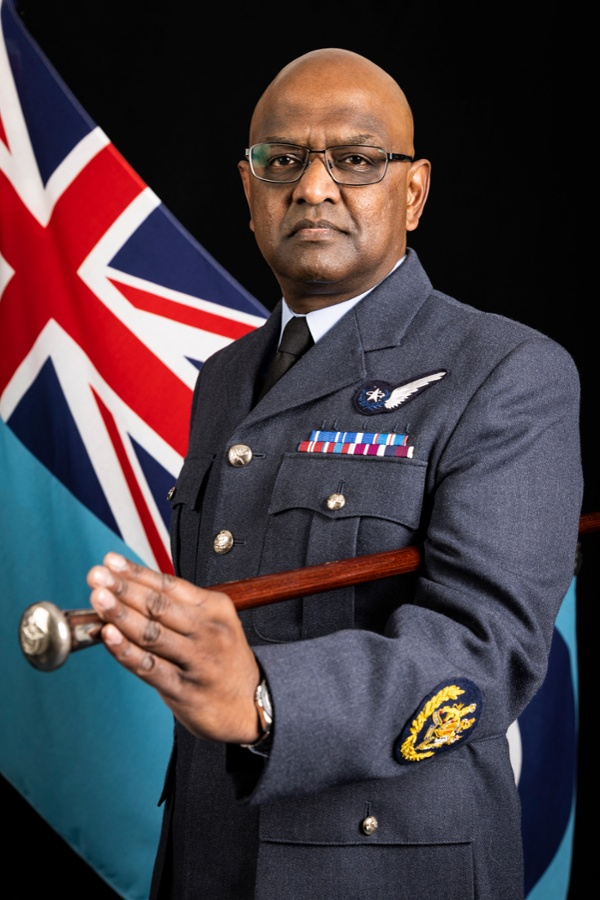
- Incumbent; Murugesvaran 'Subby' Subramaniam since April 2023
- Ministry of Defence
- Style: Warrant Officer
- Abbreviation: WORAF
- Reports to: Chief of the Air Staff
- Appointer: Air Force Board
- Term length: Not fixed, typically 2–3 years
- Formation: May 1996; 30 years ago
- First holder: WO Greg Dutton
- Website: Official website

The Warrant Officer of the Royal Air Force (WORAF), previously known as the Chief of the Air Staff's Warrant Officer (CASWO), is the senior Royal Air Force (RAF) appointment for a warrant officer (WO), and therefore the most senior non-commissioned appointment in the RAF. The person holding this military appointment advises the Chief of the Air Staff (CAS) on matters concerning airmen and airwomen of the RAF. The post was created in May 1996, as the Chief of the Air Staff's Warrant Officer. The post was re-titled Warrant Officer of the Royal Air Force (WORAF) on 1 July 2021, and whilst continuing to report directly to the Chief of the Air Staff, the scope of the WORAF was widened to 'work for the entirety of the RAF'. The current WORAF is WO Murugesvaran 'Subby' Subramaniam, who was appointed in April 2023. As of 2023 including the incumbent, there has been a total of eleven personnel in this appointment.

The Royal Navy equivalent is the Warrant Officer to the Royal Navy (WORN, previously Warrant Officer of the Naval Service, WONS), and in the Royal Marines the Corps Regimental Sergeant Major. The British Army's recent equivalent is the Army Sergeant Major (previously known as Sergeant Major of the Army).

== List of holders ==
No.	Portrait	Name (born–died)	Term of office			Chief of the Air Staff	Ref.
No.	Portrait	Name (born–died)	Took office	Left office	Time in office	Chief of the Air Staff	Ref.
Chief of the Air Staff's Warrant Officer (CASWO)
1		Greg Dutton; MBE, BEM	May 1996	January 1998	1 year, 8 months	Sir Michael Graydon; Sir Richard Johns	
2		Jim Andrews; MBE, BEM	January 1998	January 2000	2 years	Sir Richard Johns	
3		René Michael Stuart; MBE	January 2000	May 2003	3 years, 4 months	Sir Richard Johns; Sir Peter Squire	
4		Robert 'Bob' Loughlin; MBE	May 2003	November 2006	3 years, 6 months	Sir Jock Stirrup; Sir Glenn Torpy	
5		Lyndsay Morgan; MBE	November 2006	July 2009	2 years, 8 months	Sir Glenn Torpy	
6		Gary Wilcox; MBE	July 2009	February 2012	2 years, 7 months	Sir Stephen Dalton	
7		Graeme Spark; MBE	February 2012	October 2014	2 years, 8 months	Sir Stephen Dalton; Sir Andrew Pulford	
8		Clive Martland; MBE (born 1968)	October 2014	October 2016	2 years	Sir Andrew Pulford; Sir Stephen Hillier	
9		Jon Crossley	October 2016	October 2019	3 years	Sir Stephen Hillier; Sir Michael Wigston	
10		Jake Alpert; MBE	October 2019	July 2021	1 year, 9 months	Sir Michael Wigston	
Warrant Officer of the Royal Air Force (WORAF)
10		Jake Alpert; MBE	July 2021	April 2023	1 year, 9 months	Sir Michael Wigston	
11		Murugesvaran 'Subby' Subramaniam	April 2023	Incumbent	3 years, 5 months	Sir Michael Wigston; Sir Richard Knighton Sir Harv Smyth	

== See also ==
- RAF other ranks
- Warrant Officer of the Air Force – equivalent in the Royal Australian Air Force (RAAF)
- Chief Master Sergeant of the Air Force – equivalent in the United States Air Force (USAF)
- Sergeant Major of the Air Force – equivalent in the South African Air Force (SAAF)
- Senior Enlisted Advisor to the Chiefs of Staff Committee - senior OR to Chiefs of Staff Committee
