= Graeme Spark =

- Military career
- Allegiance: United Kingdom
- Branch: Royal Air Force
- Service years: 1985–2014
- Rank: Warrant Officer
- Unit: RAF Police
- Commands: Chief of the Air Staff's Warrant Officer
- Conflicts: Operation Banner; Iraq War; War in Afghanistan
- Awards: Member of the Order of the British Empire

Warrant Officer Graeme William Spark, MBE is a retired Royal Air Force (RAF) warrant officer. From 2012 to 2014, he was the Chief of the Air Staff's Warrant Officer and therefore the most senior of the other ranks in the RAF.

== RAF career ==
Spark joined the Royal Air Force (RAF) in 1985, undergoing his airman and trade training as a RAF Police NCO at RAF Swinderby and RAF Newton respectively.

In January 2008 Spark volunteered for employment as the Wing Warrant Officer of No. 3 (Tactical) Police Wing. He was actively engaged in many areas of RAF Police operations in support of Operation Telic in Iraq and Operation Herrick in Afghanistan.

Following selection for Station Warrant Officer duties, Spark was posted to RAF Leeming as the Station Warrant Officer in June 2010. He was chosen as the Chief of the Air Staff's Warrant Officer in September 2011, taking up appointment in February 2012, and served in the role until October 2014.

Warrant Officer Graham Spark was the winner of the Environmental Champion Individual Award. As of 2014 He set off the development of a wildlife haven during the construction of the F35 Lightning aircraft RAF Marham base. He created trekking trails and a woodland for the local wildlife to be re-homed.

Military offices
Preceded by Gary Wilcox	Chief of the Air Staff's Warrant Officer; 2012–2014	Succeeded by Clive Martland
