= Station warrant officer =

The station warrant officer (SWO, often pronounced as a word) is the senior warrant officer on a British Royal Air Force station. The SWO is responsible for discipline and is therefore comparable to the regimental sergeant major in a British Army unit. They are the station commander's link to the other ranks and their eyes and ears on the ground for all issues that may affect the smooth running of the station.

Once a member of the Royal Air Force has reached the rank of warrant officer or master aircrew, they are eligible to apply to be a SWO.
