= Glenn Haughton =

Former British Army soldier

Major Glenn Haughton OBE
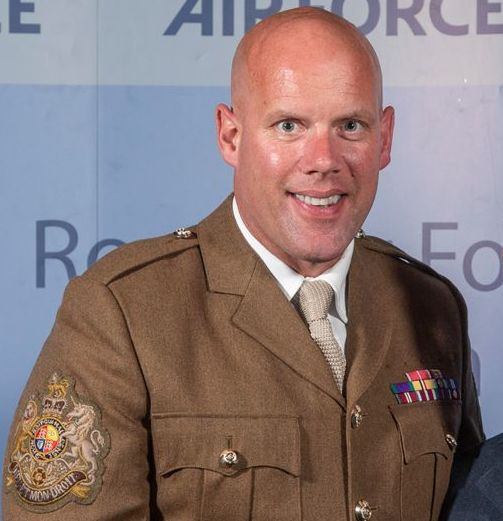
- Haughton in September 2019
- Born: May 1972 (age 54)
- Military career
- Allegiance: United Kingdom
- Branch: British Army
- Service years: 1988–2021
- Rank: Major
- Unit: Grenadier Guards
- Commands: Senior Enlisted Advisor to the Chiefs of Staff Committee (2018–2021); Army Sergeant Major (2015–2018)
- Conflicts: Gulf War; War in Afghanistan; Iraq War
- Awards: Officer of the Order of the British Empire

Major Glenn John Haughton OBE (born May 1972) is a retired British Army officer. In November 2018, he served as the Senior Enlisted Advisor to the Chiefs of Staff Committee until December 2021. He was previously the Army Sergeant Major, the most senior warrant officer and member of the other ranks in the British Army, from 2015 to 2018. He has also served as Regimental Sergeant Major of the 1st Battalion, Grenadier Guards and Academy Sergeant Major at the Royal Military Academy Sandhurst.

== Early life and education ==
Haughton left school after taking his GCSEs at the age of 16 and joined the armed forces in 1988.

While serving in the army, Haughton completed an Extended Diploma in strategic management; this is a qualification equivalent to two A-Levels. Haughton holds a first class master's degree in business administration.

== Military career ==
=== Early career ===
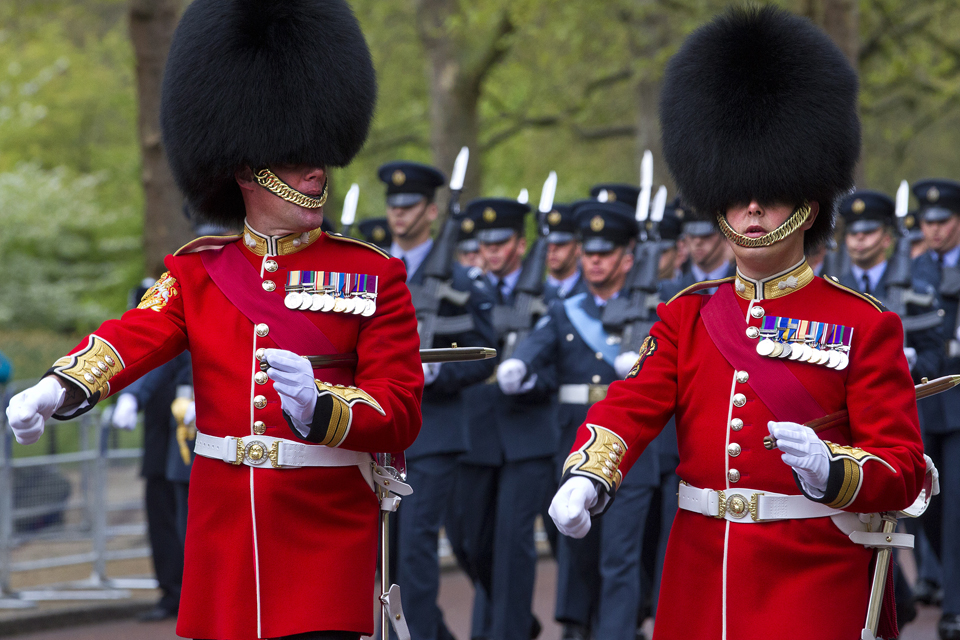
Regimental Sergeant Major Haughton (left) during the State Opening of Parliament, 2013

In 1988, Haughton joined the British Army as a guardsman in the Grenadier Guards. During his career he has served a number of overseas posting and was involved in a number of conflicts including the Gulf War, the War in Afghanistan, and the Iraq War. He was appointed Regimental Sergeant Major of the 1st Battalion Grenadier Guards in 2011. This meant he became the most senior soldier of the regiment.

In 2010, Haughton was selected for a Late Entry Commission (i.e. he was a senior serving soldier selected to become a commissioned officer). However, he was chosen to continue working as one of the army's most senior warrant officers rather than immediately take up the role of a staff officer. On 9 December 2013, he was commissioned into the British Army with the rank of captain but continued serving in the rank of warrant officer class 1. He was appointed academy sergeant major of the Royal Military Academy Sandhurst in January 2014.

=== Senior appointments ===
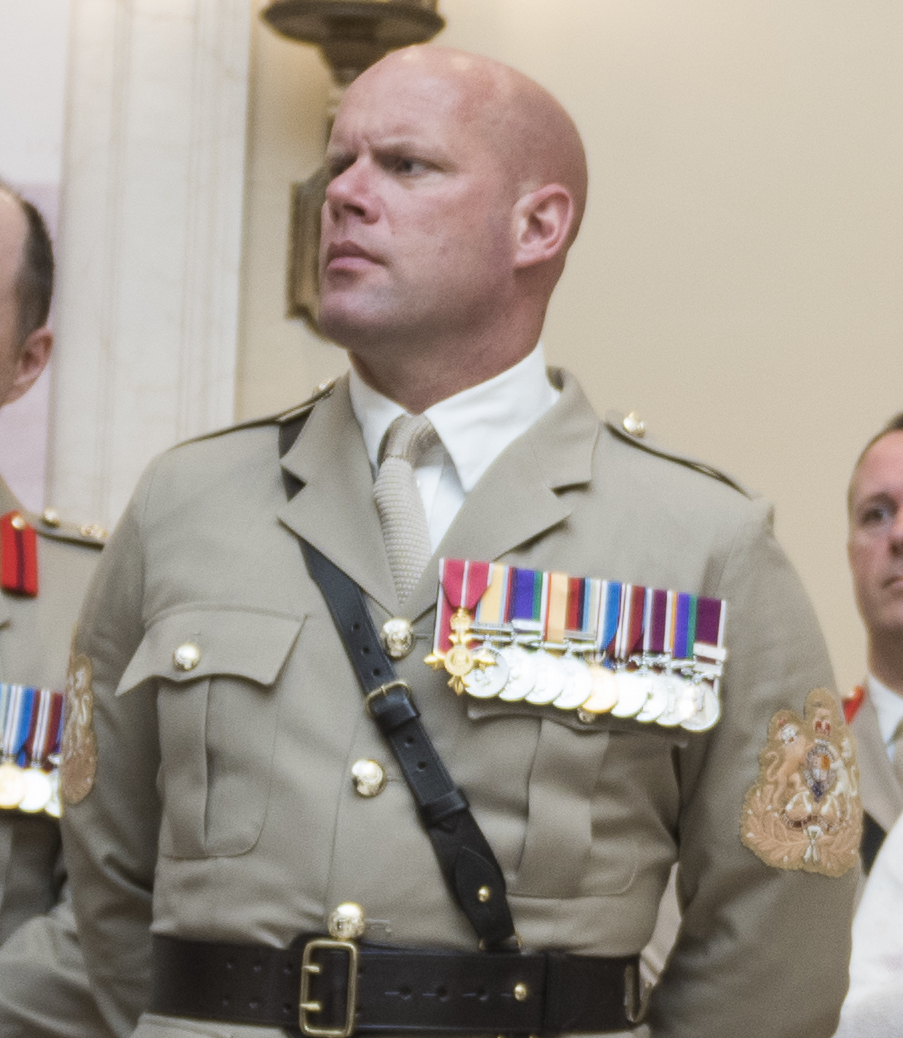
Army Sergeant Major Haughton in 2018

In January 2014, Haughton was appointed academy sergeant major, one of the most senior warrant officer appointments in the British Army.

In March 2015, he was appointed Army Sergeant Major, making him the most senior warrant officer/other ranks soldier in the British Army. As the Army Sergeant Major, he was the only soldier (and the first) to be a member of the Army Board.

On 1 November 2018, Haughton was appointed as the first Senior Enlisted Advisor to the Chiefs of Staff Committee. Although he continued to serve as a warrant officer class 1 in this position, he was promoted to major on 31 July 2019.

He left service in 2021 after being investigated for a breach of Values and Standards after allegedly becoming inappropriately involved with the wife of a junior non-commissioned officer who had approached him in his role as mental health champion.

== Personal life ==
Haughton is married and has two children. He left Twitter after claiming 'poor mental health as a result of trolling' after being publicly challenged over his record.

== Honours and decorations ==
In January 2014, Haughton was awarded the Meritorious Service Medal for distinguished service. In the 2018 New Year Honours, he was appointed an Officer of the Order of the British Empire (OBE).

Military offices
New title	Army Sergeant Major; 2015–2018	Succeeded by Gavin Paton
New title	Senior Enlisted Advisor to the Chiefs of Staff Committee; 2018–2021	Succeeded by Richard Angove
