= Academy sergeant major =

Senior non-commissioned officer instructor at a military academy

The academy sergeant major is the senior non-commissioned officer instructor at a military academy.

== British Army ==
Academy Sergeant Major
- Insignia of the Academy Sergeant Major
- Royal Military Academy Sandhurst
- Style: Academy Sergeant Major (Note: In the plural, modern practice by the British Ministry of Defence uses the term 'sergeant majors' rather than 'sergeants major'.)
- Abbreviation: AcSM
- Precursor: Regimental Sergeant Major, RMAS
- Formation: December 1960
- First holder: JC Lord

At the British Army's Royal Military Academy Sandhurst, the academy sergeant major (AcSM) (Note: ASM in the British Army stands for artificer sergeant major, an appointment in the Royal Electrical and Mechanical Engineers.) holds the rank of warrant officer class 1. Almost always held by a guardsman, it is one of the most senior warrant officer appointments in the British Army.

=== List of academy sergeant majors ===
Portrait	Name	Took office	Left office	Regiment	Ref.
John Clifford Lord	Warrant Officer Class One; John Clifford Lord; MVO MBE	December 1960	August 1963	Grenadier Guards	
CH Phillips	Warrant Officer Class One; CH Phillips; MBE	August 1963	December 1970	Welsh Guards	
RP Huggins	Warrant Officer Class One; RP Huggins; MBE	December 1970	February 1980	Grenadier Guards	
DP Cleary	Warrant Officer Class One; DP Cleary; MBE	February 1980	September 1987	Irish Guards	
M Nesbitt	Warrant Officer Class One; M Nesbitt	September 1987	August 1993	Grenadier Guards	
DL Cox	Warrant Officer Class One; DL Cox	August 1993	August 1994	Grenadier Guards	
RH McCormack	Warrant Officer Class One; RH McCormack	September 1994	April 1997	Coldstream Guards	
AJ Crawford	Warrant Officer Class One; AJ Crawford; MBE	May 1997	April 2000	Scots Guards	
R Convery	Warrant Officer Class One; R Convery	April 2000	December 2002	Scots Guards	
M Gaunt	Warrant Officer Class One; M Gaunt; OBE	December 2002	August 2005	Grenadier Guards	
Simon Nichols	Warrant Officer Class One; Simon Nichols; MBE	August 2005	August 2007	Irish Guards	
P.J Carr	Warrant Officer Class One; P.J Carr	August 2007	April 2010	Coldstream Guards	
Ross Martin	Warrant Officer Class One; Ross Martin	April 2010	December 2011	Irish Guards	
Vern Stokes	Warrant Officer Class One; Vern Stokes; MVO MSM	December 2011	2014	Coldstream Guards	
Glenn Haughton	Warrant Officer Class One; Glenn Haughton (born 1972); MSM	January 2014	2015	Grenadier Guards	
D. Macphee	Warrant Officer Class One; D. Macphee (born 1972)	April 2015	April 2017	Scots Guards	
Carl Taylor	Warrant Officer Class One; Carl Taylor	April 2017	January 2021	Welsh Guards	
Andy Purcell	Warrant Officer Class One; Andy Purcell	April 2017	August 2021	Irish Guards	
Colin Kirkwood	Warrant Officer Class One; Colin Kirkwood	August 2021	April 2023	Scots Guards	
Daniel Cope	Warrant Officer Class One; Daniel Cope	April 2023	April 2025	Welsh Guards	
Dwain Oliver	Warrant Officer Class One; Dwain Oliver	April 2025	Present	Grenadier Guards	

== Australian Defence Force ==
At the Australian Defence Force Academy, the academy sergeant major (ASM) also holds the rank of warrant officer class 1 or equivalent and is drawn on rotation from all three services.

== Sri Lanka Army ==
At the Sri Lanka Military Academy, the academy sergeant major (ASM) is of the rank of warrant officer class I.
