= Army Sergeant Major =

Appointment of the British Army

- Insignia of the Army Sergeant Major

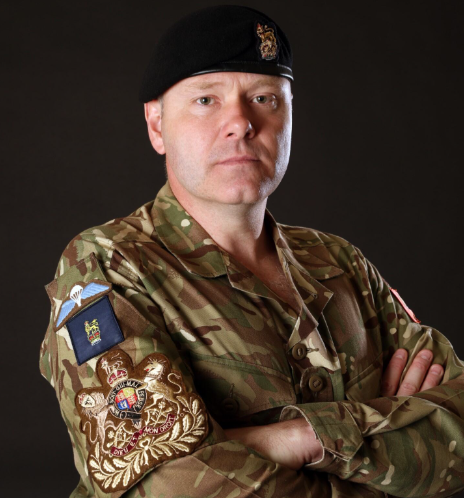
- Incumbent; John Miller since April 2025
- British Army
- Style: Army Sergeant Major
- Member of: Army Board
- Reports to: Chief of the General Staff
- Appointer: Chief of the General Staff
- Formation: February 2015
- First holder: Glenn Haughton
- Website: Official Twitter

The Army Sergeant Major is the most senior member of the other ranks of the British Army.

Although all appointment holders have been former warrant officers who were commissioned as captains before their appointment, the Army Sergeant Major wears the uniform and insignia of a warrant officer class 1. The appointment was created as part of the changes to the British Army's top ranks around February 2015. The ASM sits on the Executive Committee of the Army Board and works with the Secretary of State for Defence, top civil servants and other high-ranking members to shape British Army policy. The first appointment was made in March 2015.

The Army Sergeant Major's rank badge is the royal coat of arms within a wreath.

== Appointees ==
No.	Portrait	Name	Took office	Left office	Time in office	Regiment/Corps	Ref.
1	Glenn Haughton OBE	Glenn Haughton OBE (born 1972)	1 March 2015	31 October 2018	3 years, 244 days	Grenadier Guards	
2	Gavin Paton	Gavin Paton (born 1979)	8 November 2018	3 August 2021	2 years, 268 days	The Rifles	
3	Paul Carney	Paul Carney (born 1979)	3 August 2021	April 2025	3 years, 244 days	Royal Engineers	
4	John Miller	John Miller	April 2025	Incumbent	1 year, 155 days	Royal Corps of Signals	

== See also ==
- Warrant Officer of the Royal Air Force – Royal Air Force equivalent
- Corps Regimental Sergeant Major – Royal Marines equivalent
- Warrant Officer of the Naval Service – Royal Navy equivalent
- Senior Enlisted Advisor to the Chiefs of Staff Committee – senior OR to Chiefs of Staff Committee
