= John Lord =

John Lord may refer to:

- Sir John Owen, 1st Baronet (John Lord, 1776–1861), British politician
- John Chase Lord (1805–1877), American Presbyterian minister and writer
- John Lord (historian) (1810–1894), American historian and lecturer
- John Keast Lord (1818–1872), English veterinary surgeon, naturalist, journalist and author
- John Lord (cricketer) (1844–1911), Australian cricketer
- John King Lord (1848–1926), American classical scholar and historian (See Author:John King Lord on Wikisource.)
- John Lord (footballer, born 1899) (1899–1980), Australian rules footballer with Melbourne and St Kilda
- John Whitaker Lord Jr. (1901–1972), U.S. federal judge
- John Wesley Lord (1902–1989), American Methodist bishop
- John Lord (British Army soldier) (1908–1968), British Army warrant officer
- John Lord (footballer, born 1937) (1937–2021), Australian rules footballer with Melbourne
- John Vernon Lord (born 1939), British author and illustrator
- John Lord (admiral) (born 1948), Royal Australian Navy admiral

== See also ==
- Jon Lord (disambiguation)
- Jack Lord (1920–1998), American actor
