= Conductor (military appointment) =

Commonwealth military appointment

- Army insignia
- Country: United Kingdom
- Service branch: British Army
- Abbreviation: Cdr
- Rank group: Warrant officer
- Rank: Warrant officer class 1
- NATO rank code: OR-9
- Pay grade: Range 5
- Formation: 1879

Conductor (Cdr) is an appointment held by a few selected warrant officers class 1 in the Royal Logistic Corps and is one of the most senior appointments that can be held by a warrant officer in the British Army. Previously conductor was the most senior warrant officer appointment, but it was outranked with the creation of the Army Sergeant Major appointment in 2015 following Army reforms. The appointment was also reintroduced into the Royal Australian Army Ordnance Corps for selected warrant officers class 1 in 2005.

== History ==
The first known mention of conductors is in the 1327 Statute of Westminster, when they are mentioned as the men whose job it was to conduct soldiers to places of assembly. The "Conductor of Ordnance" is mentioned in the records of the siege of Boulogne in 1544 and conductors are mentioned several times in surviving records from the 17th century. In 1776 they are described in Thomas Simes's book The Military Guide for Young Officers as assistants to the Commissary of Stores; and they were equivalent to non-commissioned officers in the Board of Ordnance Field Train Department from its establishment in 1792. The Land Transport Corps and the Military Store Department of the 19th century both included conductors on their strength.

On 11 January 1879, a Royal Warrant established conductors of supplies (in the Army Service Corps) and conductors of stores (in the Ordnance Store Branch) as warrant officers, ranking above all non-commissioned officers. In 1892, conductors of supplies were renamed staff sergeant majors 1st class, but conductors of stores remained in what in 1896 became the Army Ordnance Corps. Staff sergeant majors in the new corps were renamed sub-conductors. In February 1915, with the general introduction of warrant officers throughout the army, conductors and sub-conductors became warrant officers class I. Sub-conductors reverted to the appointment of staff sergeant major in 1967, but the appointment of conductor passed to the new Royal Logistic Corps in 1993.

The appointment lapsed in the Australian Army in the late 1940s, but was reintroduced in July 2005. The first six conductors were appointed in April 2006.

The appointment of conductor was used in the New Zealand Army up to the 1930s. It then lapsed, to be introduced back into the New Zealand Army in 1977, with the proviso that a maximum of five conductors could be appointed at any one time. The appointment of conductor was discontinued with the amalgamation of the Royal New Zealand Army Ordnance Corps into the Royal New Zealand Army Logistic Regiment (RNZALR) on its establishment in 1996. In October 2024, the RNZALR reintroduced the appointment of conductor within the logistics specialist and ammunition technician trades.

Conductors and sub-conductors also existed in the British Indian Army as appointments held by British warrant officers. The Indian Army, however, never adopted the rank of warrant officer class I, and conductor or sub-conductor was, therefore, the only title they used.

== Contemporary ==
The appointment may now be held by WO1s in any RLC trade, including transport, catering, pioneer, ammunition technician, petroleum operator and postal warrant officers, as well as the original suppliers.

Prospective conductors must have held the rank of WO1 for at least one year (reduced from three years in 2006). They may not be currently serving as regimental sergeant majors (that is, they must be staff sergeant majors). Since 2009, no more than eight serving WO1s of the RLC at any one time may hold the appointment of conductor; before then it was no more than 10% of the WO1s of the RLC (excluding RSMs). Since 2001, conductors have received their warrant of appointment on a parchment scroll.

== Insignia ==
From 11 July 1900, conductors were authorised to wear a crown within a laurel wreath on their lower sleeve and sub-conductors a crown, although they did not start actually wearing these until 1901 and 1904 respectively. In 1915, conductors were authorised a crown in a laurel wreath and sub-conductors the royal coat of arms. In 1918, conductors began wearing the royal arms in a laurel wreath, still their badge of rank, and sub-conductors the royal arms alone. Like other WO1s, conductors wear Sam Browne belts.

== Victoria Crosses and George Cross ==
Two conductors of the Bengal Ordnance Department won the Victoria Cross during the Indian Mutiny. John Buckley won it at Delhi on 11 May 1857 and James Miller at Futtepore on 28 October 1857.

A former conductor of the Royal Logistic Corps, Captain Peter Norton, won the George Cross near Baghdad on 24 July 2005.
