= Army Council (1904) =

Former supreme administrative body of the British Army (1904–1964)

- Flag of the Army Council

Agency overview
- Formed: 1904
- Preceding agency: War Office
- Dissolved: 1964
- Superseding agency: Army Board
- Jurisdiction: United Kingdom
- Headquarters: Whitehall, London
- Parent agency: War Office

The Army Council was the supreme administering body of the British Army from its creation in 1904 until it was reconstituted as the Army Board in 1964.

== History ==
The disastrous campaigns of the Crimean War led to the consolidation of all administrative duties in 1855 under the Secretary of State for War, a Cabinet post. That office was not, however, solely responsible for the Army; the Commander-in-Chief (C-in-C) held a virtually equal level of responsibility. This was reduced in theory by the 1870 reforms introduced by Edward Cardwell, which subordinated the C-in-C to the Secretary for War. In practice, however, a huge amount of influence was retained by the exceedingly conservative C-in-C Field Marshal Prince George, 2nd Duke of Cambridge, who held the post between 1856–1895. His resistance to reform caused military efficiency to lag well behind Britain's rivals, a problem which became painfully obvious during the Second Boer War.

The situation was only remedied in 1904 when the post of Commander-in-Chief was abolished and replaced with that of the Chief of the General Staff. An Army Council was created along similar lines to the Board of Admiralty, chaired by the Secretary of State for War, and an Imperial General Staff was established to coordinate Army administration. All branches of the Army were directed to be subordinated to the Army Council, which was designated as the "supreme administering body" of the Army.

In 1964 with the merger of government departments into the Ministry of Defence, the Army Council was reconstituted as the Army Board.

== Principal members of the council ==
Political

- Secretary of State for War, as President of the Army Council
- Parliamentary Under-Secretary of State for War
- Financial Secretary to the War Office (1904-1947)

Military

- Chief of the (Imperial) General Staff
- Adjutant-General to the Forces
- Quartermaster-General to the Forces
- Master-General of the Ordnance (1904-1939, 1960-1964)
- Deputy Chief of the General Staff, (1914–1922, 1938–1940, 1942-1964)
- Vice-Chief of the Imperial General Staff, (1940–1964)

The Permanent Under-Secretary of State for War served as Secretary of the Army Council. A number of other office holders were members of the Army Council for brief periods including the Director General of the Territorial Army and the Director General of Munitions Production.

== See also ==
- Esher Report
