= Corps Regimental Sergeant Major =

Royal Marines

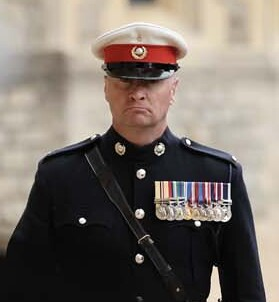
- Incumbent; Tim Jukes since June 2024
- Ministry of Defence
- Style: Mr or Sir
- Type: Senior enlisted advisor
- Abbreviation: Corps RSM
- Reports to: Commandant General Royal Marines
- Nominator: Commandant General
- Appointer: Navy Board
- Term length: Not fixed, typically 1–4 years
- Formation: 1 January 1989
- First holder: David Malcolm Stollery MBE

The Corps Regimental Sergeant Major (Corps RSM) is the most senior warrant officer of the Royal Marines. (Note: In the plural, modern practice by the British Ministry of Defence uses the term 'sergeant majors' rather than 'sergeants major'.) Responsible for maintaining standards and discipline within the Royal Marines, they act as a parental figure to their subordinates and also to junior officers, even though the latter technically outrank the RSM.

== Post creation ==
The post was created in 1989. He is addressed as "Mr" by officers and "Sir" by all other ranks. Routinely known as "the Corps RSM"

"It has been decided to appoint a representative Regimental Sergeant Major, who will be responsible for centralised events involving Warrant Officers and Senior Non Commissioned Officers and upon who the Commandant General can call for advice should he so desire. The Warrant officers so appointed will be called the Corps Regimental Sergeant Major (Corps RSM)"

Royal Marine Routine Orders, Monday 20th February 1989. (signed by Maj. Gen. H. Y. La R. Beverley)

== List of Royal Marines Corps Regimental Sergeant Majors ==
No.	Portrait	Name	Took office	Left office	Time in office	Ref.
1	David Malcolm Stollery MBE	David Malcolm Stollery MBE	1 January 1989	22 January 1990	1 year	
2	John "Jan" Kenneth Palmer MBE	John "Jan" Kenneth Palmer MBE	9 December 1989	4 April 1992	2 years, 3 months	
3	Joseph Desmond "Des" Wassall MBE MM	Joseph Desmond "Des" Wassall MBE MM	1 April 1992	24 April 1994	2 years	
4	W. J. "Willy" S.	W. J. "Willy" S.	21 September 1993	6 March 1995	1 year, 5 months	
5	W. N. M. "Nev" W. MBE	W. N. M. "Nev" W. MBE	4 January 1995	4 April 1998	3 years, 3 months	
6	K. R.	K. R.	2 December 1997	16 November 1999	1 year, 11 months	
7	R. T. MBE	R. T. MBE	13 September 1999	14 October 2002	7 years, 1 month	
8	John Anthony "George" Forster	John Anthony "George" Forster	14 October 2002	28 November 2004	2 years, 1 month	
9	E. A. C. MBE	E. A. C. MBE	29 November 2004	31 January 2007	2 years, 2 months	
10	B. A. "Baz" D. MBE	B. A. "Baz" D. MBE	1 February 2007	19 October 2009	2 years, 8 months	
11	Marc Wicks MBE	Marc Wicks MBE	20 October 2009	14 July 2011	1 year, 8 months	
12	Alistair Iain "Ally" McGill MBE QGM	Alistair Iain "Ally" McGill MBE QGM	21 July 2011	19 November 2014	3 years, 3 months	
13	Philip Steven "Phil" Gilby	Philip Steven "Phil" Gilby	19 November 2014	April 2018	3 years, 4 months	
14	Dave Mason MBE	Dave Mason MBE	April 2018	31 July 2020	2 years, 3 months	
15	Richard Angove	Richard Angove	31 July 2020	9 December 2021	1 year, 4 months	
16	Nick Ollive	Nick Ollive	9 December 2021	May 2024	2 years, 5 months	
17	Tim Jukes	Tim Jukes	June 2024		2 years, 3 months	

== See also ==
- Warrant Officer of the Royal Air Force – Royal Air Force equivalent
- Warrant Officer of the Naval Service – Royal Navy equivalent
- Army Sergeant Major – British Army equivalent
- Senior Enlisted Advisor to the Chiefs of Staff Committee - senior OR to Chiefs of Staff Committee
