= Marc Wicks =

Royal Marine rank

Mark Wicks MBE
- Military career
- Allegiance: United Kingdom
- Branch: Royal Marines
- Service years: 1983–2014
- Rank: Warrant Officer Class 1
- Unit: 42 Commando
- Commands: Senior Enlisted Advisor – NATO Allied Command Transformation; Corps Regimental Sergeant Major
- Conflicts: The Troubles; War in Afghanistan; Iraq War
- Awards: Member of the Order of the British Empire; Navy and Marine Corps Commendation Medal (United States)

Regimental Sergeant Major Marc Wicks, MBE is a former Corps Regimental Sergeant Major of the Royal Marines who went on to serve as Senior Enlisted Advisor to NATO's Allied Command Transformation.

== Military career ==
Wicks was born in Devon and educated at Audley Park Secondary Modern School in Torquay. He joined the Royal Marines in March 1983. He served with 42 Commando in Plymouth. He also served in Norway and qualified as a military ski instructor. In 1984 he deployed to Northern Ireland on Operation Banner, and in 1988 he volunteered to return to Northern Ireland for Operation Internet.

Wicks completed a physical training instructor first class course, qualifying at the top of his class. In 1998 he became the physical training advisor at the United States Marine Corps Officer Candidate School in Quantico, Virginia. While there he was awarded the Navy and Marine Corps Commendation Medal.

After passing the Regimental Sergeant Major's Board, Wicks was appointed as the Regimental Sergeant Major of 42 Commando in March 2005. He completed numerous exercises, deployed to Norway and served in Afghanistan on Operation Herrick 5. On his return from operations he was assigned as the Regimental Sergeant Major of Command Support Training, where he was responsible for the training of all future warrant officers in the Royal Marines. Wicks was awarded the Meritorious Service Medal in 2008.

Wicks was then selected to serve as the Corps Regimental Sergeant Major until June 2011, when he assumed his position at NATO. Wicks took over the role as Allied Command Transformation senior enlisted leader from Command Sergeant Major Ludek Kolesa, from the Czech Republic who held the post from 2007 to 2011, after selection from candidates from all NATO countries.

Military offices
Preceded by Ludek Kolesa	Senior Enlisted Advisor – NATO Allied Command Transformation; 2011–2014	Succeeded by Jack Johnson, Jr
Preceded by Barry Dawe	Corps Regimental Sergeant Major; 2010–2011	Succeeded by Alister McGill
