= Paul Carney (British Army officer) =

British soldier (born 1979)

Major Paul Carney
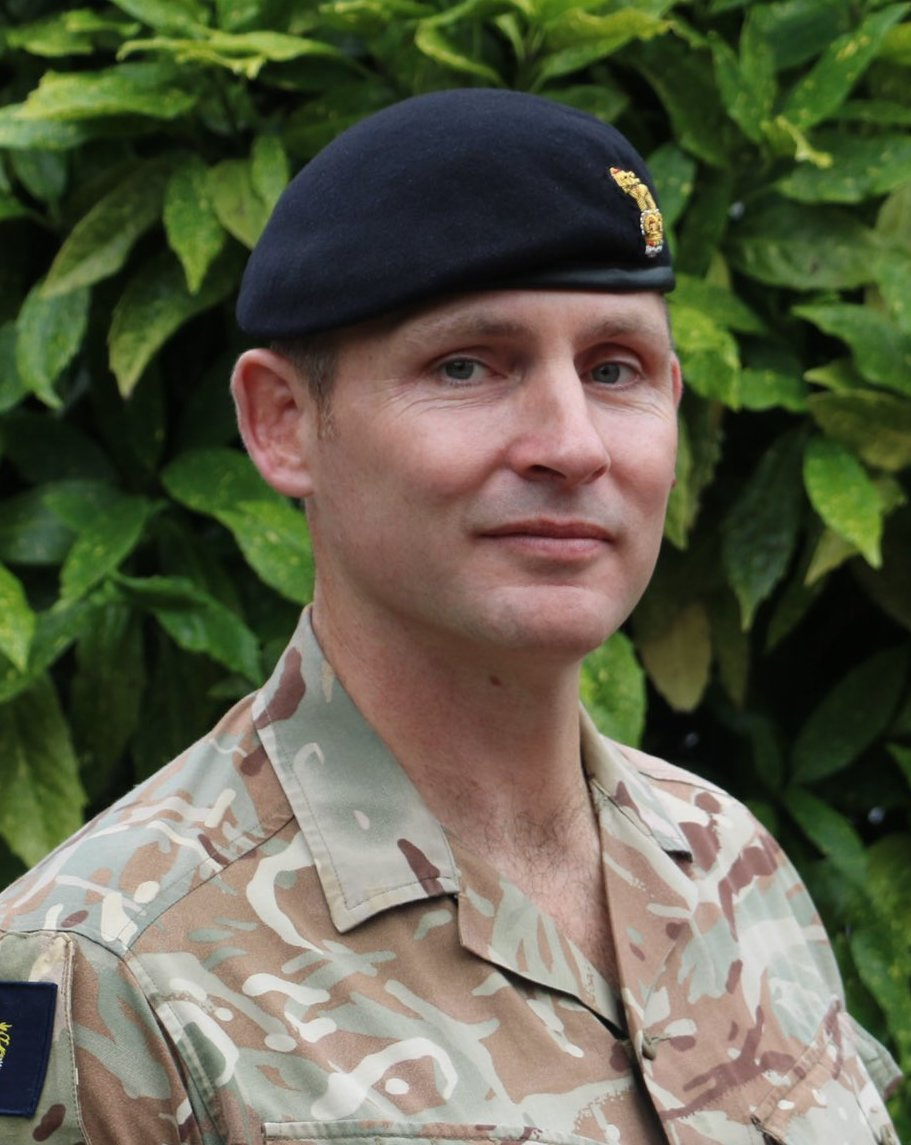
- Born: November 1979 (age 46); Gosport, Hampshire, England
- Military career
- Allegiance: United Kingdom
- Branch: British Army
- Service years: 1997–present
- Rank: Warrant Officer Class 1 (commissioned at major but serves as WO1)
- Unit: Royal Engineers
- Commands: Army Sergeant Major (2021–2025)
- Conflicts: Iraq War; War in Afghanistan

Major Paul Christopher Carney (born November 1979) is a British Army officer. From 2021 to 2025, he served as the Army Sergeant Major, the most senior of the other ranks in the British Army.

== Early life and education ==
Carney was born in November 1979 in Gosport, Hampshire, England. He has a Bachelor of Arts (BA) degree in leadership and management.

== Military career ==
Carney joined the British Army in January 1997. As a soldier of the Royal Engineers, he trained and served as a combat engineer and electrician. He rose to be regimental sergeant major of 22 Engineer Regiment. He then served as command sergeant major (CSM) of 3rd (United Kingdom) Division, and CSM of the Field Army.

Carney serves as a warrant officer but was commissioned as a captain on 2 April 2018. In July 2021, he was appointed the third Army Sergeant Major, thereby becoming the most senior member of the other ranks of the British Army. He was promoted to major on 31 July 2021. He stepped down as Army Sergeant Major in April 2025.

Military offices
Preceded by Gavin Paton	Army Sergeant Major; 2021–2025	Succeeded by John Miller
