= Jon Lord (disambiguation) =

Jon Lord (1941–2012) was an English orchestral and rock composer, and member of Deep Purple

Jon or Jonathan Lord may also refer to:

- Jon Lord (politician) (1956–2014), Canadian politician
- Jonathan Lord (born 1962), British MP for Woking
- Jonathan Lord (criminal)

== See also ==
- John Lord (disambiguation)
