= James Miller (VC 1857) =

James William Miller VC
- Born: 5 May 1820; Glasgow, Scotland
- Died: 12 June 1892 (aged 72); Simla, India
- Burial place: Simla Churchyard
- Military career
- Allegiance: United Kingdom
- Branch: Bengal Army; British Indian Army
- Rank: Major
- Conflicts: Indian Mutiny
- Awards: Victoria Cross

Major James William Miller VC (5 May 1820 – 12 June 1892) was a Scottish recipient of the Victoria Cross, the highest and most prestigious award for gallantry in the face of the enemy that can be awarded to British and Commonwealth forces.

== Details ==
Miller was 37 years old, and a conductor in the Bengal Ordnance Depot, Bengal Army during the Indian Mutiny when the following deed took place on 28 October 1857 near Agra for which he was awarded the VC:

For having, on the 28th of October, 1857, at great personal risk, gone to the assistance of, and carried out of action, a wounded Officer, Lieutenant Glubb, of the late 38th Regiment of Bengal Native Infantry. He was himself subsequently wounded and sent to Agra. Conductor Miller was at the time employed with Heavy howitzers and Ordnance stores attached to a detachment of troops, commanded by the late Colonel Cotton, C.B., in the attack on the above-mentioned date on the rebels who had taken, up their position in the Serai at Futtehpore Sikra near Agra.

The VC award was gazetted on 25 February 1862, after a delay in obtaining the application for the medal from his senior officers.

He later achieved the rank of lieutenant, retired from the Gun Carriage Agency on 10 August 1882 as an honorary major, and died in Simla on 12 June 1892.
