= Gavin Paton =

British soldier

Major Gavin Paton OBE
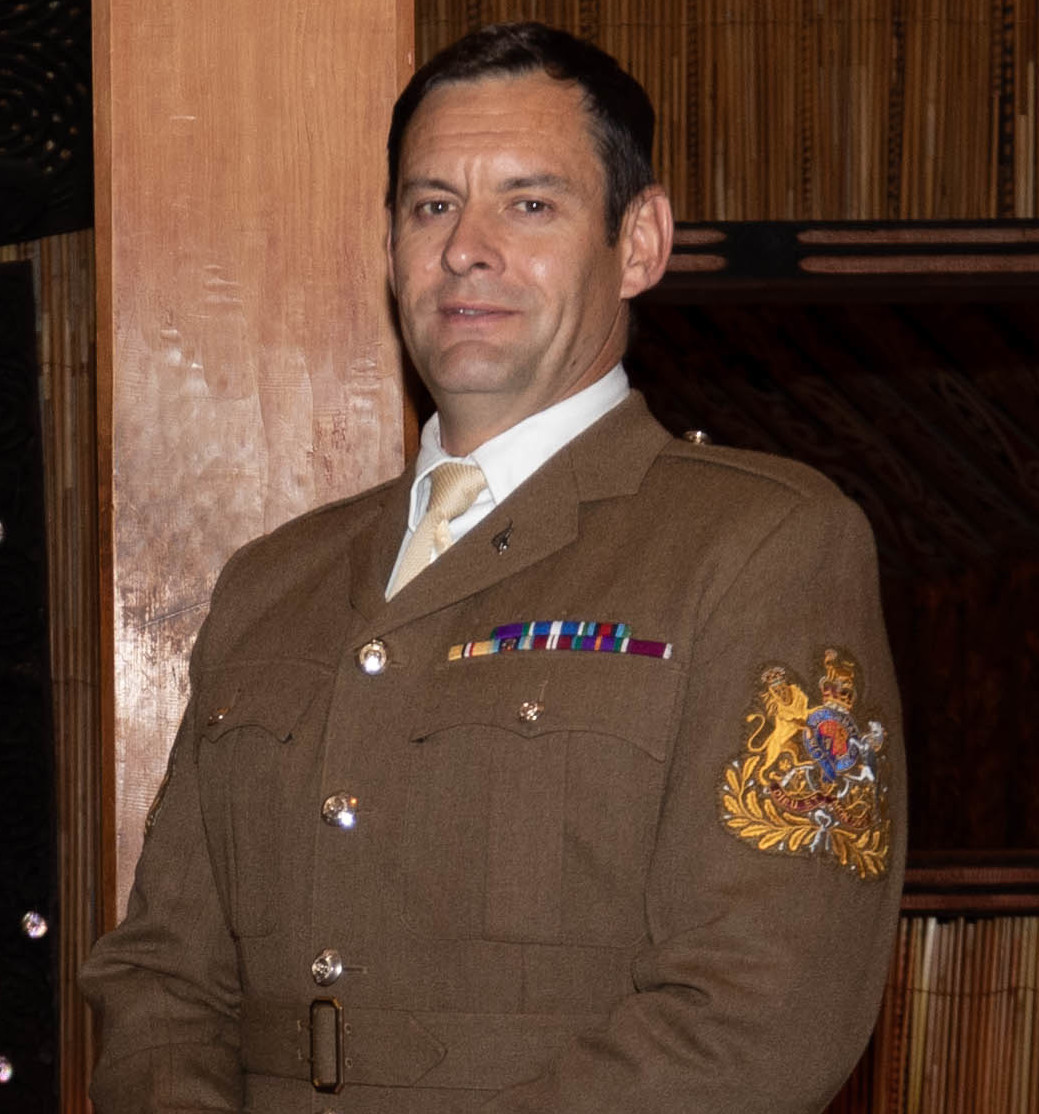
- Paton in 2019
- Born: March 1979 (age 47); Cornwall, England
- Military career
- Allegiance: United Kingdom
- Branch: British Army
- Rank: Major
- Unit: The Rifles
- Commands: Army Sergeant Major (2018–2021)
- Conflicts: Sierra Leone Civil War; Iraq War; War in Afghanistan
- Awards: Officer of the Order of the British Empire

Major Gavin Henderson Paton OBE (born March 1979) is a British Army officer. From 2018 to 2021, he served as the Army Sergeant Major, the most senior warrant officer and member of the other ranks in the British Army.

== Personal life ==
Paton was born in March 1979 in Cornwall, England. He is married to Jessica Paton, and together they have one son.

== Military career ==
Paton served as a warrant officer with 3rd Battalion, The Rifles. He was commissioned as a captain on 23 July 2017, and appointed as Field Army Sergeant Major in 2018.

Paton was appointed Army Sergeant Major in November 2018, thereby becoming the most senior member of the other ranks of the British Army. He was appointed Officer of the Order of the British Empire (OBE) in the 2022 Birthday Honours.

Patton was promoted to major on 19 March 2022. He was awarded a clasp to the Long Service and Good Conduct Medal (Military) in 2023.

Military offices
Preceded by Glenn Haughton	Army Sergeant Major; 2018–2021	Succeeded by Paul Carney
