= John Lord (historian) =

American historian (1810–1894)

John Lord LL.D.
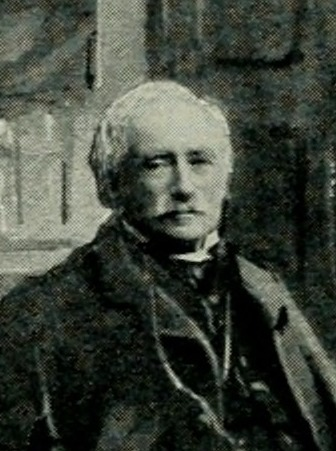
- Born: September 10, 1810; Portsmouth, New Hampshire
- Died: December 15, 1894 (aged 84); Stamford, Connecticut
- Education: Dartmouth College; Andover Theological Seminary; University of the City of New York

John Lord (September 10, 1810 – December 15, 1894) was an American historian and lecturer.

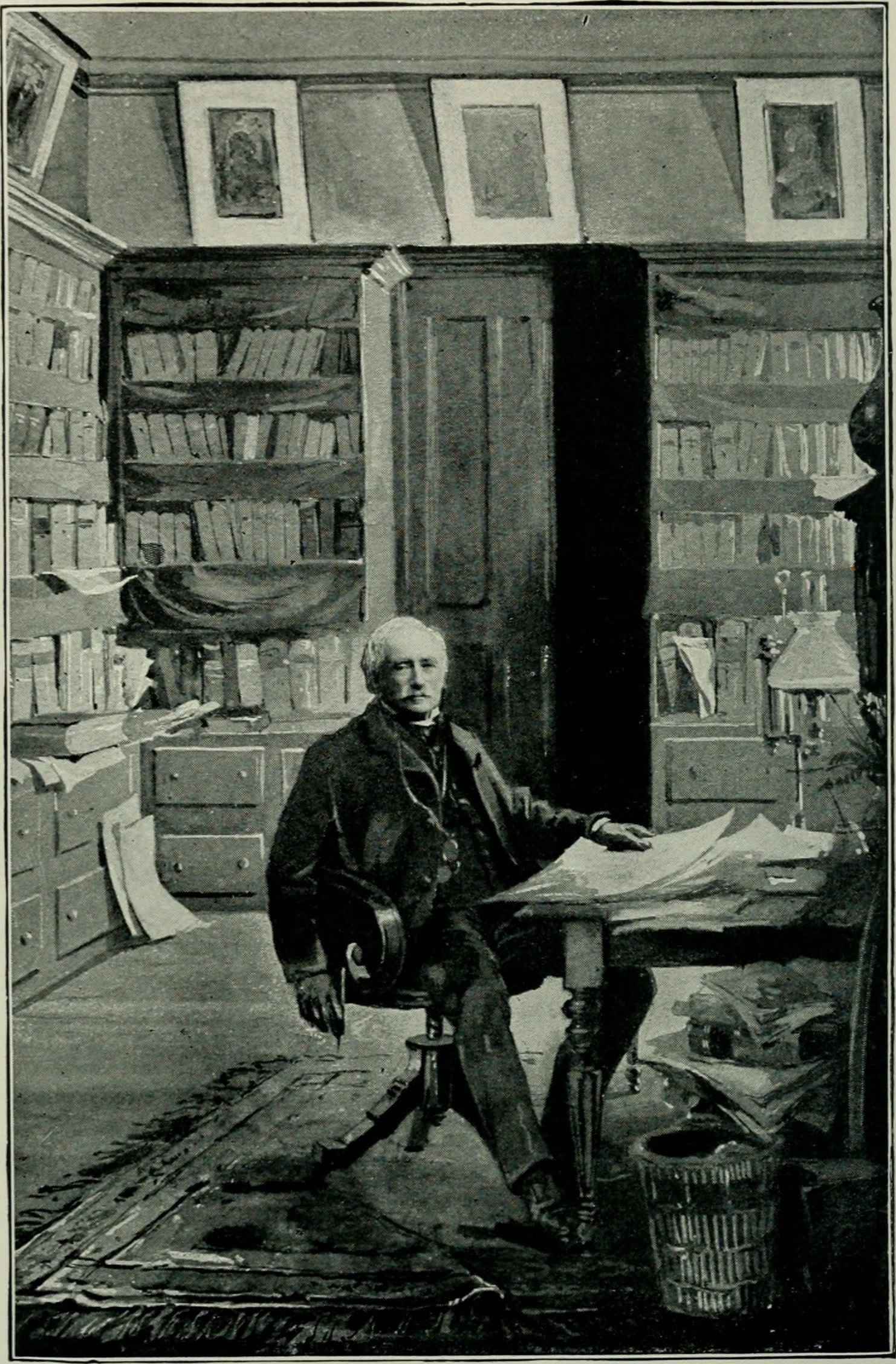
John Lord in his library.

== Biography ==
Born September 10, 1810 in Portsmouth, New Hampshire, he graduated from Dartmouth College in 1833 and then entered the Andover Theological Seminary, where in his second year he wrote a series of lectures on the Dark Ages, which he delivered the next fall during a tour through northern New York. After graduating at Andover he became an agent for the American Peace Society. Though not ordained to the ministry, he was called to a Congregational Church at New Marlborough, Massachusetts, and then to one at Stockbridge, Massachusetts.

In 1840 he gave up his pastoral duties to become a public lecturer and spend time on literary activities. In 1843-46, he was in England giving lectures on the Middle Ages, and on his return to the United States continued to lecture for many years in the principal towns and cities, giving over 6,000 lectures in all. In 1864, he received his LL.D. from the University of the City of New York. From 1866 to 1876, he was lecturer on history at Dartmouth College.

Lord died December 15, 1894, in Stamford, Connecticut.

== Works ==
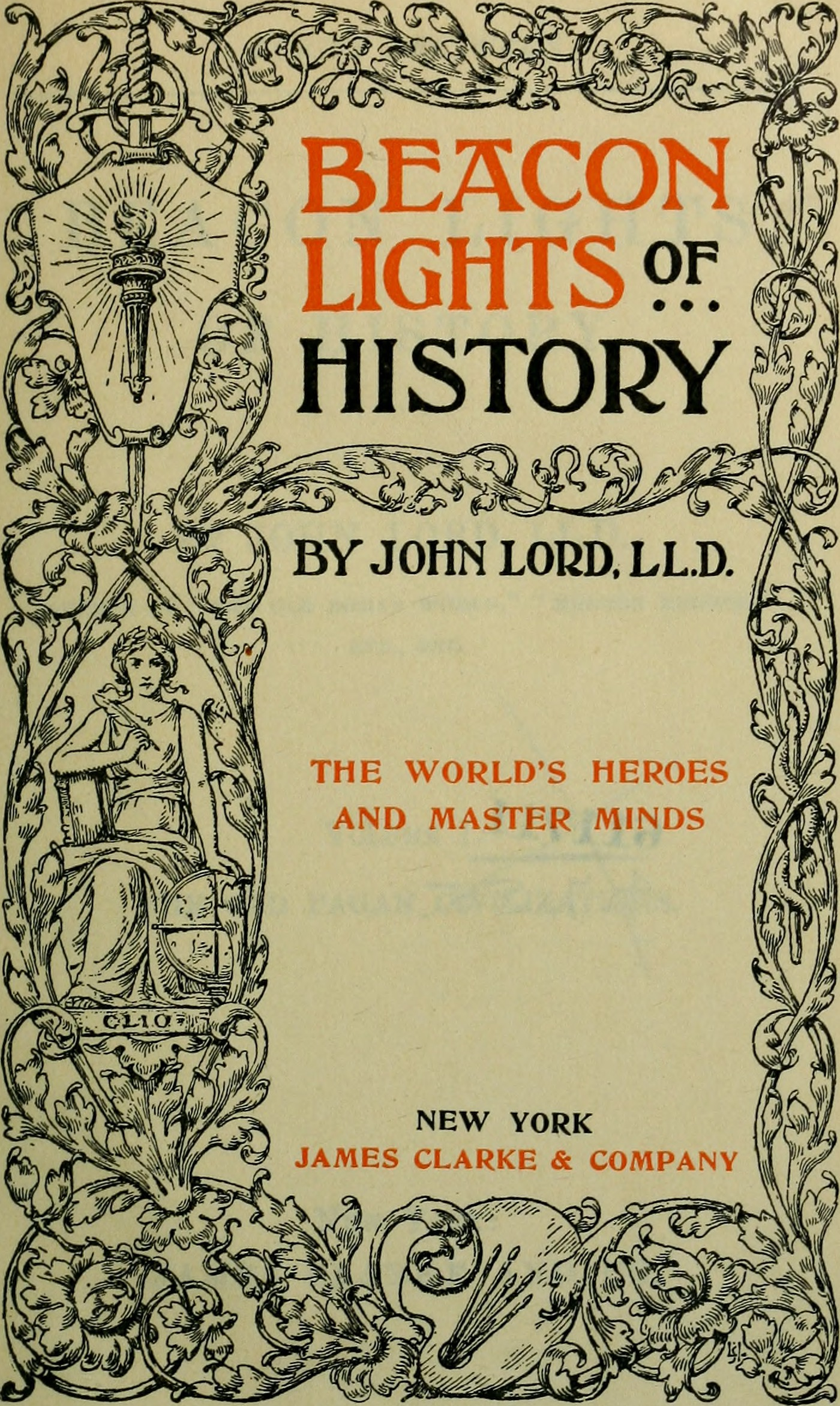
Beacon Lights of History. The world's heroes and master minds (1888)

- Modern History for Schools (1850)
- The Old Roman World (1867)
- Ancient States and Empires (1869)
- Life of Emma Willard (1873)
- Points of History (1881)
- Beacon Lights of History (14 volumes; 1883–96) This covers the old pagan civilisations through to modern Europe and America in his time.
