= Chiefs of Staff Committee =

Committee of the professional heads of the United Kingdom's armed forces

The Tri-Service Badge of the British Armed Forces

The Chiefs of Staff Committee (CSC) is composed of the most senior military personnel in the British Armed Forces, who advise on operational military matters and the preparation and conduct of military operations. The committee consists of the chief of the defence staff, who is the chairman and professional head of the armed forces, and the vice-chief of the defence staff, who is the vice-chairman and deputy professional head of the armed forces. The committee also includes the heads of the three branches of the armed forces – the first sea lord and chief of the naval staff, the chief of the general staff and the chief of the air staff.

== History ==
The Chiefs of Staff Committee was initially established as a sub-committee of the Committee of Imperial Defence in 1923. It remained as such until the abolition of the CID upon the outbreak of World War II in 1939. The initial composition of the committee was the professional heads of the three services, the first sea lord, the chief of the imperial general staff and the chief of the air staff. Each service head took turns being chairman of the committee.

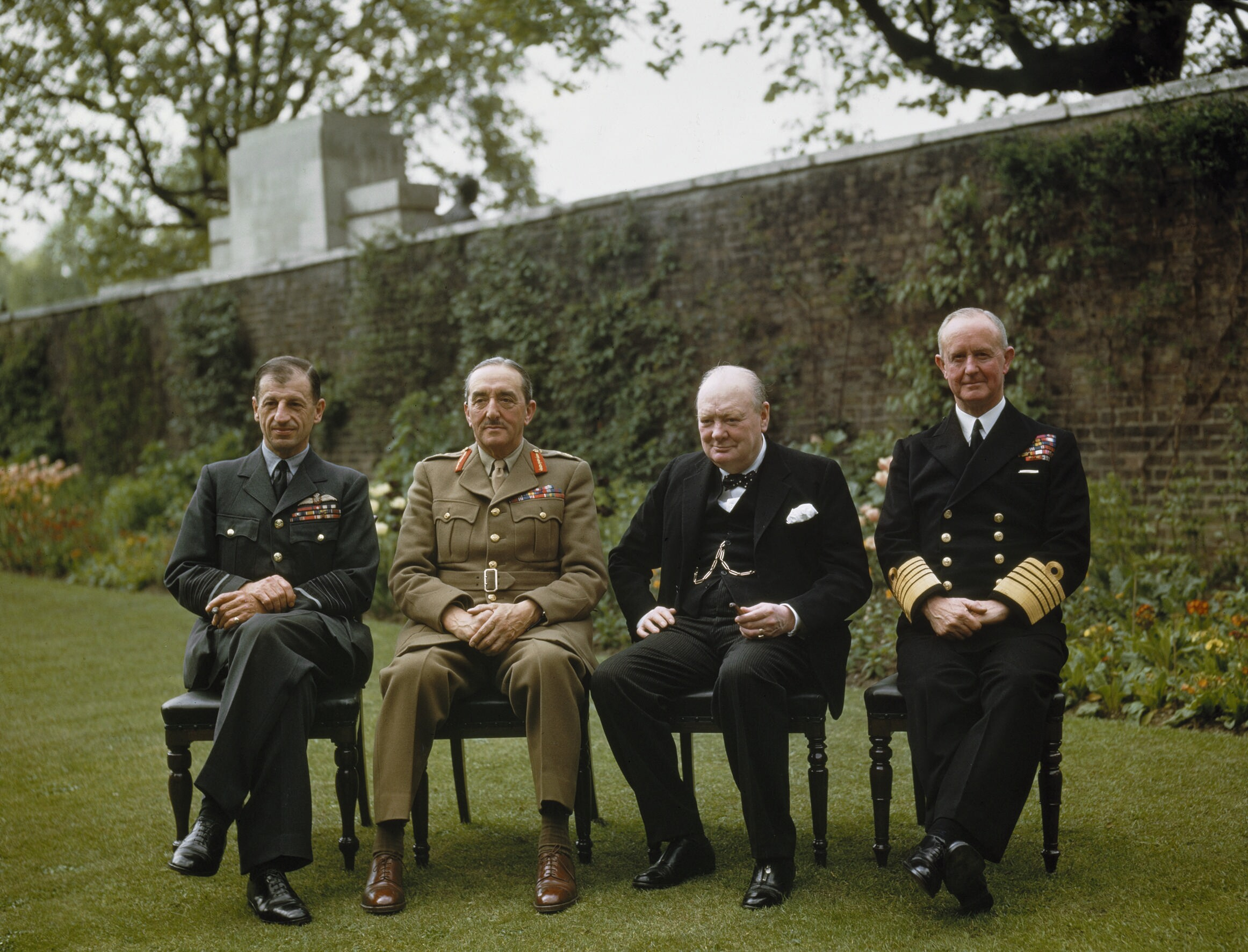
Sir Winston Churchill with Chiefs of Staff

During the Second World War the committee was a sub-committee of the War Cabinet, and in addition to the three service chiefs, it had an additional member, in the person of General Sir Hastings Ismay, who acted as its secretary. Subcommittees of the committee were also formed, including the Joint Planning Staff and Joint Intelligence Committee. The Chiefs of Staff Committee was responsible for the overall conduct of the British Armed Forces part of the war effort. When matters required joint Anglo-American decision, the Chiefs of Staff Committee members formed part of the Combined Chiefs of Staff, meeting in concert with their American counterparts, the Joint Chiefs of Staff. The Combined Chiefs of Staff were based in Washington, so for most of the time the Chiefs of Staff were represented at meetings by the British Joint Staff Mission.

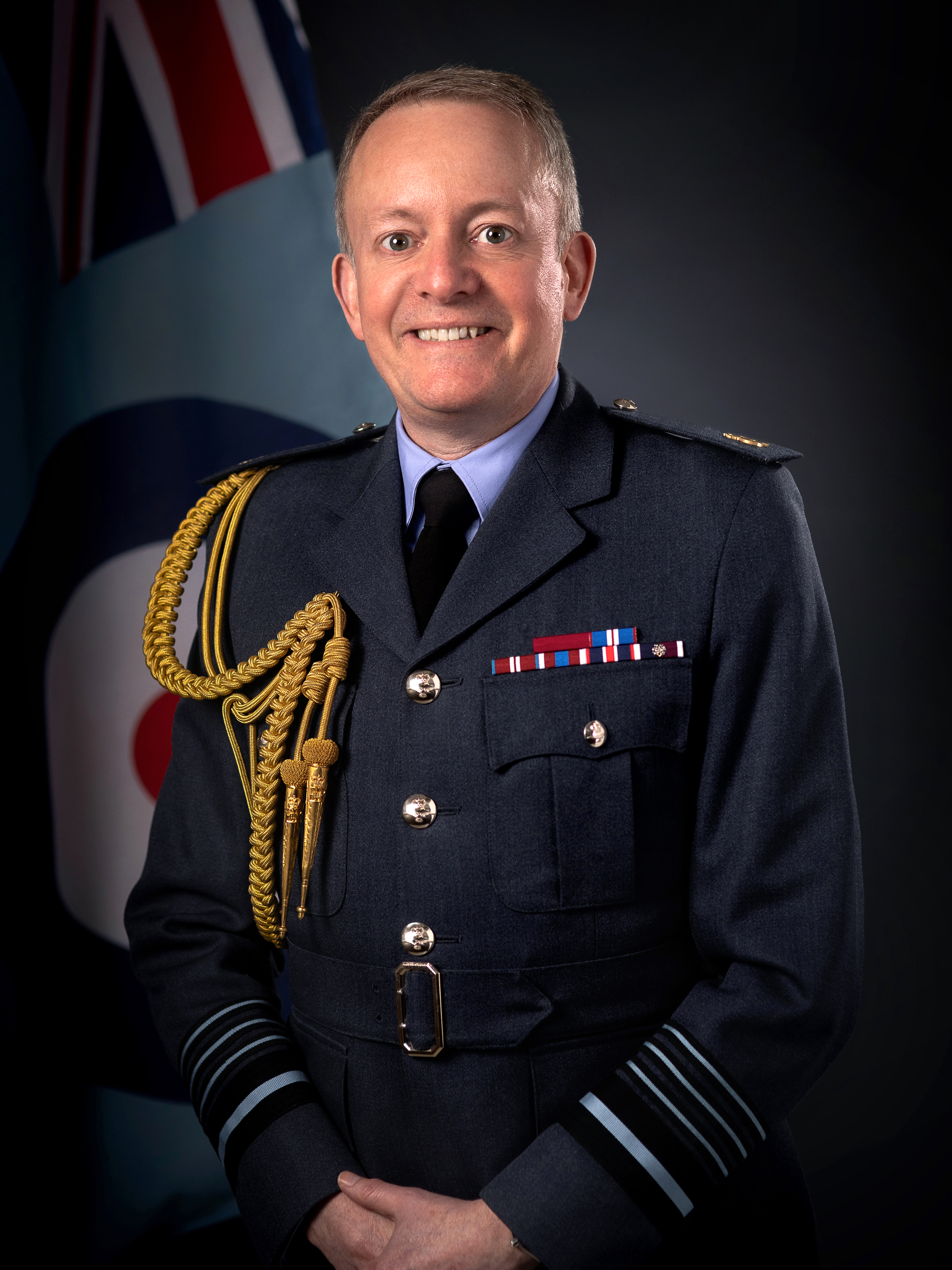
Air Chief Marshal Sir Richard Knighton, 25th and current chief of the defence staff (chair)

Following World War II, the Chiefs of Staff Committee was transferred to the Ministry of Defence.

In 1955 the Government decided to create the post of chairman of the Chiefs of Staff Committee. The post came into existence on 1 January 1956 and the only incumbent was Marshal of the Royal Air Force Sir William Dickson who served until 1 January 1959 when he became the first chief of the defence staff. The CDS remained as chairman of the committee and was also recognized as the professional head of the British Armed Forces. In 1964, the post of chief of the imperial general staff was discontinued and the Army was thereafter represented by the chief of the general staff. Since then, the only major changes have been the appointment of the vice-chief of the defence staff to act as a deputy to the CDS and the inclusion of the commander, Joint Forces Command on the committee.

=== Senior Enlisted Advisor ===
A senior enlisted advisor to the Chiefs of Staff Committee was appointed on 1 November 2018 to provide advice to the committee on the views of other ranks.

== Membership ==
The current membership of the Chiefs of Staff Committee:

Office	Photograph	Incumbent	Incumbent since	Service
Chief of the Defence Staff (Chair)		Air Chief Marshal Sir Richard Knighton KCB ADC FREng	September 2025	Royal Air Force
Vice-Chief of the Defence Staff (Vice-Chair)		General Dame Sharon Nesmith DCB ADC Gen	June 2024	British Army
First Sea Lord and Chief of the Naval Staff		General Sir Gwyn Jenkins KCB OBE ADC	May 2025	Royal Marines
Chief of the General Staff		General Sir Roland Walker KCB DSO ADC Gen	June 2024	British Army
Chief of the Air Staff		Air Chief Marshal Sir Harvey Smyth KCB OBE DFC ADC	August 2025	Royal Air Force
Commander of Cyber & Specialist Operations Command		General Sir Robert Magowan KCB CBE	March 2026	Royal Marines
Also in attendance
Senior Enlisted Advisor to the Chiefs of Staff Committee		Warrant Officer Class One Sarah Cox	March 2025	British Army

== Role ==
The role of the committee is to provide advice on operational military matters and the preparation and conduct of military operations.

== See also ==
- Defence Council of the United Kingdom
- Admiralty Board
- Army Board
- Air Force Board
