= Staff sergeant major =

Military rank or appointment

Staff sergeant major is an appointment in some Commonwealth armies and also a rank in the Royal Canadian Mounted Police.

== Canada ==
Staff sergeant major is a Royal Canadian Mounted Police (RCMP) rank above staff sergeant but junior to sergeant major.

== Israel ==
Staff Sergeant Major is an Israel Police and Israel Border Police (Magav) rank junior to Advanced Staff Sergeant Major.

== United Kingdom ==
Staff sergeant major (SSM) is an appointment in the British Army held by warrant officers class 1 in the Royal Logistic Corps who are not conductors or regimental sergeant majors.

Staff sergeant majors existed in the Army Service Corps and Ordnance Store Branch in the 19th century. In 1896, however, staff sergeant majors in the new Army Ordnance Corps were renamed sub-conductors (becoming staff sergeant majors again in 1967). Staff sergeant majors remained in the Army Service Corps, later the Royal Army Service Corps, and continued when it became the Royal Corps of Transport in 1965. The appointment passed to the new Royal Logistic Corps in 1993.

In 1892, conductors of supplies in the Army Service Corps were renamed staff sergeant majors 1st class. Like the conductors, they wore their royal arms rank badge in a wreath. The appointment has now been abolished.
