= Chief of the General Staff (United Kingdom) =

Head of the British Army

- Car flag of the Chief of the General Staff

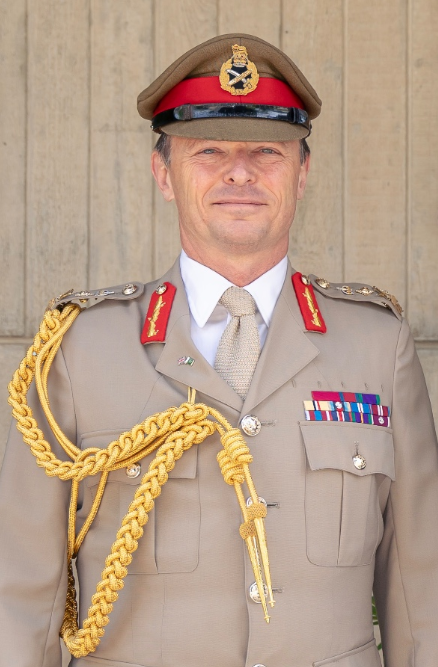
- Incumbent; General Sir Roland Walker since 15 June 2024
- Ministry of Defence; British Army
- Style: General
- Abbreviation: CGS
- Member of: Defence Council; Army Board; Chiefs of Staff Committee
- Reports to: Chief of the Defence Staff
- Nominator: Secretary of State for Defence
- Appointer: The Monarch; On the advice of the Prime Minister
- Term length: No fixed length
- Precursor: Commander-in-Chief of the Forces
- Formation: 1904, 1964
- First holder: Sir Neville Lyttelton
- Deputy: Deputy Chief of the General Staff
- Website: Official website

Chief of the General Staff (CGS) has been the title of the professional head of the British Army since 1964. The CGS is a member of both the Chiefs of Staff Committee and the Army Board; he is also the chair of the executive committee of the Army Board. Prior to 1964, the title was Chief of the Imperial General Staff (CIGS). Since 1959, the post has been immediately subordinate to the Chief of the Defence Staff, the post held by the professional head of the British Armed Forces.

The current Chief of the General Staff is General Sir Roland Walker, who succeeded General Sir Patrick Sanders in the role on 15 June 2024.

== Responsibilities ==
The Chief of the General Staff (CGS) is the professional head of the Army, with responsibility for developing and generating military capability from an integrated Army (Regular and Reserve) and for maintaining the fighting effectiveness, efficiency and morale of the Service. The CGS reports to the Chief of the Defence Staff (CDS) and, as a Service COS, has a right of direct access to the Secretary of State and the Prime Minister. The CGS is a member of the Defence Council and the Army Board, the Armed Forces Committee, the Chiefs of Staff Committee and the Senior Appointments Committee. Responsible for:

- Maintains the institutional health of the Army by exercising Full Command responsibility for all Army personnel
- Ensures the efficient and effective governance of the service
- Chairs the executive committee of the Army Board and the Army Command Group
- Contributes to the conduct of defence higher level business, with a particular responsibility for providing specialist advice on Army matters
- Develops future Army capability within the context of Defence strategic direction and resource allocation
- Leads the senior management team of the British Army

== Background ==
The title was also used for five years between the demise of the Commander-in-Chief of the Forces in 1904 and the introduction of Chief of the Imperial General Staff in 1909. The post was then held by General Sir Neville Lyttelton and, briefly, by Field Marshal Sir William Nicholson.

Throughout the existence of the post the Chief of the General Staff has been the First Military Member of the Army Board.

Professional heads of the English/British Armed Forces
	Royal Navy	British Army	Royal Air Force	Combined
1645	N/A	Commander-in-Chief of the Forces (1645/60–1904, intermittently)	Not established	
1689	Senior Naval Lord (1689–1771)	Commander-in-Chief of the Forces (1645/60–1904, intermittently)	Not established	
1771	First Naval Lord (1771–1904)	Commander-in-Chief of the Forces (1645/60–1904, intermittently)	Not established	
1904	First Sea Lord (1904–1917)	Chief of the General Staff (1904–1909)	Not established	Inter-service co-ordination was carried out from 1904 by the Committee of Imperial Defence under the chairmanship of the Prime Minister
1909	First Sea Lord (1904–1917)	Chief of the Imperial General Staff (1909–1964)	Not established	Inter-service co-ordination was carried out from 1904 by the Committee of Imperial Defence under the chairmanship of the Prime Minister
1917	First Sea Lord and Chief of the Naval Staff (1917–present)	Chief of the Imperial General Staff (1909–1964)	Not established	Inter-service co-ordination was carried out from 1904 by the Committee of Imperial Defence under the chairmanship of the Prime Minister
1918	First Sea Lord and Chief of the Naval Staff (1917–present)	Chief of the Imperial General Staff (1909–1964)	Chief of the Air Staff (1918–present)	Inter-service co-ordination was carried out from 1904 by the Committee of Imperial Defence under the chairmanship of the Prime Minister
1923	First Sea Lord and Chief of the Naval Staff (1917–present)	Chief of the Imperial General Staff (1909–1964)	Chief of the Air Staff (1918–present)	Chairman of the Chiefs of Staff Committee (1923–1959, held by one of the service heads until 1956)
1959	First Sea Lord and Chief of the Naval Staff (1917–present)	Chief of the Imperial General Staff (1909–1964)	Chief of the Air Staff (1918–present)	Chief of the Defence Staff (1959–present)
1964	First Sea Lord and Chief of the Naval Staff (1917–present)	Chief of the General Staff (1964–present)	Chief of the Air Staff (1918–present)	Chief of the Defence Staff (1959–present)

== Roles ==
The Chief was responsible for commanding the entire British Army. During the Second World War, General Brooke focused on grand strategy, and his relationships, through the Combined Chiefs of Staff with his American counterparts. He was also responsible for the appointment and evaluation of senior commanders, allocation of manpower and equipment, and the organisation of tactical air forces in support of land operations of field commanders; he also had primary responsibility for supervising the military operations of the Free French, Polish, Dutch, Belgian, and Czech units reporting to their governments in exile in London. Brooke vigorously allocated responsibilities to his deputies, and despite the traditional historical distrust that had existed between the military and the political side of the War Office, he got along quite well with his counterpart, the Secretary of State for War, first David Margesson and later, Sir James Grigg.

== Appointees ==
The following table lists all those who have held the post of Chief of the General Staff or its preceding positions. Ranks and honours are as at the completion of their tenure:

No.	Portrait	Name	Took office	Left office	Time in office	Ref.
Chiefs of the General Staff
1	Sir Neville Lyttelton	General; Sir Neville Lyttelton (1845–1931)	12 February 1904	2 April 1908	4 years, 50 days	
2	Sir William Nicholson	Field Marshal; Sir William Nicholson (1845–1918)	2 April 1908	22 November 1909	1 year, 234 days	
Chiefs of the Imperial General Staff
2	Sir William Nicholson	Field Marshal; Sir William Nicholson (1845–1918)	22 November 1909	15 March 1912	2 years, 114 days	
3	Sir John French	Field Marshal; Sir John French (1852–1925)	15 March 1912	6 April 1914	2 years, 22 days	
4	Sir Charles Douglas	General; Sir Charles Douglas (1850–1914)	6 April 1914	25 October 1914 †	202 days	
5	Sir James Wolfe Murray	Lieutenant General; Sir James Wolfe Murray (1853–1919)	25 October 1914	26 September 1915	1 year, 154 days	
6	Sir Archibald Murray	Lieutenant-General; Sir Archibald Murray (1860–1945)	26 September 1915	23 December 1915	88 days	
7	Sir William Robertson	General; Sir William Robertson (1860–1933)	23 December 1915	19 February 1918	2 years, 58 days	
8	Sir Henry Wilson	Field Marshal; Sir Henry Wilson (1864–1922)	19 February 1918	19 February 1922	4 years	
9	Rudolph Lambart, 10th Earl of Cavan	Field Marshal; Rudolph Lambart, 10th Earl of Cavan (1865–1946)	19 February 1922	19 February 1926	4 years	
10	Sir George Milne	Field Marshal; Sir George Milne (1866–1948)	19 February 1926	19 February 1933	7 years	
11	Sir Archibald Montgomery-Massingberd	Field Marshal; Sir Archibald Montgomery-Massingberd (1871–1947)	19 February 1933	15 May 1936	3 years, 86 days	
12	Sir Cyril Deverell	Field Marshal; Sir Cyril Deverell (1874–1947)	15 May 1936	6 December 1937	1 year, 205 days	
13	John Vereker, 6th Viscount Gort	General; John Vereker, 6th Viscount Gort (1886–1946)	6 December 1937	3 September 1939	1 year, 271 days	
14	Sir Edmund Ironside	General; Sir Edmund Ironside (1880–1959)	4 September 1939	26 May 1940	266 days	
15	Sir John Dill	Field Marshal; Sir John Dill (1881–1944)	26 May 1940	25 December 1941	1 year, 213 days	
16	Alan Brooke, 1st Viscount Alanbrooke	Field Marshal; Alan Brooke, 1st Viscount Alanbrooke (1883–1963)	25 December 1941	25 June 1946	4 years, 182 days	
17	Bernard Montgomery, 1st Viscount Montgomery of Alamein	Field Marshal; Bernard Montgomery, 1st Viscount Montgomery of Alamein (1887–1976)	26 June 1946	1 November 1948	2 years, 129 days	
18	Sir William Slim	Field Marshal; Sir William Slim (1891–1970)	1 November 1948	1 November 1952	4 years	
19	Sir John Harding	Field Marshal; Sir John Harding (1896–1989)	1 November 1952	29 September 1955	2 years, 332 days	
20	Sir Gerald Templer	Field Marshal; Sir Gerald Templer (1898–1979)	29 September 1955	29 September 1958	3 years	
21	Sir Francis Festing	Field Marshal; Sir Francis Festing (1902–1976)	29 September 1958	1 November 1961	3 years, 33 days	
22	Sir Richard Hull	General; Sir Richard Hull (1902–1989)	1 November 1961	April 1964	2 years, 5 months	
Chiefs of the General Staff
22	Sir Richard Hull	Field Marshal; Sir Richard Hull (1902–1989) (Note: Later served as Chief of the Defence Staff.)	April 1964	8 February 1965	10 months	-
23	Sir James Cassels	Field Marshal; Sir James Cassels (1907–1996)	8 February 1965	1 March 1968	3 years, 22 days	
24	Sir Geoffrey Baker	Field Marshal; Sir Geoffrey Baker (1912–1980) (Note: Later made Constable of the Tower of London.)	1 March 1968	1 April 1971	3 years, 31 days	
25	Sir Michael Carver	Field Marshal; Sir Michael Carver (1915–2001)	1 April 1971	19 July 1973	2 years, 109 days	
26	Sir Peter Hunt	General; Sir Peter Hunt (1916–1988)	19 July 1973	15 July 1976	2 years, 362 days	
27	Sir Roland Gibbs	Field Marshal; Sir Roland Gibbs (1921–2004)	15 July 1976	14 July 1979	2 years, 364 days	
28	Sir Edwin Bramall	Field Marshal; Sir Edwin Bramall (1923–2019)	14 July 1979	1 August 1982	3 years, 18 days	
29	Sir John Stanier	Field Marshal; Sir John Stanier (1925–2007)	1 August 1982	28 July 1985	2 years, 361 days	
30	Sir Nigel Bagnall	Field Marshal; Sir Nigel Bagnall (1927–2002)	28 July 1985	10 September 1988	3 years, 44 days	
31	Sir John Chapple	Field Marshal; Sir John Chapple (1931–2022)	10 September 1988	14 February 1992	3 years, 157 days	
32	Sir Peter Inge	General; Sir Peter Inge (1935–2022)	14 February 1992	15 March 1994	2 years, 29 days	
33	Sir Charles Guthrie	General; Sir Charles Guthrie (1938–2025)	15 March 1994	3 February 1997	2 years, 325 days	
34	Sir Roger Wheeler	General; Sir Roger Wheeler (born 1941)	3 February 1997	17 April 2000	3 years, 74 days	
35	Sir Michael Walker	General; Sir Michael Walker (born 1944)	17 April 2000	1 February 2003	2 years, 290 days	
36	Sir Mike Jackson	General; Sir Mike Jackson (1944–2024)	1 February 2003	29 August 2006	3 years, 209 days	
37	Sir Richard Dannatt	General; Sir Richard Dannatt (born 1950)	29 August 2006	28 August 2009	2 years, 364 days	
38	Sir David Richards	General; Sir David Richards (born 1952)	28 August 2009	15 September 2010	1 year, 18 days	
39	Sir Peter Wall	General; Sir Peter Wall (born 1955)	15 September 2010	5 September 2014	3 years, 355 days	
40	Sir Nick Carter	General; Sir Nick Carter (born 1959)	5 September 2014	11 June 2018	3 years, 279 days	
41	Sir Mark Carleton-Smith	General; Sir Mark Carleton-Smith (born 1964)	11 June 2018	13 June 2022	4 years, 2 days	
42	Sir Patrick Sanders	General; Sir Patrick Sanders (born 1966)	13 June 2022	15 June 2024	2 years, 2 days	
43	Sir Roland Walker	General; Sir Roland Walker (born 1970)	15 June 2024	Incumbent	2 years, 146 days	

== See also ==
- Chief of the Defence Staff
- First Sea Lord / Chief of the Naval Staff
- Chief of the Air Staff
- Deputy Chief of the General Staff

== Bibliography ==
- Fraser, David (1997). Alanbrooke. HarperCollins. ISBN 9780006388630.
- Hamilton, Nigel (1986). Monty: Final Years of the Field Marshal 1944–1976. McGraw-Hill. ISBN 9780070258075.
