= John Lord (British Army soldier) =

British military leader

John Clifford Lord
- Born: 26 April 1908; Southport, Lancashire, England
- Died: 21 January 1968 (aged 59); Camberley, England
- Burial place: Royal Military Academy Sandhurst
- Spouse: Audrey Lord
- Military career
- Allegiance: United Kingdom
- Branch: British Army
- Service years: 1933-1963
- Rank: Regimental sergeant major
- Nickname: The Voice
- Conflicts: Tunisia; Sicily; Operation Market Garden; Second World War
- Awards: Order of the British Empire; Royal Victorian Order

John Clifford Lord (26 April 1908 – 21 January 1968) was a former regimental sergeant major (RSM) and first academy sergeant major at Royal Military Academy Sandhurst. He also notably participated in the Battle of Arnhem during Operation Market Garden in September 1944 as a member of the 3rd Parachute Brigade (United Kingdom) as a British Army paratrooper who saw service during the Second World War. After being captured by the Nazi Army and imprisoned in Stalag XI-B, he was known for his courage and leadership. He insisted that the prisoners dress properly, instituting morning parades and physical training. When the guards deserted the camp in April 1945, Lord organized formal guard duties on the camp gates and the liberating troops were astonished to find a disciplined, organized camp with the prisoners better dressed than themselves.

== Media ==
On 30 Nov 1959, Lord was the subject of an episode of This Is Your Life (British TV series) where he reconnected with many of his former Army colleagues and cadets including King Hussein and Roy Urquhart.
