= Senior Enlisted Advisor to the Chiefs of Staff Committee =

Title in the British Armed Forces

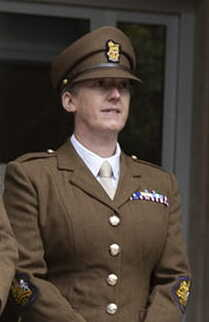
- Incumbent; Warrant Officer Class One Sarah Cox since March 2025
- British Armed Forces
- Abbreviation: SEAC
- Reports to: Chiefs of Staff Committee
- Appointer: Chief of the Defence Staff
- Formation: 1 November 2018
- First holder: Glenn Haughton

Senior Enlisted Advisor to the Chiefs of Staff Committee (SEAC) is the title of the most senior member of the other ranks of the British Armed Forces. The role of the SEAC is to advise the Chiefs of Staff Committee, contribute to policy and decision making, and "bring the perspective of the Warrant Officers, Non-Commissioned Officers and Junior Ranks". The first SEAC took up the appointment on 1 November 2018.

The use of the term enlisted in the title of the position is a departure from the usual British practice of referring to soldiers who do not hold a commission as other ranks.

== List of Senior Enlisted Advisors ==
| No. | Portrait | Name | Took office | Left office | Time in office | Defence branch | Ref. |
|---|---|---|---|---|---|---|---|
| 1 | Glenn Haughton OBE | Warrant Officer Class One; Glenn Haughton OBE (born 1972) | 1 November 2018 | 9 December 2021 | 2 years, 272 days | British Army | |
| 2 | Richard Angove | Warrant Officer Class One; Richard Angove (born 1974) | 9 December 2021 | March 2025 | 4 years, 272 days | Royal Marines | |
| 3 | Sarah Cox | Warrant Officer Class One; Sarah Cox | March 2025 | | | British Army | |

== See also ==
- Senior Enlisted Advisor to the Chairman – US Armed Forces equivalent
