= Army Board =

Governing body of the British Army

- Car flag of a military member of the Army Board

Agency overview
- Formed: 1964
- Preceding agency: Army Council
- Jurisdiction: United Kingdom
- Headquarters: Whitehall, Westminster, London
- Agency executive: Wes Streeting - Secretary of State for Defence; Army Board Chairman
- Parent agency: Ministry of Defence

The Army Board is the top single-service management committee of the British Army, and has always been staffed by senior politicians and soldiers. Until 1964 it was known as the Army Council.

== Membership of the Board ==
The composition is as follows:

- Civilian
  - Secretary of State for Defence
  - Minister of State for the Armed Forces
  - Minister for Defence Equipment, Support and Technology
  - Under Secretary of State for Defence and Minister for Veterans
  - Permanent Under-Secretary of State for Defence
  - Second Permanent Under-Secretary of State for Defence (Secretary of the Army Board)
- British Army
  - Chief of the General Staff
  - Deputy Chief of the General Staff
  - Assistant Chief of the General Staff
  - Commander Home Command
  - Commander Field Army
  - Chief of Materiel (Land)
  - Army Sergeant Major

The Executive Committee of the Army Board (ECAB) dictates the policy required for the Army to function efficiently and meet the aims required by the Defence Council and government. The Chief of the General Staff is the chairman of the Executive Committee of the Army Board.

In 2015, the newly created Army Sergeant Major became the first Army representative not a commissioned officer to be a member of the Executive Committee of the Army Board.

== Former members of the board ==
Included:

- Adjutant-General to the Forces, (military)
- Quartermaster-General to the Forces, (military)
- Master-General of the Ordnance, (military)
- Vice-Chief of the General Staff, (military)
- Chief Scientist (Army), (civil)
- Deputy Under Secretary of State (Army), (civil)
- Permanent Under Secretary of State (Administration), (civil)

== See also ==
- Air Force Board – for the RAF
- Admiralty Board – for the Royal Navy

== Sources ==
- Holmes, Richard (2011), Soldiers: Army Lives and Loyalties from Redcoats to Dusty Warriors, UK: Harper Collins, pp. 22–23, ISBN 9780007457724
