= Ranks and insignia of the other ranks of the British Army =

"Other ranks" (ORs) is the term used to refer to all ranks below commissioned officer in the British Army and the Royal Marines. It includes warrant officers, non-commissioned officers ("NCOs") and ordinary soldiers with the rank of private or regimental equivalent.

== Ranks ==
Rank insignia of the other ranks of the British Army
Rank group	Warrant officers				Senior NCOs			Junior NCOs		Soldiers	
NATO code	OR-9		OR-8		OR-7	OR-6	OR-5	OR-4	OR-3	OR-2	OR-1
Insignia										No insignia	
Typical appointment	Corps/command sergeant major (Note: The appointments of: Army command sergeant major; Command sergeant majors (including Royal Artillery sergeant major and the academy sergeant major, RMAS); Garrison sergeant major London district (royal arms on a four-bar chevron); Conductor, RLC (royal arms in a blue wreath); Master gunner, RA)	Regimental sergeant major (Note: The appointments of: Garrison sergeant major (except London district); Regimental corporal major; Regimental sergeant major; WO1 bandmaster (royal arms above a band badge); Staff sergeant major; RLC or AGC(SPS) sergeant major; Any other WO1 appointment on the establishment of a unit or corps e.g. artificer sergeant major, superintending draughtsman)	Regimental quartermaster sergeant (Note: The appointments of: Garrison quartermaster sergeant; Regimental quartermaster corporal/sergeant; Regimental quartermaster corporal/sergeant (technical); Staff quartermaster sergeant; Quartermaster sergeant instructor; Quartermaster sergeant; Farrier quartermaster corporal/sergeant; WO2 bandmaster (large crown))	Squadron/battery/company sergeant major (Note: The appointments of: Squadron corporal major; Squadron, battery or company sergeant major (troop sergeant major in the Royal Horse Artillery only); WO2 bugle, drum, pipe or trumpet major (four-bar chevron, point upwards, below a large crown below a bugle, drum, pipes or crossed trumpets respectively); Any other WO2 appointment on the establishment of a unit or corps e.g. warrant officer instructor, class 2 (physical training))	Squadron/battery/company quartermaster sergeant (Note: The appointments of: Squadron quartermaster corporal; Squadron, battery or company quartermaster sergeant (troop quartermaster sergeant in the Royal Horse Artillery only); Colour sergeant or company quartermaster sergeant (foot guards and infantry); Staff sergeant rank bugle, drum, pipe or trumpet major (four-bar chevron, point upwards, below a small crown below a bugle, drum, pipes or crossed trumpets respectively); Any other staff sergeant appointment on the establishment of a unit e.g. clerk of works staff sergeant; staff sergeant instructor; artificer staff sergeant, staff sergeant rank bandmaster)						
Rank	Warrant officer class 1		Warrant officer class 2		Staff/colour sergeant	Sergeant (Note: Also the appointments of: Sergeant rank bugle, drum, pipe or trumpet major; Any other sergeant appointment on the establishment of a unit e.g. pioneer sergeant, sergeant instructor, band sergeant)		Corporal	Lance corporal	Private (or equivalent) (Note: Trooper; Gunner; Sapper; Signaller; Guardsman; Fusilier; Kingsman; Rifleman; Ranger; Airtrooper; Craftsman; Musician)	
Abbreviation	WO1		WO2		SSgt/CSgt	Sgt		Cpl	LCpl	Pte	

=== Role ===
Rank	Typical command size or appointment	Typical time taken for a promotion
Warrant officer class 1	Referred to individually by appointment. The most senior advisors to battalions and commanding officers. Responsible for the discipline and equipment of officers and soldiers.	18 years with an outstanding service record.
Warrant officer class 2	Referred to individually by appointment. A senior management role of squadrons, batteries and companies.	N/A
Staff/colour sergeant	Management role of a squadron, battery or company, or serves as platoon commander.	After a few years as a sergeant.
Sergeant	Second in command of a troop or platoon.	After serving for 12 years.
Corporal	Generally commands a section or a single tank.	After serving for 6–8 years.
Lance corporal	Second in command of a section, or leader of a fire team.	Finished phase 2 training or after 3 years as a private.
Private	No command.	Finished phase 1 training.

== Variants ==
=== Privates ===
Many units do not use the rank "Private", using instead:

- "Airtrooper" in the Army Air Corps
- "Craftsman" in the Royal Electrical and Mechanical Engineers
- "Drummer", "trumpeter", "bugler", "piper" and "musician" in various military bands and musicians in other units
- "Fusilier" in the Royal Regiment of Fusiliers, Royal Welsh and The Royal Highland Fusiliers, 2nd Battalion, The Royal Regiment of Scotland
- "Guardsman" in the Grenadier Guards, Coldstream Guards, Scots Guards, Irish Guards, Welsh Guards and the London Guards
- "Gunner" in the Royal Artillery and Royal Horse Artillery
- "Highlander" in The Highlanders, 4th Battalion, The Royal Regiment of Scotland
- "Kingsman" in the Duke of Lancaster's Regiment
- "Ranger" in the Royal Irish Regiment, London Irish Rifles and the Ranger Regiment
- "Rifleman" in The Rifles and the Royal Gurkha Rifles
- "Sapper" in the Royal Engineers
- "Signaller" in the Royal Signals
- "Trooper" in many regiments with a cavalry tradition and in the Special Air Service

=== Foot Guards ===
Rank insignia of the other ranks of the foot guards
Rank group	Warrant officers				Senior NCOs			Junior NCOs		Soldiers	
NATO code	OR-9		OR-8		OR-7	OR-6	OR-5	OR-4	OR-3	OR-2	OR-1
Full dress insignia										No insignia	
Service dress insignia										No insignia	
Typical appointment	Garrison sergeant major London district	Regimental sergeant major	Regimental quartermaster sergeant	Company sergeant major	Company quartermaster sergeant			Lance sergeant			
Rank	Warrant officer class 1		Warrant officer class 2		Colour sergeant (Note: In full dress, the colour badge consists of the king's colour of the respective regiment above two crossed swords and below the imperial crown, all imposed over a gold three-bar chevron. In service dress, the insignia is the same as that worn in the rest of the British Army.)	Sergeant		Corporal (Note: Corporals in the foot guards are automatically appointed lance sergeant and wear a three-bar chevron. In full dress, a lance sergeant's chevrons are white, whilst a substantive sergeant's chevrons are gold. In service dress, lance sergeants and sergeants wear a three-bar chevron of the same colours. However, full sergeants also wear a red sash across their right shoulder. Additionally, the cap badge of a sergeant may differ from that of a lance sergeant. Lance sergeants are allowed privileges normally reserved for sergeants in the British Army.)	Lance corporal (Note: Lance corporals in the foot guards wear a two-bar chevron instead of a one-bar chevron)	Guardsman	
Abbreviation	WO1		WO2		CSgt	Sgt		LSgt	LCpl	Gdsm	

The five regiments of foot guards (Grenadier, Coldstream, Scots, Irish and Welsh) have a unique rank structure to the rest of the British Army. Lance corporals in the foot guards wear two chevrons, as opposed to one. The change from one-bar to two-bar chevrons happened sometime between 1882 and 1887, and whilst some sources claim that this was according to a preference expressed by Queen Victoria, those claims are unproven. The appointment of lance sergeant, abolished in the rest of the army in 1946, was retained in the foot guards, and all corporals are made lance sergeants upon their promotion to corporal. In full dress, substantive sergeants wear a crimson sash and gold lace chevrons whilst lance sergeants wear no sash and white worsted chevrons like corporals. In no. 2 service dress, the chevron colours are the same for both ranks but lance sergeants do not wear the sash or cap badge of a substantive sergeant.

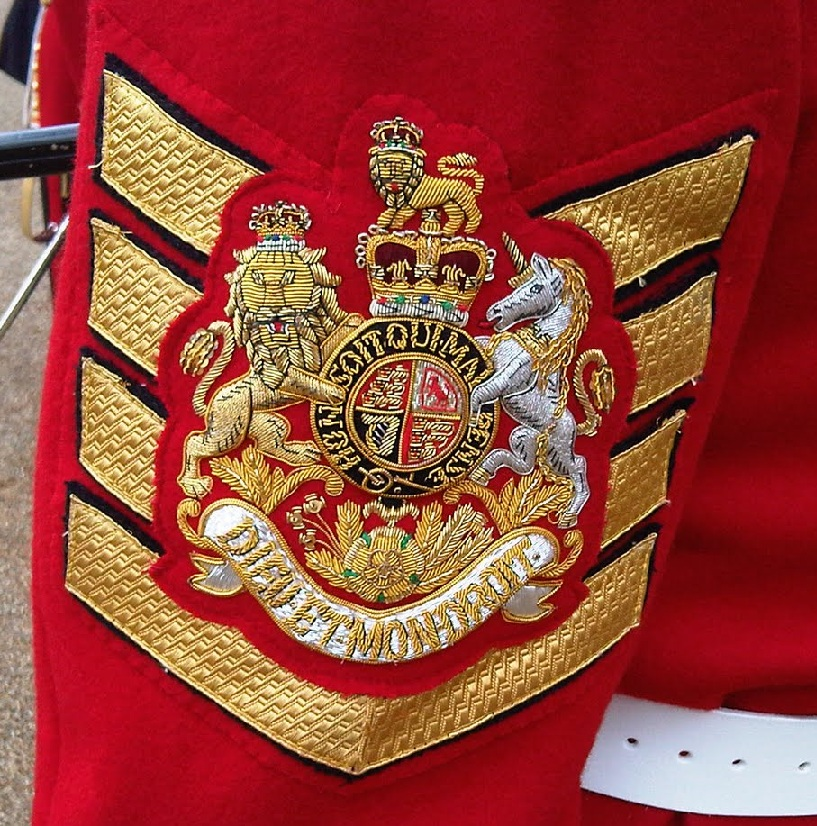
The Garrison Sergeant Major London District's badge of rank

Colour sergeants in the foot guards also wear a unique badge of rank on full dress, consisting of a crown above a depiction of the king's colour (which is crimson in the foot guards, unlike the regiments in the rest of the British Army which have a defaced Union Flag as their king's colour) and above two crossed swords, all superimposed on three gold lace chevrons. The badge is also used, minus the chevrons, by company sergeant majors. The design of the crimson flag varies between the five regiments. The Grenadier Guards use a royal cypher, reversed and interlaced, with the flowers of the four nations of the United Kingdom in the corners. The flag's tassels and the crossed swords beneath the flag also differ in design from those used in the other regiments. The Coldstream Guards use a Garter star above a sphinx that is encircled by a wreath; the Scots Guards use the same design but with the star of the Order of the Thistle; the Irish Guards use the star of the Order of St Patrick with shamrocks in each corner; and the Welsh Guards use a dragon above their motto, Cymru am byth, 'Wales forever'.

In full dress, foot guards' chevrons are of double lace (abolished in the rest of the army in 1868) and are edged in dark blue, the facing colour of royal regiments. In no. 2 service dress, NCOs' chevrons and badges are brown on khaki (as opposed to white on khaki as in most regiments) and the crowns on the badges of warrant officers and NCOs are metal, except in the Grenadier Guards who wear all cloth insignia. NCOs in the Grenadier Guards also wear a grenade above their chevrons on no. 2 service dress, and Grenadier Guards colour sergeants and WO2s wear crossed swords above a grenade with their no. 2 service dress rank insignia. The Honourable Artillery Company has worn rank insignia and dress based on that of the Grenadier Guards since ordered by William IV in 1830, but they do not use the rank of guardsman.

=== Household Cavalry ===
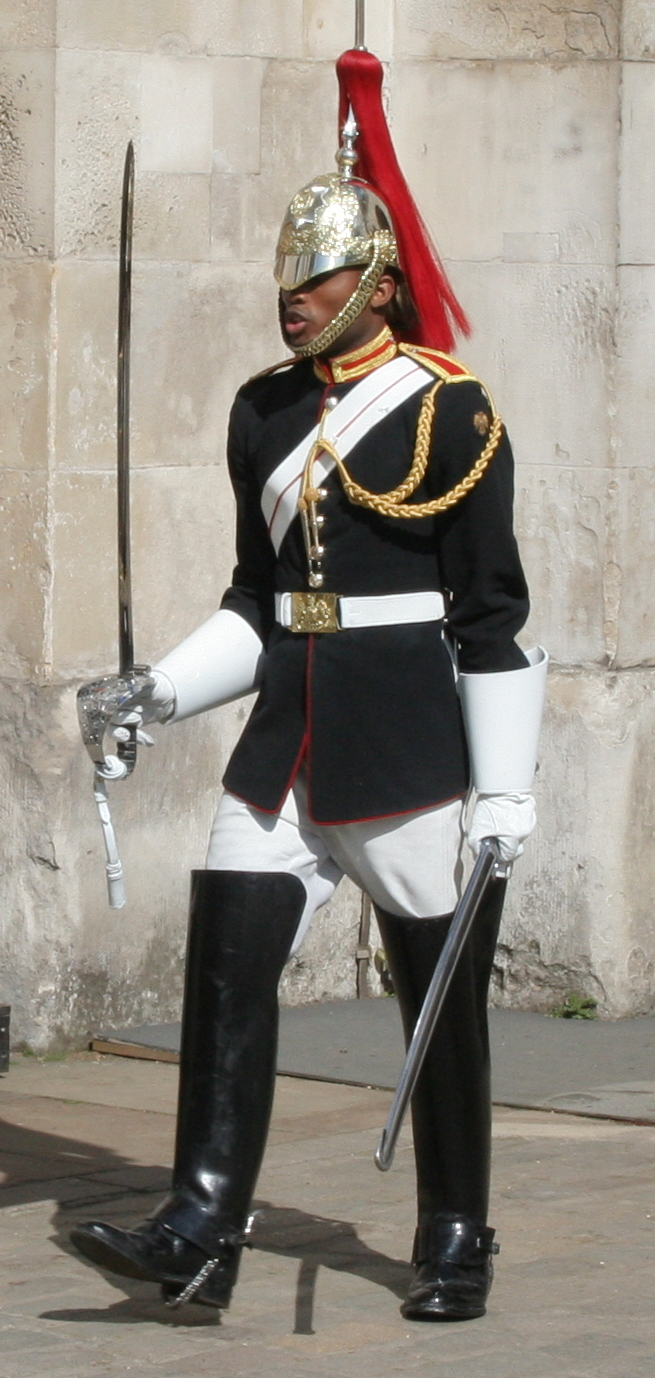
A lance corporal of the Blues and Royals in full dress, distinguished by basic aiguillettes and no shoulder cords

Rank insignia of the other ranks of the Household Cavalry
Rank group	Warrant officers			Senior NCOs			Junior NCOs		Soldiers	
NATO code	OR-9	OR-8		OR-7	OR-6	OR-5	OR-4	OR-3	OR-2	OR-1
Full dress insignia	Shoulder cords and aiguillettes, 1st class staff	Shoulder cords and aiguillettes, 1st class staff		Shoulder cords and aiguillettes, 2nd class staff				Aiguillettes only	No insignia	
Service dress insignia									No insignia	
Typical appointment	Regimental corporal major	Regimental quartermaster corporal	Squadron corporal major (Note: Farrier corporal majors also wear a gold embroidered horse shoe below a crown, each on a scarlet cloth background, and worn on the right forearm when wearing full dress, and a brass horse shoe below a crown and wreath on the right forearm when wearing no. 2 service dress. In full dress, WO2 trumpet majors wear shoulder cords and aiguillettes, 1st class staff, and gold embroidered crossed trumpets below a large gold embroidered crown, each on a cloth background of the regimental facing colour, and worn on the right forearm. On no. 2 service dress, WO2 trumpet majors wear a large crown above brass crossed trumpets above a four-bar chevron on the right forearm.)	Squadron quartermaster corporal (Note: Farrier staff corporals also wear a gold embroidered horse shoe on a scarlet cloth background on the right upper arm when wearing full dress, and a brass horse shoe between the chevrons and crown on the right forearm when wearing no. 2 service dress. In full dress, staff corporal trumpet majors wear the same dress as a WO2 trumpet major: shoulder cords and aiguillettes, 1st class staff, and gold embroidered crossed trumpets below a large gold embroidered crown, each on a cloth background of the regimental facing colour, and worn on the right forearm. On no. 2 service dress, WO2 trumpet majors wear a small crown above brass crossed trumpets above a four-bar chevron on the right forearm.)			Lance corporal of horse (Note: Farrier lance corporals of horse also wear a gold embroidered horse shoe on a scarlet cloth background on the right upper arm when wearing full dress, and a brass horse shoe between the chevrons and crown on the right upper arm when wearing no. 2 service dress.)			
Rank	Warrant officer class 1	Warrant officer class 2		Staff corporal (Note: Equivalent to a staff/colour sergeant)	Corporal of horse (Note: Equivalent to a sergeant. Farrier corporals of horse also wear a gold embroidered horse shoe on a scarlet cloth background on the right upper arm when wearing full dress, and a brass horse shoe between the chevrons and crown on the right upper arm when wearing no. 2 service dress.)		Corporal (Note: Corporals in the Household Cavalry are automatically appointed lance corporal of horse and wear a cloth crown above a three-bar chevron. Lance corporals of horse are allowed privileges normally reserved for sergeants in the British Army.)	Lance corporal (Note: Lance corporals in the Household Cavalry wear a two-bar chevron below a metal crown instead of a one-bar chevron. Farrier lance corporals also wear a gold embroidered horse shoe on a scarlet cloth background on the right upper arm when wearing full dress, and a brass horse shoe between the chevrons and crown on the right upper arm when wearing no. 2 service dress.)	Trooper	
Abbreviation	WO1	WO2		SCpl	CoH		LCoH	LCpl	Tpr	

The Household Cavalry maintains the old cavalry tradition of having no rank of sergeant, which was originally an infantry rank only. It has its own peculiar set of insignia and ranks.

Similarly, warrant officer appointments are different, with, for example, "regimental corporal major" being used in place of regimental sergeant major. Uniquely, NCOs and warrant officers of the Household Cavalry do not wear any insignia on their full dress uniforms (although officers do). Rank is indicated by a system of aiguillettes.

=== Army Air Corps ===
Other rank pilots in the Army Air Corps are initially appointed to the rank of Aviation Warrant Officer One (AW1) and can subsequently progress up to Aviation Warrant Officer Four (AW4)

=== Others ===
In several cavalry regiments, including the 1st The Queen's Dragoon Guards and the Queen's Royal Hussars, NCOs holding the rank of lance corporal wear two chevrons instead of one. Full corporals are distinguished by the addition of a cypher above their two stripes in dress uniforms. Staff sergeants in an appointment as squadron quartermaster sergeant in the cavalry sometimes wear four stripes with a crown and are referred to as "sergeant major". The term "mister" is confined to WO2s.

The Royal Artillery and Royal Horse Artillery also use the ranks lance bombardier and bombardier instead of lance corporal and corporal, while The Rifles use the spelling "serjeant" in place of "sergeant".

== History ==
=== 17th century–1802 ===
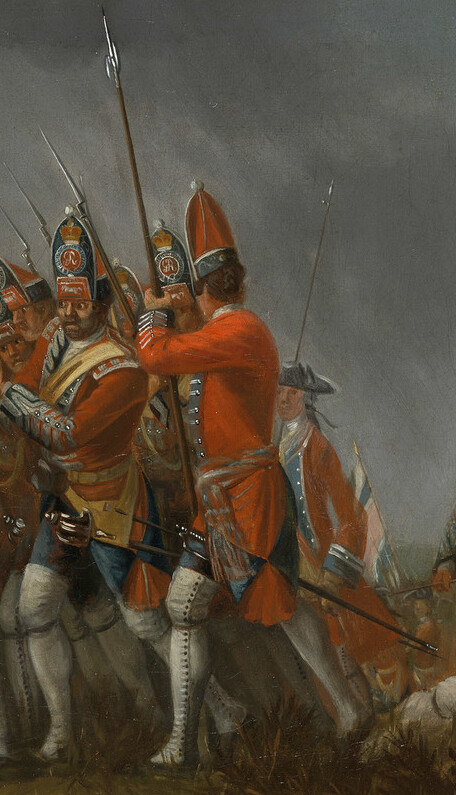
A sergeant of a grenadier company of the 4th Regiment of Foot at the Battle of Culloden in 1746

Until the introduction of sergeant majors early in the eighteenth century, the only NCOs were sergeants and corporals. In the second half of the 17th century sergeants and corporals were distinguished by wearing coats laced with silver of various widths and silver bands and edging on their hats, whilst officers wore gorgets, sashes and other ornamentation. NCOs were also distinguishable by their weaponry. Sergeants carried halberts, corporals generally carried muskets, and those in the foot guards carried poleaxes. Drum majors had the standing of a sergeant but only counted as a drummer in the establishment. Drum majors, drummers and hoboys were also marked out by special uniforms. It is probable that the earliest distinctions of NCO rank were left to the discretion of commanding officers. Although the royal warrant of 1707 established a Board of General Officers to regulate clothing and equipment, a subsequent clothing warrant of 1708 directed that 'the Serjeants, Corporals, Drummers, Trumpeters, and Hoboys be clothed in the same manner as the soldiers, but everything to be better in its kind.'

George II made efforts to standardise dress in the army, and a series of books, orders and clothing warrants were issued to this effect during his reign. In contrast to NCOs, soldiers did not wear any particular insignia of rank. Instead, infantry soldiers wore red coats and white lace with coloured lines or geometric patterns known as 'regimental lace'. The pattern of the lace and the colour of the facings of the coat served to distinguish the different regiments. Infantry sergeants wore a worsted sash around the waist, usually red with a stripe of the colour of their regimental facings (in contrast to the crimson silk sashes worn over the right shoulder by infantry officers). Corporals wore a white worsted shoulder knot on the right shoulder. Sergeants' coats were of scarlet cloth, whilst corporals and soldiers wore red and drum majors wore distinguishing coats. In 1752 infantry sergeants were ordered to wear coats with lapels worn to the waist of the same colour as the facings of their regiment, and with white or yellow buttons and buttonholes (to match their officers who wore silver or gold buttons and buttonholes). In 1761 a standing order is noted under which sergeant majors and drum majors (but not sergeants) were allowed to wear gold or silver lace on their coats.

In 1768 during the reign of George III, a detailed clothing warrant for the infantry was published. A sergeant's buttonholes were looped with white braid and their hat laced with silver. Sergeants were to carry a halbert (in contrast to battalion officers who carried an espontoon). (Note: Sergeants in a grenadier company were to have a fusil (a light flintlock musket), pouch and a cap, whilst sergeants in the fusiliers were to have a sword.) The coat for corporals and soldiers had buttonholes looped with regimental lace, (Note: The regimental lace patterns and facing colours were also recorded in 1768.) and the corporal's shoulder knot had been replaced by a silk epaulette, still worn on the right shoulder only. Corporals and privates' hats had a white tape binding. Sergeant majors and drum majors were not mentioned, although paintings of the 25th Foot from 1771 show a sergeant major wearing a scarlet coat with yellow facings and extensively laced with silver and other decorative details. The drum major is shown wearing a similar coat but the colours of the body and facings are exchanged. Separate records from 1768 show that NCOs in the 3rd guards were to wear epaulettes.

Towards the end of the 18th century all NCOs in line infantry regiments wore epaulettes on their shoulders, with the first evidence appearing in 1779. An infantry sergeant major wore a silver epaulette with a bullion fringe on each shoulder, a sergeant wore a silk epaulette with a fringe on each shoulder, and a corporal wore a plain silk epaulette with a fringe on the right shoulder only (and on the red jacket of an ordinary soldier). NCOs in flank companies and the fusiliers wore their epaulettes on both arms above their wings. NCOs in the 3rd Guards had worn epaulettes since 1768 and this was evident in all three regiments of foot guards by 1792. In the foot guards, a sergeant major wore a gold epaulette with a bullion fringe on each shoulder; a sergeant wore a gold-laced epaulette with a gilt fringe on the right shoulder and a laced strap with a gilt fringe on the left shoulder; and a corporal wore a laced strap with gilt fringe on the right shoulder only. In common with the flank companies of the line infantry regiments, these were worn on both arms above the wings in the flank companies of the foot guards. There was considerable variation in the patterns and styles of epaulettes between regiments. In the cavalry, a corporal of horse (the cavalry equivalent to the infantry rank of sergeant) was distinguished by silver or guilt lace to their uniform, and a corporal by similar lace but only to the cuffs and collars.

In the last quarter of the 18th century, chevrons are recorded as being used to indicate NCO ranks in some regiments. In 1795 a standing order for the 43rd Foot instructed lance sergeants to wear two chevrons of white worsted lace and lance corporals to wear one. Regulations for the newly established Rifle Corps in 1800 record that substantive NCOs wore some form of chevron, described as a "customary 'V' or arrow", whilst a chosen man was to wear a ring of white cloth around the right arm. There is also evidence of cavalry regiment NCOs wearing chevrons on the right arm during this period. A cavalry sergeant major wore a three-bar chevron; a sergeant, farrier major or trumpet major wore two; and a corporal wore one.

=== 1802–1881 ===
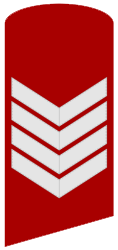
Sergeant major

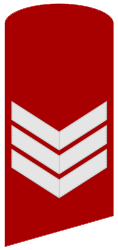
Sergeant

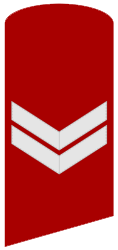
Corporal

1802 rank insignia

The need to easily recognise NCOs in battle and the growth in the number of ranks over the course of the previous century, each requiring a costly uniform reflecting their rank, led to the creation of a simplified system of cheaply made and easily recognised rank marks for the infantry. In 1802 epaulettes and shoulder knots for NCOs were replaced by chevrons, with only officers to wear epaulettes. The chevrons were to point down and were to be placed on the right arm, half way between the elbow and the shoulder. They were to be formed of double row lace and edged with the facing colour of the regiment. Sergeant majors were to wear a four-bar chevron of silver, gilt or white lace; quartermasters a four-bar white chevron; and sergeants a three-bar white chevron. Corporals wore a two-bar chevron made of the regimental lace, and chosen men wore a one-bar chevron of regimental lace. The foot guards wore gilt chevrons. Sergeants were to continue wearing a crimson worsted sash with a central stripe in the facing colours appropriate to their regiment.

The cavalry of the line used the same rank system as the infantry but with a warrant rank troop quartermaster instead of the infantry rank of quartermaster sergeant, and with trumpeters in place of drummers. The standardised chevron system of 1802 was not extended to the cavalry until 1803, and in 1809 the cavalry rank of troop quartermaster was replaced by the rank of troop sergeant major (coinciding with the introduction of the commissioned rank of quartermaster into the cavalry). Troop sergeant majors were to adopt a four-bar chevron, hitherto worn by a regimental sergeant major. The latter were to wear a crown above their four-bar chevrons in order to differentiate themselves from the new rank. Evidence shows that sergeant majors in the infantry had also begun to add a crown above their four-bar chevrons in the years before the Crimean War, although this may have been unofficial until 1865.

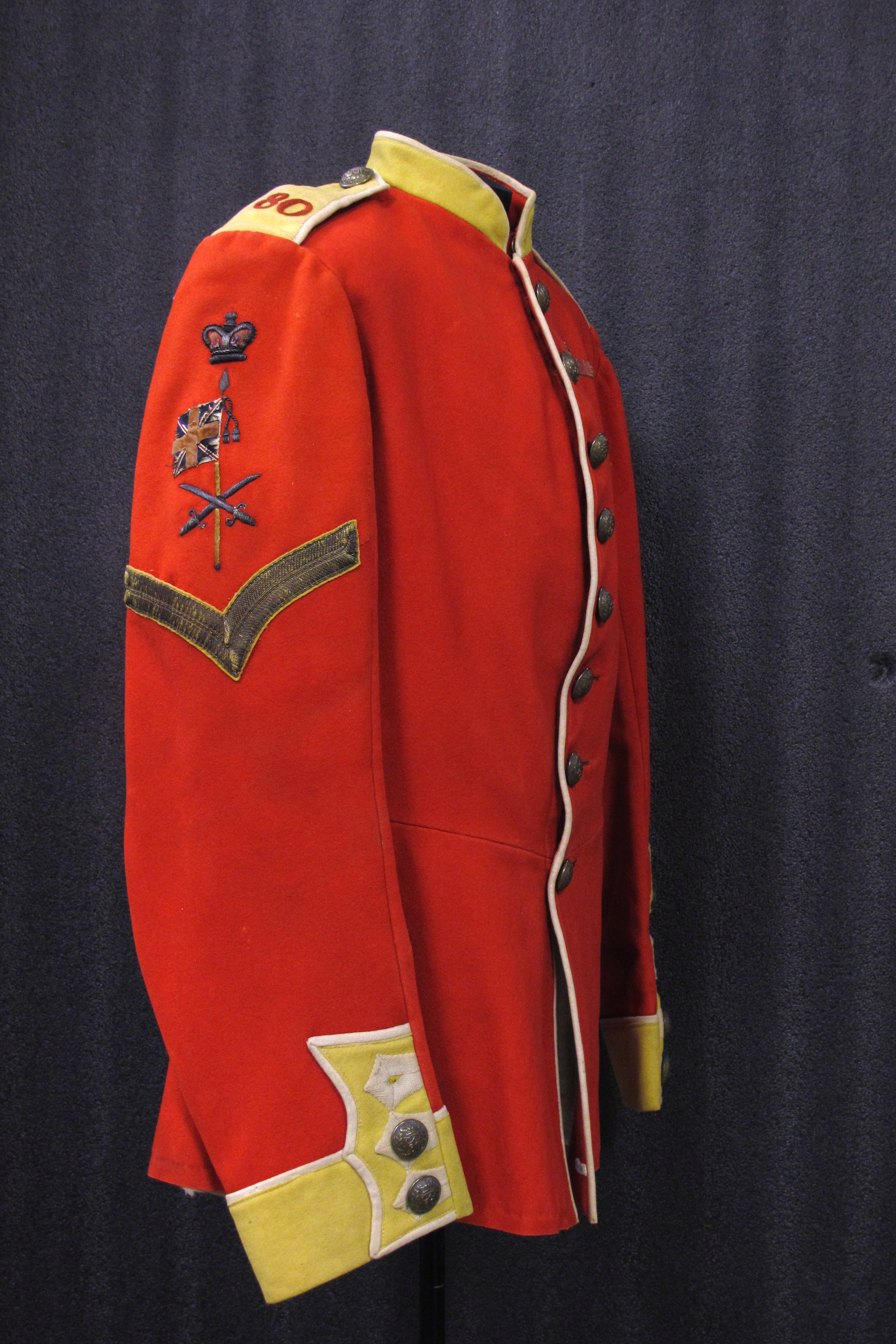
The rank insignia of a colour sergeant in the 80th Foot, c. 1860

In 1813 the rank of colour sergeant was created for the senior sergeant in each infantry company; the equivalent of the troop sergeant major in cavalry regiments. In line regiments, colour sergeants wore a single chevron below two crossed swords below a Union Flag flying to the rear and all surmounted by a crown. (Note: The original order specified that the flag should be the regimental colour and implied a three-bar chevron, but a drawing which followed the order showed a single white double lace chevron below a Union Flag, which is the basic design of the king's colour rather than the regimental colour.) Colour sergeants in the rifle regiments and the foot guards wore a slightly different design and some regiments wore three chevrons below the colour instead of one. Colour sergeants in flank companies, fusiliers, highlanders and light infantry also wore three chevrons on the left sleeve, in addition to the colour badge on their right sleeve.

The coloured regimental lace worn by corporals and below was abolished in 1836, and thereafter their chevrons were of the same plain white lace as the chevrons of senior NCOs. Regulations issued in 1837 repeated the ranks and chevrons given in 1802 but also include the single chevron for a lance corporal. Stripes on the sashes of sergeants were discontinued in 1845, leaving a plain all-crimson woollen sash worn around the waist. But when officers began to wear their sashes over the left shoulder in 1855, NCOs followed but over the right shoulder to avoid confusion.

Four classes of schoolmaster were created in 1854 with the insignia of stars. The first class ranked as warrant officers and were senior to the sergeant-major; the second and third classes ranked as staff sergeants, below a sergeant major; and the fourth class was made up of assistant schoolmasters with the rank of sergeant. They wore a blue frock coat and gold shoulder knots, a sword and crimson sash, and a cap with a scarlet band and a crown in gold thread. The first, second and third classes wore three, two and one gold stars respectively on their collars, and the fourth class ranking as a sergeant wore neither the collar star, shoulder knots, nor crown on their cap, and wore a silk girdle rather than a sash. However, these ranks and their insignia were short-lived, as in 1863 the four classes were reduced to the two categories of superintending schoolmaster (with the commissioned officer rank of ensign) and schoolmaster (with the rank of staff sergeant and the accompanying chevrons).

Troop quartermaster sergeants were introduced to the cavalry of the line in 1856 with the insignia of a four-bar chevron. At this point troop sergeant majors, who had hitherto worn the four bar-chevron, adopted a three-bar chevron below a crown. Following the reforms to army dress in 1855 there is evidence that NCOs of colour sergeant rank and above wore gold chevrons, and this is confirmed to be the case by 1865 (except in the rifle regiments). The ranks of sergeant and below continued to wear white chevrons until 1868 when substantive sergeants too were to wear single lace gold chevrons. Corporals and below continued to wear white chevrons. The effect of this order also seems to have been to replace double lace chevrons with single lace chevrons for all ranks of NCO, except in the foot guards. Also in 1868 a new badge for colour sergeants was introduced to replace the 1813 design. This had a crown above two crossed Union Flags above three gold chevrons. In 1869 sergeant majors and quartermaster sergeants were instructed to wear their four-bar chevrons below the elbow instead of above. In 1871 the dull red tunics worn by corporals and soldiers were replaced by scarlet coloured tunics, as worn by sergeants and officers.

Prior to 1861, Queen's Regulations categorised the other ranks as staff sergeants, sergeants, drummers, corporals and privates. In 1861 the category of staff sergeant was separated into two classes: first and second. However, these categories did not replace ranks. In 1879 the historic title of conductor, which had fallen into disuse early in the 19th century, was recreated with the positions of conductor of supplies (in the Commissariat and Transport Corps) and conductor of stores (in the Ordnance Store Corps) at the recreated rank of warrant officer. They did not have a badge of rank but wore a different uniform to other ranks.

=== 1881–1915 ===
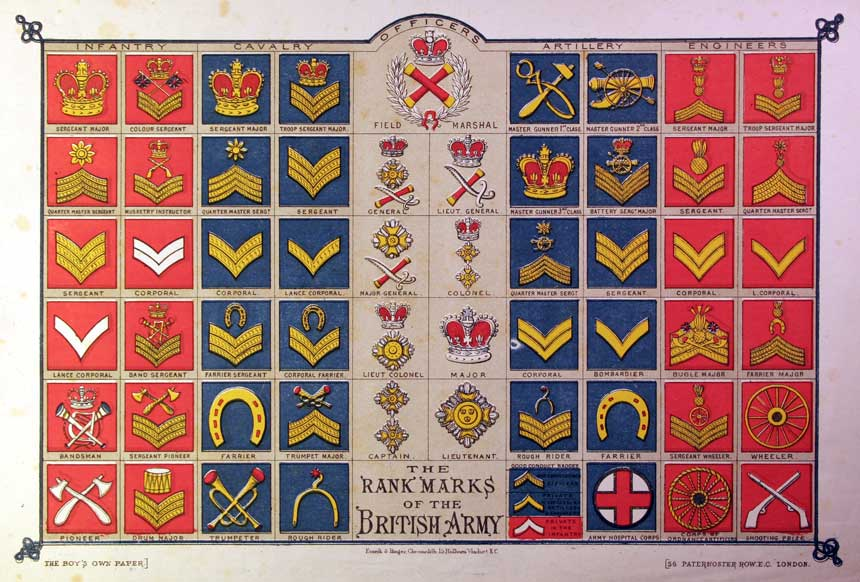
Badges of rank published in an 1883 boys' magazine. Appointments varied by branch (cavalry, artillery, engineers and infantry) but shared common ranks and insignia.

The 1881 Childers Reforms reorganised the regiments and battalions of the British Army. 1881 also saw a series of regulations and amendments which sought to standardise and simplify the badges of rank for both officers and other ranks which had grown in complexity since they were introduced in 1802. In 1881 the other ranks consisted of warrant officers; staff sergeants, 1st class; staff sergeants, 2nd class; sergeants; corporals (including the appointment of lance sergeant); bombardiers (in the artillery) and 2nd corporals; privates of various titles (including the appointments of lance corporal and acting bombardier); and boys. However, although there were only eight categories of rank, there remained a wide range of ranks and appointments. The way in which badges were worn was also standardised. Badges of rank were to be worn only on the right arm, with four-bar chevrons to point up with the point below the elbow, and one, two and three bar chevrons to point down with the point above the elbow. All badges and chevrons were to be of gold lace, except for some rank badges in the line infantry, the Army Hospital Corps and the rifle regiments. Rifle regiment NCOs wore worsted and silk badges and chevrons, whilst other line infantry NCOs wore gold for the ranks above sergeant and white for those ranks below colour sergeant.

Initially, the only warrant officers were conductors of supplies (in the Commissariat and Transport Corps) and conductors of stores (in the Ordnance Store Corps). They did not have a badge of rank but wore a different uniform to other ranks. (Note: Initially, conductors of supplies (Commissariat and Transport Corps) and conductors of stores (Ordnance Store Corps) wore a different uniform to other ranks, rather than a rank badge. The Commissariat and Transport Corps was re-titled the Army Service Corps in 1889, and the appointments were renamed conductor A.S.C. and conductor O.S.C. In 1892 the appointment of conductor A.S.C. was replaced by staff serjeant-major, 1st class, whilst in 1896 the conductor O.S.C. became conductor A.O.C. when the corps was renamed as the Army Ordnance Corps. The appointment of staff sergeant major, 1st class, was discontinued in 1965 when the Royal Army Service Corps was disbanded, whilst the rank of conductor continues in the successor to the Royal Army Ordnance Corps, the Royal Logistics Corps.) The lesser rank of regimental sergeant major initially wore a four-bar chevron pointing up beneath a crown. However, reforms later in 1881 raised several ranks of the staff sergeant, 1st class, category to warrant officer rank, including master gunners, 1st and 2nd class, regimental sergeant majors, bandmasters and several technical NCOs. In 1882 their badge of rank was changed to a large crown in the style of St Edward's Crown. Master gunners also wore a gun below the crown, and bandmasters (except the Royal Artillery bandmaster who had a special badge) wore gold engineer knots instead of the crown.

Regimental quartermaster sergeants remained at the rank of staff sergeant, 1st class, and their badge of rank was four chevrons pointing upwards topped by an eight-pointed star. Staff sergeants, 2nd class, included troop sergeant majors (in cavalry troops); battery sergeant majors and battery quartermaster sergeants (in the artillery); company sergeant majors (in the engineers); and colour sergeants (in the infantry). Their badge of rank was three downward pointing chevrons below a crown. Around the same time, trumpet majors, drum majors, bugle majors and pipe majors were reduced from staff sergeant, 2nd class, to sergeant rank, and their titles accordingly changed to sergeant trumpeter, sergeant drummer, sergeant bugler and sergeant piper. Their titles would not be restored to the -major style until 1928. Sergeants/lance sergeants, corporals, and 2nd corporals/bombardiers/lance corporals continued to wear a three-bar, two-bar and one-bar chevron respectively. Privates (and their equivalents) and boys continued to wear no badges of rank.

In 1887 warrant officer bandmasters adopted a lyre below a crown as their badge of rank, and troop sergeant majors in the cavalry were redesignated as squadron sergeant majors in the 1890s. In 1901 staff sergeant majors, 1st class, ASC and conductors AOC (successors to the conductors of supplies/stores, formerly without a badge of rank) began to wear a crown in a wreath as their rank insignia. Staff sergeant majors, 1st class, in the Army Pay Corps followed in 1904, whilst sub-conductors in the Army Ordnance Corps took the crown as their badge of rank. (Note: Both the Commissariat and Transport Corps and Ordnance Store Corps (and their successor corps) had staff sergeants, 1st class, who were assistants to the conductors. They were promoted to warrant officers with the title of staff sergeant major in 1889 (not to be confused with staff sergeant majors, 1st class). In 1896 staff sergeant majors in the Army Ordnance Corps were retitled sub-conductors.) With the accession of Edward VII in 1901, he selected a Tudor Crown design to replace all other crown designs in use, and in 1902 khaki service dress was adopted, with badges of rank to be worn on both arms on service dress from 1904. By 1907, both brass and worsted badges of rank were being worn on service dress. Army order 323 of October 1913 reorganised infantry battalions from eight companies to four, leaving two colour sergeants in each new company. In 1914, the senior of the pair was appointed to the new infantry position of company sergeant major and the junior to that of company quartermaster sergeant.

=== 1915–present ===
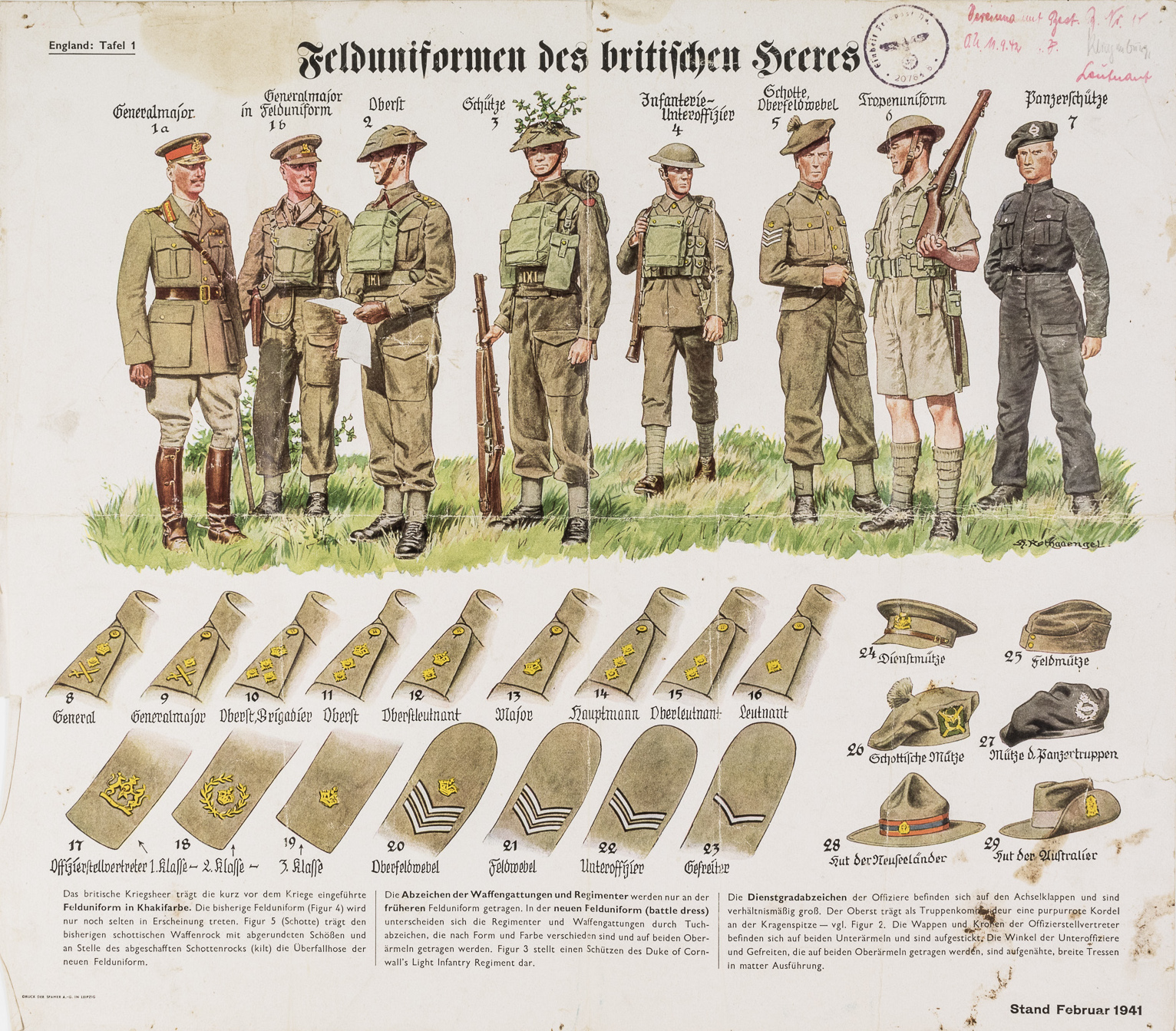
A German chart issued in 1941 showing both commissioned and non-commissioned officer ranks

The next major reforms after 1881 took place in 1915. Warrant officers were divided into two classes: class I and II (styled in roman numerals until the second half of the twentieth century), and many more NCOs were promoted to warrant officer rank. Staff sergeants, 1st class, in the position of regimental quartermaster sergeant, and staff sergeants, 2nd class, in the position of squadron/battery/troop/company sergeant major, were promoted to warrant officer class II. Under army order 174 of 1915, their badge of rank became the imperial crown as worn by regimental sergeant majors up to this point. Regimental sergeant majors (and equivalents) were made warrant officers class I and were ordered to wear the royal arms as their badge of rank. Conductors, AOC, and staff sergeant majors, 1st class, ASC and APC, along with master gunners, 1st class, and schoolmasters, 1st class, were also made WOI and continued to wear a crown in a wreath. In all cases, the badge was worn below the elbow. By the end of the First World War, all staff sergeants, 1st class, had been promoted to the WOII rank, thus ending that class of rank. Squadron/battery/troop/company quartermaster sergeants remained at the staff/colour sergeant rank, formerly staff sergeant, 2nd class.

There were further changes to the badges of warrant officers in both classes under army order 309 of 1918. Those warrant officers, class I, using the crown in a wreath were ordered to adopt the royal arms in a wreath. WOII quartermasters (which had formerly been of a higher rank than company level sergeant majors before the 1915 reforms) adopted the crown in a wreath, whilst WOII squadron/battery/troop/company sergeant majors retained the crown as their badge.

In 1920 the ranks of bombardier and 2nd corporal were abolished, and corporals in the Royal Artillery were restyled as bombardiers. The rank of 2nd corporal was replaced by the appointments of lance corporal and lance bombardier. In 1928 sergeant trumpeters, sergeant drummers, sergeant buglers and sergeant pipers were restored to their pre-1881 titles of trumpet majors, drum majors, bugle majors and pipe majors.

A short lived reform was introduced in 1938 when a third class of warrant officer was introduced. The role of platoon/troop commander, normally filled by a lieutenant or second lieutenant, was made available for experienced NCOs in the new appointment of platoon/troop sergeant major with the rank of warrant officer class III. Their badge of rank was an imperial crown, whilst those warrant officers, class II, who had formerly worn the crown were ordered to wear the crown in a wreath, the same badge worn by WOII quartermaster sergeants. The rank of WOIII was placed in suspension in 1940, and in 1947 WOII ranks were ordered to return to their pre-1938 badges of rank.

Following the accession of Elizabeth II in 1952, the Tudor Crown design used on rank badges was replaced by a St Edward's Crown design in 1953. It returned to a Tudor Crown design with the accession of Charles III in 2022 and was rolled out on British Army uniforms from 2023.

The grades of lance sergeant and lance corporal were not ranks but appointments, held by selected corporals and privates, and usually carrying extra pay. The appointment was made by the man's commanding officer and could be taken away by him for disciplinary reasons, unlike full sergeants and corporals who could only be demoted by order of a court martial. In 1961 the ranks of lance corporal and lance bombardier were made substantive ranks rather than appointments, whilst the appointment of lance sergeant was discontinued in 1946, except in the Foot Guards and Honourable Artillery Company (and its equivalent, lance corporal of horse, in the Household Cavalry).

The regimental sergeant major for the Royal Military Academy Sandhurst was retitled academy sergeant major (AcSM) in 1960 and made one of the most senior warrant officer appointments, with the badge of the royal arms in a laurel wreath. The appointment of Royal Artillery sergeant major was established in 1989, senior to other master gunners, and their badge of appointment is the royal arms above a gun and within a laurel wreath. In 2011 the badge of appointment for the garrison sergeant major London district changed from the royal arms to the royal arms on a four-bar chevron, as it had been before 1882. The appointment of army sergeant major was made in 2015, with the royal arms in a large oakleaf wreath as their insignia.

=== Spelling ===
The spelling serjeant is sometimes seen. This was the official spelling in the British Army and Royal Marines, although not the Royal Air Force, until the 1930s and appeared in such publications as King's Regulations and the Pay Warrant, which defined the various ranks. In common usage, the modern spelling sergeant was already more usual, as in the volumes of the Official History which began to appear in the 1920s. Serjeant-at-Arms is a title still held by members of the security staff in the Houses of Parliament. The old spelling is also retained by The Rifles, as successor to the Royal Green Jackets and The Light Infantry, which also used it.

=== Historical ranks ===
- Sergeant-major: equivalent to the current regimental sergeant major, a warrant officer class 1
- Company sergeant-major: now an appointment of warrant officer class 2
- Quartermaster sergeant: can now be a regimental quartermaster sergeant (warrant officer class 2) or a company quartermaster sergeant (staff sergeant). In the technical corps, a WO2 can also be an AQMS (Artificer Quartermaster Sergeant), TQMS (Technical .....), or SQMS (Squadron ... )
- Warrant officer class III: a short-lived rank used between 1938 and 1940, holding the appointment of platoon sergeant major, troop sergeant major, or section sergeant major.
- Colour sergeant: gave way to staff sergeant over the years before the First World War although colour sergeant exists today in the Royal Marines, equivalent to a staff sergeant in the Army, and is still used to refer to all staff sergeants in infantry regiments and the Honourable Artillery Company.
- Lance sergeant: appointment originally given to corporals acting in the rank of sergeant, discontinued in 1946 except in the Foot Guards, Honourable Artillery Company, and some cadet units.
- Second corporal: Royal Engineers and Army Ordnance Corps rank until 1920, equivalent to lance-corporal but a substantive instead of an acting rank.
- Bombardier: until 1920, when it became equivalent to corporal, a rank in the Royal Artillery equivalent to a second corporal.
- Acting bombardier: appointment originally given to a Royal Artillery gunner acting in the rank of bombardier, discontinued in 1918 and replaced by lance-bombardier.
- Chosen man: was a rank primarily found in the Rifle Brigade denoting a marksman and/or leadership material. Became lance corporal in the early 19th century.

== Timeline of changes ==
Rank group	Warrant officers				Senior NCOs						Junior NCOs			Soldiers	
1802–1809	No insignia													No insignia	
1802–1809	Troop quartermaster (Note: Cavalry only rank)				Serjeant-major		Quartermaster-serjeant (Note: Infantry only rank until 1856)		Serjeant		Lance serjeant	Corporal	Lance corporal	Private (or equivalent)	
1809–1813														No insignia	
1809–1813					Regimental serjeant-major	Serjeant major (Note: Unlike the cavalry and artillery (which had both regimental serjeant-majors and squadron/battery serjeant-majors), there was only one rank in each infantry battalion with the title 'serjeant-major' and no company serjeant-majors until 1914. Therefore, until 1914 this post was called simply 'serjeant-major' in the infantry rather than 'regimental serjeant-major'.)	Troop serjeant-major Quartermaster-serjeant		Serjeant		Lance serjeant	Corporal	Lance corporal	Private (or equivalent)	
1813–1836														No insignia	
1813–1836					Regimental serjeant-major	Serjeant-major	Troop serjeant-major Quartermaster-serjeant	Colour-serjeant	Serjeant		Lance serjeant	Corporal	Lance corporal	Private (or equivalent)	
1836–1856														No insignia	
1836–1856					Regimental serjeant-major	Serjeant-major	Troop serjeant-major Quartermaster-serjeant	Colour-serjeant	Serjeant		Lance serjeant	Corporal	Lance corporal	Private (or equivalent)	
1856–1868														No insignia	
1856–1868					Regimental serjeant-major	Regimental quartermaster-serjeant	Troop/battery serjeant-major Troop/battery quartermaster-serjeant	Colour-serjeant (Note: Colour-serjeants in the infantry only. The equivalent post in the cavalry, engineers and artillery branches was troop/battery serjeant-major. A colour-serjeant's insignia was used on full dress only. On other garments and on service dress introduced in 1902, a crown above 3 chevrons was used.)							
1856–1868					Staff-serjeant, 1st class		Staff-serjeant, 2nd class		Serjeant (Note: Until 1946, corporals could be appointed lance-sergeant, though this was an appointment rather than a substantive rank. The appointment continues in the foot guards and the Honourable Artillery Company.)		Lance serjeant	Corporal	2nd corporal/ bombardier/ lance corporal (Note: Until 1961, lance corporal was an appointment for privates (and equivalent ranks) rather than a substantive rank.)	Private (or equivalent)	Boy
1868–1871														No insignia	
1868–1871					Regimental serjeant-major	Regimental quartermaster-serjeant	Troop/battery serjeant-major Troop/battery quartermaster-serjeant	Colour-serjeant							
1868–1871					Staff-serjeant, 1st class		Staff-serjeant, 2nd class		Serjeant		Lance serjeant	Corporal	2nd corporal/ bombardier/ lance corporal	Private (or equivalent)	Boy
1871–1879														No insignia	
1871–1879					Regimental serjeant-major	Regimental quartermaster-serjeant	Troop/battery serjeant-major Troop/battery quartermaster-serjeant	Colour-serjeant							
1871–1879					Staff-serjeant, 1st class		Staff-serjeant, 2nd class		Serjeant		Lance serjeant	Corporal	2nd corporal/ bombardier/ lance corporal	Private (or equivalent)	Boy
1879–1881	No insignia													No insignia	
1879–1881	Conductor of supplies/stores				Regimental serjeant-major	Regimental quartermaster-serjeant	Troop/battery serjeant-major Troop/battery quartermaster-serjeant	Colour-serjeant							
1879–1881	Warrant officer				Staff-serjeant, 1st class		Staff-serjeant, 2nd class		Serjeant		Lance serjeant	Corporal	2nd corporal/ bombardier/ lance corporal	Private (or equivalent)	Boy
1881	No insignia													No insignia	
1881	Conductor of supplies/stores				Regimental serjeant-major	Regimental quartermaster-serjeant (Note: Also of this rank, the staff serjeants, 1st class, supporting the conductors of supplies/stores which were promoted to staff serjeant-majors (of warrant officer rank) in 1889. The staff serjeant-major O.S.C. was retitled 'sub-conductor A.O.C.' in 1896.)	Troop/battery serjeant-major (Note: Artillery NCOs wore a gun between the crown and chevrons, and engineers a grenade.); Troop/battery quartermaster-serjeant	Colour-serjeant							
1881	Warrant officer				Staff-serjeant, 1st class		Staff-serjeant, 2nd class (Note: Including the appointments of trumpet-major, drum-major, bugle-major and pipe major.)		Serjeant		Lance serjeant	Corporal	2nd corporal/ bombardier/ lance corporal	Private (or equivalent)	Boy
1881–1882	No insignia													No insignia	
1881–1882	Conductor of supplies/stores		Regimental serjeant-major		Regimental quartermaster-serjeant		Troop/battery serjeant-major Troop/battery quartermaster-serjeant	Colour-serjeant							
1881–1882	Warrant officer (Note: The warrant officer rank also included master gunners class 1 and 2, bandmasters, schoolmasters with over 12 years' service (later reduced to 8 years' service), and various technical NCOs.)				Staff-serjeant, 1st class		Staff-serjeant, 2nd class		Serjeant (Note: Until 1946, corporals could be appointed lance sergeant, though this was an appointment rather than a substantive rank. The appointment continues in the foot guards and the Honourable Artillery Company. In 1881 the posts of trumpet-major, drum-major, bugle-major and pipe-major were reduced from staff serjeant 2nd class to serjeant rank and renamed serjeant-trumpeter, serjeant-drummer, serjeant-bugler and serjeant-piper. Their '-major' titles were restored in 1928.)		Lance serjeant	Corporal	2nd corporal/ bombardier/ lance corporal	Private (or equivalent)	Boy
1882–1901	No insignia													No insignia	
1882–1901	Conductor of supplies/stores		Regimental serjeant-major		Regimental quartermaster-serjeant		Troop/battery serjeant-major Troop/battery quartermaster-serjeant	Colour-serjeant							
1882–1901	Warrant officer				Staff-serjeant, 1st class		Staff-serjeant, 2nd class		Serjeant		Lance serjeant	Corporal	2nd corporal/ bombardier/ lance corporal	Private (or equivalent)	Boy
1901–1902														No insignia	
1901–1902	Conductor A.O.C. Staff serjeant-major, 1st class		Regimental serjeant-major		Regimental quartermaster-serjeant		Squadron/battery/troop serjeant-major (Note: In the 1890s troop serjeant-major was redesignated squadron serjeant-major in cavalry regiments.); Squadron/battery/troop quartermaster-serjeant	Colour-serjeant							
1901–1902	Warrant officer				Staff-serjeant, 1st class		Staff-serjeant, 2nd class		Serjeant		Lance serjeant	Corporal	2nd corporal/ bombardier/ lance corporal	Private (or equivalent)	Boy
1902–1914														No insignia	
1902–1914	Conductor A.O.C. Staff serjeant-major, 1st class		Regimental serjeant-major		Regimental quartermaster-serjeant		Colour-serjeant; Squadron/battery/troop serjeant-major Squadron/battery/troop quartermaster-serjeant								
1902–1914	Warrant officer				Staff-serjeant, 1st class		Staff-serjeant, 2nd class		Serjeant		Lance serjeant	Corporal	2nd corporal/ bombardier/ lance corporal	Private (or equivalent)	Boy
1914–1915														No insignia	
1914–1915	Conductor A.O.C. Staff serjeant-major, 1st class		Regimental serjeant-major (Note: With the introduction of company serjeant-majors to the infantry in 1914, infantry battalions adopted the title 'regimental serjeant-major' for this post (rather than simply 'serjeant-major' as before), in line with the title already used by the cavalry and artillery. Although the post was at infantry battalion rather than regimental level, the title 'battalion serjeant-major' has never been used.)		Regimental quartermaster-serjeant		Squadron/battery/troop/company serjeant-major Squadron/battery/troop/company quartermaster-serjeant								
1914–1915	Warrant officer				Staff-serjeant, 1st class		Staff-serjeant, 2nd class		Serjeant		Lance serjeant	Corporal	2nd corporal/ bombardier/ lance corporal	Private (or equivalent)	Boy
1915–1918														No insignia	
1915–1918	Conductor A.O.C. (Note: Also the appointments of: Staff serjeant-major, 1st class, Army Service Corps and Army Pay Corps; Master gunner, 1st class (crown, wreath and gun); Schoolmaster, 1st class)	Regimental serjeant-major (Note: Also the appointments of: Sub-conductor, A.O.C.; Master gunner, 2nd class (royal arms and gun); Garrison serjeant-major; Schoolmaster; Regimental serjeant-major; Farrier-corporal-major (royal arms and horseshoe); Farrier-serjeant-major (royal arms and horseshoe); Serjeant-major R.A.M.C. (royal arms and Geneva cross); Serjeant-major, gymnastic staff (royal arms and crossed swords); Serjeant-major, School of Musketry (royal arms and crossed rifles))	Squadron/battery/troop/company serjeant-major Regimental quartermaster-serjeant (Note: Also the appointments of: Master gunner, 3rd class (crown and gun); Schoolmaster; Garrison quartermaster-serjeant; Quartermaster-corporal-major; Regimental quartermaster-serjeant (including crossed rifles for the School of Musketry and a Geneva cross for the R.A.M.C.); Squadron corporal-major; Squadron serjeant-major; Battery serjeant-major; Troop serjeant-major; Company serjeant-major)		Squadron/battery/troop/company quartermaster-serjeant										
1915–1918	Warrant officer class I (Note: Also the appointment of bandmaster which used a special badge, except in the Household Cavalry and foot guards.)		Warrant officer class II (Note: When the warrant officer rank was split into two classes in 1915, existing warrant officers became WOI while the majority of the staff serjeant class 1 and 2 rank (including company level serjeant-majors but not company level quartermaster-serjeants) were made WOII. By the end of the First World War, all staff serjeants 1st class had been promoted to the WOII rank.)		Staff/colour-serjeant				Serjeant		Lance serjeant	Corporal	2nd corporal/ bombardier/ lance corporal	Private (or equivalent)	
1918–1920														No insignia	
1918–1920	Conductor R.A.O.C. (Note: Also the appointments of: Staff serjeant-major, 1st class; Schoolmaster, 1st class; Master gunner, 1st class (royal arms, wreath and gun))	Regimental serjeant-major (Note: Also the appointments of: Master gunner, 2nd class (royal arms and gun); Armourer serjeant-major, fitter serjeant-major and armament serjeant-major (royal arms and crossed hammer and pincers); Saddler serjeant-major (royal arms and bit); Farrier corporal-major and farrier serjeant-major (royal arms and horse shoe); Wheeler serjeant-major (royal arms and wheel); Serjeant-major, R.A.M.C. (royal arms and Geneva cross); Serjeant-major, School of Musketry (royal arms and crossed rifles); Serjeant-major, Army Gymnastic Staff (royal arms and crossed swords); Serjeant-major, School of Gunnery (royal arms and crossed guns); Serjeant-major, Army Signal School (royal arms and crossed flags); All other warrant officers, class I)	Regimental quartermaster-serjeant (Note: Also the appointments of: Master gunner, 3rd class (crown, wreath and gun); Armourer quartermaster-serjeant, Smith quartermaster serjeant, fitter quartermaster-serjeant and armament quartermaster serjeant (crown, wreath and crossed hammer and pincers); Farrier quartermaster-corporal and farrier quartermaster-serjeant (crown, wreath and horseshoe); Laboratory quartermaster-serjeant and quartermaster-serjeant instructor in gunnery (crown, wreath and crossed guns); Quartermaster-serjeant instructor and quartermaster-serjeant, School of Musketry (crown, wreath and crossed rifles); Quartermaster-serjeant, Army Gymnastic Staff (crown, wreath and crossed swords); Sadler quartermaster-corporal and sadler quartermaster-serjeant (crown, wreath and bit); Wheeler quartermaster-serjeant (crown, wreath and wheel); Quartermaster-serjeant, Army Signal School (crown, wreath and crossed flags); Quartermaster-serjeant, R.A.M.C. (crown, wreath and Geneva Cross); Schoolmaster; Quartermaster-corporal-major; All other quartermaster-serjeants WOII)	Squadron/battery/troop/company serjeant-major (Note: Also the appointments of: Battery or company serjeant-major instructor in gunnery (crown and crossed guns); Company serjeant-major instructor in gymnastics, squadron corporal-major instructor in feeding and squadron serjeant-major instructor in gymnastics and fencing (crown and crossed swords); Company serjeant-major, School of Musketry, company serjeant-major instructor in musketry, squadron corporal-major instructor in musketry and squadron serjeant-major instructor in musketry (crown and crossed rifles); Company serjeant-major, Army Signal School (crown and crossed flags); Squadron corporal-major roughrider and squadron serjeant-major roughrider (crown and spur); Squadron corporal-major; Squadron serjeant-major; Battery serjeant-major; Troop serjeant-major; Company serjeant-major)	Squadron/battery/troop/company quartermaster-serjeant										
1918–1920	Warrant officer class I (Note: Also the appointment of WO1 bandmaster)		Warrant officer class II		Staff/colour-serjeant				Serjeant		Lance serjeant	Corporal	2nd corporal/ bombardier/ lance corporal	Private (or equivalent)	
1920–1938														No insignia	
1920–1938	Conductor R.A.O.C. (Note: The appointments of: Conductor R.A.O.C.; Staff serjeant-major, 1st class; Master gunner, 1st class (royal arms, wreath and gun))	Regimental sergeant-major	Regimental quartermaster-sergeant	Squadron/battery/troop/company sergeant-major	Squadron/battery/troop/company quartermaster-sergeant										
1920–1938	Warrant officer class I		Warrant officer class II		Staff/colour-sergeant				Sergeant		Lance sergeant	Corporal/ bombardier	Lance corporal/ lance bombardier (Note: Until 1961, lance corporal and lance bombardier were appointments for privates and gunners respectively rather than substantive ranks.)	Private (or equivalent)	
1938–1947														No insignia	
1938–1947	Conductor R.A.O.C.	Regimental sergeant-major	Regimental quartermaster-sergeant Squadron/battery/troop/company sergeant-major	Platoon/troop/section sergeant-major	Squadron/battery/troop/company quartermaster-sergeant										
1938–1947	Warrant officer class I		Warrant officer class II	Warrant officer class III (Note: Appointments to warrant officer class III were suspended in 1940. In 1947, warrant officers class II reverted to their badges of rank from before the introduction of the wrrant officer class III rank.)	Staff/colour-sergeant				Sergeant		Lance sergeant	Corporal/ bombardier	Lance corporal/ lance bombardier	Private (or equivalent)	
1947–1953														No insignia	
1947–1953	Conductor R.A.O.C.	Regimental sergeant-major	Regimental quartermaster-sergeant	Squadron/battery/troop/company sergeant-major	Squadron/battery/troop/company quartermaster-sergeant										
1947–1953	Warrant officer class I		Warrant officer class II		Staff/colour-sergeant				Sergeant		Corporal/ bombardier		Lance corporal/ lance bombardier	Private (or equivalent)	
1953–2015														No insignia	
1953–2015	Conductor RAOC (Note: The Royal Army Ordnance Corps was merged with other corps to become the Royal Logistic Corps in 1993. The equivalent rank of staff sergeant major, 1st class, was discontinued when the Royal Army Service Corps was disbanded in 1965.)	Regimental sergeant major	Regimental quartermaster sergeant	Squadron/battery/company sergeant major	Squadron/battery/company quartermaster sergeant										
1953–2015	Warrant officer class I/1		Warrant officer class II/2 (Note: Also the appointments of WO2 bandmaster and WO2 bugle, drum, pipe or trumpet major)		Staff/colour sergeant				Sergeant		Corporal/ bombardier		Lance corporal/ lance bombardier	Private (or equivalent)	
2015–2023														No insignia	
2015–2023	Command sergeant major (Note: The appointments of: Army command sergeant major; Command sergeant majors (including Royal Artillery sergeant major and the academy sergeant major, RMAS); Garrison sergeant major London district (royal arms on a four-bar chevron); Conductor, RLC (royal arms in a blue wreath); Master gunner, RA)	Regimental sergeant major (Note: The appointments of: Garrison sergeant major (except London district); Regimental corporal major; Regimental sergeant major; Staff sergeant major, RLC or AGC(SPS); Sergeant major; Any other WO1 appointment on the establishment of a unit or corps e.g. artificer sergeant major, superintending draughtsman)	Regimental quartermaster sergeant (Note: The appointments of: Garrison quartermaster sergeant; Regimental quartermaster corporal/sergeant; Regimental quartermaster corporal/sergeant (technical); Staff quartermaster sergeant; Quartermaster sergeant instructor; Quartermaster sergeant; Farrier quartermaster corporal/sergeant)	Squadron/battery/company sergeant major (Note: The appointments of: Squadron corporal major; Squadron, battery or company sergeant major; Any other WO2 appointment on the establishment of a unit or corps e.g. warrant officer instructor, class 2 (physical training))	Squadron/battery/company quartermaster sergeant (Note: The appointments of: Squadron quartermaster corporal; Squadron, battery or company quartermaster sergeant; Colour sergeant or company quartermaster sergeant (foot guards and infantry); Any other staff sergeant appointment on the establishment of a unit e.g. clerk of works staff sergeant; staff sergeant instructor; artificer staff sergeant, bandmaster)										
2015–2023	Warrant officer class 1		Warrant officer class 2		Staff/colour sergeant (Note: Also the appointments of staff sergeant rank bugle, drum, pipe or trumpet major)				Sergeant (Note: Also the appointments of: Sergeant rank bugle, drum, pipe or trumpet major; Any other sergeant appointment on the establishment of a unit e.g. pioneer sergeant, sergeant instructor)		Corporal/ bombardier		Lance corporal/ lance bombardier	Private (or equivalent)	
2023–Present														No insignia	
2023–Present	Command sergeant major	Regimental sergeant major	Regimental quartermaster sergeant	Squadron/battery/company sergeant major	Squadron/battery/company quartermaster sergeant										
2023–Present	Warrant officer class 1		Warrant officer class 2		Staff/colour sergeant				Sergeant		Corporal/ bombardier		Lance corporal/ lance bombardier	Private (or equivalent)	
NATO code	OR-9		OR-8		OR-7				OR-6	OR-5	OR-4		OR-3	OR-2	OR-1

== See also ==
- Ranks and insignia of the officers of the British Army
- Uniforms of the British Army
- Other ranks
- Ranks of the cadet forces of the United Kingdom
- List of roles in the British Army
- Comparison of United Kingdom and United States military ranks
