= Rough rider (rank) =

Former British Army rank

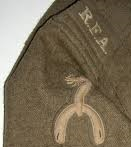
Rough rider badge

Rough rider was a now defunct rank and appointment used in the British Army, and also in some British colonial forces, by men who were responsible for training horses and teaching equitation under the supervision of the riding master (an officer commissioned from the ranks, who had usually formerly been a rough rider himself). If used as a rank it was equivalent to private, but non-commissioned officers could use it as an appointment, with designations such as troop sergeant major rough rider. Following its abolition as a rank, it continued to be used as an appointment.

The spur badge worn by rough riders is still worn by riding instructors in the King's Troop, Royal Horse Artillery, and the Household Cavalry, who still operate under the riding master. It is worn by gunners, troopers and non-commissioned officers on the right upper arm, above the rank chevrons and below the crown if worn; warrant officers wear it below the rank badge on the lower arm.

The term and badge are still used in the Royal Canadian Mounted Police.
