= Airtrooper =

British Army rank

Airtrooper (abbreviated AirTpr) is a rank used in the British Army. The lowest rank in the British Army's Army Air Corps (AAC), the rank serves as the AAC's equivalent of the rank of private.

== Army Air Corps ==
The Army Air Corps (AAC) soldier needs a good standard of education although no formal qualifications are required. Airtroopers are educated and trained to have the ability and motivation to work on their own initiative. AAC soldiers will be trained in a wide range of skills providing a number of military and civilian vocational qualifications.

The Army Air Corps provides battlefield helicopters and some fixed-wing aircraft for the army, the main roles being attack of enemy armour, surveillance and target acquisition. AAC groundcrew need to be able to work as part of a team, and on occasion as an individual, and may be expected to defend forward operating bases and forward arming refuelling points, they also refuel and re-arm the helicopters and provide the essential communications to the aircraft and other army units.

AAC groundcrew work with a number of different types of helicopters including the, Lynx, Bell 212, Gazelle and Apache. They are also required to perform a number of other responsibilities within this employment, from helicopter troop drills, fire, crash rescue and helicopter rigger marshalling. There are a number of light goods vehicles utilised by the AAC, of which all groundcrew will be trained to drive and service, including Land Rovers, Osh Kosh 22,000 litre refueller vehicles and the "detachable rack operating platform systems" (15 tonne flatbeds).

== Training ==
=== Basic training ===
All Army Air Corps groundcrew are trained to be soldiers first during their basic, or phase 1 training. Initially recruits attend basic training which is called phase 1 training either as junior entry soldiers at the Army Foundation College in Harrogate, or Army Training Regiment at Winchester, or as standard entry soldiers at the Army Training Centre Pirbright.

=== Trade training ===
Having successfully completed phase 1 training, recruits move to the School of Army Aviation, Middle Wallop, Hampshire to begin aviation employment training, or phase 2 training. This begins with a three-week induction course, including car theory, practise and tests and an in-depth insight to the AAC. On successful completion of this module, an airtrooper will then complete the additional three trade specific modules:

=== Groundhandling skills ===
The groundcrewman's course lasts three weeks.

=== Communication skills ===
The class-three signaller's course is four weeks long.

=== Aircraft refuelling/hazardous materials training ===
This three-week course qualifies an aircraft refueller operator.

On successful completion of these trade modules, an airtrooper will be loaded onto a light goods vehicle course at the Defence School of Transport, in the East Riding of Yorkshire. This course takes between 10 and 12 weeks where the airtrooper will be taught to drive and maintain light goods vehicles used in the AAC. At the end of these courses the airtrooper will be qualified as an AAC soldier class 3, ready to be posted to his/her first regiment.

== Joining a regiment ==
On completion of Phase 2 training, airtroopers are posted to a regiment in either UK or Germany. Later there may be opportunities to serve in an independent squadron or flight in a variety of locations both home and abroad. Once in a regiment an airtrooper will be allocated to a squadron and carry out the ground duties for which he/she have been trained.

== See also ==
- British Army other ranks rank insignia
- Private rank (United Kingdom)
- Trooper (rank)
