= Guardsman =

Military rank

Guardsman is a rank used instead of private in some military units that serve as the official bodyguard of a sovereign or head of state. It is also used as a generic term for any member of a guards unit of any rank.

== Canada ==
In the Canadian Forces, the rank is used by privates in the Governor General's Foot Guards and the Canadian Grenadier Guards. This honour was awarded by King George V in 1918 to mark the service of regiments of Foot Guards during the First World War. General Order 138 of 1923 promulgated this honour.

The rank is considered non-gender specific and therefore applies equally to female soldiers and is inclusive of any person who has earned the rank. The rank badge is identical to that of private, a single chevron.

== Nordic countries ==
Several Guards units in the Nordic countries use the rank. This includes the Danish Army's Gardehusarregimentet (Guard Hussar Regiment) and Den Kongelige Livgarde (Royal Life Guards), the Norwegian Army's Hans Majestet Kongens Garde (His Majesty's Royal Guard), and the Swedish Army's Life Guards. The Finnish Army’s Kaartin jääkärirykmentti (Guard Jaeger Regiment) uses the similar rank of Guard Jaeger.

== India ==
In the Indian Army the rank is used by the elite Brigade of the Guards. It is also used by the Indian Home Guards as a rank equivalent to a constable in the Indian Police Service. The rank is used for regular employees and not volunteers.

== Singapore ==
In the Singapore Armed Forces, the rank is used by the elite Singapore Guards.

== United Kingdom ==
The British Army's Foot Guards regiments have used the rank since 1920, when it was adopted instead of private. It is abbreviated Gdsm.

== United States ==
It is also used to refer to members of the National Guard of the United States, a reserve force of the U.S. Army and Air Force.
