= Platoon sergeant major =

Former military rank in the British Army

Platoon sergeant major (PSM) was an appointment in the British Army in the short-lived rank of warrant officer class III (WOIII), created in 1938 by Army Council Instruction 398.

The platoon sergeant major, and his cavalry counterpart, the troop sergeant major, were part of a project giving experienced non-commissioned officers command of units (platoons and troops) formerly reserved for commissioned officers. With the outbreak of World War II, National Service supplied the Army with enough young men suitable for commissioning, so the rank was placed in suspension in 1940 and no new appointments were made. Most existing WOIIIs were commissioned as lieutenants.

The WOIII wore a crown on his lower sleeve; WOIIs switched to a crown in a wreath during this period.
