= Platoon =

Military unit size, usually composed of two or more squads or equivalent units

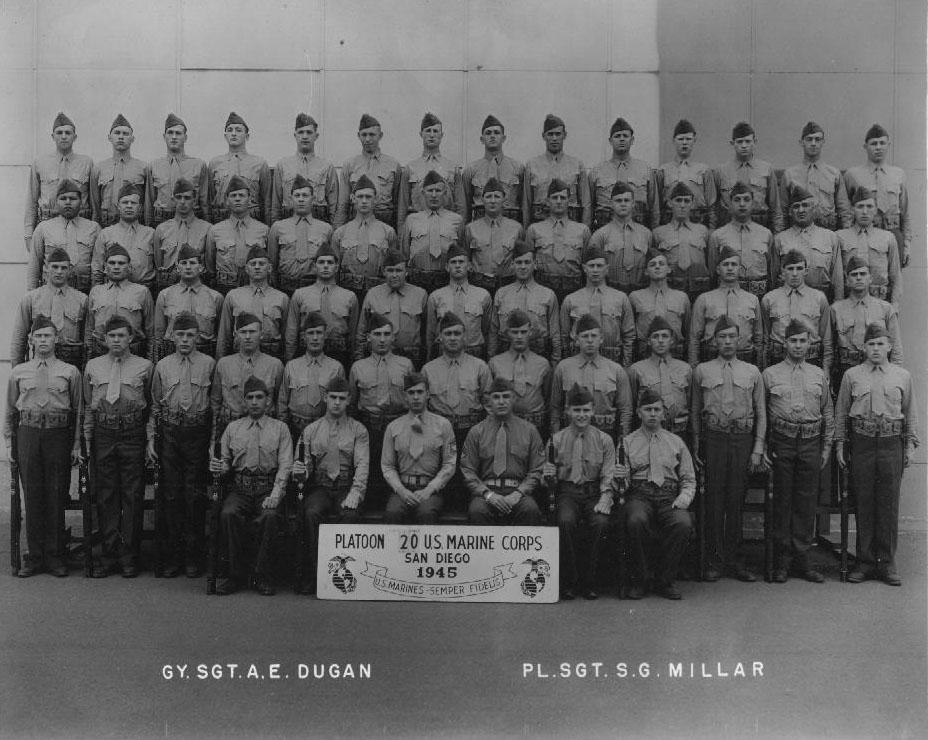
Platoon of marines from the United States Marine Corps, 1945

A platoon is a military unit typically composed of two to four squads, sections, or patrols. Platoon organization varies depending on the country and the branch, but a platoon can be composed of 20–50 troops, although specific platoons may range from 10 to 100 people. A platoon is typically the smallest military unit led by a commissioned officer. The platoon leader is usually a junior officer—a second or first lieutenant or an equivalent rank. The officer is usually assisted by a platoon sergeant.

Rifle platoons normally consist of a small platoon headquarters and three or four sections (Commonwealth) or squads (United States). In some armies, platoon is used throughout the branches of the army. In a few armies, such as the French Army, a platoon is specifically a cavalry unit, and the infantry use "section" as the equivalent unit. A unit consisting of several platoons is called a company or a battery.

== Etymology ==
According to Merriam-Webster, the word came into the English language via the French peloton ("small detachment"), from the Middle French pelote ("little ball") and derived from the Low Latin "pilotta", itself derived from the Classical Latin "pila". The use of the word is first attested in c. 1547, referring to "a subdivision of a company-sized military unit normally consisting of two or more squads or sections"." The meaning was a group of soldiers firing a volley together, while a different platoon reloaded. This suggests an augmentative intention. Since soldiers were often organized in two or three lines, each firing its volley together, this would have normally meant platoons organized so that half or a third of the company is firing at once.

The platoon was originally a firing unit rather than an organization. While the system is claimed in the 1829 London Encyclopaedia to have been introduced by Gustavus Adolphus the Great of Sweden in 1618, the "peloton" appears to predate his birth. In the French Army in the 1670s, a battalion was divided into 18 platoons who were grouped into three "firings" with each platoon either firing or reloading at any given time during a fusillade. This system was also used in the British, Austrian, Russian and Dutch armies.

== NATO ==
NATO Map Symbols
A platoon
A mechanized infantry platoon
a tank platoon
a combat engineer platoon

NATO defines a platoon, or detachment, as an organization larger than a section but smaller than a company. The standard NATO symbol for a platoon consists of three dots (●●●) placed above a framed unit icon. Member nations have stipulated the different names they use for organizations of this size.

Names for platoons in NATO member armed forces
Albania	Togë
Belgium	Peloton
Bulgaria	Взвод
Canada	Platoon, Troop, or Section
Croatia	Vod
Czech Republic	Četa
Denmark	Deling
Estonia	Rühm
Finland	Joukkue, or Jaos (artillery)
France	Section, or Peloton
Germany	Zug, or Schwarm (Luftwaffe)
Greece	Themoerea, or Ulamos (διμοιρία, or ουλαμός)
Hungary	Szakasz
Italy	Plotone, or Sezione
Latvia	Vads
Lithuania	Būrys
Montenegro	Vod
Netherlands	Peloton, Gevechtsbatterij, or Vlucht
North Macedonia	Вод
Norway	Tropp
Poland	Pluton
Portugal	Pelotão
Romania	Pluton
Slovakia	Čata
Slovenia	Vod
Spain	Sección
Sweden	Pluton
Turkey	Takım
United Kingdom	Platoon, Troop, or Flight
United States	Platoon, or Detachment

== Australia ==
In the Australian Army, an infantry platoon has thirty-six soldiers organized into three eight-man sections and a twelve-man maneuver support section, with a lieutenant as platoon commander and a sergeant as platoon sergeant, accompanied by a platoon signaller and sometimes a platoon medic (full strength of forty men). A section comprises eight soldiers led by a corporal with a lance corporal as second in command. Each section has two fireteams (sometimes three) of four men, one led by the corporal and the other by the lance corporal. Each fireteam (also called a "brick" by Australian soldiers) has one soldier with an F89 Minimi LSW and the other three armed with F88 Steyr assault rifles. One rifle per fireteam has an attached 40 mm grenade launcher; one of the grenadiers is the lance corporal. Fireteam bravo has a HK417 7.62mm for the designated marksman role. More recently, the designated marksman of each Australian fireteam has been issued the HK417 in Afghanistan and possibly afterwards. The platoon may also have three MAG 58 general-purpose machine guns, one M2 Browning heavy machine gun or a Mk 19 grenade launcher at its disposal.

== Bangladesh ==
In the Bangladesh Army, infantry regiments have platoons commanded by a warrant officer, assisted by a sergeant. The platoon strength is typically 32 soldiers. The platoon headquarter consists of 5 men; the platoon commander, sergeant, a radio operator and 2 soldiers carrying a rocket launcher. The platoon HQ commands 3 rifle section of 9 men each. A section led by a corporal, who's assisted by a lance corporal. Each section also has 2 light machine gunners.

== Canada ==
In the Canadian Army, the infantry platoon commander is a second lieutenant, lieutenant or a junior captain assisted by a platoon warrant (who holds the rank of warrant officer, but can be a sergeant). It is usually divided into three eight to ten person sections and a heavy weapons detachment that deploys a GPMG, and a Carl Gustav rifle, depending on mission requirements. Sections are commanded by a sergeant or master corporal with a master corporal or corporal in the second in command position; two members of a section carry C9 LMGs and the remainder carry C7 or C8 assault rifles fitted with either optics or a grenade launcher. A section is broken into two assault groups, similar to the British and Australian organization.

Three infantry platoons make up a typical infantry company, sometimes with a heavy weapons or support platoon in addition. Specialist platoons, like reconnaissance, or "recce" platoons, that may be attached to a battalion may be led by a captain and assisted by a warrant officer. Some large specialist platoons may have a lieutenant as the second-in-command. In many corps, platoon-sized units are called troops instead. Prior to 1940, a platoon might be commanded by either a warrant officer or a lieutenant. An officer was referred to as "platoon commander", while a warrant officer in the same position was called a platoon sergeant major.

== Colombia ==
Within the Colombian Army, a training platoon (Spanish: pelotón) is often commanded by a higher-ranking soldier known as a dragoneante, who is selected for his excellence in discipline and soldiering skills. However, a dragoneante is still a soldier and can be removed from his position if his commander sees fit. For combatant platoons (platoons engaged in combat with guerrilla rebels), a corporal or sergeant would be the most likely commander.

== France ==
Under the 1971 regulations a peloton in the French Army was used in the equivalent manner to a company, with the first section led by the sous-lieutenant and the second section led by the lieutenant, a captain commanding the entire group. In the French military, a peloton is a mainly a term designating a mobile infantry unit. An escadron is a unit of battle tanks in cavalry or armor, but in some mechanized infantry regiments (groupe de chasseurs mécanisés), the tank platoon is also called peloton de char de combat. The peloton or escadron corresponds to the platoon, equivalent in size to an infantry section and commanded by a lieutenant or sergeant. It may also mean a body of officers in training to become non-commissioned officers, sous-officiers or officers (peloton de caporal, peloton des sous-officiers).

== Georgia ==
The Georgian Armed Forces equivalent of the platoon is the ozeuli. Translated, it means "Group of 20" but has no connection with the number. It has been transferred into modern usage from medieval army reforms of the Georgian King David IV. Originally, it was meant to be a small detachment of 20 men to be led by a leader of corresponding rank. Almost all smaller formations are based on the designations of those reforms, which originally suggested tactical flexibility by keeping the size of small units in round numbers (10, 20, 100). Battalions and brigades were not affected by that system. It is unknown whether that usage was abandoned in the 1820s or earlier, but in present days a Georgian platoon still called "Ozeuili" has a similar size to that of other armies. Normally for infantry it has 32 men but can vary depending on the type of unit.

== Germany ==
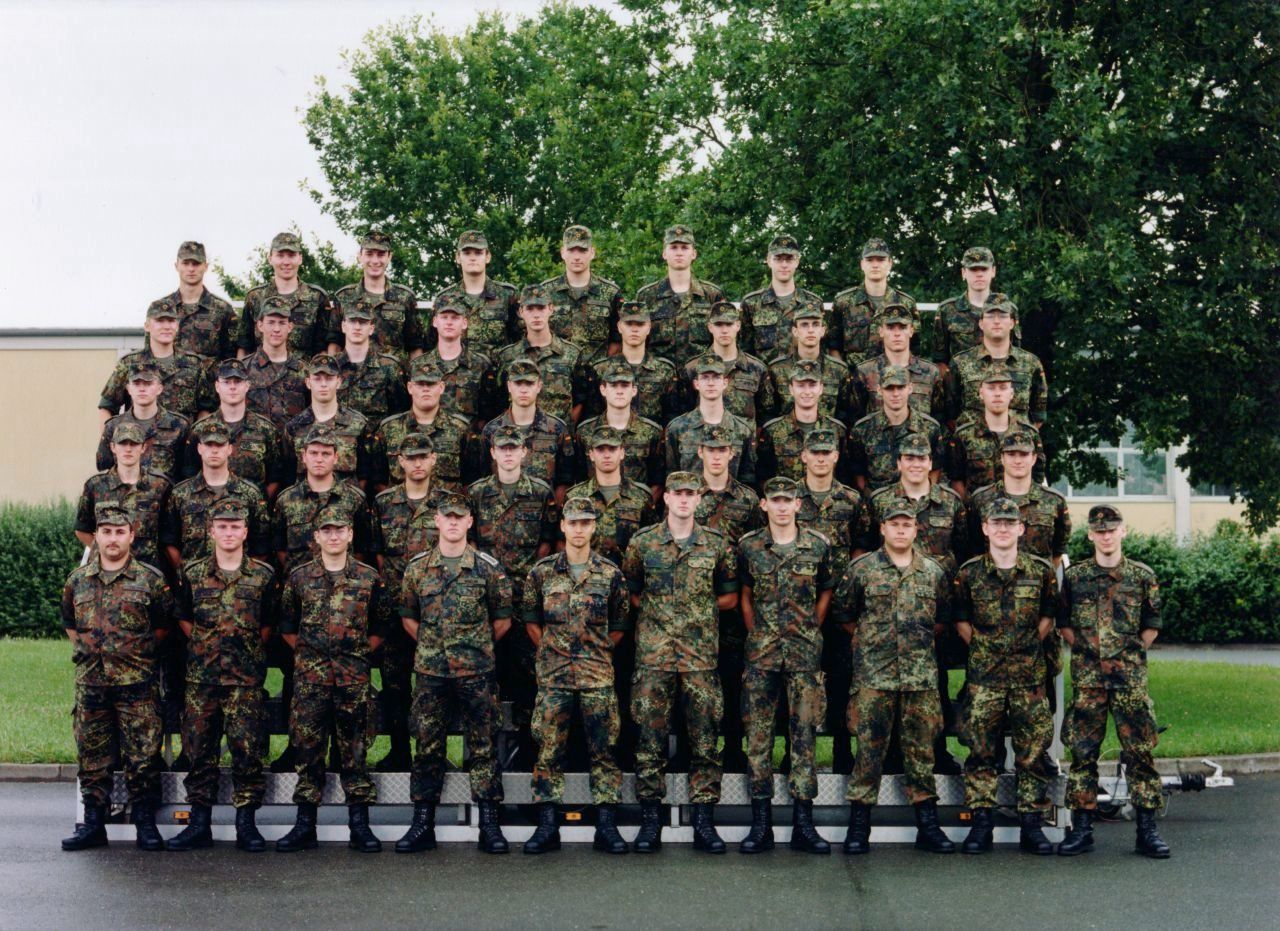
Platoon ("Zug" in German) of the German Bundeswehr

The German Army equivalent of the platoon is the Zug (same word as for train, draught, move or streak), consisting of a Zugtrupp ("platoon troop" or platoon headquarters squad), of four to six men, and three squads (Gruppen) of eight to eleven men each. An Oberfeldwebel ("sergeant first class") is in charge of the Zugtrupp. The Zugtrupp provides support for the platoon leader and acts as a reserve force (such as two additional snipers or an anti-tank weapon crew).

Three Züge make up a Kompanie ("company"). The first platoon, until 2013, used to be commanded by an Oberleutnant ("first lieutenant") or a Leutnant ("second lieutenant"), nowadays it is usually a Hauptmann ("captain"), who is also the Kompanie's second-in-command. The second Zug is led by an Oberleutnant or a Leutnant, the third Zug is led by experienced NCOs, usually a Hauptfeldwebel ("master sergeant"). In the first platoon, the platoon leader's assistant is a Hauptfeldwebel; in the second and third platoons, the assistant is an Oberfeldwebel. Each squad is led by an Oberfeldwebel, and its size corresponds to the typical passenger capacity of its squad vehicle (either wheeled or armored). Another of these vehicles is used for the Zugtrupp. Sergeants of inferior rank act as assistant squad leaders in the other squads.

A Fallschirmjägerzug ("airborne infantry platoon") has special operations responsibilities and has command positions one rank higher than corresponding positions in a standard infantry platoon. A captain (Hauptmann) is the platoon leader, assisted by a first lieutenant and each squad has a second lieutenant or a master sergeant in charge, often supported by a long-service sergeant or skilled senior corporal.

== Hungary ==
In the Hungarian Armed Forces, a rifle platoon is commanded by either a second lieutenant or a first lieutenant, with a platoon sergeant (with the rank of sergeant major), a platoon signaller, an armored personnel carrier (APC) driver and an APC gunner composing the platoon headquarters. There is also in the HQ's TO&E a designated marksman rifle—either an SVD or a Szép sniper rifle. The platoon is sub-divided into three squads, each with eight soldiers. Each squad is commanded by a sergeant. His/her deputy has an RPG, there are also two soldiers with PKM machine guns, two with AK-63 assault rifles—one is an RPG grenadier, the other is the medic—the APC driver and the APC gunner. Each squad and the platoon headquarters is equipped with an BTR-80 armored personnel carrier. In total, the platoon comprises 29 soldiers, of whom eight are vehicle crew.

== India ==
In the Indian army, a platoon consists of three sections. Platoons are commanded by junior commissioned officers (JCOs). Sections are the smallest components in the Indian army consisting of ten men and commanded by a havildar. In the Corps of Engineers, a platoon in an engineer company (referred to as a "field company") differs from an infantry platoon, in that it has four sections of ten man, comprising nine sappers and an NCO, and is referred to as a "field platoon".

== Israel ==
The Israel Defense Forces (IDF) uses platoons (Hebrew: mahlakot, literally "divisions") as the basic unit composing the company and usually consists of 20 to 40 soldiers (or 3–4 tanks in the Armored Corps). Those soldiers are divided into 2–4 "classes" (kitot) or teams (tzvatim), each composing of 6–21 soldiers. The platoon is the smallest military unit commanded by a commissioned officer—and all officers graduating from the IDF's Officer's Academy receive a "platoon commander" pin, even if they are not intended to command a platoon. The platoon commander is usually the equivalent of first or second lieutenant and is assisted and advised by a platoon sergeant, acting as his replacement. In some elite units, such as Maglan, Egoz or Duvdevan, the teams are usually smaller and commanded by officers, with the platoon commanded by a higher-ranking officer, while in special forces units like Shayetet 13 and Sayeret Matkal all combatants are officers.

== Myanmar ==
In Myanmar, a Platoon is called တပ်စု (Tat Su). A Rifle Platoon has an authorised strength of 1 Officer and 34 Other Ranks. A total of 35 soldiers. The platoon is commanded by either a Lieutenant (ဗိုလ်) or a Captain (ဗိုလ်ကြီး) who is assisted by a Sergeant (တပ်ကြပ်ကြီး) as of the structure. A Platoon has 3 Sections all of which are commanded by a Corporal (တပ်ကြပ်) with a Lance Corporal (ဒုတပ်ကြပ်) as 2IC. A Section is called တပ်စိတ် (Tat Sate). A Platoon HQ consist of Platoon Commander (Lieutenant/Captain), Platoon Second in Command (Sergeant), Mortar Crew 1 (Private), Mortar Crew 2 (Private) and a Signaller (Private). As of the authorised structure, the mortar is a MA 9 60mm Commando Mortar.

The Platoon is structured as below:

Platoon HQ (1 Officer, 4 Other Ranks):

- Platoon Officer Commanding (Platoon Commander): Lieutenant/Captain: MA 3 Carbine, MA 5 Pistol
- Platoon Second in Command (Platoon Sergeant): Sergeant: MA 3 Carbine
- Mortar Crew 1: Private: MA 9 60mm Commando Mortar
- Mortar Crew 2: Private: MA 3 Carbine
- Signaller: Private: MA 3 Carbine
- No. (1) Rifle Section (10 Other Ranks): Corporal
- No. (2) Rifle Section (10 Other Ranks): Corporal
- No. (3) Rifle Section (10 Other Ranks): Corporal

Each Section, consisting of 10 Other Ranks, is structured with:

- Section HQ and MG Team: 4 Other Ranks
- Section Commander: Corporal: MA 3 Carbine
- Section Second in Command/MG Team Commander: Lance Corporal: MA 3 Carbine
- Gunner: Private: MA 2 Light Machine Gun
- Gunner; Private: MA 2 Light Machine Gun

Team 1: 3 Other Ranks

- Team Commander: Lance Corporal: MA 1 Assault Rifle
- Grenadier: Private: MA 4 Assault Rifle (MA 1 with UBGL)
- Rifleman: Private: MA 1 Assault Rifle

Team 2: 3 Other Ranks

- Team Commander: Lance Corporal: MA 1 Assault Rifle
- Grenadier: Private: MA 4 Assault Rifle (MA 1 with UBGL)
- Rifleman: Private: MA 1 Assault Rifle

== New Zealand ==
In the New Zealand Army, an infantry platoon is commanded by a 2nd lieutenant or a lieutenant, with a platoon sergeant, a platoon signaller and a medic (where relevant) composing the platoon headquarters. The platoon is sub-divided into three section of between 7-10 soldiers, each commanded by a corporal with a lance-corporal as the section second in command. Each section can be sub-divided into two fire-teams, commanded by the section commander and second in command respectively, as well as normal two man scout, rifle and gun teams. There are three platoons in a rifle company, which is commanded by a major, and three rifle companies in an infantry battalion, which is commanded by a lieutenant-colonel. An infantry battalion contains an organic support company (mortars, machine guns, etc.) and a logistics company (transport and stores).

== Philippines ==
Philippine Army rifle platoons consists of three squads, each with nine men. The nine men of a squad are grouped into two smaller "fire teams", each comprising four troops: a team leader (corporal armed with a R4 assault rifle and a M203 grenade launcher), an automatic rifleman (armed with a K3 squad automatic weapon), a rifleman (armed with a R4; also brings extra ammunition for the K3), and a designated marksman who used to be armed by a M-14 before the Army shifted to the R4 for this role. The squad leader is typically a sergeant while the platoon leader is typically a 2nd lieutenant on his first assignment. The lieutenant is supported by a platoon sergeant. A radioman and a medic is usually supplied by the battalion. Philippine Marine Corps rifle platoons are similar in organization and concept to Philippine Army rifle platoons.

== Singapore ==
In the Singapore Army, a platoon is a lieutenant's billet. However, in practice, a second lieutenant is usually appointed and then eventually promoted. A typical infantry platoon consists of three seven-man sections of riflemen and a machine gun team, both commanded by third sergeants, a platoon sergeant, a signaler/runner and a platoon medic for a total of 28 soldiers. Beginning in 1992, the Singapore Armed Forces has allowed warrant officers to be appointed as platoon commanders.

== South Africa ==
In the South African Army, a platoon usually consists of 27 soldiers and 1 officer organized into three sections 10 soldiers each plus an HQ which contains 8 men. A lieutenant as platoon commander and a sergeant as platoon sergeant, accompanied by a signaller and a patmor group of two men. A section comprises 10 soldiers led by a corporal who's assisted by a lance corporal as second in command. The corporal is in charge of all the soldiers except the light machine gun (LMG) group which is led by the lance corporal. The LMG group is armed with the SS77 while rest of the platoon is armed with R4 assault rifles, with rifle grenades if available. There's also the grenade launcher within each section.

== Soviet Union ==
A motorized rifle platoon in the Soviet Armed Forces was mounted in either BTR armored personnel carriers or BMP infantry fighting vehicles, with the former being more numerous into the late 1980s. Both were led by a platoon leader and assistant platoon leader and consisted of three 9-man rifle squads mounted in three vehicles. In both BMP and BTR squads, the driver and vehicle gunner stayed with the vehicle when the rest of the squad dismounted, and one squad in the platoon would have one of their rifleman armed with an SVD sniper rifle. There was either one empty seat in each BTR or two empty seats in each BMP to accommodate the platoon leader and assistant platoon leader.

Tank platoons prior to the late 1980s consisted of a platoon headquarters squad and three tank squads, each consisting of one T-64, T-72 or T-80 tank for 12 personnel and 4 tanks total; platoons that used the older T-54, T-55 or T-62s added another crewmember for a total of 16. However, tank units operating in Eastern Europe began to standardize their platoons to just two tank squads, for a total of 3 tanks and 9 personnel.

== Sweden ==
In the Swedish Army, a platoon is organized in the following way, according to Markstridsreglemente 4 Pluton (Ground combat regulation 4 Platoon):

- Chefsgrupp (Leadership squad)
  - Plutonschef—Platoon leader.
  - Ställföreträdande plutonschef—Deputy platoon leader.
  - Plutonsbefäl—Platoon NCO.
  - Signalist—Radio operator.
  - Fordonsförare—Vehicle driver.
  - Tolk—Interpreter (only present for deployments abroad).
- 3-4 Skyttegrupp (Rifle squad)
  - Gruppchef - Squad Leader
  - Ställföreträdande gruppchef - Deputy squad leader.
  - 2 soldater tillika kulspruteskyttar - 2 machine-gunners.
  - 2 soldater tillika pansarskotts-/granatgevärsskyttar/fordonsförare - 2 riflemen armed with AT4/Carl Gustav gunner and loader/vehicle driver.
  - 1 soldat tillika skarpskytt - 1 marksman.
  - 1 soldat tillika stridssjukvårdare - 1 combat medic.

== Thailand ==
In the Royal Thai Army, a platoon is commanded by either a lieutenant or second lieutenant, assisted by a platoon sergeant, usually of the rank of sergeant major. In infantry units, rifle platoons are generally made up of five squads. These are three 11-man rifle squads, one 8-man command squad (consisting of platoon commander, sergeant, radio operator, 2 assistants and a 3-man weapons team) and one 9-man machine gun squad. Totaling at 50 soldiers

== United Kingdom ==
Platoons have been used by England (and subsequently the United Kingdom) since the 16th century. On 1 October 1913, General Sir Ivor Maxse introduced a scheme to reorganize the army. The regular battalions of the British Army were reorganized from the previous eight companies to a four-company structure, with each company having four platoons as separate units, each commanded by a lieutenant or second lieutenant with a platoon sergeant as his deputy. Each platoon was divided into four sections, each commanded by a corporal. Because of a shortage of officers, the rank of warrant officer class III (platoon sergeant major) was introduced in 1938 for experienced non-commissioned officers who were given command of platoons. This was abolished in 1940, with most existing PSMs being commissioned.

In the modern British Army, an infantry platoon consists of three sections of eight men, plus a signaller (radio operator), a platoon sergeant (sergeant) and the platoon commander (second lieutenant or lieutenant). This may also include a mortar man operating a light mortar (full strength of 27 men and one officer); this may not be the case for all British infantry units, however, since the 51 mm mortars are not always part of a platoon's Table of Organization and Equipment, post-Afghanistan. Under Army 2020, a platoon in the Heavy Protected Mobility Regiments consist of around 30 soldiers in four Mastiff PPV/FRES UV vehicles.

Each section is commanded by a corporal (lance sergeant in the Foot Guards), with a lance corporal as second-in-command and six riflemen, divided into two four-man fireteams. Support weapons platoons (such as mortar or anti-tank platoons) are generally larger and are commanded by a captain with a colour sergeant or warrant officer class 2 as second-in-command.

== United States ==
A platoon in the United States Army is generally the smallest unit to be commanded by a commissioned officer, known as the platoon leader, currently a first or second lieutenant. The senior-most non-commissioned officer assists the platoon leader as platoon sergeant, currently a sergeant first class.

The exact size and composition of platoons in the US Army depends on the time period and their intended mission. Among the Combat arms a platoon consists of several squads or a similar number of armored fighting vehicles, while combat service support platoons are organized based on their function. Several platoons are combined into a company, with each platoon receiving a numerical designation for identification.

=== Historical background ===
From the 16th century until the late 17th century in what would become the United States, an infantry platoon was a "half company" commanded by a lieutenant, assisted by two sergeants and two corporals (increased in 1861 to four corporals). The sergeants, assisted by the corporals, led the two sections (half-platoons) and the squads (the terms were often used interchangeably until 1891) of the platoon.

In the American Civil War, drill manuals used to train both sides described how a company could be divided into two platoons, which could be further subdivided into two sections of two squads. However, few references are made regarding the use of platoons in combat. One exception was when a company was deployed as skirmishers: one platoon formed a skirmish line while the other took up position 150 paces behind as support.

When new drill manuals were published in 1891, they retained the organization of a company divided into two platoons commanded by lieutenants. There was now though greater emphasis on the use of platoons and squads advancing and providing fire support for each other. During the Spanish–American War an infantry company making a frontal assault would advance in rushes: one platoon running forward about fifty yards before going prone, whereupon the other platoon would rise up and rush past it, until close enough to assault the enemy's positions.

==== World War I ====
By the end of World War I in 1918, the rifle platoon had expanded to its largest size in U.S. Army history into a unit of 59 soldiers. This platoon organization included one lieutenant, three sergeants, eight corporals, 15 privates first class, and 32 privates. The platoon was organized into a six-man platoon headquarters (including the platoon commander, a sergeant as "assistant to platoon commander", and four privates as "runners" or messengers) and four sections. The sections were specialized by primary weapon, and each contained a different number of men. The "Riflemen" and "Automatic Riflemen" sections were each led by a sergeant and divided into two squads of eight and seven men each, respectively, including a corporal to lead each squad. The "Hand Bombers" (i.e., hand grenade throwers) and "Rifle Grenadiers" sections had a total of twelve and nine men each, respectively, including two corporals each, but no sergeant.

==== World War II ====
===== Infantry =====
The doctrinal role of American infantry during World War II was to seize and hold territory. This was primarily done as part of an overall doctrine of combined arms, but the infantry was capable of acting on their own to accomplish their mission. When facing against another combined force or organized defensive position, however, infantry acting independently was at a disadvantage.

Rifle Platoon (Rifle Company, 1943–1945)
Personnel	Role	Personal weapons & equipment	General weapons & equipment
Platoon Headquarters
1 × 1st Lieutenant	Platoon Commander	1 × M1 carbine	1 × SCR-536 radio set 2 × M13 binoculars 1 × M7 grenade launcher
1 × Staff Sergeant (Note: Tech Sergeant starting Feb 1944)	Platoon Sergeant	1 × M1 rifle	1 × SCR-536 radio set 2 × M13 binoculars 1 × M7 grenade launcher
1 × Sergeant (Note: Staff Sergeant starting Feb 1944)	Platoon Guide	1 × M1 rifle	1 × SCR-536 radio set 2 × M13 binoculars 1 × M7 grenade launcher
2 × Privates	Messengers	2 × M1 rifles	1 × SCR-536 radio set 2 × M13 binoculars 1 × M7 grenade launcher
Rifle Squad × 3
1 × Sergeant (Note: Staff Sergeant starting Feb 1944)	Squad Leader	1 × M1 rifle	3 × M7 grenade launchers
1 × Corporal (Note: Sergeant starting Feb 1944)	Squad Leader Assistant	1 × M1 rifle	3 × M7 grenade launchers
1 × Private	Automatic Rifleman	1 × M1918 BAR	3 × M7 grenade launchers
1 × Private	Automatic Rifleman Assistant	1 × M1 rifle	3 × M7 grenade launchers
1 × Private	Ammunition Bearer	1 × M1 rifle	3 × M7 grenade launchers
7 × Privates	Riflemen	7 × M1 rifles	3 × M7 grenade launchers
1 officer, 40 enlisted men

The rifle platoon was the principal subunit of a rifle company with three per company; in turn each platoon was composed of three rifle squads. This mirrored the "triangular" format of larger units, allowing for two subunits to engage in combat while the third remained in reserve as support.

- When marching, a rifle platoon would be deployed as the vanguard or rearguard for its parent company, or deployed as an outpost when the march came to a halt. Individual squads would be sent out to scout ahead, patrol the surrounding area or stand guard as sentinels.
- On the defensive, a rifle platoon placed on the front line could occupy an area 250–500 yards in length and no more than 200 yards in depth, depending on the terrain. Individual squads were placed so as to cover a given sector of the defensive line and provide supporting fire for adjacent platoons. The support platoon was situated behind the front line platoons so as to provide supporting fire, protect the flanks and rear, and if necessary counterattack in case of enemy penetration.
- When attacking, the rifle platoon's squads would conduct a frontal assault using fire and movement to close with and overrun the enemy's position. While a large flanking maneuver was rarely possible, depending on the terrain and other factors using one or two squads to assault the enemy while the third maneuvered to attack their flank could also be carried out. Likewise the support platoon would provide supporting fire to the attacking platoons, moving up to replace one of them or help secure the objective if necessary, or repel an enemy counterattack.

Within the platoon's headquarters, the platoon guide was responsible for preserving platoon cohesion and maintaining proper cover, concealment, and discipline among the soldiers; of the two messengers one remained with the platoon while the other was assigned to the company commander. Additionally, one of the platoon's riflemen would be designated its sharpshooter and armed with a M1903A4 Springfield (replaced with a M1C rifle starting Jan 1945) Lastly, the rifle platoon had a combat medic assigned to it from the parent battalion's medical detachment.

Weapons Platoon (Rifle Company, 1943–1945)
Personnel	Role	Personal weapons & equipment	General weapons & equipment	Vehicles
Platoon Headquarters
1 × 1st Lieutenant	Platoon Commander	1 × M1 carbine	1 × SCR-536; 1 × M2 Browning; 3 × bazooka	2 × ¼-ton trucks 2 × ¼-ton trailers
1 × Staff Sergeant (Note: Tech Sergeant starting Feb 1944)	Platoon Sergeant	1 × M1 rifle	1 × SCR-536; 1 × M2 Browning; 3 × bazooka	2 × ¼-ton trucks 2 × ¼-ton trailers
2 × Tec 5/Privates	Light truck drivers	2 × M1 rifle 2 × M7 grenade launchers	1 × SCR-536; 1 × M2 Browning; 3 × bazooka	2 × ¼-ton trucks 2 × ¼-ton trailers
2 × Privates	Messengers	2 × M1 rifles	1 × SCR-536; 1 × M2 Browning; 3 × bazooka	2 × ¼-ton trucks 2 × ¼-ton trailers
60mm Mortar Section
Section Headquarters
1 × Sergeant (Note: Staff Sergeant starting Feb 1944)	Section Leader	1 × M1 rifle		
1 × Private	Messenger	1 × M1 carbine		
60mm Mortar Squad × 3
1 × Corporal (Note: Sergeant starting Feb 1944)	Squad Leader	1 × M1 rifle	1 × M2 mortar	
1 × Private	Mortar Gunner	1 × pistol	1 × M2 mortar	
1 × Private	Mortar Gunner Assistant	1 × pistol	1 × M2 mortar	
2 × Privates	Ammunition Bearers	2 × M1 carbines	1 × M2 mortar	
Light Machine Gun Section
Section Headquarters
1 × Sergeant (Note: Staff Sergeant starting Feb 1944)	Section Leader	1 × M1 rifle		
1 × Private	Messenger	1 × M1 carbine		
Light Machine Gun Squad × 2
1 × Corporal (Note: Sergeant starting Feb 1944)	Squad Leader	1 × M1 rifle	1 × M1919A6 Browing	
1 × Private	Machine Gunner	1 × pistol	1 × M1919A6 Browing	
1 × Private	Machine Gunner Assistant	1 × pistol	1 × M1919A6 Browing	
2 × Privates	Ammunition Bearers	2 × M1 carbines	1 × M1919A6 Browing	
1 officer, 34 enlisted men

The weapons platoon provided the rifle company with heavy weapon support which was still mobile enough to maneuver along with the rest of the company. The platoon was normally under company command and its constituent parts rarely attached to rifle platoons as it placed additional burden on the platoon commanders. In instances where it was necessary to provide additional firepower to a rifle platoon, a mortar squad could be attached to a rifle platoon, particular for hitting targets that could not be hit by direct fire. Attaching a light machine gun squad to a rifle platoon was only done in exceptional circumstances.

Caliber .30 Machine Gun Platoon (Heavy Weapons Company, 1943–1945)
Personnel	Role	Personal weapons & equipment	General weapons & equipment	Vehicles
Platoon Headquarters
1 × 1st Lieutenant	Platoon Commander	1 × M1 carbine	1 × SCR-536; 1 × M8 grenade launcher 2 × Bazooka	1 × ¼-ton truck
1 × Staff Sergeant (Note: Tech Sergeant starting February 1944)	Platoon Sergeant	1 × M1 carbine	1 × SCR-536; 1 × M8 grenade launcher 2 × Bazooka	1 × ¼-ton truck
1 × Corporal	Instrument corporal	1 × M1 rifle	1 × SCR-536; 1 × M8 grenade launcher 2 × Bazooka	1 × ¼-ton truck
1 x Corporal	Transportation corporal	1 × M1 rifle	1 × SCR-536; 1 × M8 grenade launcher 2 × Bazooka	1 × ¼-ton truck
2 x Privates	Messenger (Note: One of them drove the ¼-ton truck)	2 x M1 carbines	1 × SCR-536; 1 × M8 grenade launcher 2 × Bazooka	1 × ¼-ton truck
Caliber .30 Machine Gun Section x 2
Section Headquarters
1 × Sergeant (Note: Staff Sergeant starting Feb 1944)	Section Leader	1 × M1 rifle		
Caliber .30 Machine Gun Squad x 2
1 × Corporal (Note: Sergeant starting Feb 1944)	Squad Leader	1 × M1 rifle	1 × M1917A1 Browning; 1 x M7 grenade launcher 1 x M8 grenade launcher	1 x ¼-ton truck 1 x ¼-ton trailer
1 × Private	Machine Gunner	1 × pistol	1 × M1917A1 Browning; 1 x M7 grenade launcher 1 x M8 grenade launcher	1 x ¼-ton truck 1 x ¼-ton trailer
1 × Private	Machine Gunner Assistant	1 × pistol	1 × M1917A1 Browning; 1 x M7 grenade launcher 1 x M8 grenade launcher	1 x ¼-ton truck 1 x ¼-ton trailer
4 × Privates	Ammunition Bearers (Note: One of them drove the ¼-ton truck)	4 × M1 carbines	1 × M1917A1 Browning; 1 x M7 grenade launcher 1 x M8 grenade launcher	1 x ¼-ton truck 1 x ¼-ton trailer
1 officer, 35 enlisted men

The machine gun platoon was part of the heavy weapons company, which provided heavy weapons support for an infantry battalion. The platoon could be assigned to provide general fire support for the battalion as a whole, during which one of the messengers would be assigned to the battalion command post, or be attached to a rifle company to provide additional firepower, during which the messenger would be assigned to the rifle company's commander. Within the platoon headquarters, the instrument corporal assisted the platoon leader with reconnoitering where to set up the platoon and the platoon's observation post and computing fire data. The transportation corporal oversaw the movement of weapons prior to combat, their use of concealment and camouflage, and ammunition resupply during combat. The platoon also had a combat medic assigned to it from the parent battalion's medical detachment.

81mm Mortar Platoon (Heavy Weapons Company, 1943–1945)
Personnel	Role	Personal weapons & equipment	General weapons & equipment	Vehicles
Platoon Headquarters
1 × 1st Lieutenant	Platoon Commander	1 × M1 carbine	1 × SCR-536; 2 × Bazooka	1 × ¼-ton truck
1 × Staff Sergeant (Note: Tech Sergeant starting February 1944)	Platoon Sergeant	1 × M1 carbine	1 × SCR-536; 2 × Bazooka	1 × ¼-ton truck
1 × Corporal	Instrument corporal	1 × M1 rifle	1 × SCR-536; 2 × Bazooka	1 × ¼-ton truck
1 x Corporal	Transportation corporal	1 × M1 rifle	1 × SCR-536; 2 × Bazooka	1 × ¼-ton truck
2 x Privates	Messenger (Note: One of them drove the ¼-ton truck)	2 x M1 carbines	1 × SCR-536; 2 × Bazooka	1 × ¼-ton truck
81mm Mortar Section x 3
Section Headquarters
1 × 2nd Lieutenant	Section Commander	1 × M1 carbine		
1 × Sergeant (Note: Staff Sergeant starting February 1944)	Section Leader	1 × M1 rifle		
81mm Mortar Squad x 2
1 × Sergeant (Note: Staff Sergeant starting Feb 1944)	Squad Leader	1 × M1 rifle	1 × M1 mortar 1 x M8 grenade launcher	1 x ¼-ton truck 1 x ¼-ton trailer
1 × Corporal	Mortar Gunner	1 × pistol	1 × M1 mortar 1 x M8 grenade launcher	1 x ¼-ton truck 1 x ¼-ton trailer
1 × Private	Mortar Gunner Assistant	1 × pistol	1 × M1 mortar 1 x M8 grenade launcher	1 x ¼-ton truck 1 x ¼-ton trailer
1 x Private	Ammunition Bearer	1 x pistol	1 × M1 mortar 1 x M8 grenade launcher	1 x ¼-ton truck 1 x ¼-ton trailer
4 × Privates	Ammunition Bearers (Note: One of them drove the ¼-ton truck)	4 × M1 carbines	1 × M1 mortar 1 x M8 grenade launcher	1 x ¼-ton truck 1 x ¼-ton trailer
4 officers, 56 enlisted men

The mortar platoon was part of the heavy weapons company, which provided heavy weapons support for an infantry battalion. Unlike with the machine gun platoons, the mortar platoon was never attached to rifle companies and so always remained under battalion control, with one of the messengers assigned to the battalion command post. The instrument and transportation corporals functioned the same within the mortar platoon as they did within the machine gun platoons. The platoon also had a combat medic assigned to it from the parent battalion's medical detachment.

===== Engineers =====
Combat engineers in the US Army during World War II played an important role in supporting other units via their special engineering knowledge and equipment, with a secondary role as a combat unit in their own right. This included engineer reconnaissance, building bridges, laying minefields, and breaching obstacles. Each infantry division was assigned an Engineer Combat Battalion, from which an engineer combat company would form part of a regimental combat team.

Engineer Platoon (Engineer Combat Company, 1943–1945)
Personnel	Role	Personal weapons & equipment	General weapons & equipment	Vehicles
Platoon Headquarters
1 × 1st Lieutenant	Platoon Commander	1 × M1 carbine	1 × M2 Browning; 2 x M1917A1 Browning; 1 × M8 grenade launcher 1 × SCR-625 mine detector 1 x no.3 carpenter set 1 x no.2 demolition set 1 x no.3 pioneer set	1 × ¼-ton truck 1 x 2½-ton 6×6 truck 1 × ¼-ton trailer 1 x 1-ton trailer 1 x 2½-ton trailer (bridging equipment)
1 × Staff Sergeant	Platoon Sergeant	1 × M1 carbine	1 × M2 Browning; 2 x M1917A1 Browning; 1 × M8 grenade launcher 1 × SCR-625 mine detector 1 x no.3 carpenter set 1 x no.2 demolition set 1 x no.3 pioneer set	1 × ¼-ton truck 1 x 2½-ton 6×6 truck 1 × ¼-ton trailer 1 x 1-ton trailer 1 x 2½-ton trailer (bridging equipment)
1 x Sergeant (Note: Removed 13 March 1944)	Weapons Sergeant	1 x M1 Rifle	1 × M2 Browning; 2 x M1917A1 Browning; 1 × M8 grenade launcher 1 × SCR-625 mine detector 1 x no.3 carpenter set 1 x no.2 demolition set 1 x no.3 pioneer set	1 × ¼-ton truck 1 x 2½-ton 6×6 truck 1 × ¼-ton trailer 1 x 1-ton trailer 1 x 2½-ton trailer (bridging equipment)
1 × Tec 5	Light truck driver (Note: Drove the ¼-ton truck)	1 x M3 SMG	1 × M2 Browning; 2 x M1917A1 Browning; 1 × M8 grenade launcher 1 × SCR-625 mine detector 1 x no.3 carpenter set 1 x no.2 demolition set 1 x no.3 pioneer set	1 × ¼-ton truck 1 x 2½-ton 6×6 truck 1 × ¼-ton trailer 1 x 1-ton trailer 1 x 2½-ton trailer (bridging equipment)
1 × Private	Light truck driver (Note: Drove the 2½-ton truck)	1 × M1 rifle	1 × M2 Browning; 2 x M1917A1 Browning; 1 × M8 grenade launcher 1 × SCR-625 mine detector 1 x no.3 carpenter set 1 x no.2 demolition set 1 x no.3 pioneer set	1 × ¼-ton truck 1 x 2½-ton 6×6 truck 1 × ¼-ton trailer 1 x 1-ton trailer 1 x 2½-ton trailer (bridging equipment)
1 x Tec 5	Toolroom keeper	1 x M1 Rifle	1 × M2 Browning; 2 x M1917A1 Browning; 1 × M8 grenade launcher 1 × SCR-625 mine detector 1 x no.3 carpenter set 1 x no.2 demolition set 1 x no.3 pioneer set	1 × ¼-ton truck 1 x 2½-ton 6×6 truck 1 × ¼-ton trailer 1 x 1-ton trailer 1 x 2½-ton trailer (bridging equipment)
Engineer Section
Operating Unit x 3
1 × Sergeant	Unit foreman	1 × M1 rifle	1 x Bazooka; 1 x M7 grenade launcher 1 x M1 mine probe 1 x no.1 carpenter set 1 x no.1 demolition set 1 x no.1 pioneer set	1 x 2½-ton 6×6 truck (dump)
1 × Corporal	Unit foreman assistant	1 × M1 rifle	1 x Bazooka; 1 x M7 grenade launcher 1 x M1 mine probe 1 x no.1 carpenter set 1 x no.1 demolition set 1 x no.1 pioneer set	1 x 2½-ton 6×6 truck (dump)
1 × Tec 4/Tec 5	Carpenter, Bridge	1 × M1 rifle	1 x Bazooka; 1 x M7 grenade launcher 1 x M1 mine probe 1 x no.1 carpenter set 1 x no.1 demolition set 1 x no.1 pioneer set	1 x 2½-ton 6×6 truck (dump)
2 x Tec 4/Tec 5	Carpenters, General	2 x M1 rifles	1 x Bazooka; 1 x M7 grenade launcher 1 x M1 mine probe 1 x no.1 carpenter set 1 x no.1 demolition set 1 x no.1 pioneer set	1 x 2½-ton 6×6 truck (dump)
1 × Private	Demolition man	1 × M1 rifle	1 x Bazooka; 1 x M7 grenade launcher 1 x M1 mine probe 1 x no.1 carpenter set 1 x no.1 demolition set 1 x no.1 pioneer set	1 x 2½-ton 6×6 truck (dump)
1 × Tec 5/Private	Light truck driver	1 × M1 rifle	1 x Bazooka; 1 x M7 grenade launcher 1 x M1 mine probe 1 x no.1 carpenter set 1 x no.1 demolition set 1 x no.1 pioneer set	1 x 2½-ton 6×6 truck (dump)
1 x Private or Tec 5 (Note: 1 Private and 2 Tec 5s per engineer section)	Electrician	1 x M1 rifle	1 x Bazooka; 1 x M7 grenade launcher 1 x M1 mine probe 1 x no.1 carpenter set 1 x no.1 demolition set 1 x no.1 pioneer set	1 x 2½-ton 6×6 truck (dump)
1 x Private	Jackhammer operator	1 x M1 rifle	1 x Bazooka; 1 x M7 grenade launcher 1 x M1 mine probe 1 x no.1 carpenter set 1 x no.1 demolition set 1 x no.1 pioneer set	1 x 2½-ton 6×6 truck (dump)
2 x Privates	Repairmen, utility	2 x M1 rifles	1 x Bazooka; 1 x M7 grenade launcher 1 x M1 mine probe 1 x no.1 carpenter set 1 x no.1 demolition set 1 x no.1 pioneer set	1 x 2½-ton 6×6 truck (dump)
2 × Privates	Riggers	2 × M1 rifles	1 x Bazooka; 1 x M7 grenade launcher 1 x M1 mine probe 1 x no.1 carpenter set 1 x no.1 demolition set 1 x no.1 pioneer set	1 x 2½-ton 6×6 truck (dump)
1 officer, 44 enlisted men (Note: 43 enlisted men March 1944)

=== Modern ===
In the United States Army, rifle platoons are normally composed of 42 soldiers. They consist of three rifle squads, one weapons squad, and a six-man headquarters. The headquarters consists of a platoon leader (PL; usually a first lieutenant, 1LT), a platoon sergeant (PSG, usually a sergeant first class, SFC, E-7), a radio-telephone operator (RTO), a platoon forward observer (FO), the FO's RTO, and the platoon medic. Each squad is led by a sergeant, who is usually a staff sergeant (SSG, E-6). The rifle squads each consist of two fire teams and a squad leader, while the weapons squad consists of two medium machine gun teams, two close combat missile teams, and a squad leader. A typical infantry company consists of 3 rifle platoons and a 4th platoon known as a weapons platoon. The weapons platoon typically provides heavy weapons support to the company and includes mortar, anti-armor and heavy machine guns organically.

==== Marine Corps ====
In the United States Marine Corps, infantry rifle platoons nominally (per TO&E) consist of 43 Marines and are led by a platoon commander, usually a second lieutenant (O-1), assisted by a platoon sergeant, a staff sergeant (E-6). The platoon headquarters also includes a platoon guide, a sergeant (E-5), who serves as the assistant platoon sergeant, and a messenger (private or private first class). Rifle platoons consist of three rifle squads of 13 men each, led by a sergeant (E-5). In the attack (especially if part of the assault echelon) or in a deliberate defense, rifle platoons are usually augmented with a two-man mortar forward observer team and are often reinforced with a seven-man machinegun squad and/or a four-man assault weapons squad from the infantry company's weapons platoon.

An infantry rifle company (3 per infantry battalion) has a weapons platoon. The infantry battalion consists of a headquarters and support company (H&S), three rifle companies, and one weapons company. The weapons company platoon is usually led by a first lieutenant (O-2) and a gunnery sergeant (E-7) because of the generally larger number of Marines (up to 69 in the 81mm mortar platoon) in these platoons (the heavy machine gun platoon being the exception with only 28 members) and the more complex weapon systems employed. A rifle company weapons platoon has a 60mm mortar section of 13 Marines with three M224 LWCMS 60mm mortar squads, an assault section of 13 Marines and six SMAW rocket launchers divided into three squads of two teams each, and a medium machine gun section of 22 Marines and six M240G general-purpose machine guns divided into three squads of two teams each. The infantry battalion weapons company consists of three heavy weapons platoons: 81mm mortar platoon (referred to as "81s platoon or 81s"), heavy machine gun platoon (.50cal HMG and 40mm AGL), and anti armor platoon (Javelin missile and antitank TOW missile launchers). Each of these three platoons is divided into sections. Three sections of two squads each in the heavy machine gun platoon, two sections of four squads each in the 81mm mortar platoon, one section of two squads with four teams each in the Javelin missile section, and one section of four squads with two teams each in the antitank TOW missile section. Marine rifle or weapons platoons would also have from one to four Navy hospital corpsmen assigned along with the Marines.

Platoons are also used in reconnaissance, light armored reconnaissance (scout dismounts), combat engineer, law enforcement (i.e., military police), Marine Security Force Regiment (MSFR), and Fleet Antiterrorism Security Team (FAST) companies. In armored vehicle units, platoons consist of sections containing two or three vehicles and their crews:

- tank and light armored reconnaissance platoons consist of two sections, each containing two tanks/light armored vehicles and crews
- assault amphibian vehicle (AAV) platoons consist of four sections, each containing three AAVs and crews (Per T/O 4652M.)
- combat engineer assault breacher sections consist of two CEV assault breacher vehicles and crews

In low altitude air defense (LAAD) batteries, the firing platoons consist of three sections, each consisting of a section leader and five two-man Stinger missile teams. In artillery batteries, the firing platoon consists of six artillery sections, each containing one gun with its crew and prime mover (i.e., a truck to tow the artillery piece and transport the gun crew and baggage).

==== Air Force ====
The United States Air Force has a similarly sized and configured unit called a flight. A flight usually ranges from a dozen people to over a hundred, or typically four aircraft. The typical flight commander is a captain. The typical flight chief is a master sergeant. Letter designations can be used, such as Alpha Flight, Bravo Flight, etc.

== See also ==
- Military organization
- Platoon, a film
