= Trooper (rank) =

Enlisted military rank

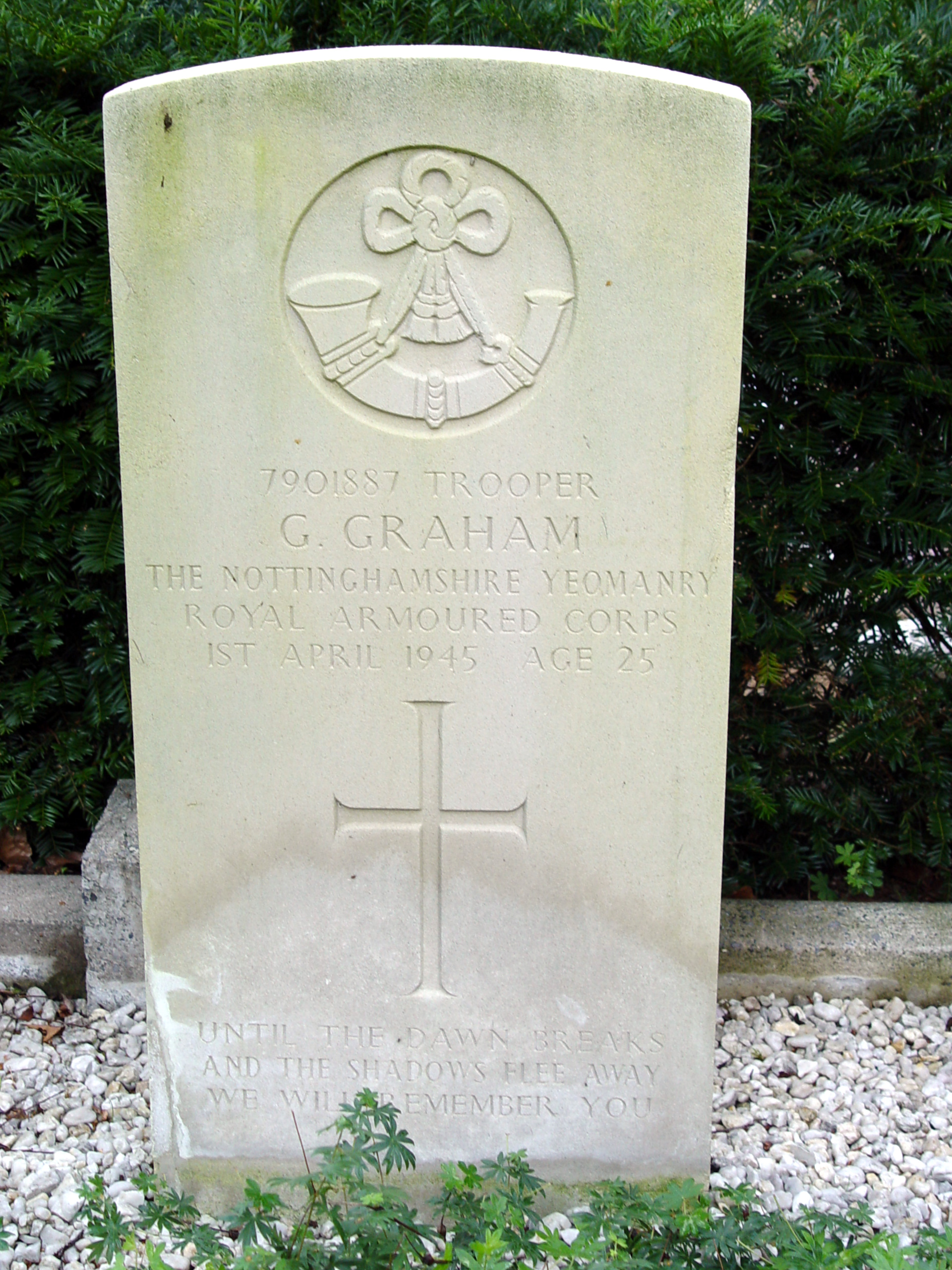
Gravestone of Trooper G. Graham, Nottinghamshire Yeomanry.

Trooper (abbr. Tpr) from the French "troupier" is the equivalent rank to private in a regiment with a cavalry tradition in the British Army and many other Commonwealth armies, including those of Australia, Canada, South Africa and New Zealand; it is also used by the Irish Army.

In the British Army the Royal Tank Regiment, although not a former cavalry unit also uses the term Trooper as do the Special Air Service and Honourable Artillery Company. Airtrooper (Atpr) is used in the Army Air Corps.

Cavalry units are organized into squadrons, further divided into troops, hence a trooper is a member of a troop. "Trooper" can also be used colloquially to mean any cavalry soldier (although not usually an officer).

In the United States Cavalry and airborne forces, "trooper" is a colloquialism that has traditionally been used not as a rank, but rather as a general term for any enlisted soldier.

Cavalry Troopers are generally considered to be socially a cut above other soldiers. This distinction stems from the days when cavalry needed to supply their own horses and equipment, and so would need to be reasonably wealthy and a gentleman of sorts. In addition cavalry regiments were seen to be relatively fashionable and dashing, often having colourful or even garish uniforms.

In the United States many states have a state branch of law enforcement that serves as a highway patrol. Many state highway patrols refer to their officers as troopers.

== See also ==
- Sowar
- Knight
