= Private (rank) =

Lowest enlisted rank in many armed forces

A private is a soldier, usually with the lowest rank in many armies. Soldiers with the rank of private may be conscripts or they may be professional (career) soldiers.

The term derives from the term "private soldier". "Private" comes from the Latin word privus or perhaps privo that meant an individual person and later an individual without an office.

== Asia ==
=== Indonesia ===
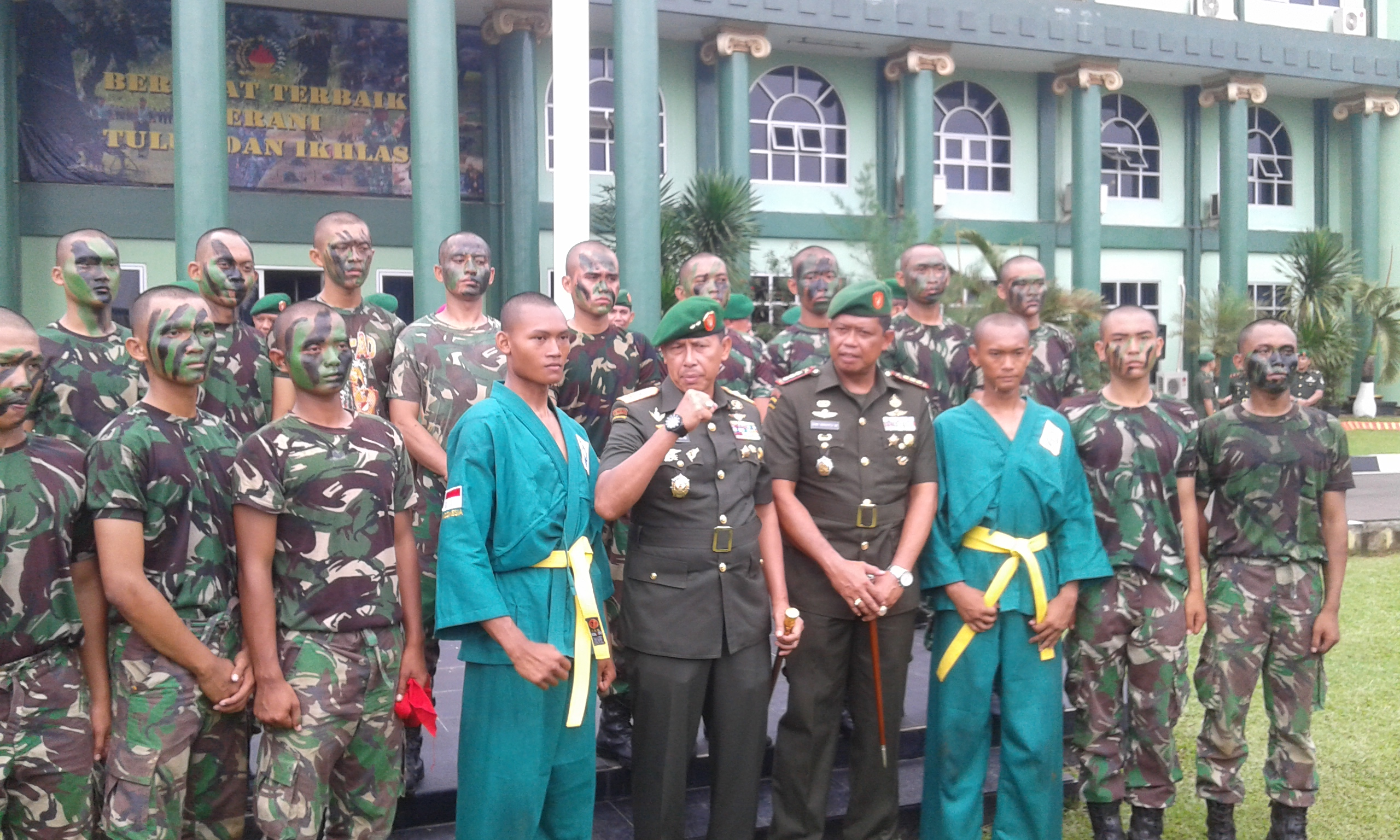
Indonesian Army privates pose with two officers

In Indonesia, this rank is referred to as Prajurit (lit. 'soldier'), which is the lowest rank in the Indonesian National Armed Forces. In the Indonesian Army, Indonesian Marine Corps, and Indonesian Air Force, "Private" has three levels, which are: Private Second Class (Prajurit Dua), Private First Class (Prajurit Satu), and Chief Private (Prajurit Kepala). After this rank, the next promotion is to Corporal.

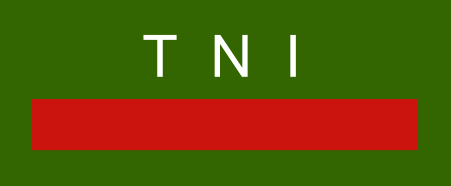
Private Second Class (Prajurit Dua)

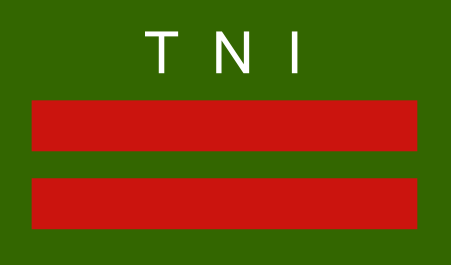
Private First Class (Prajurit Satu)

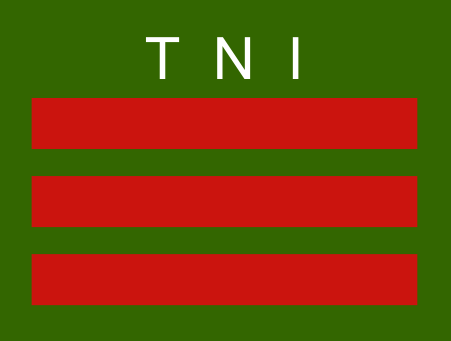
Chief Private (Prajurit Kepala)

=== People's Republic of China ===
In the People's Liberation Army of the People's Republic of China, Privates and Privates First Class are typically conscripted soldiers serving for a two-year period; conscripts who volunteer to continue beyond this period may become professional soldiers: "After the end of induction training, conscripts are awarded the rank of private; in their second year they become privates first class. At the end of two years, conscripts may be demobilized or, if they volunteer, they may be selected to become NCOs. They can also attend a military academy to become officers after passing a test. In effect, the two-year conscription period is a probation period."

=== Philippines ===
In the Armed Forces of the Philippines, the rank of Private is the lowest enlisted personnel rank. It is currently being used by the Philippine Army and the Philippine Marine Corps. It stands below the rank of Private first class. It is equivalent to the Airman of the Air Force and the Apprentice Seaman of the Navy and Coast Guard.

Private insignia
Philippine Army

Private insignia
Philippine Marine Corps

=== Singapore ===
Once recruits complete their Basic Military Training (BMT) or Basic Rescue Training (BRT), they attain the rank of private (PTE). Privates do not wear ranks on their rank holder. PTEs who perform well are promoted to the rank of Lance Corporal (LCP). The PFC rank is rarely awarded today by the Singapore Armed Forces. All private enlistees can be promoted directly to lance corporal should they meet the minimum qualifying requirements, conduct appraisal and work performance. Recruits who did not complete BMT but did complete two years of National Service will be promoted to private.

== Commonwealth ==
=== Australia ===
In the Australian Army, a soldier of private rank wears no insignia. Like its British Army counterpart, the Australian Army rank of private (PTE) has other titles, depending on the corps and specification of that service member.

The following alternative ranks are available for privates in the Australian Army:

- Craftsman (CFN) – Royal Australian Electrical and Mechanical Engineers
- Gunner (GNR) – Royal Australian Artillery
- Sapper (SPR) – Royal Australian Engineers;
- Musician (MUSN) – Australian Army Band Corps
- Signalman (SIG) – Royal Australian Corps of Signals
- Trooper (TPR) – Royal Australian Armoured Corps, Australian Army Aviation and the Australian Special Air Service Regiment
- Patrolman - Regional Force Surveillance Units

=== New Zealand ===
In the New Zealand Army, a soldier of private rank wears no insignia. Like its British Army counterpart, the New Zealand Army rank of private (PTE) has other titles, depending on the corps and specification of that service member.

The following alternative ranks are available for privates in the New Zealand Army:

- Gunner (GNR) - Royal Regiment of New Zealand Artillery
- Trooper (TPR) - Royal New Zealand Armoured Corps and the New Zealand Special Air Service
- Sapper (SPR) - The Corps of Royal New Zealand Engineers
- Signaller (SIG) - Royal New Zealand Corps of Signals

=== Canada ===
In the Canadian Army, the term private refers to the two lowest non-commissioned member ranks.

The lowest rank is Private (Recruit). Canadian Army recruits hold this rank upon enrolment until they complete the requirements of the next rank, a holder of this rank wears a blank rank insignia that reads "Canada" because they are technically considered to generically belong to the Canadian Armed Forces rather than a specific regiment.

The next rank is Private (Basic), is equivalent to a NATO OR-1, and a holder of this rank still wears blank rank insignia and a blank rank legend with the abbreviation of their regiment at the bottom. Canadian Army recruits hold this rank upon completion of Basic training until they complete the requirements of the next rank.

The rank of Private (Trained), equivalent to a NATO OR-2, is achieved following successful completion of the applicable trades training (QL3/DP1) and 30 months of service. A holder of this rank wears rank insignia consisting of a single chevron.

The equivalent ranks in the Royal Canadian Navy are Sailor 3rd Class (for Private (Basic)), and Sailor 2nd Class (for Private (Trained)).

The equivalent ranks in the Royal Canadian Air Force are Aviator (Basic), and Aviator (Trained)

Canadian Army Privates (Trained) may be known by other titles, depending on their personnel branch and their regiment's tradition:

- Trooper – armoured crewmen in the Royal Canadian Armoured Corps
- Gunner – artillerymen in the Royal Regiment of Canadian Artillery
- Sapper – combat engineers in the Corps of Royal Canadian Engineers
- Signaller (not usually observed) – communicator research, cyber, and signal operators, and information systems, line, and signal technicians in the Royal Canadian Corps of Signals
- Craftsman (not usually observed) – electronic-optronic, materials, vehicle, and weapons technicians in the Corps of Royal Canadian Electrical and Mechanical Engineers
- Guardsman – Royal Canadian Infantry Corps (RCIC) members of foot guard regiments
- Fusilier – RCIC members of fusilier regiments
- Rifleman – RCIC members of rifle regiments

=== South Africa ===
In the South African Army the lowest enlisted rank is Private. Privates do not wear insignia on their uniforms. In the different corps it is known with different titles.

- Rifleman (Rfn) - South African Infantry Corps
- Signalman (Sgn) - South African Signal Corps
- Gunner (Gnr) - South African Armour Corps and South African Artillery Corps
- Sapper (Spr) - South African Engineer Corps

=== United Kingdom ===
In the British Army, a private (Pte) equates to both OR-1 and OR-2 on the NATO scale, although there is no difference in rank. Privates wear no insignia. Many regiments and corps use other distinctive and descriptive names instead of private, some of these ranks have been used for centuries; others are less than 100 years old. In the contemporary British Armed Forces, the army rank of private is broadly equivalent to able seaman in the Royal Navy, aircraftman, leading aircraftman and senior aircraftman in the Royal Air Force, and marine (Mne) or bandsman, as appropriate equivalent rank in the Royal Marines. In the Boys' Brigade the rank of private is used when a boy moves from the junior section to the company section.

Distinctive equivalents for private include:

- Airtrooper (AirTpr) – Army Air Corps
- Bugler (Bgr) – buglers in The Rifles and formerly also in other Rifle regiments
- Craftsman (Cfn) – Royal Electrical and Mechanical Engineers (women as well as men use this rank)
- Drummer (Dmr) – drummers in infantry regiments
- Fusilier (Fus) – Fusilier regiments
- Gunner (Gnr) – Royal Artillery
- Guardsman (Gdsm) – Foot Guards
- Highlander (Hldr) – The Highlanders
- Kingsman (Kgn) – Duke of Lancaster's Regiment
- Musician (Musn) – military bands (formerly if a military band had a Bandmaster, they would be known as Bandsman (Bdsm))
- Piper (Ppr) – bagpipers in Scottish and Irish regiments
- Ranger (Rgr) – Royal Irish Regiment (also previously Royal Irish Rangers)
- Rifleman (Rfn) – Rifle regiments
- Sapper (Spr) – Royal Engineers
- Signaller (Sig) – Royal Corps of Signals (formerly called signalman)
- Trooper (Tpr) – cavalry (Household Cavalry, Royal Armoured Corps, Special Air Service and Honourable Artillery Company)
- Trumpeter (Tptr) – trumpeters in the Household Cavalry (and formerly in all cavalry regiments)

==== Royal Marines ====
In the Corps of Royal Marines, the rank structure follows that of British infantry regiments with the exception that the Royal Marines equivalent of private is Marine (Mne).

During the course of the First World War, some Royal Marines also took the rank of Sapper, this was usually found as part of the Royal Marine Divisional Engineers of the Royal Naval Division.

== Europe ==
=== Belgium ===
Upon enlistment to the Belgian army, one is given the rank of soldaat (Dutch) or soldat (French), whether one wishes to be a volunteer, non-commissioned officer or officer. Subsequent rank depends on the branch of the service: for example, at the Royal Military Academy (for officer training) one is soon promoted to the rank of korporaal (Dutch) or caporal (French) i.e. "corporal". The insignia is a simple black mark or the simplified version of the Royal Military Academy's coat of arms for candidate officers.

=== Finland ===
Military rank insignia of sotamies (private) of the Finnish Army and Air Force.

The Finnish equivalent rank is sotamies (literally "war man"), although since 1973 this has been purely a paper term as all infantry troopers were renamed as jääkäri troops, previously reserved only to mobile light infantry. As in the British army, the various branches use different names:

- Infantry – jääkäri ("jaeger")
- Military engineers – pioneeri ("pioneer")
- Signal corps – viestimies ("signaller")
- Cavalry – rakuuna ("dragoon")
- Artillery – tykkimies ("artilleryman")
- Tank corps – panssarimies ("tankman")

In the Finnish Air Force, the basic rank is lentosotamies ("airman"). In the Finnish Navy, the basic rank is matruusi ("seaman") or tykkimies ("artilleryman") in the marine infantry.

Special corps troopers may be referred by their function or unit, such as kaartinjääkäri (Guards jaeger), panssarijääkäri (armored jaeger), laskuvarjojääkäri (paratroop jaeger), rajajääkäri (border jaeger) or rannikkojääkäri (coastal jaeger).

=== France ===
In the French army, soldat de seconde classe is the lowest military rank. This rank is also referred to as recrue ("recruit").

=== Hungary ===
The name of the lowest rank in the Hungarian army (Magyar Honvédség) is the honvéd which means "homeland defender". The word is also used informally for a soldier in general of any rank (i.e. "our honvéds" or an officer referred as a honvédtiszt, honvéd officer). This is because Hungarian military traditions are strictly defensive, despite the Hungarian army participating in offensives on foreign soil in both world wars. The word honvéd has been in use since the Hungarian Revolution of 1848. The term is not used for soldiers of foreign armies: a foreign soldier with no rank is called közlegény, literally "common lad" or "common man".

=== Ireland ===
2* private

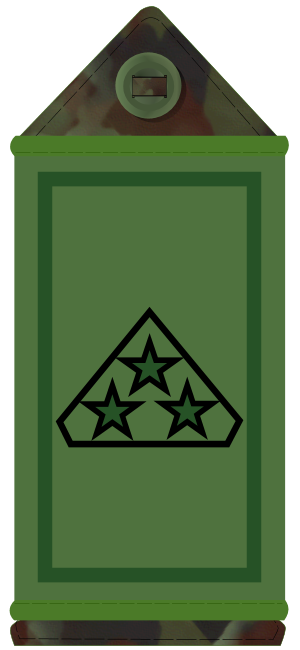
3* private

Private (Pte) (saighdiúr singil in Irish), is the lowest enlisted rank in the Irish Army. Soldiers enlist as recruits then undergo a basic course of instruction. There are three grades of private in the army. After basic training the soldier is upgraded (rather than promoted) from recruit to private 2 star (Pte 2*) (saighdiúr singil, 2 réalta). After more corps-specific training (usually lasting eight weeks) the soldier is upgraded to private 3 star (Pte 3*) (saighdiúr singil, 3 réalta). All are usually just addressed as "private", although before being upgraded, recruits may be addressed as "recruit".

In corps units, the rank designation changes. In the artillery, the rank is known as gunner (Gnr), but usually only after the completion of a gunners' course, and in the cavalry it is known as trooper (Tpr). Communications and Information Services privates are known as signalman or signalwoman. Medical orderlies are sometimes referred to as medic, although this can apply to privates and corporals.

=== Italy ===
In the Italian Army soldato is the lowest military rank. This rank is also referred to as recluta (meaning recruit). Soldato is the generic term for private. But in many specialized corps this term is never used, as a more specific, corp related, term is preferred. For instance the lowest rank in Alpine troops is alpino, and the lowest rank in the artillery is artigliere. In the air force this is ranked as aviere and in the navy as marinaio. While in the infantry is ranked as fante and in the mechanized infantry is ranked as carrista.

=== Netherlands ===
In the Royal Netherlands Army, the Landmacht, the equivalent ranks are soldaat (soldier), similar to the original French, with different classes:

- Soldaat der derde klasse (soldier/private 3rd class), for soldiers in Algemene Militaire Opleiding or AMO (General Military Training), with insignia.
- Soldaat der tweede klasse (soldier/private 2nd class), the basic infantry rank, an insignia single striped red band, obtained after AMO but before completion of Initiële Functie Opleiding or IFO (initial job training).
- Soldaat der eerste klasse (soldier/private 1st class), comparable to private first class, with an insignia with two neighbouring striped red bands, obtained automatically a year after completion of IFO.

Depending on where the soldaat serves, he may be deemed a kanonnier (gunner in the artillery), huzaar (hussar in the cavalry) or fuselier (rifleman in the rifles) as well as commando, jager (hunter) or rijder (rider). A soldaat can be promoted to korporaal (corporal).

=== Romania ===
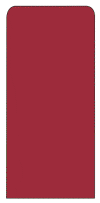
Shoulder insignia of a infantry or military music soldat

Soldat (soldier) is the lowest rank in the Romanian Land Forces, equivalent to the rank of private. It is the equivalent of jandarm (English: gendarme) in the Romanian Gendarmerie.

In day-to-day usage, the term soldat denotes every man or woman enrolled in the Romanian Armed Forces, irrespective of their actual rank or branch in which they activate.

=== Russia ===
Ground forces version

The beginning of military service in the Armed Forces of Russia for citizens who are not in the reserve of the Russian Armed Forces, called up for military service, is considered to be the day of assignment of the military rank - Private (Sailor).

The word "guards" is added before the military rank of a serviceman serving in a guards military unit, on a guards ship.

The words "justice" or "medical service" are added to the military rank of a serviceman or citizen in the reserve, who has a military registration speciality in a legal or medical profile, respectively.

The words "reserve" or "retired" are added to the military rank of a citizen in the reserve or retired, respectively.

In the category of military personnel of the ship composition of the Russian Navy, the rank of private corresponds to the ship military rank of sailor.

Students of military schools are called "cadets". During their training, they are awarded the military ranks of private or sailor, and in the event of successful completion of a military educational institution, they are immediately awarded the officer rank of junior lieutenant or lieutenant, depending on the school.

== United States ==
Private
- U.S. Army private E-2's insignia
- Country: United States
- Service branch: United States Army (USA); United States Marine Corps (USMC)
- Abbreviation: PV1 & PV2 (Note: PVT is also used as an abbreviation for both private ranks when pay grade need not be distinguished.) (USA); Pvt (USMC)
- Rank group: Enlisted
- NATO rank code: OR-1 (Pvt & PV1); OR-2 (PV2)
- Pay grade: E-1 (Pvt & PV1); E-2 (PV2)
- Next higher rank: Private first class
- Equivalent ranks: E-1; Seaman recruit (Navy and USCG); Airman basic (Air Force); Specialist 1 (USSF); E-2; Seaman apprentice (Navy and USCG); Airman (Air Force); Specialist 2 (USSF)

=== United States Army ===
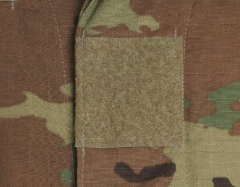
US Army OCP "Fuzzy"

In the United States Army, private is used for the two lowest enlisted ranks, just below private first class (E-3) or PFC. The lowest rank is "private (E-1)" or PV1, sometimes referred to as private recruit, but this rank can also be held by some soldiers after punishment through the Uniform Code of Military Justice, or by soldiers punished under the UCMJ as a demotion until they are discharged. A PV1 wears no uniform rank insignia; since the advent of the Army Combat Uniform (ACU), the slang term "fuzzy" has come into vogue, referring to the blank velcro patch area on the ACU where the rank would normally be placed.

The single "stripe" rank insignia of private was originally the insignia of a private first class (Grade 6) beginning in 1921, prior to which there was no insignia at all for privates. In May 1968, the Army created the current PFC rank and the single stripe moved to E-2.

The second rank, "private (E-2)" or PV2, wears a single chevron, known colloquially as "mosquito wings." In pay tables, the rank is listed as "private second class." Advancement to PV2 is automatic after six months' time in service, but may be shortened to four months by a waiver. A person who has earned the Eagle Scout award or the Gold Award or has completed at least two years of JROTC may enlist at any time at the rank of PV2.

In November 2025, Secretary of Defense Pete Hegseth proposed eliminating the promotion for Eagle Scouts who join the Army (and other services) due to the lack of "masculine values."

The third rank is private first class or "PFC", which is designated by an arc or "rocker" under the chevron. The term of address "Private" may be properly applied to any Army soldier E-1 (PV1) to E-3 (PFC). The abbreviation "PVT" may be used whenever the specific grade of private is immaterial (such as in tables of organization and equipment).

=== United States Marine Corps ===
In the United States Marine Corps, private (Pvt) refers only to the lowest enlisted rank, also known as a "boot", just below private first class. A Marine Corps private wears no insignia on their uniform and is sometimes described as having a "slick sleeve" for this reason. Most new, non-officer marines (a.k.a. "boots" or "non-rates") begin their military career as privates. In the Marine Corps, privates are addressed as "Private" to differentiate them from Private First Class Marines who are often called PFCs.

== See also ==
- List of comparative military ranks
