= Sergeant =

Rank in many uniformed organizations

Sergeant (Sgt) is a rank in use by the armed forces of many countries. It is also a police rank in some police services. The alternative spelling, serjeant, is used in The Rifles and in other units that draw their heritage from the British light infantry. The word "sergeant" derives from the Latin serviens, 'one who serves', through the Old French term serjant.

In modern hierarchies the term sergeant refers to a non-commissioned officer positioned above the rank of corporal, or to a police officer immediately below a lieutenant in the United States, or below an inspector in the United Kingdom. In most armies, a sergeant commands a squad or a section. In Commonwealth armies, it is a more senior rank, corresponding roughly to a platoon second-in-command. In the United States Army, sergeant is a more junior rank corresponding to a fireteam leader or assistant squad-leader; while in the United States Marine Corps the rank is typically held by squad leaders.

More senior non-commissioned ranks often have titles with variations on "sergeant", for example: staff sergeant, gunnery sergeant, master sergeant, first sergeant, and sergeant major.

In many nations and services, the rank insignia for a sergeant consists of three chevrons.

== History ==
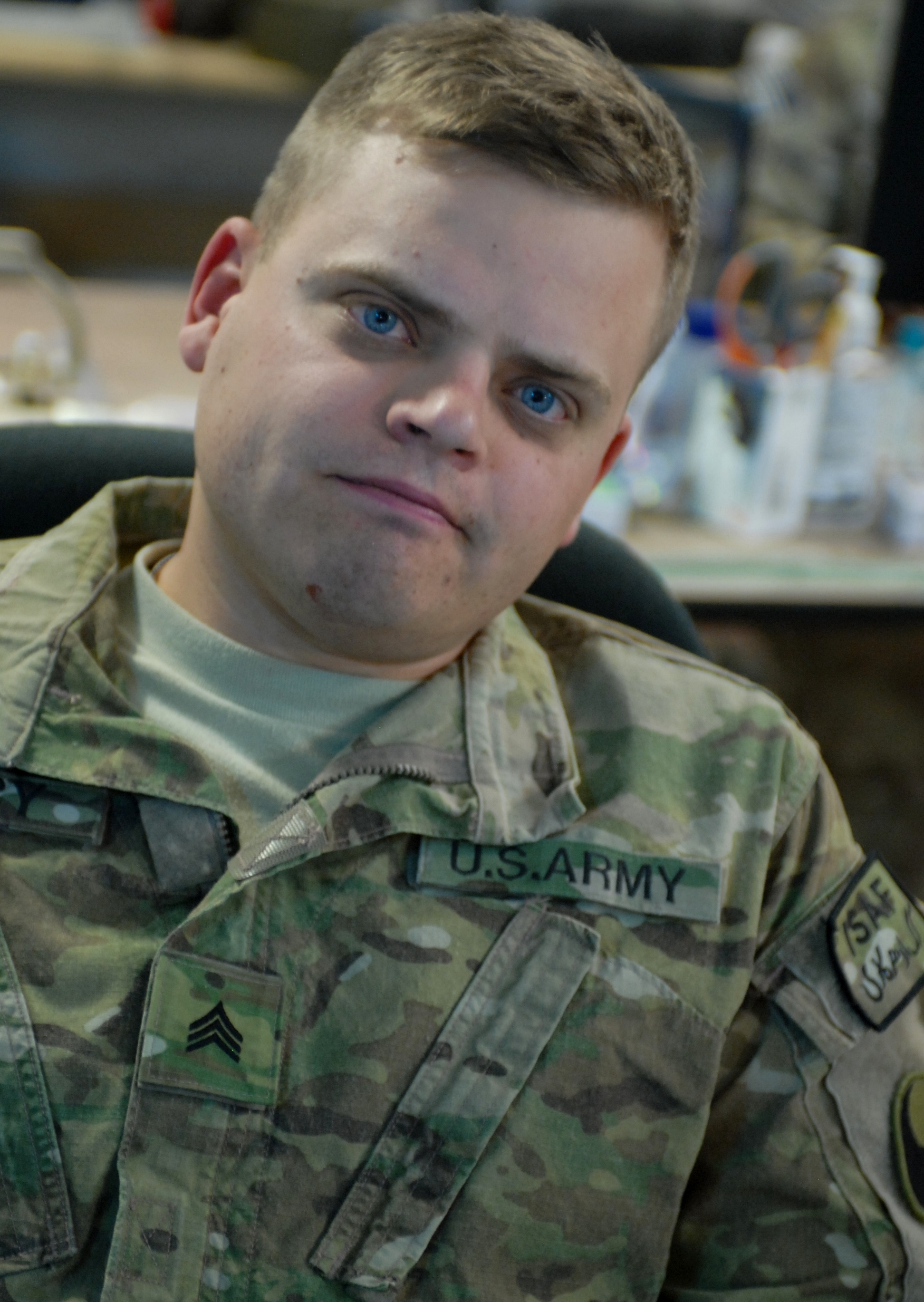
A sergeant of the United States Army's 29th Infantry Division, 2011

In medieval European usage, a sergeant was simply any attendant or officer with a protective duty. Any medieval knight or military order of knighthood might have "sergeants-at-arms", meaning servants able to fight if needed. The etymology of the term is from Anglo-French sergent, serjeant "servant, valet, court official, soldier", from Middle Latin servientem "servant, vassal, soldier".

Later, a "soldier sergeant" was a man of what would now be thought of as the "middle class", fulfilling a slightly junior role to the knight in the medieval hierarchy. Sergeants could fight either as heavy cavalry, light cavalry, or as trained professional infantry; either spearmen or crossbowmen. Most notable medieval mercenaries fell into the "sergeant" class, such as Flemish crossbowmen and spearmen, who were seen as reliable quality troops. The sergeant class was deemed to be 'worth half of a knight' in military value.

A specific kind of military sergeant was the serjeant-at-arms, one of a body of armed men retained by English lords and monarchs. The title is now given to an officer in modern legislative bodies who is charged with keeping order during meetings and, if necessary, forcibly removing disruptive members.

The term had also civilian applications quite distinct and different from the military sergeant, though sharing the etymological origin – for example the serjeant-at-law, historically an important and prestigious order of English lawyers.

== Types of sergeant ==
"Sergeant" is generally the lowest rank of sergeant, with individual military entities choosing some additional words to signify higher-ranking individuals. What terms are used, and what seniority they signify, is to a great extent dependent on the individual armed service. The term "sergeant" is also used in many appointment titles.

=== Ranks ===
- Chief sergeant
- Chief master sergeant
- Colour sergeant
- Command sergeant major
- Company sergeant
- First sergeant
- Second sergeant
- Third sergeant
- Flight sergeant
- Gunnery sergeant
- Master gunnery sergeant
- Master sergeant
- Senior master sergeant
- Lance sergeant
- Junior sergeant
- Senior sergeant
- Senior staff sergeant
- Sergeant first class
- Sergeant major
- Staff sergeant
- Station sergeant
- Technical sergeant

=== Appointments ===
- Academy sergeant major
- Band sergeant major
- Company quartermaster sergeant
- Company sergeant major
- Drill sergeant
- First sergeant
- Garrison sergeant major
- Pioneer sergeant
- Pipe sergeant
- Platoon sergeant
- Platoon sergeant major
- Provost sergeant
- Quartermaster sergeant instructor
- Recruiting sergeant
- Regimental quartermaster sergeant
- Regimental sergeant major
- Senior enlisted advisor
- Sergeant major instructor
- Sergeant pilot
- Serjeant-at-arms
- Squadron quartermaster sergeant
- Squadron sergeant major
- Staff sergeant major
- Troop sergeant major

== Current adaptations ==
In most non-naval military or paramilitary organizations, the various grades of sergeant are non-commissioned officers (NCOs) ranking above privates and corporals, and below warrant officers and commissioned officers. The responsibilities of a sergeant differ from army to army. There are usually several ranks of sergeant, each corresponding to greater experience and responsibility for the daily lives of the soldiers of larger units. In police forces, sergeants are usually team leaders in charge of an entire team of constables to senior constables at large stations, to being in charge of sectors involving several police stations. In country areas, sergeants are often in charge of an entire station and its constabulary. Senior sergeants are usually in specialist areas and are in charge of sergeants and thus act as middle management.

=== Australia ===
Sergeant (Sgt) is a rank in both the Australian Army and the Royal Australian Air Force. The ranks are equivalent to each other and the Royal Australian Navy rank of petty officer.

Although the rank insignia of the RAAF rank of flight sergeant (Flt Sgt) and the Australian Army rank of staff sergeant (SSgt) are identical, flight sergeant in fact outranks the rank of staff sergeant in the classification of rank equivalencies. The Australian Army rank of staff sergeant is now redundant and is no longer awarded, due to being outside the rank equivalencies and the next promotional rank is warrant officer class two. Chief petty officers and flight sergeants are not required to call a warrant officer class two "sir" in accordance with Australian Defence Force Regulations 1952 (Regulation 8).

The rank of sergeant exists in all Australian police forces and is of higher ranking than a constable or senior constable, but lower than an inspector.

The sergeant structure varies among state police forces, generally two sergeant ranks are commonly classed as non-commissioned officers:

- Sergeant (Sgt) (three chevrons); and
- Senior sergeant (Sen Sgt) (three chevrons, crown surmounted by a laurel leaf)

South Australia Police has the additional rank of brevet sergeant (two chevrons below an inverted arrow head) which is an authorization for a temporarily higher rank. A brevet sergeant is less senior than a sergeant.

New South Wales Police Force has the additional rank of incremental sergeant (three chevrons and a crown). This is an incremental progression, following an appointment as a sergeant for seven years. An incremental sergeant rank is less senior than a senior sergeant but is more senior than a sergeant.

Upon appointment as a sergeant or senior sergeant, the sergeant is given:

- A warrant of appointment under the commissioner's hand and seal.
- A navy blue backing (which replaces a light blue backing to the officer's police badge)
- A navy blue nameplate (which replaces a light blue nameplate)
- A silver chinstrap positioned above his peaked cap on his headdress, replacing a black chinstrap.

Within the New South Wales Police Force, a sergeant is a team leader or supervisory rank, whilst the rank of senior sergeant is a middle management rank with coordination responsibilities over human and physical resources.

All three sergeant ranks are informally referred to as "sergeant", or "sarge". However, at the New South Wales Police Academy, recruits must address all ranks of sergeants as "sergeant", and senior sergeants as "senior sergeant".

=== Canada ===
==== Army and Air Force ====
Sergeant (Sgt) (French: sergent or sgt) is an Army or Air Force non-commissioned officer rank of the Canadian Armed Forces. Its naval equivalent is petty officer 2nd class (French: maître de 2e classe). It is senior to the appointment of master corporal and its equivalent naval appointment, master seaman, and junior to warrant officer and its naval equivalent, petty officer 1st class. Sergeants and petty officers 2nd class are the only senior non-commissioned officers in the Canadian Armed Forces, as WOs, MWOs and CWOs are warrant officers, not senior NCOs in accordance with the Queens Regulations and Orders. Volume 1, Article 102 "Definitions".

In army units, sergeants usually serve as section commanders; they may often be called to fill positions normally held by warrant officers, such as platoon or troop warrant, company quartermaster sergeant, chief clerk, etc.

The rank insignia of a sergeant is a three-bar chevron, worn point down, surmounted by a maple leaf. Embroidered rank badges are worn in "CF gold" thread on rifle green Melton, stitched to the upper sleeves of the service dress jacket; as miniature gold metal and rifle-green enamel badges on the collars of the army dress shirt and army outerwear jackets; in "old-gold" thread on air force blue slip-ons on air force shirts, sweaters, and coats; and in a tan thread on CADPAT slip-ons (army) or dark blue thread on olive-drab slip-ons (air force) on the operational dress uniform.

Colour sergeant in the Canadian Armed Forces is not a rank of sergeant, but a warrant officer in one of the two Foot Guards regiments (the Governor General's Foot Guards and the Canadian Grenadier Guards). Likewise, a sergeant-major (including regimental sergeant-major) is not a sergeant rank, but an appointment held by a master warrant officer or chief warrant officer.

Sergeants generally mess and billet with warrant officers, master warrant officers, and chief warrant officers, and their naval counterparts, chief petty officers and petty officers. Their mess on military bases or installations is generally named the warrant officers' and sergeants' mess.

Historically, the rank of sergeant was severely downgraded after unification of the three services in 1968. An army sergeant before unification was generally employed in supervisory positions, such as the second in command of a platoon-sized unit (i.e. an infantry platoon sergeant, or troop sergeant in an armoured unit). After unification, sergeants were downgraded in status to section commander, a job previously held by corporals, and the former "platoon/troop sergeants" were replaced by "platoon/troop warrant officers".

==== Police ====
Police forces across Canada also use the rank of sergeant and staff sergeant for senior non-commissioned officers above the rank of constable or corporal. Except in the province of Quebec and in the Royal Canadian Mounted Police, the insignia for a police sergeant is three chevrons, worn point down. Staff sergeants rank above sergeants and are responsible for a unit or team within a station or division. The insignia for a staff sergeant is three chevrons, worn point down surmounted by a royal crown. In the Royal Canadian Mounted Police, the insignia for a sergeant is three chevrons, worn point down surmounted by a royal crown (which is the insignia of a staff sergeant in other Canadian police forces). The insignia of a staff sergeant in the Royal Canadian Mounted Police is four chevrons worn point up.

=== Denmark ===
In the Danish Defence, sergeants are typically squad (6-12 soldiers) or section commanders. The sergeants in the Danish forces also act as drill sergeants and platoon instructors, training both new soldiers in basic training, as well as professional soldiers. Sergeants with 1–2 years in the rank, who are in basic training units, are often second-in-command of the platoon.

In professional units, the role of second-in-command in the platoon is sometimes given to a very experienced sergeant, but in most cases will be a Senior sergeant (Danish: Oversergent), the rank above sergeant.

Sergeants in the Danish military are instructors in military drill, weapons, field-craft, small unit tactics, and physical training.

NATO code	OR-5		
NATO code	Army	Navy	Air force
Insignia			
Danish	Sergent	Sergent	Sergent
English translation	Sergeant	Petty officer	Sergeant

=== Finland ===
==== Army ====
Kersantti (Finnish language abrv. kers.) or Sergeant (swedish language abrv. Serg) is in Finnish Defence Forces the second lowest non-commissioned officer rank. The rank is carried by conscripts, reservists and professional soldiers. Conscripts and salaried soldiers with the rank of sergeant are distinguished from each other by their insignia. Conscripts and reservists have three chevrons, whereas salaried personnel have three chevrons and a sword in the insignia.

Sergeant is the highest non-commissioned officer rank that a conscript who has completed the junior NCO course (aliupseerikoulu in Finnish) can reach before entering the reserve. The lowest and most common non-commissioned officer rank is alikersantti (lit. 'lower sergeant'); see corporal.

Only a few non-commissioned officers in each conscript company reach the higher rank of full three-chevron kersantti. There's no difference between the 4-month squad leader training and service time of alikersantti and kersantti; all start their squad leader tour with the lower rank and the optional promotion is based on the superior's assessment of individual performance and intended duties in the wartime organization; special roles such as that of platoon sergeant or company first sergeant are typically reserved for kersantti and upwards.

A corporal can also obtain the rank of sergeant (and possibly above, the next rank being four-chevron ylikersantti, which is comparable to staff sergeant) by taking some military refresher courses while in reserve, or by enlisting to (short-term) professional service in the military.

=== France ===
==== Army ====
French sergeant ranks are used by the air force, engineers, infantry, Foreign Legion, Troupes de marine, communications, administrative service, and Gendarmerie mobile. Other branches of the army and gendarmerie use the equivalent ranks of maréchal des logis ("marshal of lodgings" in English) instead of sergeant ranks.

There were three sergeant ranks in France, although the most junior, contract sergeant, has been superseded by student sub-officer now that conscription has been suspended. When the army contained a large proportion of conscripts, contract sergeant was very common as a rank for conscripts considered to have leadership potential. In general the term sergeant was used for both contract sergeant and career sergeant. Contract sergeant was classified as the lowest sub-officer (Note: The French military, like many others, does not use the term "non-commissioned officer" but instead sous-officier, meaning "sub-officer" (compare to German unteroffizier).) rank, the rank below being chief corporal.

- Student sub-officer, élève sous-officier (formerly "contract sergeant", sergent sous contrat): One chevron, gold or silver. (Note: The color of the chevrons of the sergeant depends on his unit: the vast majority of infantry units use gold, but a few, such as the chasseurs alpins, use silver.)
  "Contract sergeant" was a rank used for junior sergeants, either conscripts or reservists. The rank insignia is used nowadays for students. After a certain amount of time, a student sub-officer is entitled to be addressed "sergeant".
- Sergeant, sergent (formerly "career sergeant", sergent de carrière): Two chevrons.
  Normal sergeant rank, though normally directly recruited from civilian life into the sub-officer ranks, so the rank implies less experience and higher academic requirements than for a commonwealth sergeant. As a typical rank for the command of a squad (typically eight soldiers), a tank, or a gun, this rank is roughly equivalent to a commonwealth corporal, a US Army staff sergeant, or a US Marine Corps sergeant.
- Principal sergeant, sergent-chef: Three chevrons.
  With long service, a sergeant's promotion to chief sergeant is automatic. Typically being a platoon second-in-command, the holder of this rank is therefore equivalent to a commonwealth sergeant or a US "sergeant first class". The next rank up is adjutant.

=== Germany ===
The Sergeant was introduced 1843 and was used until 1921, when the rank was changed to Unterfeldwebel. The current rank used in the Bundeswehr which is equal to an American/British sergeant is the rank of Unteroffizier.

=== Ireland ===
==== Army ====
Sergeant (Sgt) (sáirsint in Irish) is the second rank of non-commissioned officer within the Irish Army. The naval equivalent is petty officer.

The army rank insignia consists of three winged chevrons (or "stripes"). The service dress insignia consists of three wavy red chevrons 9 cm wide bordered in yellow. The main infantry role of a sergeant is as second-in-command of a platoon or commander of a fire support section of a weapons platoon, such as an anti-tank or mortar platoon. Another role is that of company clerk and instructor. There are higher ranks of company sergeant and company quartermaster sergeant. Artillery sergeants are usually assigned as detachment and section commanders, as well as in administrative roles. The difference in roles of sergeant and corporal in the artillery corps is not as clearly defined as in the infantry corps.

Sergeant is also the second rank of non-commissioned officer in the Irish Air Corps. Before 1994, the Air Corps was considered part of the army and wore army uniforms with distinct corps badges, but the same rank insignia. With the introduction of a unique Air Corps blue uniform in 1994, the same rank markings in a white colour were worn, before the introduction of a new three-chevron with wing rank marking. There are higher ranks of flight sergeant and flight quartermaster sergeant.

==== Police ====
Sergeant is the second rank in the Garda Síochána, above garda and below inspector.

Sergeants appointed as detectives use the rank title detective sergeant (DS). They do not outrank regular sergeants, the 'detective' prefix indicates that they are permanently allocated to detective duties.

=== Israel ===
==== Defense forces ====
In the Israel Defense Forces, soldiers are promoted from corporal to sergeant after approximately 18 months of service (16 for combatants), if they performed their duties appropriately during this time, and did not have disciplinary problems. Soldiers who take a commander's course may become sergeants earlier. Sergeants get a symbolic pay raise of 1.80 NIS.

The Hebrew name for the rank is samál originated as an acronym for סגן מחוץ למנין segen mi-khutz la-minyan ("supernumerary lieutenant") (inspired by the abbreviation "NCO"). Nowadays is no longer treated as an acronym or an abbreviation (in Hebrew).

==== Police ====
In the Israeli Police, sergeant is the third rank, coming after constable and corporal. Officers are promoted to this rank after a year as a corporal, or after 20 months of service in total. Excelling officers may be promoted to this rank (or any other rank) in up to 6 months instead of a year.

=== Russia ===
==== Armed Forces ====
Within the Russian Armed Forces, there are three ranks which are explicitly sergeant ranks: junior sergeant (младший сержант, mladshy serzhant), sergeant (сержант, serzhant) and senior sergeant (старший сержант, starshy serzhant). There is also a rank called "starshina" (старшина), which is often translated as "master sergeant". These ranks are inherited from the Soviet Union.

In the Soviet Army, most sergeants (with the exception of the aforementioned starshina) were not career non-commissioned officers but specially trained conscripts; the rank of starshina was reserved for career non-commissioned officers. In the modern Russian army, there are attempts to change this system and make most or all sergeants career non-commissioned officers; they are met with limited success.

==== Police ====
Unlike most police forces of the world, in the Russian police sergeant is a starting, entry-level rank. Ranks of "policeman" or "senior policeman" are not used in Russia (the rank of "private of police" technically exists but is rare, and most recruits become sergeants right away). It is divided into three grades the same way as the army sergeant rank.

=== Singapore ===
==== Singapore Armed Forces ====
In the Singapore Armed Forces (SAF), there are five different grades of sergeant: third sergeant (3SG), second sergeant (2SG), first sergeant (1SG), staff sergeant (SSG), and master sergeant (MSG). Sergeants are considered specialists in the SAF. They are equivalent to the non-commissioned officers of other militaries.

Soldiers must complete their specialist course at the Specialist Cadet School, formerly known as the School of Infantry Specialists (SISPEC) or other training institutes before being promoted to third sergeant. While active duty national servicemen may be promoted to second sergeant, most personnel holding ranks above that are career soldiers.

Promotion from third sergeant to staff sergeant takes an average of 6 years, although many factors may cause a soldier's promotion to cease. These factors include failure to pass an annual physical fitness proficiency test, poor performance, or being charged for offenses.

Third sergeants are usually section commanders. They may also hold certain logistics or administrative posts such as company quartermaster sergeant. Second sergeants usually serve as platoon sergeants. First sergeants, staff sergeants, and master sergeants usually serve as company sergeant majors or administrative specialists at company level or higher.

==== Home Team ====
In the Singapore Police Force, Singapore Civil Defence Force, Singapore Prison Service and Immigration and Checkpoints Authority, the rank of sergeant lies between corporal and staff sergeant. Unlike most police forces in the world, the rank of sergeant has been changed since the late 1990s to an entry-level rank for Diploma/GCE "A" Level holders rather than a supervisory one.

==== Uniformed Youth Organisations ====
In the National Cadet Corps (NCC), the rank of third sergeant is below second sergeant, and above corporal. In the National Police Cadet Corps (NPCC) and the National Civil Defence Cadet Corps (NCDCC), the rank of sergeant is below staff sergeant, and above corporal. The rank of third sergeant and sergeant is held by cadets who have been appointed as non-commissioned officers by their units and thus have the power to command a squad.

NPCC and NCDCC sergeants wear a rank insignia of three pointed-down chevrons, with the letters 'NPCC' and 'NCDCC' located below the insignia, so as to differentiate NPCC and NCDCC cadets from Singapore Police Force and Singapore Civil Defence Force personnel respectively.

NCC third sergeants, second sergeants and first sergeants wear a rank insignia of three pointed-down chevrons, three pointed-down chevrons with one pointed-up chevron and three pointed-down chevrons with two pointed up-chevrons respectively, all with the letters 'NCC' located below the insignia, so as to differentiate NCC cadets from Singapore Armed Forces personnel.

In the St John Brigade (SJB), the rank of sergeant is above corporal and below staff sergeant. It is usually held by a non-commissioned officer.

=== Sweden ===
==== Army ====
In Sweden, sergeant is the most junior specialist officers rank above överfurir (a squad leader at skill level C (advanced)) and below översergeant. The Swedish rank system comprises two different types of officers, "specialist officers" (in other countries categorized as NCO:s) and "tactical officers". Though marked as OR 6 to OR 9, the Swedish rank system is that of a parallel system, and both officer categories mentioned above are recognized as officers according to the stipulations of commission, given by Swedish parliament. The rank of fanjunkare (OR 7) is superior to that of a second lieutenant (OF1). An individual officer can transition during a career between serving as a tactical officer or specialist officer, depending on what kind of role the officer are serving in and if one meets the qualifications to transfer. Specialist Officers ranking from OR7 to OR9 can be found in the same tactical and strategical levels as tactical officers, for example in staff positions on brigade and higher tactical levels, as advanced and skilled specialist or staff section commanders.

The creation of the specialist officers corps in 2008, meant that many former officers from OR 1b to OR 3 where commissioned to the ranks of OR 7 - OR 9.

From 1983 to 2008 there was only one professional officers corps within the Swedish armed forces (OF 1 to OF 9). All OR-ranks where hold by conscripts.

Historically, the role of the specialist officer, until 1972 categorised as "underofficer" in Sweden is reminiscent of that of a senior non-commissioned officer in Germany (Unteroffizier mit Portepee), hence there was a third stipulated "corps" of junior commanding ranks, that of the underbefäl, in direct translation "sub commanders" or "junior leader ranks", comprising the equivalents to the ranks of corporal (OR 4), furir (OR5) and överfurir (OR5b). This former "corps" (until 1983) was much like that of the senior gefreiter ranks within the different German-speaking armed forces. These ranks are today held by long serving and skilled professional or reservist soldiers, but are distinctly not specialist officers ranks.

In order to be appointed sergeant (until 2019 "first sergeant") in today's Swedish armed forces, it is required that the candidate have completed specialist officer training (1.5years).

=== United Kingdom ===
Sergeant
- Army, marine and RAF insignia
- Country: United Kingdom
- Service branch: British Army; Royal Marines; Royal Air Force
- Abbreviation: Sgt
- Rank group: Non-commissioned officer
- NATO rank code: OR-5/6
- Next higher rank: Staff/Colour sergeant; Chief technician
- Next lower rank: Corporal
- Equivalent ranks: Petty officer

==== Royal Marines and British Army ====
A sergeant in the Royal Marines and British Army wears three-point-down chevrons on their sleeve and usually serves as a platoon or troop sergeant, or in a specialist position. Staff sergeant (in technical units) or colour sergeant (in the Royal Marines and the infantry), is the next most senior rank, above which come warrant officers. The Household Cavalry use the rank of corporal of horse instead, the only regiments to preserve the old cavalry tradition of having corporals but not sergeants.

A lance-sergeant (LSgt) was formerly a corporal acting in the capacity of a sergeant. The appointment now survives only in the Foot Guards and Honourable Artillery Company, where it is awarded to all corporals. A lance-sergeant wears three chevrons and belongs to the sergeants' mess, however, functionally he remains a corporal rather than an acting sergeant (e.g., he will typically command a section). In the Household Cavalry, the equivalent appointment is lance-corporal of horse.

A sergeant in infantry regiments usually holds the appointment of "platoon sergeant" and is second in command of a platoon. In the Royal Marines a sergeant is sometimes the commander of a platoon-sized Close Combat Rifle Troop.

==== Royal Air Force ====
The Royal Air Force also has the rank of sergeant, wearing the same three chevrons. The rank lies between corporal and flight sergeant (or chief technician for technicians and musicians).

Between 1950 and 1964 in technical trades there was a rank of senior technician which was the equivalent of a sergeant. Senior technicians wore their chevrons point up.

On 1 July 1946, aircrew sergeants were re-designated as aircrew IV, III or II, replacing the chevrons with one, two or three six-pointed stars within a wreath and surmounted by an eagle. This was unpopular and in 1950 they returned to the old rank, but have worn an eagle above their chevrons ever since.

Sergeants of the Royal Flying Corps wore a four-bladed propeller above their chevrons.

The spelling "serjeant" was never used in the Royal Air Force.

==== Police ====
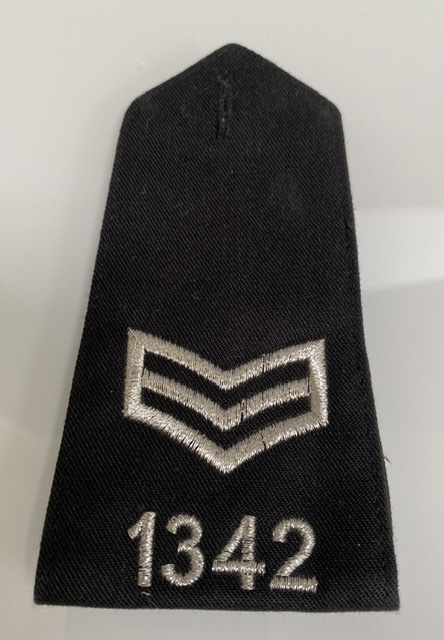
UK Police Patrol Sergeant epaulette

Within the British police, sergeant is the first supervisory rank. Sergeant is senior to the rank of constable, and junior to inspector. The rank is mostly operational, meaning that sergeants are directly concerned with day-to-day policing. Uniformed sergeants are often responsible for supervising a shift of constables and allocating duties to them. Prisoner-handling stations will also have one or more separate custody sergeants who are responsible for authorising and supervising the detention of arrested persons in accordance with the Police and Criminal Evidence Act, along with the daily management and effective running of the custody suite.

Detective sergeants (DS) are equal in rank to their uniformed counterparts; only the prefix 'detective' identifies them as having completed at least one of the various detective training courses authorising them to conduct and/or manage investigations into serious and/or complex crime. In British police services, not all officers deployed in plain clothes are detectives, and not all detectives are deployed within the CID. Thus, it is not unusual for detectives to supervise uniformed officers and vice versa.

Uniformed sergeants' shoulder insignia feature three down-pointed chevrons, above or below a personal identification number. Sergeants (and constables) in service with the Metropolitan Police, responsible for law enforcement in Greater London, have a "shoulder number", analogous to the collar number of regional forces, which is distinct from the warrant number on their warrant card. This is simply a management device to help order what is by far the largest police service in the UK. In the case of the Police Service of Northern Ireland, sergeants' chevrons point upwards. This is derived from the practices of the Royal Irish Constabulary, who were a mounted police force and followed a tradition of upward-pointing ranks.

Until the abolition of first-class detective sergeants in 1973, Metropolitan Police detective sergeants when initially promoted were officially known as second-class detective sergeants.

Unlike the military and allowing for regional variations, addressing a police sergeant as "sarge" is commonplace. Additionally, in some forces (especially the Metropolitan Police) sergeants are referred to as "skippers" and again allowing for regional variations, context and expectations it is not necessarily wrong for a constable to address their sergeant as "skip" or "skipper".

=== United States ===
Sergeant
- Army, Marine, and Space Force insignia
- Country: United States
- Service branch: United States Army; United States Marine Corps; United States Space Force
- Abbreviation: Sgt (USMC and USSF); SGT (Army)
- Rank group: Non-commissioned officer
- NATO rank code: OR-5
- Pay grade: E-5
- Formation: 1831
- Next higher rank: Staff sergeant (USA & USMC); Technical sergeant (USSF)
- Next lower rank: Corporal (USA & USMC); Specialist 4 (USSF)
- Equivalent ranks: Staff sergeant (USAF); Petty officer second class (USN & USCG)

==== History ====
The rank of sergeant was influenced from its use in the British Army and its colonial America regulars and militia of the several colonies. But it was the Blue Book of Baron Frederick William von Steuben, who General George Washington commissioned to bring discipline and improve the leadership of the Army in 1778, that established the role of the sergeant in the army. The sergeant was a non-commissioned officer rank immediately subordinate to the first sergeant and superior to corporal. The sergeant's role in the Blue Book was to inspect soldiers as well as be responsible for their training, health, appearance and camp sanitation.

Commonly, in the British Army and American colonial forces there was one sergeant for each officer with the sergeants serving as the senior non-commissioned officer of each section or squad (the terms were used somewhat interchangeably). Companies would sometimes be split into half-companies, or platoons, commanded by a lieutenant, for special duties. A typical British infantry regiment of the time was essentially coincident with a battalion, with eight "battalion" (or line infantry) companies consisting of men equipped with muskets who fought in a line, a light company with muskets and sometimes rifles for reconnaissance and skirmishing, a grenadier company equipped with muskets, and a small support staff. Some larger "strong" regiments did have multiple battalions, each commanded by a major or lieutenant colonel. The regiment frequently had a ceremonial colonel-in-chief who was often a general officer or other dignitary, with day-to-day responsibility exercised by a colonel commandant, who held the rank of brigadier general (in more elite regiments) or colonel. The colonel commandant personally commanded one of the companies, in addition to having responsibility for the regiment, and had his own sergeant. While corporals and lance-corporals could be removed by order of the regimental commander, a sergeant could only be reduced in rank by a court-martial.

In British Army and its colonial American forces, infantry companies usually had three officers (a captain, lieutenant, the now obsolete rank of ensign, later second lieutenant) and three sergeants, with the sergeants' primary role in combat being to protect the officers, while any supernumerary officers assigned to the regiment often had a corporal as their bodyguard instead. Several higher ranks of sergeant existed, including the staff sergeant who was appointed over the other sergeants in the company, and the "sergeant major", an informal designation for the senior-most sergeant in the colonel's company, which was later formalized as a separate rank the British Army in 1797.

In battle formation, the line companies were marched into formation in three ranks consisting of the "rank and file" (i.e., the corporals and privates), also referred to as the "bayonet strength", in order to present volley fire by rank or massed bayonets for assault or defense, with each sergeant marching with a spontoon or half-pike, which was also frequently born by officers of this period. The sergeants played less of a leadership role in combat than in modern forces, as the massed company was under the direct control of the officers, but the sergeant aided the officer by repeating commands, and by using his spontoon to signal, align the ranks, and ensure that their muskets were properly leveled. When a soldier was sentenced to lashing by company punishment or by court martial, the sergeants' spontoons would be bound together in a triangle frame to which the unfortunate soldier could be tied and lashed. Spontoons driven into the ground were also used as braces for stacking arms when not in use, one of the many tasks in which the men would frequently be supervised by a non-commissioned officer when not in combat. Many of these practices would persist in the Continental Army even as it began to adopt Prussian or French organization and drill.

Beginning in 1775, the Thirteen Colonies' Continental Army began to organize under the Continental European (i.e., Prussian-French) model, which in addition to organizing infantry companies into two platoons and forming each platoon into two ranks by section/squad, vice the three ranks of the British model, gave a more direct leadership role to sergeants by assigning two sergeants to each platoon as section/squad leaders. Sergeants began to transition from serving as the battlefield bodyguards of aristocratic officers and disciplinarians into being combat leaders integral to the tactical situation. In 1781, a fifth sergeant was authorized in each company to serve as company first sergeant, although a separate grade of rank was not established until 1831. However, from 1775, each regiment/battalion (these two terms were also used interchangeable during this time period as mentioned above) was authorized a sergeant major and a quartermaster sergeant.

The rank was used by both the U.S. Army and the Confederate army during the American Civil War. The same rank insignia was used similarly by both armies. Both varied the color of the stripes by assigning red for artillery, yellow for cavalry, blue for infantry and later in the war, green for sharpshooters. Some militia units varied these colors even further and had other colors including black and red with gold piping for various units. The rank was just below first sergeant and just above corporal. They usually commanded a section of twenty men with two corporals under him. As the war progressed these men were often in command of platoons and even companies as the units were depleted of officers during combat.

While the number of sergeants (including the first sergeant) authorized in an infantry company fluctuated from three to five during various periods of history, by the United States Civil War it was relatively fixed at four sergeants, a first sergeant, and a company quartermaster sergeant (added in 1861). In 1898 the infantry company was expanded to three platoons, increasing the number of sergeants in each company to six, along with a first sergeant and a company quartermaster sergeant. In 1905, the company quartermaster sergeant was renamed as company supply sergeant and a mess sergeant was added to the company.

In 1917, the Army reorganized under the "square division" plan. The size of units from company up increased significantly and there were now four rifle platoons and 12 sergeants per company, along with three "staff" NCOs (first sergeant, supply sergeant, and mess sergeant). While there were still two sergeants assigned as section leaders in each platoon, a new position of "assistant to platoon commander" was filled by the senior ranking sergeant of the three assigned to assist the lieutenant in leading the unit.

The 1939 "triangular division" reorganization eliminated sections in rifle platoons. In 1940, rifle squad leaders, who had been corporals, became sergeants (with two staff sergeants – one as a platoon leader and the other as a platoon guide in the platoon headquarters; the lieutenant was still titled platoon commander), with three squads/sergeants per rifle platoon. In 1942, sergeants became assistant squad leaders, with staff sergeants as squad leaders (and a technical sergeant and a staff sergeant, as platoon leader and platoon guide, respectively, in the platoon headquarters).

In 1943 platoon leaders (technical sergeants) were re-designated as platoon sergeants, while platoon commanders (officers – usually second or first lieutenants) became platoon leaders, with only company and higher-level commanding officers known as a "commander". (Of note, while the U.S. Marine Corps followed the Army's lead in re-designating the senior NCO in a platoon from "assistant to platoon commander" to platoon leader and then as the platoon sergeant, the Marine Corps continues to style an officer commanding a platoon as "platoon commander".) In 1948, squad leaders again became sergeants (with corporals as assistant squad leaders) and finally, in 1958, sergeants became fire-team leaders under a staff sergeant as squad leader.

In 1958, as part of a rank restructuring, two pay grades and four ranks were added: sergeant (E-5) returned to its traditional three chevron insignia, E-6 became staff sergeant, which had been eliminated in 1948.

==== US Army ====
In the United States Army, although there are several ranks of sergeant, the lowest carries the title of sergeant. Sergeant (E-5) is the enlisted rank in the U.S. Army above specialist and corporal (E-4) and below staff sergeant (E-6), and is the second-lowest grade of non-commissioned officer. The rank was often nicknamed "buck sergeant" to distinguish it from other senior grades of sergeants. Sergeants in the infantry, for example, lead fire teams of four men. There are two fire teams in a nine-man rifle squad, which is led by a staff sergeant. Sergeants are normally section and team leaders and are a critical link in the NCO channel. These non-commissioned officers live and work with their soldiers every day and are responsible for their health, welfare and safety. These section and team leaders ensure that their soldiers meet standards in personal appearance and teach them to maintain and account for their individual and unit equipment and property. The NCO enforces standards and develops and trains soldiers daily in their military occupational specialty and unit mission.

The insignia of an army sergeant is three up-facing chevrons. This has been true since 1901, except during the Korean War era (1948-1956) when it was three chevrons and a rocker. Before 1901, the three chevrons were inverted or down-facing.

US Army Sergeant Insignia Evolution
1851-1872	1872-1901	1902-1942	1942-1948	1949-1956	1956-2006	2006-2020	2020-present

Drill sergeants are typically addressed as "drill sergeant" regardless of rank, though use of this term depends on post policy. When serving a tour as drill sergeant this is indicated by the traditional campaign hat. In late 1971, Headquarters, Continental Army Command (CONARC) received approval from the Chief of Staff of the Army for permission to include women in the Drill Sergeant Program. In February 1972, six Woman Army Corps (WAC) non-commissioned officers from Fort McClellan, Alabama, were enrolled in the Drill Sergeant Program, at Fort Jackson, South Carolina. Upon graduation, the women were authorized to wear the female drill sergeant campaign hat. Today, women drill sergeants are also referred to as "drill sergeant", regardless of their rank. Both men and women drill sergeants will always wear the drill sergeant badge indicating they completed the required training program at an authorized drill sergeant academy. The army drill sergeant badge appears on the right breast pocket.

==== United States Marine Corps ====
The United States Marine Corps has several ranks that include the title of "sergeant", the lowest of which is sergeant (E-5). Marine sergeants are the fifth enlisted rank in the U.S. Marine Corps, ranking above corporal (E-4) and below staff sergeant (E-6), and are often referred to as the "backbone of the Marine Corps."

Infantry sergeants typically serve as squad leaders in either a rifle or weapons platoon or as the platoon guide (i.e., assistant platoon sergeant) in a rifle platoon.

Once a Marine attains the rank of sergeant, promotions no longer derive from a composite and cutting score-based system; instead, they receive a Fitness Report, or FITREP (i.e., a formal written evaluation, grading attributes from appearance and bearing to leadership and technical proficiency).

In the Marine Corps, enlisted ranks above Staff Sergeant are referred to as staff non-commissioned officers, or SNCOs. These ranks, staff sergeant through sergeant major, are always referred to by their full rank and never merely as "sergeant".

Staff sergeant is usually the lowest enlisted rank that reports directly to an officer. In the infantry this would typically be as a rifle platoon sergeant or as a section leader in a weapons platoon (i.e., machine guns, mortars, anti-tank/assault weapons).

Infantry gunnery sergeants usually serve as platoon sergeants for weapons platoons before moving up to a company gunnery sergeant billet. This position is filled by an experienced gunnery sergeant who is typically in charge of coordinating operations, logistics, and individual training for a company-sized group of Marines (approximately 180 personnel). Owing to their involvement in the management of unit supply/re-supply the "Company Gunny" is colloquially known to be in charge of the "3 Bs": beans, bullets, and band-aids. Gunnery sergeants are commonly addressed as "gunny", but never officially. Use of this informality by subordinates is permitted solely at the rank holder's discretion.

Infantry master sergeants typically serve as the operations chief of a weapons company (in lieu of the Company Gunnery Sergeant located in the rifle companies) or as the assistant operations chief in the headquarters of an infantry regiment. Master sergeants are addressed as either "master sergeant" or "top" at the preference of the incumbent and dependent upon the commonly accepted practice within the MOS community. For example, in Intelligence (the 02 MOS field), use of "Top" is common; in the Infantry (the 03 MOS field) its use is nearly unheard of and aggressively discouraged.

First sergeants serve as the senior enlisted advisor (SEA) to a company or battery commander and are always addressed by their full rank title as "first sergeant". However, it is common for first sergeants to be referred to as "first shirt" by those under their command. Unlike "gunny" and even "top", a first sergeant is never addressed as "first shirt" directly.

Infantry master gunnery sergeants serve as the operations chief in the headquarters of an infantry battalion or higher level organization (viz., Marine Expeditionary Unit, regiment, Marine Expeditionary Brigade, division, Marine Expeditionary Force) and follow the same verbal address protocol as master sergeants but are commonly referred to as "master guns", or "master gunny".

Sergeants major serve as the SEA to a battalion or squadron, or higher level, commander, and are always addressed by their full rank title as "sergeant major".

The history of the rank of sergeant in the USMC roughly parallels that of the US Army until 1942. From 1775 until WWII the Marine Corps used essentially the same rank and organizational structure as its common British and colonial forebears with the Army, as well as the later Continental and U.S. Armies. In 1942, as the Army modified its triangular-division infantry organization to best fight in the European/North African/Middle Eastern theatre, the Marine Corps began modifying the triangular-division plan to best employ its amphibious-warfare doctrine in the Pacific Theatre. This meant that for the Corps, squad leaders would remain as sergeants and the rifle squad would be sub-divided into three 4-man fire teams, each led by a corporal.

==== United States Air Force ====
Old U.S. Air Force sergeant rank insignia.

When the United States Air Force was separated from the U.S. Army in 1947, sergeant became the second junior non-commissioned officer (NCO) grade (above Air Force corporal) of this newly created independent branch of the U.S. Armed Forces. The USAF sergeant (E-4) was equivalent to an Army corporal (since 1949) or Marine corporal (since 1958) and Navy/Coast Guard petty officer third class (since 1948), when additional enlisted grades below NCO level were implemented in these branches, moving up all enlisted ranks above for one pay grade each.

The USAF sergeant was replaced by airman first class (A1C) in April 1952, this E-4 grade being now an enlisted rank below NCO level. From then through October 1967, there was no rank titled "sergeant", though A1Cs were often called "sarge" or "sergeant" informally.

The title "sergeant", commonly and informally referred to as "buck sergeant", was used again beginning in October 1967 in the hope that the prestige of being an NCO would increase the re-enlistment rate. Thus the rank of airman first class lost its E-4 status, becoming an E-3.

From June 1976 sergeant and the newly approved rank senior airman (SrA) shared the same pay grade E-4, with sergeant as lowest NCO rank and SrA as most senior enlisted personnel grade. This schism ended in April 1991, with the last promotions to sergeant. The last NCO to hold the sergeant rank without being promoted to higher rank left the Air Force in 1998. Since then, senior airman has been the sole rank at E-4.

During the period when the E-4 grade was divided, senior airmen were promoted to sergeant and granted non-commissioned officer status after 12 months time in grade; this lateral promotion is no longer conferred and senior airmen compete directly for promotion to staff sergeant (E-5). From 1976 to 1991, senior airman rank insignia had a light blue subdued central star, as did lower ranks. Sergeants and higher had, and confine to have, a silver star.

In today's Air Force, the term sergeant refers to all Air Force non-commissioned officers from staff sergeant up to the rank of senior master sergeant (E-8). An airman who has achieved the rank of senior master sergeant (E-8) may also be referred to as "senior". An airman who has achieved the rank of chief master sergeant (E-9) is referred to as "chief". Those in the grade of staff sergeant and technical sergeant (E-6) are referred to as non-commissioned officers, while those in the grade of master sergeant (E-7) through chief master sergeant are referred to as senior non-commissioned officers.

==== US Space Force ====
On February 1, 2021, the United States Space Force established the rank of sergeant for the pay grade E-5, replacing the rank of staff sergeant used in the Air Force. This aligned the Space Force's E-5 grade with the Army and Marine Corps, in which sergeants hold the grade of E-5 and staff sergeants hold the grade of E-6. In the Air Force, staff sergeants hold the grade of E-5 and the prior rank of sergeant was a non-commissioned officer in the grade of E-4, equivalent to the U.S. Army's corporal. Sergeants rank above specialist 4 but below technical sergeant.

== NATO code ==
While the rank is used in a number of NATO countries, it is ranked differently depending on the country.

NATO code	Country	English equivalent	
NATO code	Country	UK	US
OR-6	Bulgaria, Canada, Spain	Sergeant	Staff sergeant
OR-5	Belgium, Denmark, France, Italy, Latvia, Lithuania, Luxembourg, Netherlands, Norway, Poland, Romania	Sergeant	Sergeant
OR-4	Estonia	Corporal	Corporal

== Gallery ==
=== Armed Forces ===
Sergent
(Arabic: رقيب, romanized: Raqib)
(Algerian Land Forces)

Sergeant
(Antigua and Barbuda Regiment)

Sargento
(Argentine Army)

ՍԵՐԺԱՆՏ
Serzhant
(Armenian Ground Forces)

Sergeant
(Australian Army)

Sergeant
(Bengali: সার্জেন্ট, romanized: Sārjēnṭa)
(Bangladesh Army)

Sergeant
(Barbados Regiment)

Сяржант
Siaržant
(Belarusian Ground Forces)

Sergeant
(Belgian Land Component)

Sergeant
(Belize Defence Force)

Sergent
(Benin Army)

Sergeant
(Botswana Ground Force)

Sarjan
(Royal Brunei Land Force)

Сержант
Serzhant
(Bulgarian Land Forces)

Sergent
(Burkina Faso Ground Forces)

Sergent
(Kirundi: Sereja)
(Burundi Army)

Sergent
(Cameroon Ground Forces)

Sergeant
(French: Sergent)
(Canadian Army)

Sargento
(Cape Verdean National Guard)

Sergent
(Central African Ground Forces)

Sergent
(Chadian Ground Forces)

Sergent
(Comorian Army)

Sergent
(Land Forces of the DR Congo)

Sergent
(Congolese Ground Forces)

Sergent
(Royal Danish Army)

Sergent
(Djiboutian Army)

Sargento
(Dominican Army)

Sargento
(Salvadoran Army)

Sarjento
(Army of Equatorial Guinea)

Seersant
(Estonian Land Forces)

Sergeant
(Fiji Infantry Regiment)

Kersantti
(Finnish Army)

Sergent
(French Army)

Sergent
(Gabonese Army)

Sergeant
(Gambian National Army)

Sergeant
(Ghana Army)

სერჟანტი
Serzhant’i
(Georgian Land Forces)

Sergent
(Guinea Ground Forces)

Sergeant
(Guyana Army)

Sergeant
(Irish: Sáirsint)
(Irish Army)

Sergente
(Italian Army)

Sergent
(Ivory Coast Ground Forces)

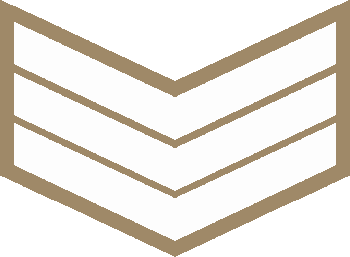
Sergeant
(Jamaican Army)

Cержант
Serjant
(Kazakh Ground Forces)

Sergeant
(Kenya Army)

Сержант
Serjant
(Kyrgyz Army)

Seržants
(Latvian Land Forces)

Sergeant
(Lesotho Army)

Sergeant
(Liberian Ground Forces)

Seržantas
(Lithuanian Land Force)

Sergent
(Luxembourg Army)

Sergent
(Madagascar Ground Forces)

Sarjan
(Malaysian Army)

Sergeant
(Malawi Army)

ސާރޖަންޓް
Saarjant
(Maldives National Defence Force)

Sergent
(Malian Army)

Sergeant
(Army of Malta)

Sergent
(Moldovan Ground Forces)

Sergent
(Royal Moroccan Army)

Sergeant
(Namibian Army)

Sergeant
(Royal Netherlands Army)

Sergeant
(New Zealand Army)

Sergent
(Niger Army)

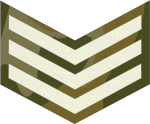
Sergeant
(Nigerian Army)

Sersjant
(Norwegian Army)

Sergeant
(Papua New Guinea Land Element)

Sergeant
(Philippine Army)

Sierżant
(Polish Land Forces)

Sergent
(Romanian Land Forces)

Сержа́нт
Serzhánt
(Russian Ground Forces)

Sergeant
(SKN Regiment)

Sergent
(Senegalese Army)

Sergeant
(Seychelles Infantry Unit)

Sergeant
(Sierra Leone Army)

Sargento
(Spanish Army)

Sergeant
(South African Army)

Sergeant
(Sri Lanka Army)

Sergeant
(Suriname Army)

Sergeant
(Swedish Army)

Sergeant
(Eswatini Army)

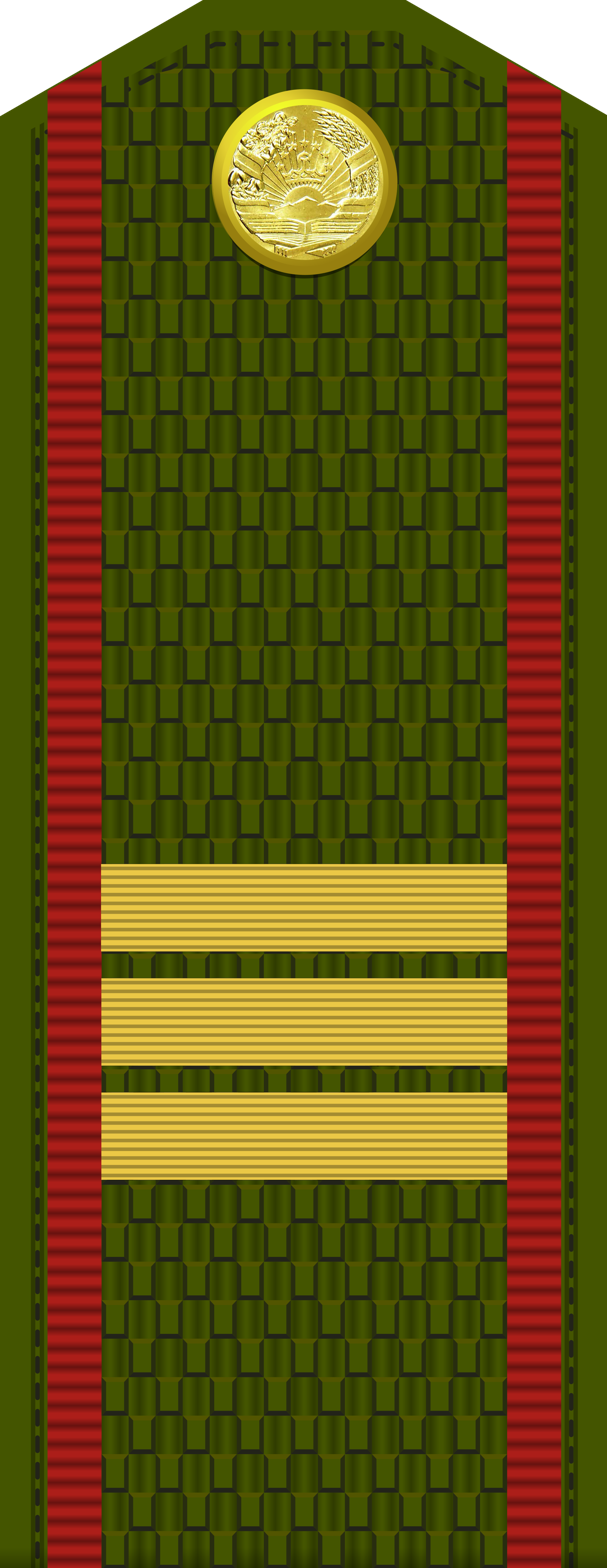
Сержант
Serzhant
(Tajik Ground Forces)

Sergeant
(Swahili: Sajenti)
(Tanzanian Army)

Sergent
(Togolese Army)

Sergeant
(Tongan Land Component)

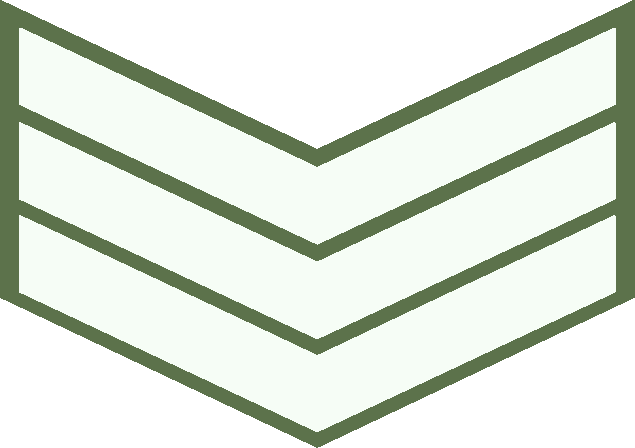
Sergeant
(Trinidad and Tobago Regiment)

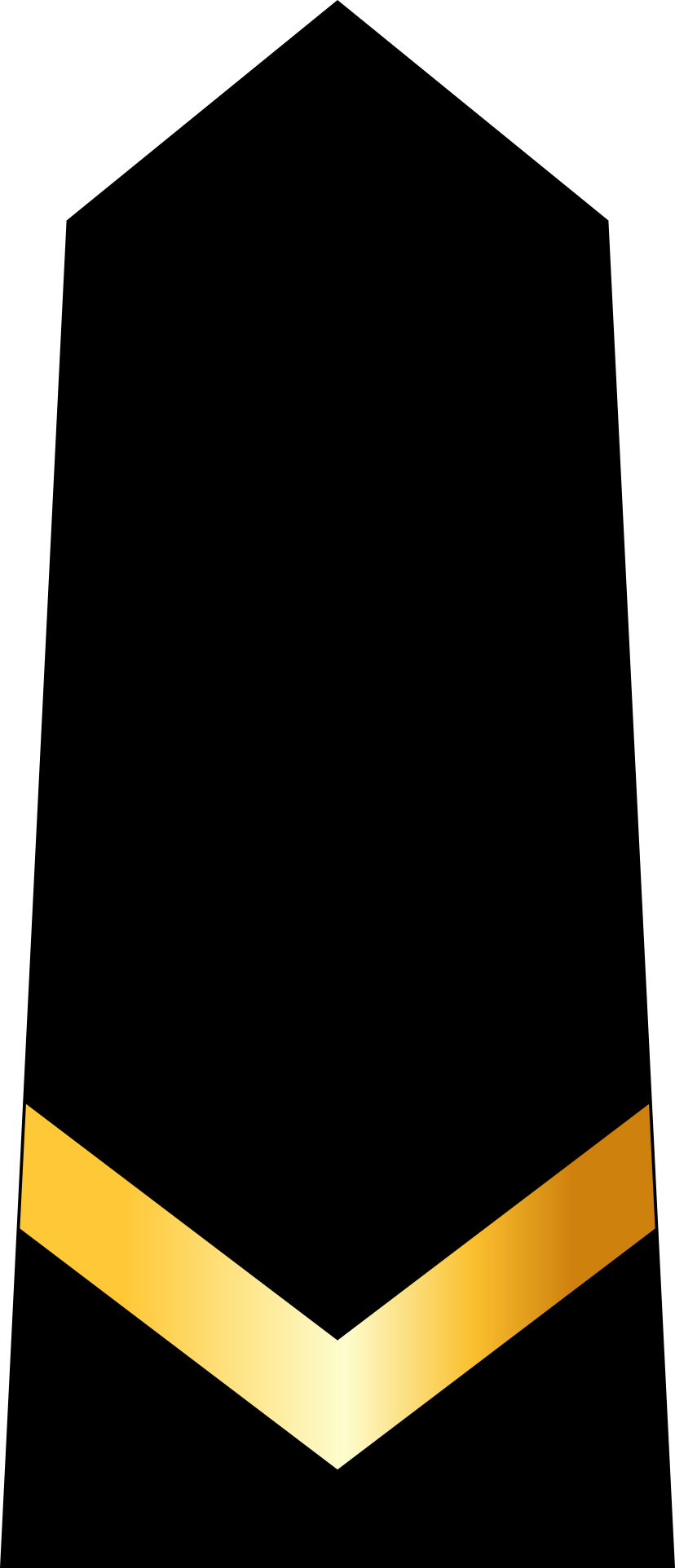
Sergent
(Arabic: عريف, romanized: Earif)
(Tunisian Army)

Seržant
(Turkmen Ground Forces)

Sergeant
(Ugandan Land Forces)

Сержант
Serzhant
(Ukrainian Ground Forces)

Sergeant
(British Army)

Sergeant
(United States Army)

Sargento
(National Army of Uruguay)

Sergeant
(Zambian Army)

Sergeant
(Zimbabwe National Army)

=== Police ===
New Zealand Police

Bangladesh Police

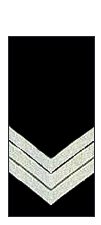
Victoria Police

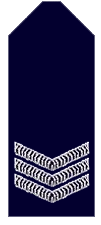
New South Wales Police Force

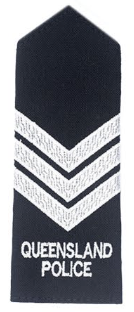
Queensland Police Service

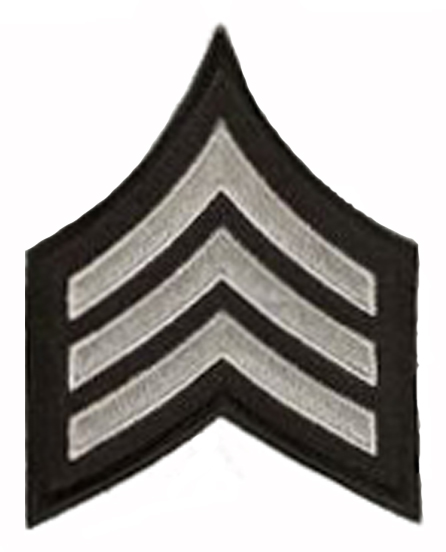
Los Angeles Police Department

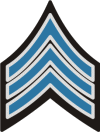
New York Police Department

Metropolitan Police

Royal Thai Police

Royal Canadian Mounted Police

Federal Police (Germany)

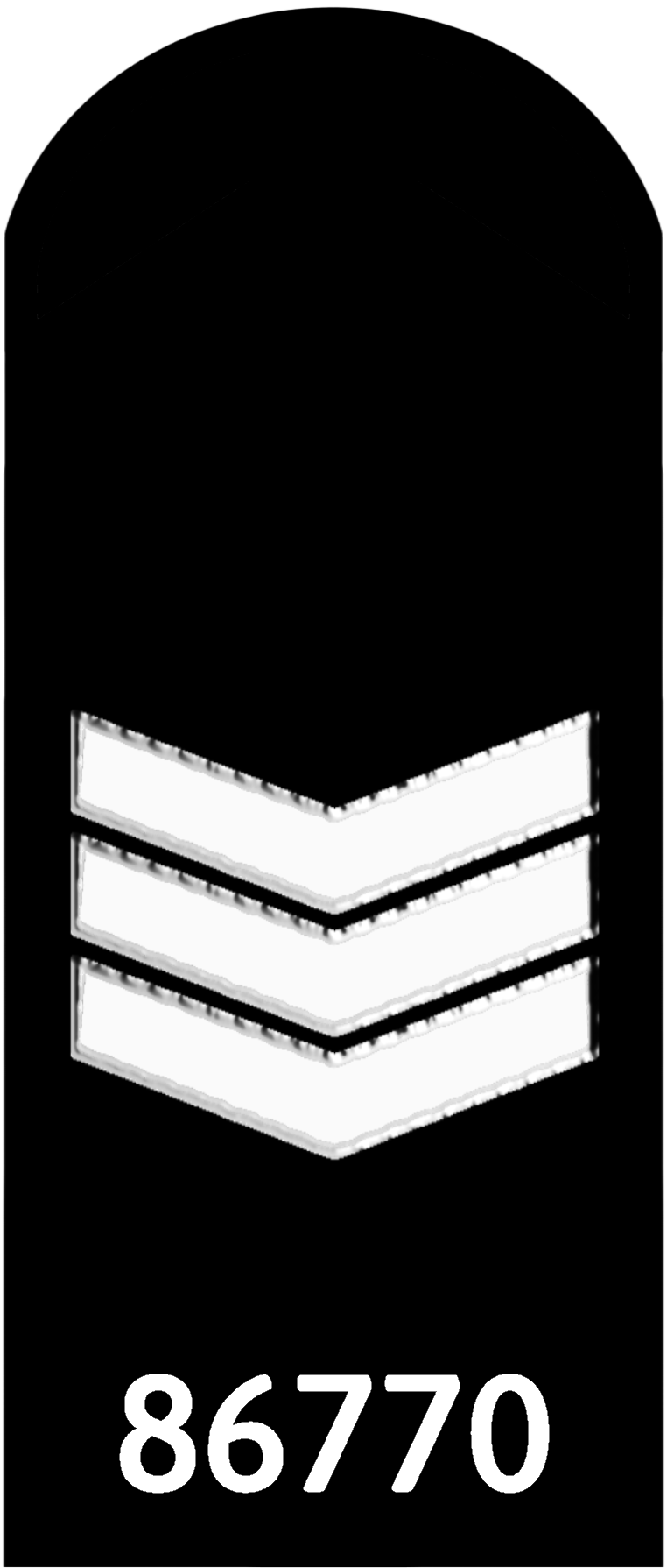
Hong Kong Police Force

Federal Police (Mexico)

Singapore Police Force

Police of Denmark

Police of Finland

Garda Síochána

Israel Police

Police of Russia

Swedish Police Authority

== See also ==
- Comparative military ranks
- Military rank
- Military unit
- Chevron (insignia)
