= St. John Ambulance Canada =

Medical organization

St. John Ambulance Ambulance Saint-Jean
- St. John Ambulance logo in Canada. The red maple leaf surrounding the Maltese Cross in a black roundel.
- Abbreviation: SJA
- Formation: 1883 in Canada 1888 by Royal Charter
- Type: Registered Charities in the Provinces and Territories
- Legal status: Incorporations under legislation in the Provinces and Territories
- Purpose: Health and safety training and volunteer community services
- Region served: Throughout Canada
- Members: 25,000 members in more than 300 communities
- Official language: English, French

St. John Ambulance in Canada, or SJA (French: Ambulance Saint-Jean Canada (ASJ), is a confederation of St John Ambulance Provincial and Territorial Councils under mandate by the "St John Councils Regulations 1975" of the Royal Charter, Statutes and Regulations of the Order of St John (1985). Each Council is governed by a Board of Directors under Provincial or Territorial incorporating legislation together with the St John Ambulance Priory in Canada, incorporated under the federal Canada Not For Profit Corporations Act (2012). The Priory provides support services to the Councils and manages the Order of St. John in Canada. The Councils deliver the mandate of training, product sales and volunteer community services and are responsible for their own governance, operations and management.

The mission of St. John Ambulance in Canada is to enable Canadians to improve their health, safety, and quality of life through training and community services. St John Ambulance in Canada has (collectively) close to 25,000 members in communities across Canada - over 2,500 instructors, over 12,000 volunteers and over 5,000 members of the Most Venerable Order of the Hospital of St John of Jerusalem.

== History ==
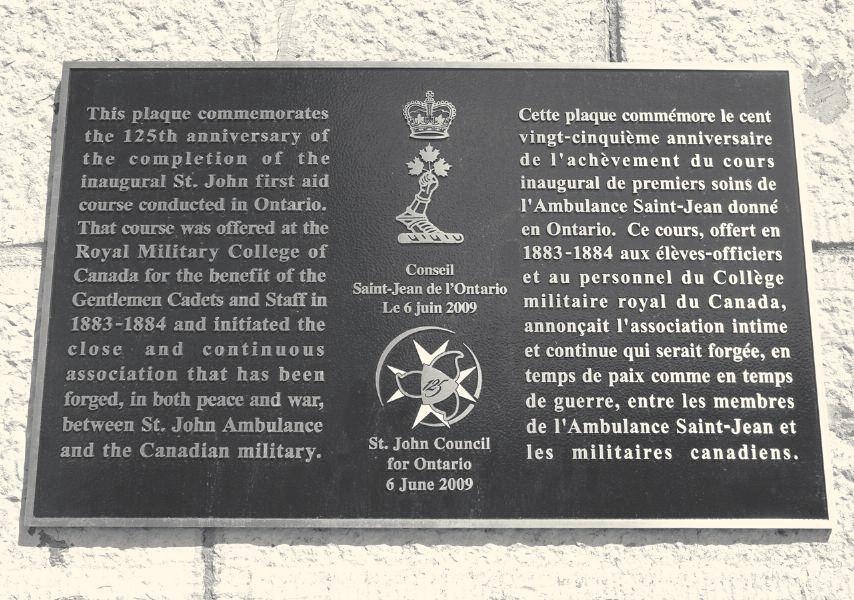
St. John Ambulance Canada plaque at Royal Military College of Canada

St. John Ambulance was established in Canada in 1883. Under this banner, volunteers from coast-to-coast carry out the humanitarian services of the Most Venerable Order of the Hospital of St. John of Jerusalem.

- 1883 First first aid course in Canada is conducted in Quebec City.
- 1888 – ‘Royal Charter of Incorporation’ of the Venerable Order of the Hospital of St John of Jerusalem of Queen Victoria (Sovereign Head of the Order)
- 1892 - 1898 Nursing and Training centres are established in Nova Scotia, Ontario, Alberta and Saskatchewan.
- 1907 - October 12 marks the opening of the first St. John Ambulance training centre for first aid in Vancouver, BC, in conjunction with CPR (Canadian Pacific Rail).
- 1907 – Updated Royal Charter of King Edward VII (Sovereign Head of the Order)
- 1909 First Canadian Ambulance division (No. 1 Forest City) is formed in London, ON.
- 1911 - June 24 marks the founding of the British Columbia, Alberta and Saskatchewan 'Councils' of St. John Ambulance in Canada (i.e. formal organizations associated with the Dominion Council of Canada operating in Ottawa as the Canadian Centre of the Grand Priory)
- 1912 First Canadian Nursing division (No. 1 Central) is formed in Toronto, ON.
- 1919 The Great Winnipeg Strike advocated (among other things) health and safety standards in the workplace. Workmen's Compensation Boards look to St John Ambulance in Canada for advice
- 1920s (throughout) St. John Councils work closely with the Workmen's Compensation Boards throughout Canada to establish safety standards in the workplace
- 1933 The Commandery of Canada is established
- 1933 First two Cadet divisions are formed in Manitoba (52c, Seven Oaks) and Ontario (47c, Timmins).
- 1935 First Cadet Nursing division (18c, Vancouver Central) is formed in Vancouver, BC.
- 1939-45 St. John Ambulance Nursing units from each Council are deployed in European theatre of war working closely with the Canadian Army in field hospitals and institutional settings.
- 1946 Canadian Order elevated to status of Priory becoming the Priory in Canada
- 1951 Canadian Red Cross (CRC) and St John Ambulance in Canada sign the St. John Ambulance-Canadian Red Cross Joint Operations Agreement in which SJAC recedes from offering blood services and the CRC recedes from offering First Aid training to industry.
- 1954 Updated Royal Charter of the Order by Queen Elizabeth II. The 'Venerable Order' becomes 'The Most Venerable Order'
- 1972 the Northwest Territories became a Territorial Council and runs the Air Ambulance Service in the Mackenzie Delta on behalf of the GNWT.
- 1973 St. John Ambulance in Canada modernizes its teaching methodology by instituting the multi-media approach to training and dispensing with the lecture method. WCBs in Canada continue to partner with St John Ambulance throughout Canada.
- 1977 CRC begins offering First Aid training to industry setting aside the 1951 agreement on Joint Operations with St. John Ambulance in Canada
- 1996 Yukon becomes a Branch of the British Columbia Council
- 1999 SJAC celebrated the 900th anniversary of the Order of St. John, together with the Alliance Orders of St. John, worldwide.
- 2006 Prince Edward Island Council merges with Nova Scotia Council to become the NS/PEI Council
- 2008 St. John Ambulance Canada celebrates its 125th anniversary, marking the first first aid course given in Canada, in Quebec City in 1883. "The Maple Leaf and the White Cross" (Christopher McCreery) is published in celebration of the anniversary
- 2009 The 125th anniversary of the inaugural St. John Ambulance first aid course conducted in Ontario at the Royal Military College of Canada (RMC) in Kingston, Ontario. According to a plaque laid at RMC, this course, which was conducted for the benefit of gentlemen cadets and staff, initiated a close and continuous association between St. John Ambulance and the Canadian Forces.

== Recognition ==
On 3 January 1982, Canada Post issued 'St. John Ambulance, 1883-1983' designed by Louis Fishauf. The 32¢ stamps are perforated 13.5 and were printed by Ashton-Potter Limited. in 2008 Canada Post issued a similar envelope/stamp in recognition of the 125th Anniversary of SJAC.

== Training ==
Led by a network of medical and health care professionals, St. John Ambulance in Canada is involved in first aid and CPR training and community services, working with other organizations in setting the standards for training in first aid, CPR and other life-saving skills. St. John Ambulance in Canada also offers many advanced level courses including the Medical First Responder (MFR) and Emergency Medical Responder (EMR) in several provinces. It provides community oriented courses like babysitting, as well.

== Medical First Response Services ==
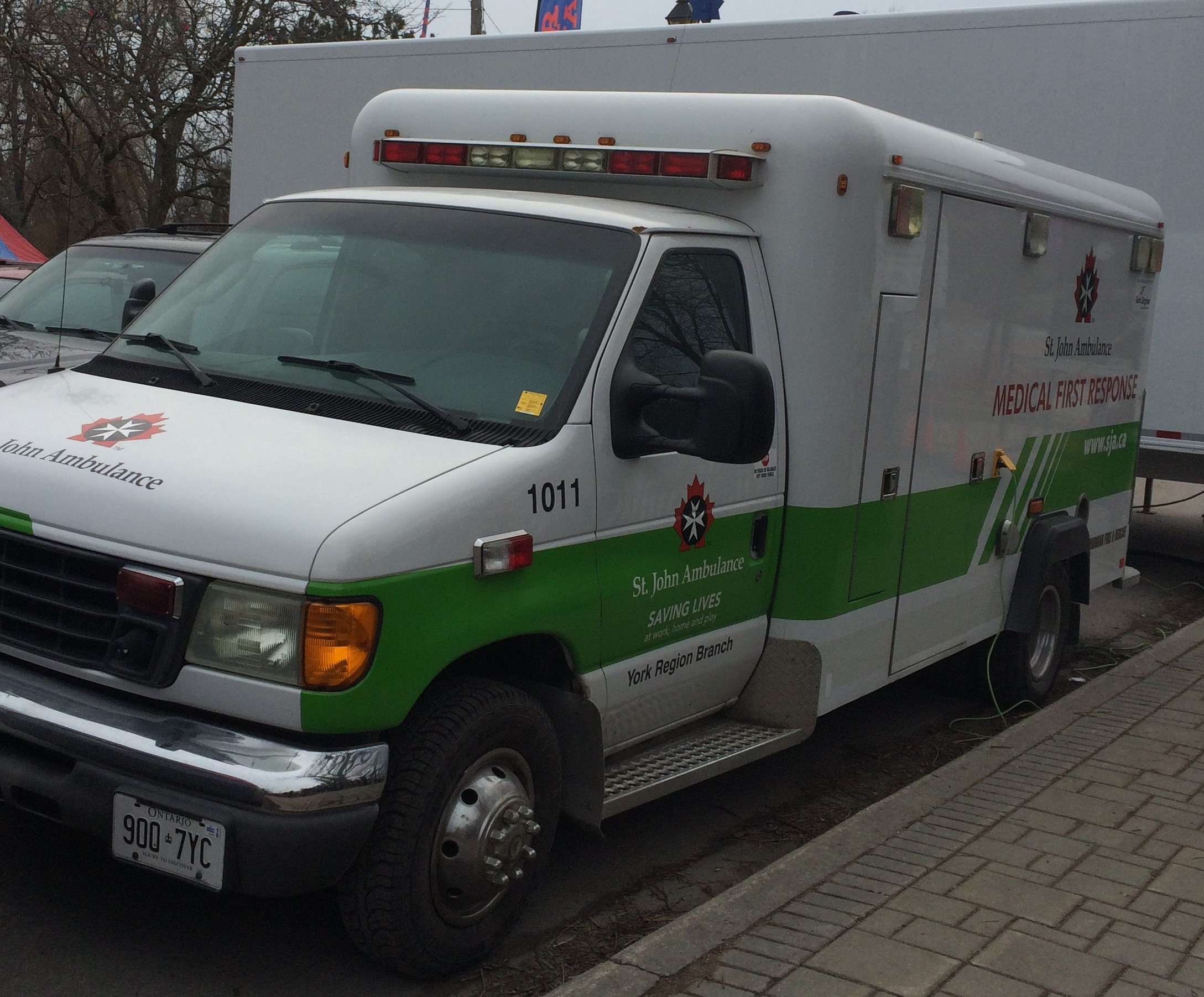
A St John Ambulance in York Region, Ontario

The Medical First Response Services were formerly known as St. John Ambulance Brigade and are often still referred to as such, both within the organization and by others. Each MFRS unit are a group of trained volunteers that serve within their community in a variety of ways. Services include first aid services at public events, Medical Services support in times of emergency or disaster, and youth programs that encourage community service and personal development.

SJAC provides patient care and first responder services at public events throughout Canada with their Volunteer Community Services, much in the same way as in England. Members in Canada wear a similar uniform, and are trained to the new Medical First Responder (MFR) program. In Nova Scotia, the volunteers no longer use the term "Brigade" or "Ambulance". They are now referred to as "St John Volunteer Medical Response". This change came about in an attempt to better reflect what the volunteers can offer to their communities.

SJA Alberta operates a Community Services (Com Serv) model that differs from the traditional SJA Ambulance Brigade, most notably being the removal of the traditional rank structure (in turn phasing out epaulettes and patches) and retiring the Probationary Observer role as eligible volunteers are able to directly enroll in a MFR course, and upon completion be activated as a fully qualified MFR volunteer. The duty uniform in Alberta consists of a Hi-Vis vest, MFR ID, black/white collared shirt, black/navy pants, and closed footwear. MFRs may also receive a baseball cap, jacket, toque, or other articles bearing the SJA emblem which are approved for wear. Due to extreme weather conditions, MFRs are authorized to wear appropriate outerwear to guard against weather conditions so long as the vest is worn overtop. Alberta ERU Volunteers are drawn from the existing MFR pool, and receive extra equipment such as jackets, gloves, and pants.

Saskatchewan, Newfoundland and Labrador, Ontario, and British Columbia are the only provinces that still wear their full uniform. In Ontario, operational (duty) uniform consists of a pair of black cargo pants (or tactical pants), a button up black shirt (with 'Medical First Responder' reflective on the back) or a Polo shirt. All will be marked with "Medical First Response" and "St. John Ambulance Volunteer" crests on both sleeves. Members in training or are working towards their MFR qualification will either wear a white shirt with "St John Ambulance Volunteer" crests on both sleeves, a black polo shirt, or an unmarked white dress shirt for probationary observers. Worth noting is that probationary observers already have a minimum of standard first aid training plus police security clearance. Rankings are clearly marked on epaulettes. For ceremonial, winter or certain indoor functions a black wool sweater and a black tie are also worn. For head dress, a SJA hat/ cap may be worn at outdoor events. A beret/ peak cap is worn for ceremonial or winter functions. Footwear consists of a pair of black boots/ shoes. Officers, with ranks of 1 pips and above, are also entitled to wear their ceremonial (No. 1) uniforms. The uniform consists of an officer's cap, a white shirt with tie, a tunic with metal buttons, pins, rank pips and full medals, a pair of black pants or skirt and black dress shoes.

Air and Ground Ambulance Services are no longer offered by St John Ambulance Councils in Canada. New Brunswick and Northwest Territories Councils once offered such services.

== Therapy Dog ==
The SJA Therapy Dog Program began in 1992 in Peterborough, Ontario and has expanded across the country. Partnerships have been established in hospitals, palliative care units, day care centres, senior residences, rest homes, special needs schools, psychiatric hospitals where people are often restricted from having pets and the Vancouver International Airport (YVR). The Therapy Dog program sees a volunteer and their dog make visits to an institution, often on a weekly basis. Before beginning the handler and their dog undergo extensive testing to ensure the animal has the right temperament for the program. There are many benefits to animal-assisted therapy, including decreased blood pressure and heart rate in patients as well as a chance for positive social interaction.

== We Can Help ==
SJAC provides elementary school students in grade 3 with the We Can Help Program, which provides children with an introduction to first aid skills and basic injury prevention messages, is designed for children ages seven through ten.

== Youth Programs ==
The proficiency program allows youth members to gain the Grand Prior's award, as well as work toward the Duke of Edinburgh's Award. Proficiencies are awarded for such demonstration of knowledge of subjects, both related and unrelated to the organization. The program is designed to meet the requirements of the Grand Prior's Award, and to give the youth valuable life skills. The Grand Prior's Award is achieved when the adolescent has completed 6 compulsory and 6 elective proficiency courses. In addition to this, youth members are given the opportunity to perform community service at public events, provided that they are supervised by trained adult members.

== Disaster planning and aid ==
In times of emergency, SJAC can be placed on standby, waiting to provide disaster relief and emergency services to the effected area. Exactly what procedures are taken greatly depends on local Disaster Management planners, however the government of Canada has officially recognised the role SJAC fills in the process. Supplies and equipment may vary as well as numbers of personnel immediately available in the area, but SJAC does have a plan already in place, in the form of the National Duty Officer, for the callup of additional personnel and equipment to augment local Units. This program is under review in New Brunswick as such a program is no longer established in most cities in the province.

== Positions, ranks and insignia ==
Some Councils in Canada have demilitarized the "Brigade" (now "Medical First Responder" or "Volunteer First Responder") dispensing with military-style ranks. However, other Councils in Canada (specifically BC/YK, Sask, Ontario and Quebec) still utilize military rank insignia similar to the current rank insignia of the Canadian Army. Physicians have epaulets with red borders. Registered Nurses wear their rank insignia over a red bar. Licensed Practical Nurses wear their insignia over a green bar while Paramedics wear theirs over a blue bar. Medical First Responders wear epaulets with one or two orange bars (Ontario)(Uniform standards were changed in 2008, but many members still have the older epaulets.)

Bar	Occupation
St. John Ambulance Rank Epaulette with Red Border	Physician
St. John Ambulance Rank Epaulette with Red Bar	Registered Nurse
St. John Ambulance Rank Epaulette with Green Bar	Licensed Practical Nurse
St. John Ambulance Rank Epaulette with Blue Bar	Paramedic
St. John Ambulance Rank Epaulette with Orange Bar	Medical First Responder

Insignia	Positions
	National Commissioner
	National Deputy Commissioner
	National Medical Officer; National Nursing Officer; National Training Officer; National Cadet Officer; National Planning Officer; National Therapy Dog Coordinator; National Administrative Officer; Provincial Commissioner; Brigade Commissioner [BC/Yukon]
	Deputy Provincial Commissioner [BC/Yukon]
	National Deputy Medical Officer; National Deputy Nursing Officer; National Deputy Training Officer; National Deputy Cadet Officer; Brigade Cadet Commissioner [BC/Yukon] Provincial President [BC/Yukon]
	Provincial Medical Officer; Provincial Nursing Officer; Provincial Cadet Officer; Provincial Training Officer; Provincial Administrative Officer; Provincial Planning Officer; Provincial Therapy Dog Coordinator Provincial Medical First Response Coordinator; Provincial Operations Officer; Provincial Chief Staff Officer; Area Commissioner; Deputy Brigade Cadet Commissioner [BC/Yukon]
	National Staff Officer; Provincial Deputy Medical Officer; Provincial Deputy Nursing Officer; Area Medical Officer; Area Nursing Officer; Area Training Officer; Area Cadet Officer; Area Administrative Officer; Area Therapy Dog Coordinator
	Corps Superintendent; Provincial Cadet Staff Officer [BC/Yukon]
	Area Staff Officer; Provincial Staff Officer
	Corps Medical Officer; Corps Nursing Officer; Corps Training Officer; Corps Cadet Officer; Provincial Cadet Staff Officer [BC/Yukon]
	Provincial Staff Officer; Area Staff Officer; Division Superintendent; Division Medical Officer; Division Nursing Officer; Division Therapy Dog Coordinator; Division Superintendent [BC/Yukon] Division Operations Officer[BC] Unit Chief (Ontario)
	Corps Staff Officer; Cadet Division Superintendent [BC/Yukon]
	Provincial Staff Officer; Area Staff Officer; Division Staff Officer; Division Provisional Officer; Division Training Officer; Division Administrative Officer; Division Community Service Coordinator; Division Asst. Therapy Dog Coordinator; Deputy Unit Chief (Ontario)
	Corps Staff Officer; Deputy Cadet Division Superintendent [BC/Yukon] Cadet Division Training Officer [BC/Yukon] Cadet Division Administrative Officer [BC/Yukon] Community Service Coordinator [BC/Yukon]
	Provincial Staff Officer; Area Staff Officer; Division Staff Officer; Division Provisional Officer
	Corps Staff Officer; Cadet Provisional Officer [BC/Yukon]
	Sergeant; Therapy Dog Evaluator
	Corporal
	Member; Cadet Squad Leader [BC/Yukon]

== See also ==
- St John Ambulance Ranks and Insignia
- Goodwin House - Former National Office Building
- Service Medal of the Order of St John
- Insignia of the Venerable Order of St John
