= St John Singapore =

Medical organization

St John Brigade, Singapore
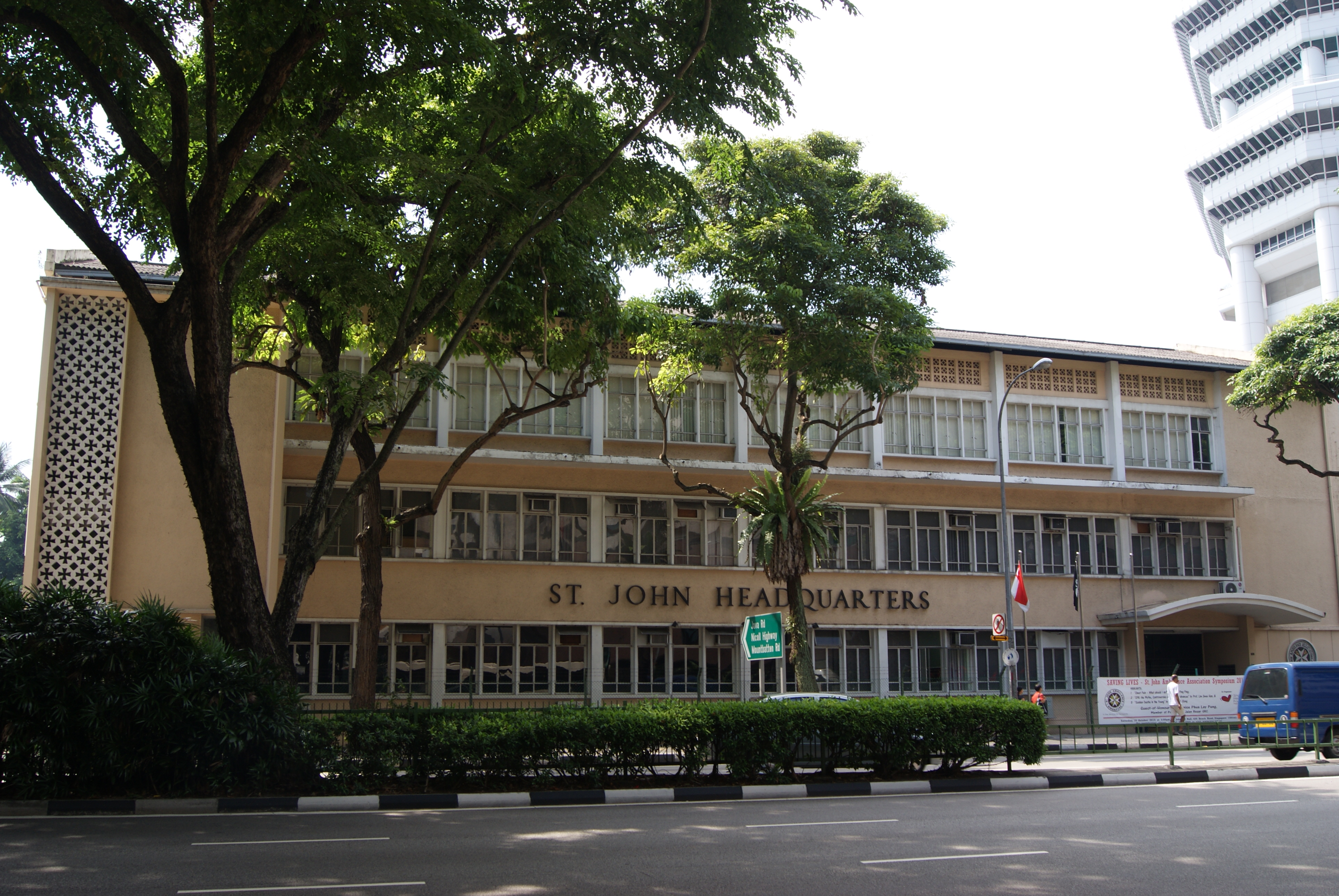
- Active: 1930 – Present
- Role: Volunteer Youth Organisation
- Headquarters: 420 Beach Road
- Mottos: Pro Fide, Pro Utilitate Hominum (For the Faith, For the Service of Humanity)
- Website: www.stjohn.org.sg

Commanders
- Prior and Council Chairman: Prof. Sean Rozario, KStJ
- Chief Commissioner: Dr. Koo Chee Hoe MStJ

St John Brigade Singapore is a voluntary secular organisation in Singapore established in 1877 which provides training in first aid and home nursing. It is affiliated with the Order of Saint John based in the United Kingdom. Its ambulance members (male members) and nursing members (female members) perform voluntary first aid coverage duties during national events and other events. The Brigade is under the governance of St John Council (Singapore) led by the Prior Professor Sean Rozario, KStJ, and works closely with St John Association and St John Fellowship Singapore.

The National Headquarters (NHQ) is located at 420 Beach Road and was officially opened on 24 June 1960 by the Yang di-Pertuan Negara (and subsequently President of Singapore), Encik Yusof bin Ishak.

== History ==
In 1877, the St John Ambulance Association (SJAA) was established in Singapore to train people in first aid. The St John Ambulance Brigade (SJAB), the uniformed companion body of the SJAA, was established in 1887 to gather qualified volunteers to render medical aid during public events and emergencies.

In 1885, the SJAA center was established in Singapore. After a few years, the centre closed and reopened in 1906. The centre closed again after its honorary secretary died.

In 1930, Chen Su Lan restarted a new SJAA centre and its first batch of trainees graduated in 1933. The uniformed division was subsequently established in September 1938

In 1952, the St John Council was created to manage both SJAB and SJAA in Singapore and in 1970, the council was registered as the National St John Council of Singapore.

In 1980, the SJAA and SJAB came together to be known as St John Ambulance Singapore (SJAS).

In January 2014, the Order of St John conferred SJAS the status of Priory. SJAS was then renamed as St John Singapore in the same year.

== Organisation and Structure ==
The St John Brigade is the uniformed branch of St John Singapore, which provides professional First Aid and ambulance services, and is well known for its Cadet (CCA) and Badger programmes.

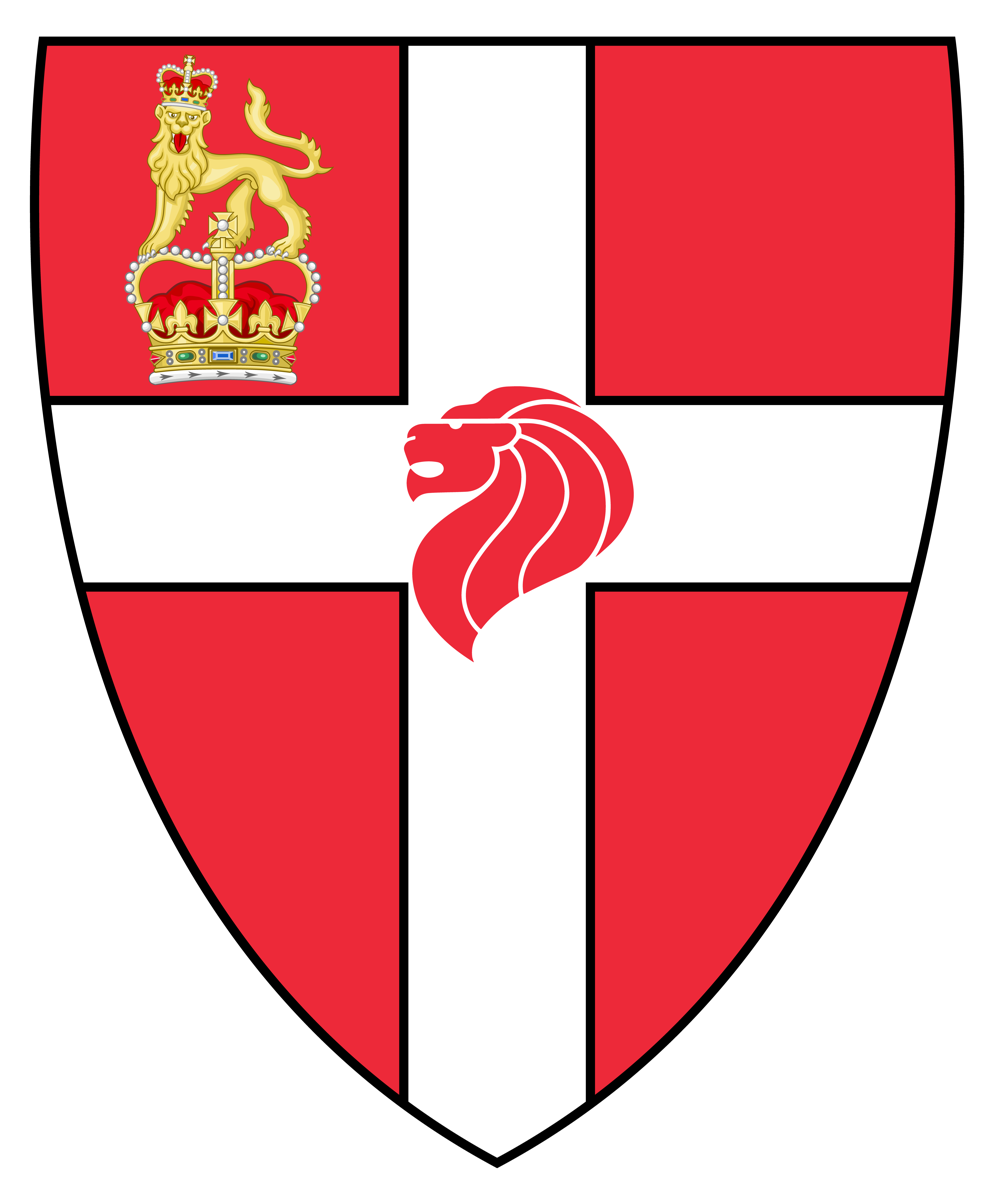
Priory of Singapore Coat of Arms

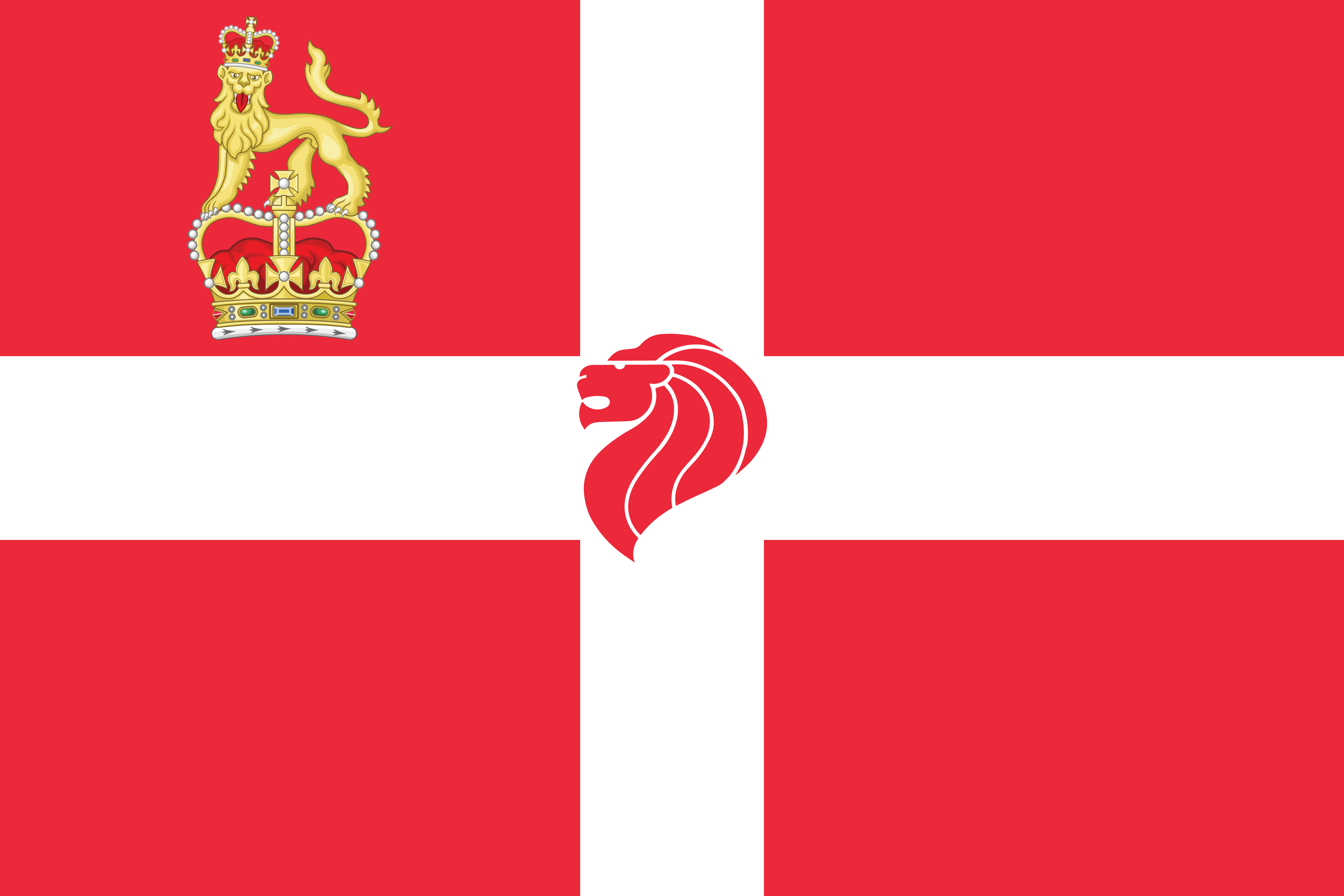
Priory of Singapore Flag

== Core Competencies ==
Students of participating schools may join St John Brigade as their Co-Curricular Activity (CCA), as cadet members. Typically, cadet members undergo training in four core competencies – First Aid, Home Nursing, Transportation of Casualty, and Foot Drill. These are conducted through Routine Training and other Training Camps that vary from Corps to Corps and District to District. In the interest of holistic development, cadet members also have the opportunity to participate in enrichment activities which can allow them to earn Cadet Proficiency Badges. Outstanding cadet members are awarded the prestigious Chief Commissioner's Badge after attaining 12 proficiency badges (with at least 2 from each of the 4 badge groups, Knowledge of the Order of St John (KOTO) Badge, and the Total Defence Badge).

== St John Day ==
As St John the Baptist Day, 24 June, normally falls during the Singapore School Holidays, corps typically observe St. John Day on the first Wednesday after school reopens. On that day, members don their Brigade Uniform during official school hours. A St John Day message by the Chief Commissioner is read out by the Principal or student leader during the morning flag raising ceremony. Where possible, the St John Flag is also raised alongside the State Flag and the respective School Flag. On this day also, members reaffirm their loyalty to the Republic of Singapore and affirm their commitment to the twin mottoes of the Order, 'For the Faith' and 'For the Service of Humanity', in reciting the St John Pledge.

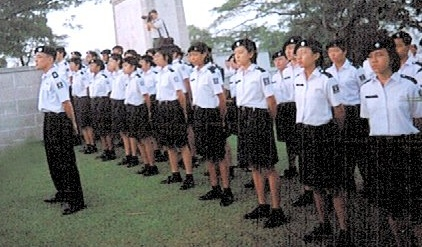
SJB Singapore cadets on parade

== Orders, Decorations and Medals ==
Officers and members are entitled to receive the following Orders, Decorations and Medals:

=== Local Awards ===
- The Commendation Medal of St John (CMSJ)
- The 5 Years First Aid Efficiency Medal
- The 1984 Golden Jubilee Commemorative Medal
- The Priory of Singapore Inauguration Commemorative Medal
- The Priory of Singapore Grand Council Conference Commemorative Medal

=== International Awards (awarded by the Order of St John) ===
1. Most Venerable Order of the Hospital of Saint John of Jerusalem
  1. The Bailiff / Dame Grand Cross of the Order of St John (GCStJ)
  2. The Knights / Dame of Justice of the Order of St John (KStJ / DStJ)
  3. The Knights / Dame of Grace of the Order of St John (KStJ / DStJ)
  4. The Commander of the Order of St John (CStJ)
  5. The Officer of the Order of St John (OStJ)
  6. The Member of the Order of St John (MStJ)
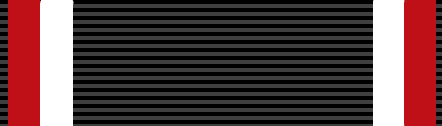
2. The Life-Saving Medal of the Order of St John*
3. Service Medal of the Order of St John
4. Ultra Long Service Extension of the Service Medal of the Order of St John

*To be worn on the right chest.

== Dress Regulations ==
=== Uniforms ===
At present, there are a total of 4 uniforms of St John Brigade Singapore, which are listed as follows:

1. Ceremonial Uniform
2. Mess Kit
3. Safari Uniform
4. Field Uniform

Cadet members are presently only entitled to wear the Ceremonial and Field Uniform, the latter of which is also the most widely recognised uniform of the St John Brigade Singapore. The Field Uniform consists of a black beret with a cap badge, depending on which is entitled to the wearer. Nursing members wear a hairnet as well. The top consists of a white short-sleeved shirt / blouse with plastic concealed buttons. For female members, due to the white uniform, bras should be of decent colours if worn. Shoulder flashes bearing the Maltese Cross with twin lions and unicorns, together with the words "St. John Singapore" are worn on both sleeves. A black epaulette is worn on both shoulders denoting the rank of the member. The bottom consists of black pants / culottes, which is worn with the St John belt. Black socks and black low-cut boots are worn with the shoelaces tied in the formal-style.

For Presidents, Senior Officers, Officers and Warrant Officers, the following 4 uniforms are worn:

| Common name | Description (Ambulance) | Description (Nursing) |
|---|---|---|
| Safari Uniform | A bush jacket with 4 big silver buttons in front, with epaulettes and metal rank insignias for both the men and the ladies. Medal ribbons are normally worn though full medals are sometimes worn during parades and ceremonies. Peak Cap or Beret is worn. | Same. Lady officers wear bowler hats or berets instead of peak caps and have the option of black culottes or slacks. |
| Field Uniform | Same uniform as for Members except for collar badges/gorget patches. Beret is worn. | Same. Lady officers have the option of black culottes or slacks. |
| Ceremonial Uniform | A long-sleeved version of the safari jacket, with mandarin collar. Full medals and Peak Cap or Beret is worn. | A long-sleeved version of the safari uniform with mandarin collar. Full medals and Bowler Hat or Beret is worn. |
| Mess Kit | A wing-collared shirt with maroon cummerbund bow-tie. Tuxedo jacket with miniature medals and rank insignias is worn. No headdress is worn. | A cross bow-tie. Tuxedo jacket with miniature medals and rank insignias is worn. No headdress is worn. |

=== Head Dress ===
==== Beret ====
Beret and Cap Badge for Members, Officers and Warrant Officers
| Rank | Beret | Cap Badge |
|---|---|---|
| Cadet Members | Beret with Cadet Cap Badge | Cadet Cap Badge |
| Adult Members | Beret with Adult Cap Badge | Adult Cap Badge |
| Officers, Warrant Officers Grades 2 to 4 | Beret with Officer Cap Badge | Officer Cap Badge |
| Superintendents, Commissioners and Warrant Officers Grade 1 | Beret with Senior Officer Cap Badge | Senior Officer Cap Badge (embroidered) |

==== Peak Cap and Bowler Hat ====
Peak Caps, Bowler's Hat and Cap Badge for Officers and Warrant Officers
| Rank | Cap Embellishment (Ambulance) | Cap Embellishment (Nursing) | Cap Badge |
|---|---|---|---|
| Officers and Warrant Officer Grades 2 to 4 | Peak Cap | Bowler's Hat | Officer Cap Badge |
| Superintendents and Warrant Officer Grade 1 | Peak Cap with a silver bar | Bowler's Hat with silver lining | Senior Officer Cap Badge (embroidered) |
| Commissioners | Peak Cap with a silver bar and St John wort | Bowler's Hat with silver lining | Senior Officer Cap Badge (embroidered) |

=== Distinguishing Marks ===
==== Collar Badges ====
| Rank | Adult Members | Warrant Officers, Officers and Superintendents |
| Collar Badges | | |

==== Gorget Patches ====
| Rank | Commissioners |
| Gorget Patches | |

== Rank structure ==
As a uniformed organisation that has a military heritage that originated with the Order of St. John, a rank structure used to distinguish members and appointment holders. In general, the rank one holds within the organisation corresponds with their appointment.

Ranks and Insignia of St John Ambulance (Commissioners)
| Rank | CC | DCC | SACC | ACC |
| Insignia | | | | |
| Title | Chief Commissioner | Deputy Chief Commissioner | Senior Assistant Chief Commissioner | Assistant Chief Commissioner |

Ranks and Insignia of St John Ambulance (Superintendents and Officers)
| Rank | SUPT | DS | AS | 1OFFR | 2OFFR | 3OFFR |
| Insignia | | | | | | |
| Title | Superintendent | Deputy Superintendent | Assistant Superintendent | First Officer | Second Officer | Third Officer |

Ranks and Insignia of St John Ambulance (Warrant Officers)
| Rank | WO1 | WO2 | WO3 | WO4 |
| Insignia | | | | |
| Title | Warrant Officer 1 Brigade Sergeant Major; HQ Warrant Officer | Warrant Officer 2 (Brigade / District) Sergeant Major (HQ / District) Warrant Officer | Warrant Officer 3 District Sergeant Major; District Warrant Officer | Warrant Officer 4 District Warrant Officer |

Ranks and Insignia of St John Ambulance (Adult and Cadet members)
| Rank | SSS | SSG | SGT | CPL | LCP | PTE |
| Insignia | | | | | | |
| Title | Senior Staff Sergeant | Staff Sergeant | Sergeant | Corporal | Lance Corporal | Private |

== Badges for Cadets ==
=== Brigade Badges for Cadets ===
The following badges are listed in order of precedence:

1. Chief Commissioner's Badge
2. Deputy Chief Commissioner's Badge
3. Commissioner's Badge
4. Superintendent's Badge
5. Corps First Aid Instructor's Badge
6. Corps Home Nursing Instructor's Badge
7. Basic Drill Instructor Badge
8. Unicorn Badge (Cease to be issued from 2018)
9. National First Aid Competition Champion Badge
10. National Activity Badge

=== Corps Appointment Badges (Phased out from 2021) ===
- Corps Secretary
- Corps Storekeeper

== National First Aid and Home Nursing Competition ==
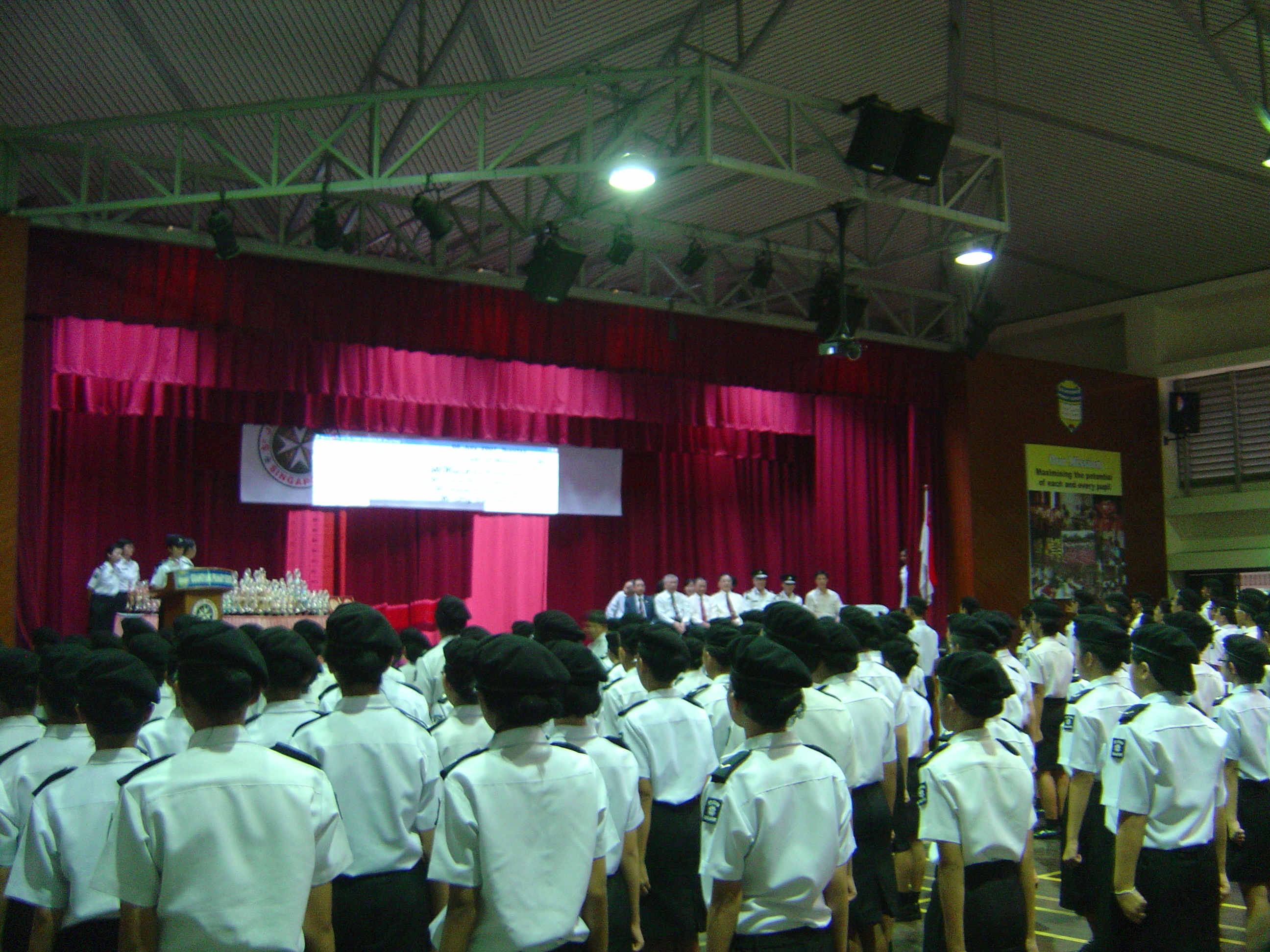
Release of results during Annual FA and HN Competition 2007

The National First Aid and Home Nursing Competition, typically referred to as the National First Aid Competition (NFAC), is an annual inter-district competition in which all 5 districts send teams to compete in each of the 4 categories. Prior to the NFAC, each district organises its own Inter-Corps First Aid and Home Nursing Competition with a similar competition framework. The 4 champion teams from each district represent their respective districts in the NFAC. These competitions aim to uphold the high first aid and basic nursing standards of the cadets.

=== Competition Categories ===
The 4 categories are listed below:

| Category | Description |
|---|---|
| Ambulance Adult (AA) | Males of age 15 above with Adult First Aid Certificate |
| Nursing Adult (NA) | Females of age 15 or above with Adult First Aid Certificate |
| Ambulance Cadet (AC) | Males of age 13 or below with Basic First Aid Certificate |
| Nursing Cadet (NC) | Females of age 13 or below with Basic First Aid Certificate |

=== Competition Framework ===
There are 2 frameworks for the competition, one for the Ambulance categories and one for the Nursing categories.

==== Ambulance Category Framework ====
AA and AC teams are expected to complete the following as part of the competition:

1. First Aid Long Case (20 mins)
2. First Aid Short Case (10 mins)
3. Transportation of Casualty (10 mins)

==== Nursing Category Framework ====
NA and NC teams are expected to complete the following as part of the competition:

1. Home Nursing Case (20 mins)
2. First Aid Medium Case (15 mins)

== See also ==
- Ranks and insignia of St John Ambulance (England)
- St Andrew's First Aid
