= St John Ambulance =

Name of multiple first aid organisations

- Maltese cross used by St John across the world

- Countries with national St John Ambulance organisations
- Abbreviation: SJA
- Formation: 1877; 149 years ago
- Parent organisation: Order of Saint John
- Website: stjohninternational.org

St John Ambulance is an affiliated movement of charitable organisations in mostly Commonwealth countries which provide first aid education, products and services as well as emergency medical services. St John organisations are primarily staffed by volunteer members and funded through their commercial endeavours, government contracts or donations. The associations are supported by the International Secretariat of the Order of St John (based in London) and its national priories.

== History ==
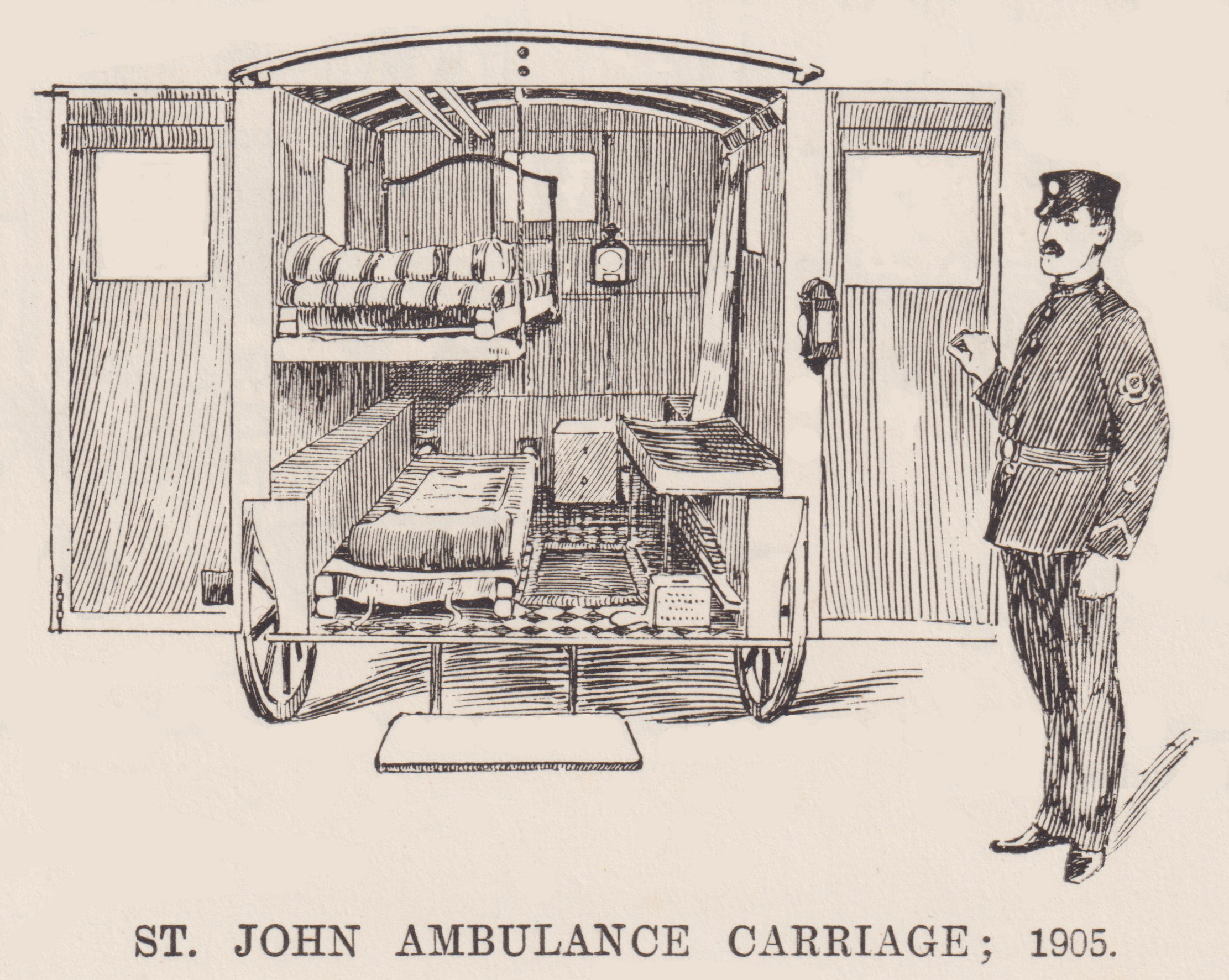
St John Ambulance carriage, Bristol, 1905

The first such organisation to be founded was the St John Ambulance Association, which was founded on 10 July 1877 in England to teach first aid in large railway centres and mining districts. Its first uniformed first-aiders were founded in June 1887 as the St John Ambulance Brigade. On 14 May 1888, the Order of St John was granted royal charter by Queen Victoria. In 1908, the organisation ceased operation in Scotland on mutual agreement with the St Andrew's Ambulance Association.

In 1974, the St John Ambulance Association and the St John Ambulance Brigade were amalgamated to form the St John Ambulance Foundation.

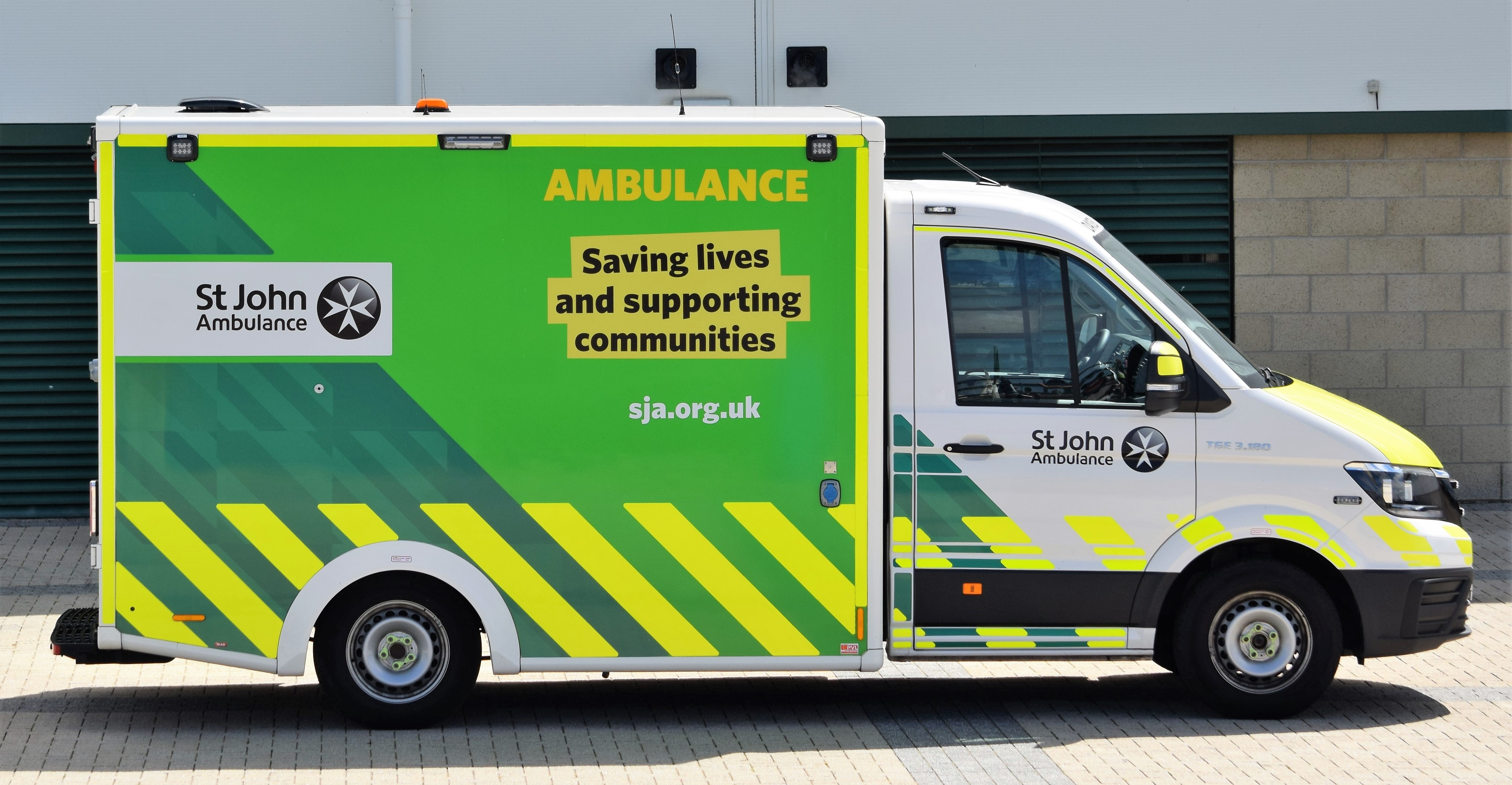
St John Ambulance in the UK

St John Ambulance now have over 40 national organisations - the charitable activity of The Order of St John, and approximately 200,000 volunteers worldwide.

The Order of St John owns the brand name in most countries (with the notable exception of India, which has a St John Ambulance organisation that is unconnected to the international movement). Logos vary in different countries but always contain the eight-pointed white Maltese cross as the essential identifier. Like the Order, St John Ambulance associations accept members of all religions. Their geographic organisation differs from the Order, and they have to contend with the differing national laws, medical practices and cultures of countries. As a result, the role and organisation of St John Ambulance varies by country.

== Organisation ==
The legal status of each organisation varies by country, province, state, county, territory and municipality. In both England and Wales the resident St John Ambulance organisations are simultaneously but separately registered as charities and companies, whereas St John Ambulance South Africa (for example) is a distinct entity registered as a "public benefit organisation".

The presence of St John Ambulance is different among countries:

- Australia
- British Armed forces
- Canada
- Cyprus
- England
- Gibraltar
- Hong Kong
- India
- Ireland
- Isle of Man
- Scotland
- Kenya
- Malaysia
- Mauritius
- New Zealand
- Northern Ireland
- Papua New Guinea
- Singapore
- South Africa
- Sri Lanka
- Tanzania
- Trinidad and Tobago
- Uganda
- Wales
- Zimbabwe

St John Ambulance were traditionally organised with military-style ranks. Some associations have replaced these with civilian titles (e.g. Unit Manager, Superintendent).

== Relationship with the Order ==
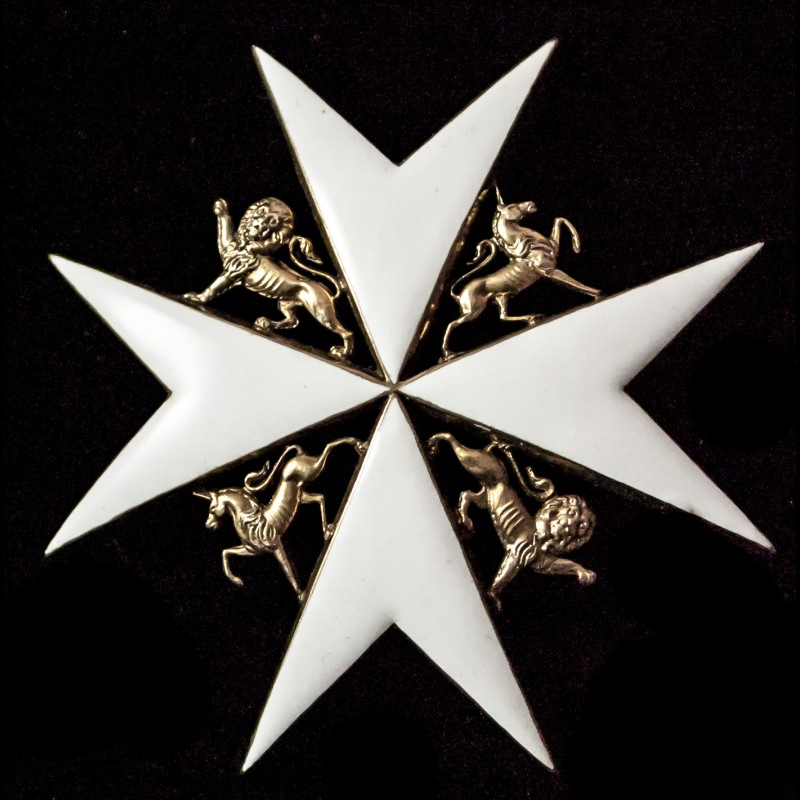
Badge of the Order of St John

The Order of St John, formally the Most Venerable Order of the Hospital of Saint John of Jerusalem, is an international order of chivalry which is headquartered in the United Kingdom. The Order founded the St John Ambulance associations and oversees their work. They also own the rights to the St John name and brand, including the Maltese Cross logo. The Order also oversees the St John Eye Hospital Group, which is separate from the ambulance associations. Membership of the Order is by invitation only, to recognise hard work and dedication in the service of the mission of St John.

== See also ==
Topics related to St John Ambulance and the Order:

- St John Ambulance Ranks and Insignia
- St John Ambulance Cadets in the UK
- Service Medal of the Order of St John

Similar movements:

- Johanniter-Unfall-Hilfe & Malteser Hilfsdienst e.V. (Germany)
- Venerabile Arciconfraternita della Misericordia di Firenze (Italy)
- International Red Cross and Red Crescent Movement (international)
- Sovereign Military Order of Malta (international)
  - Order of Malta Ambulance Corps (Ireland)
- Street medic
