= St John Ambulance Isle of Man =

British first aid organisation

- Website: sja.org.im

St John Ambulance Isle of Man (SJAG), officially The Commandery of the Isle of Man of the Most Venerable Order of the Hospital of St John of Jerusalem, is a charitable voluntary first aid organisation and the division of St John Ambulance in the Isle of Man. It provides people who provide cover at times of high demand. St John also provides Community First Responders. St John Training Services delivers workplace and community first aid sessions and runs a First Aid in Schools programme.
