= St John Ambulance South Africa =

St John Brigade South Africa
- Logo of St John Brigade South Africa
- Type: Charitable organisation
- Location: South Africa
- Members: 31 642 in First Aid (2007) * 2 422 in Home Based Care (2007)
- Website: http://www.stjohn.org.za

St John Brigade is the volunteer wing of the Priory for South Africa, of the wider international Order of St. John, dedicated to teaching first aid and home based care and the practice of these disciplines in communities across the country.

== The St John Brigade uniform ==
The St John Brigade uniform worn by members, is well known by many people and members are required to wear uniform when volunteering in the name of the Brigade, both for identification and to present a professional image. It is protected by law[3] and may only be worn by registered members. Unlike many volunteer groups, the St John uniform is relatively formal. There are several orders of dress intended for different situations. The most widely used is No.5 which is the most commonly used operational uniform, consisting of:

- White pilot shirt
- Black combat trousers
- Black NATO style V-neck sweater
- Epaulettes to carry rank
- Flashes on the shoulders, with their medical qualifications indicated via colour (black for First Aiders with basic level 1&2 training, green for First Aiders with advanced training to level 3, yellow for ambulance attendants and paramedics, red for medical doctors and purple for home carers and nurses.)
- A black peak cap is sometimes also worn.

Officers ceremonial uniform and is similar to a British Police uniform, for which members are sometimes mistaken.

== See also ==
- St. John Ambulance
- Venerable Order of St. John
- St. John Ambulance Brigade of Ireland
- Service Medal of the Order of St John
- Insignia of the Venerable Order of St John
