= Corps Badge =

Badge worn by military personnel

A Corps Badge is a Distinct badge worn by military personnel to distinguish themselves from other Corps, (Known as Branch insignia in the United States) where a Corps is a grouped by a common function (i.e. Infantry, Artillery, Cavalry, Signals Corps etc.) The use of Corps Badges and how a corps is identified is varied around the World.

== British Military ==
In the British Army each Corps has a distinct Cap badge for their corps as well as Stable belt.

== Irish Defence Forces ==
In the Irish Defence Forces the Air Corps and Army use Distinct Collar Corps badges for each corps, As the same Cap Badge is used by all Corps. The Air Corps has its own corps badge mainly worn by Line personnel, while Corps units retain their Corps badge.

== Uruguayan Military ==
The Armed Forces of Uruguay wear qualifications placed on a card holder on their uniform.

== American Civil War ==
Corps Badges were originally worn by Union soldiers on the top of their army forage cap (kepi), left side of the hat, or over their left breast.
