= Ranks and insignia of St John Ambulance (England) =

Ranks and insignia of St John Ambulance in England

From its beginnings, St John Ambulance in England has employed ranks and insignia to distinguish grades within its membership and management structure. Originally based upon the British Army officer and the British Army other ranks structure and insignia, the original ranks and insignia have been subject to several modifications over the history of the organisation.

As of 2024, epaulettes and role bars are used to identify clinical roles and positions for frontline services, whilst traditional rank insignia continue to be used only for internal and ceremonial purposes.

== History ==
The basic "star" or "pip" has at its centre the eight-point Maltese Cross, the badge of the Order of St John. The crown used is also that of the Order. At the higher general list ranks, crossed stretchers are used rather than the crossed sword and baton of military use. Insignia are in silver, again symbolic of the Order of St. John.

Also, officers who hold rank within the organisation at or above R4 wear a cockade in their hat (women) and have a silver bar (men), however at or above R3 wear a cockade and tuft (women) and silver bar and Wort cap (men).

Since the mid-1990s, the former "Senior NCO" and "Warrant Officer" ranks have been abolished. These ranks, whose titles were "Staff Sergeant", "Corps Sergeant Major", and "County (or District or Bailiwick) Sergeant Major" were deemed too militaristic in form, although a few previous incumbents remain. Their demise has gone hand in hand with a lowering of emphasis on parading and drill. The county Sergeant Major, if the county has appointed one, wears member rank slides and Warrant Officer Class 2 (St John Crown in laurel leaves) arm badges on the bottom of each arm.

Nurses previously wore rhodium metal bars on their shoulder straps. A red enamelled bar denoted a State Registered Nurse (SRN). A purple enamelled bar denoted a State Certified Midwife (SCM) and/or a Nurse on the Special Part of the State Register, i.e. psychiatric or learning disability. A green enamelled bar denoted a State Enrolled Nurse (SEN). Their use was abandoned in the mid-1990s.

In 2012, one Warrant Officer Class 1 (wearing Royal Arms badges in silver on both arms) was appointed at National HQ to advise on ceremonial matters across St John Ambulance.

=== 2013 review and subsequent changes ===
In December 2013, as a result of the rank review, a simplified rank structure was introduced, being fully implemented by the end of March 2014. The aim of the new rank structure was to ensure that rank is applied consistently throughout the organisation and that it is applied only based on an individual's role. A number of ranks were removed and the requirements for many of the remaining ranks changed.

The original Commissioned Officer ranks modelled on the British Army rank structure was largely replaced with insignia similar to the Metropolitan Police. A large number of ranks were removed and the structure simplified. It was decided to remove all NCO ranks for adult volunteers and staff across the organisation, though not cadets. A Sergeant Major at National Headquarters continues to be appointed to advise on matters relating to ceremonial events.

Assistants and Deputies were also no longer permitted through St John Ambulance, however additional team members were permitted to be added for geographical coverage.

In December 2016, it was announced that effective 1 January 2017, no rank is to be worn on events, except by persons who are performing an operational management role at that event. Persons who are undertaking an operational management role, but who do not have rank, will continue to not wear rank. Persons who do have rank, but who are not in an operational management role at the event, should not display their rank.

==== Role Bars ====
With the introduction of the green Service Delivery Uniform (replacing the traditional No. 2 Service Uniform), black removable Role Bars that could be fixed to the uniform were introduced that would denote the volunteer's role during operational work. Leadership positions on the frontline were no longer indicated by the volunteer's rank insignia, but by the role bar worn on the uniform.

Role Bars such as Operational Commander, Treatment Centre Manager, Team Leader etc. are provided to volunteer leaders during operations to indicate their operational role. If an Officer is deployed on the frontline and is not acting in a leadership position, they are required to wear the Uniformed Frontline Personnel (Formerly "Brigade Member") insignia to prevent confusion.

=== 2023 review ===
In June 2021, St John Ambulance embarked on another review of the service's rank structure, reviewing whether management rank insignia remained appropriate. Certain ranks, such the rank of Chief Volunteer introduced in 2013 had already been changed to Chief Commissioner prior to the review's commencement.

The review was put on hold during the COVID-19 Pandemic and was restarted in 2022 with a former Chief Constable appointed as chair. In May 2023, the conclusion of the Rank Review was officially announced concluding that Officers would continue to wear insignia to denote their position within the service. However, rank insignia were no longer to be worn by any volunteer in patient-facing activity, including those in management positions. This was implemented on 24 August 2023.

=== 2024/2025 review ===
Implemented in June 2025, the St John rank structure was revised to better align leadership rank with levels of responsibility across the volunteer organisation. The updated system applies consistently at local, county, and national levels, addressing inconsistencies and unintended grade inflation identified in a comprehensive Rank Review conducted in 2023. The revision reintroduced previously retired grades to create clearer progression and reflects changes to the organisation's volunteer structure, including the introduction of County Councils, Community Networks, and Communities of Practice.

== Insignia ==
=== Operational Rank and Insignia ===
Ranks and Insignia of St John Ambulance (Colours which may also apply to all ranks shown below)
Colour	Red (Doctor)	Grey	Green	Blue (Wales only)	Black
Insignia (rank slide)					
Meaning	Registered medical practitioners	Registered nurses and midwives	Registered paramedics	Technicians	Personnel without Healthcare; Professional registration

=== Management Rank and Insignia ===
Ranks and Insignia of St John Ambulance
Insignia									
Role 2025–present	Chief Commander Chief Executive	Chief Commissioner Uniformed Chief Officers (ELC)	Deputy Chief Commissioner Chief Clinical Officer	Commissioner of Region National Advisor Uniformed National Director/Head of Department	County Commissioner	Deputy County Commissioner Community of Practice Leader Associate Clinical Director	Community Network Lead County Lead (i.e. County Operations Lead) Community of Practice Officer	Community Network Functional Lead (i.e. Network Youth Lead) County Officer (i.e. County Ambulance Officer)	Uniformed Front line Personnel (including young people in SDU)
2014-2025	Chief Commissioner	National Advisers reporting to the SMT and Principal Priory Officers	Regional Management Team (including District and Department Managers) National Advisers not reporting to the SMT		Uniformed Regional Management Team direct report (Including Area Manager)	Uniformed Regional Management Team indirect report (excluding Unit Manager)	Unit Manager	Uniformed unit management team	Uniformed Front line Personnel (including young people in SDU)
Pre 2014	Chief Commander	Deputy Chief Commander	County Commander		Assistant Commissioner or County Staff Officer	Area Officer or County Staff Officer	Divisional Superintendent	Divisional Officer or Medical/Nursing/ Ambulance Officer	Brigade Member

- Note: At the end of 2012, the Counties of England merged into eight accountable "Regions", sub-divided into geographic "Districts"; each Unit (previously "Division") was grouped together with nearby Units to form numbered "Areas" within each District, under the oversight of an "Area Manager". Before this, "County" was the basic administrative unit for command purposes (in London the title "District" was used instead). For each of the Channel Islands of Jersey and Guernsey the title "Bailiwick" is used.

=== Unit Leadership Roles for Young People ===
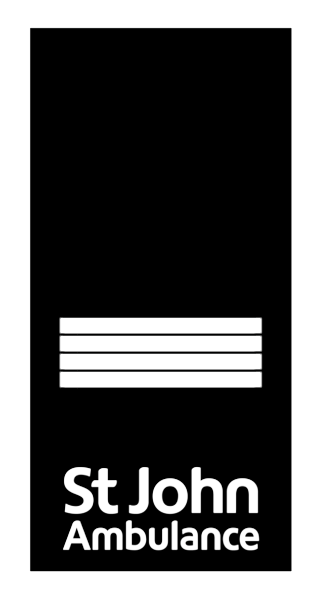
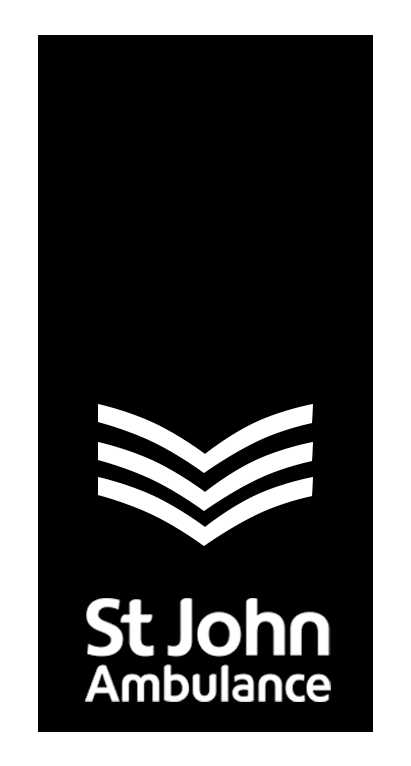
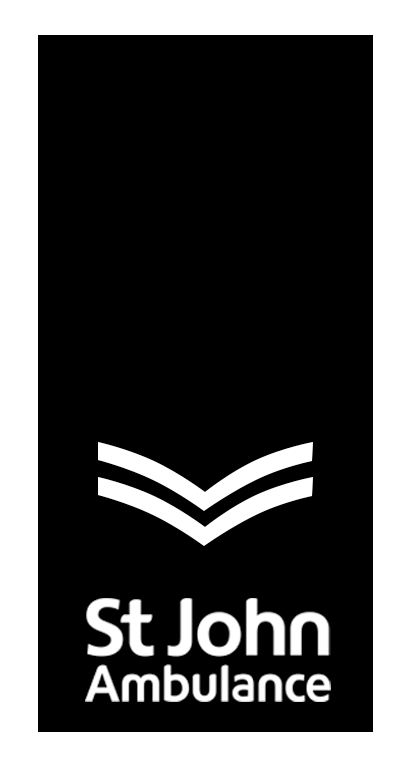
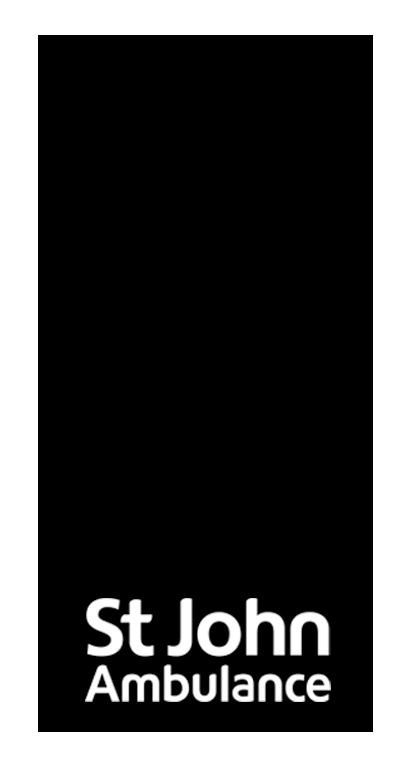
Cadet service	Cadet under officers	Cadet senior NCOs				Cadet junior NCOs		Cadets	Recruits
St John Ambulance Cadets ranks and shoulder marks									No insignia
St John Ambulance Cadets ranks and shoulder marks	No equivalent	Leading Cadet	No equivalent	Cadet Sergeant	No equivalent	Cadet Corporal	No equivalent	Cadet	Recruit
St John Ambulance Cadets ranks and shoulder marks		LCdt		CdtS		CdtC		Cdt	Rct

- Note: Non-Commissioned Officer ranks, prior to the Rank and Role review 2013, were available to adult volunteers. Post the 2013 changes, NCO ranks are not applied to adult volunteers.

== See also ==
- Service Medal of the Order of St John
- Insignia of the Venerable Order of St John
