= Warrant officer (United Kingdom) =

Non-commissioned rank in the British Armed Forces

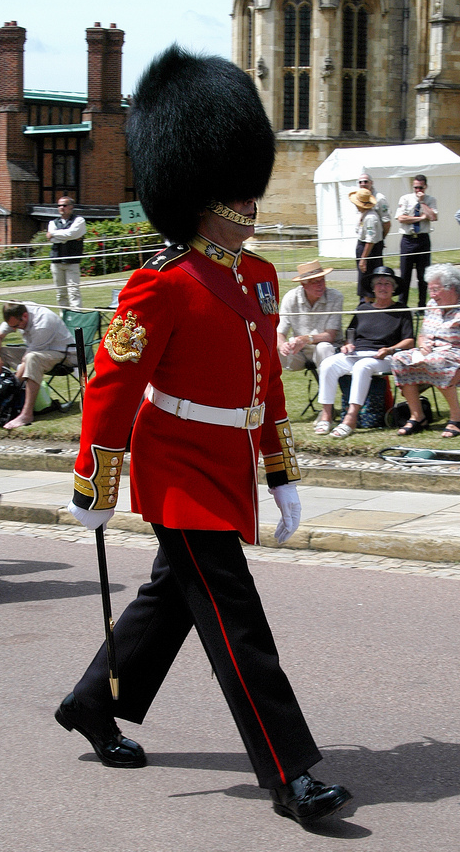
WO1 (GSM) Bill Mott, Welsh Guards

A warrant officer (WO) in the British Armed Forces is a member of the highest-ranking group of non-commissioned ranks, holding the King's Warrant, which is signed by the Secretary of State for Defence.

Warrant officers are not saluted, because they do not hold the King's Commission, but are addressed as "Sir" or "Ma'am" by subordinates. Commissioned officers may address warrant officers either by their appointment (e.g. sergeant major) or as "Mister", "Mrs" or "Ms" along with their last name. Although often referred to along with non-commissioned officers (NCOs), they are not NCOs, but members of a separate group (traditional official terminology for the personnel of a unit is "the officers, warrant officers, non-commissioned officers and men"), although all have been promoted from NCO rank.

In November 2018, the most senior warrant officer and most senior other ranks position was created, titled Senior Enlisted Advisor to the Chiefs of Staff Committee. A warrant officer in this position is the most senior warrant officer in the British Armed Forces.

== Royal Navy ==
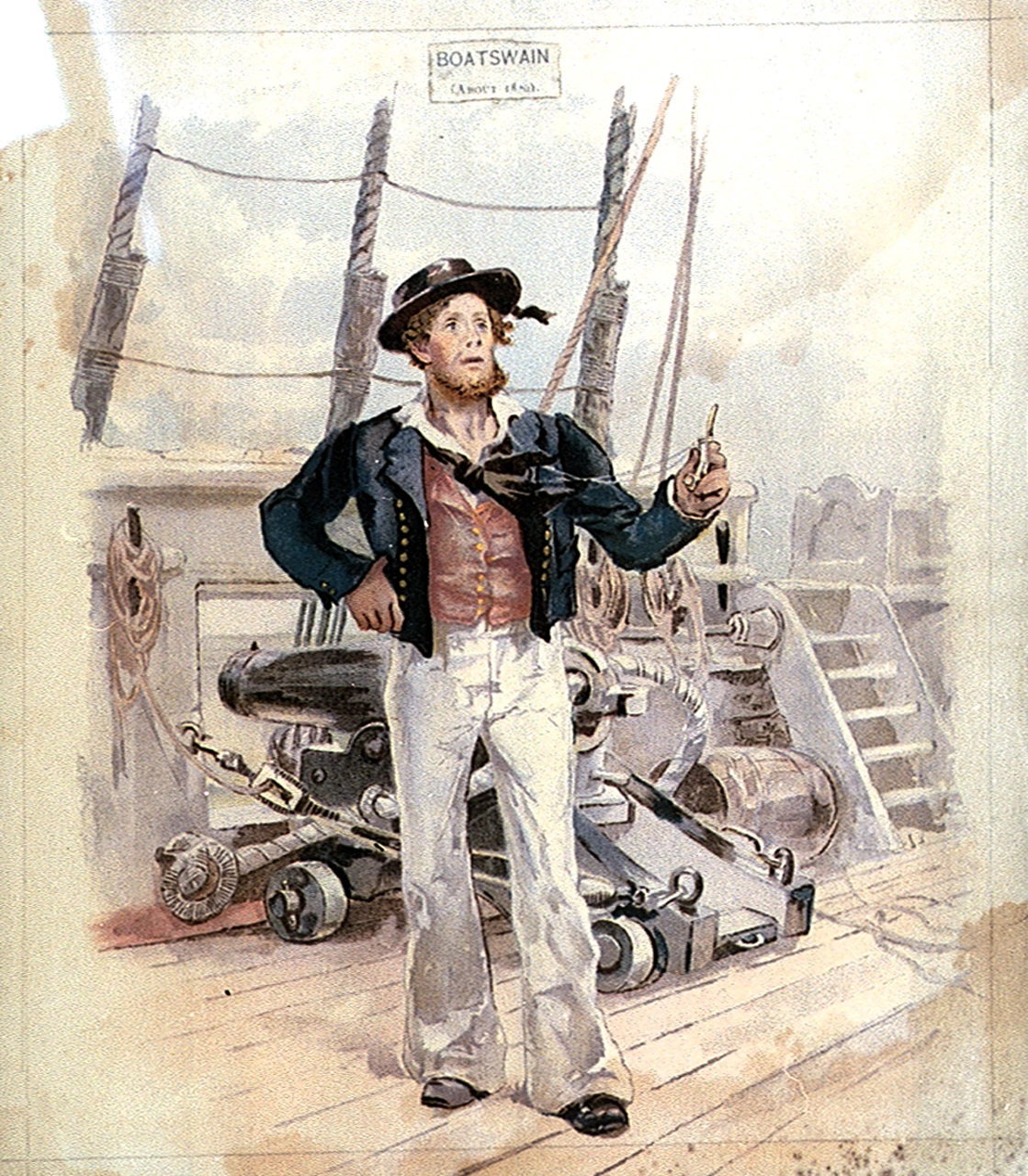
A boatswain of the Royal Navy in about 1820

Use of the term "warrant officer" dates from the beginnings of the Royal Navy, a time when ships were commanded by noblemen who depended on others with specialist skills to oversee the practicalities of life on board. Specialists such as a ship's carpenter, boatswain and gunner were vital to the safety of all on board, and were accordingly ranked as officers – though by warrant rather than by commission. These and other specialists retained their distinctive rank and status until 1949, when the rank of warrant officer was abolished.

In 1971, warrant officers reappeared in the Royal Navy, but these appointments followed the Army model, with the new warrant officers being classified as ratings rather than officers, superior to the rate of chief petty officer. They were ranked as equivalents to warrant officer class I in the British Army and Royal Marines and with warrant officers in the Royal Air Force. The rate was initially titled as fleet chief petty officer, becoming warrant officer in 1985.

In April 2004, the Royal Navy created the rate of warrant officer 2 (WO2), superior to the CPO and subordinate to existing warrant officers who were retitled as warrant officer 1 (WO1). The WO2 replaced the non-substantive appointment of charge chief petty officer (CCPO) in the technical branches. Prior to this change, a CCPO was classified as a NATO OR-8, equivalent to WO2. Royal Navy warrant officers wear the same insignia as their counterparts in the Royal Marines.

In 2005, the Royal Navy introduced the appointment of executive warrant officer (EWO) in all ships and shore establishments. The EWO is the senior warrant officer within the unit, and a member of the senior command team. The appointment is intended to be filled by an experienced WO1. Above these were five command warrant officers: CWO Surface Ships, CWO Submarines, CWO Royal Marines (subordinate to the Corps RSM), CWO Fleet Air Arm and CWO Maritime Reserves. Under the Navy Command Transformation Programme, there are now a Fleet Commander's Warrant Officer and a Second Sea Lord's Warrant Officer, all working with the Warrant Officer of the Naval Service, taking over the roles of the command warrant officers.

The most senior warrant officer is the Warrant Officer to the Royal Navy (WORN). This post replaced the command warrant officer working under the Second Sea Lord in 2010.

The WO2 rate began to be phased out in April 2014, with no new appointments and existing holders retaining the rate of WO2 until they were either promoted or had left the Royal Navy, except for those in Full Time Reserve Service roles, who were the only ratings to retain this rate. The WO2 rate was reinstated in 2021 for all branches.

=== Royal Marines ===
Before 1879, the Royal Marines had no warrant officers, but by the end of 1881, warrant rank was held by sergeant-majors and some other senior NCOs, in a similar fashion to the Army. Warrant officers were given equivalent status to those in the Royal Navy from 1910, with the Royal Marines gunner (originally titled gunnery sergeant-major) equivalent to the Navy's warrant rank of gunner.

Shortly after the Army introduced the ranks of warrant officer classes I and II in 1915, the Royal Marines did the same. From February 1920, Royal Marines warrant officers class I were once more retitled warrant officers and given the same status as Royal Navy warrant officers and the rank of warrant officer class II was abolished in the Royal Marines, with no further promotions to the rank, although men who already held it retained it.

As in the Royal Navy, by the Second World War there were warrant officers and commissioned warrant officers (e.g. staff sergeant majors, commissioned staff sergeant majors, Royal Marines gunners, commissioned Royal Marines gunners, etc.). As officers, they were saluted by junior ranks. These all became (commissioned) branch officer ranks in 1949, and special duties officer ranks in 1956.

In 1973 the Royal Marines reintroduced the same warrant ranks as the Army, warrant officer class 1 and warrant officer class 2, replacing the ranks (as opposed to appointments) of quartermaster sergeant and regimental sergeant major. The insignia are the same, but all Royal Marines WO2s wear the crown-in-wreath variation. As in the Army, many warrant officers have appointments by which they are known, referred to and addressed.

WO1 appointments are:

- Regimental Sergeant Major
- Artificer Sergeant Major
- Bandmaster
- Corps Bandmaster
- Corps Bugle Major
- Corps Drum Major

WO2 appointments are:

- Company sergeant major
- Regimental quartermaster sergeant
- Bandmaster
- Drum Major

The most senior Royal Marines WO1 is the Corps Regimental Sergeant Major. Directly junior to him is the Command Warrant Officer.

The rank below WO2 is colour sergeant, the Royal Marines equivalent of staff sergeant. The Royal Marines rank of warrant officer class 2 was unaffected by the 2014 phaseout of the rank in the Royal Navy.

Rank insignia of the Corps Regimental Sergeant Major (Royal Marines)

Warrant Officer Class 1 (Royal Marines)

Warrant Officer Class 2 (Royal Marines)

Warrant Officer Class 2, Bandmaster (Royal Marines Band Service)

== British Army ==
In the British Army, there are two warrant ranks, warrant officer class 2 (WO2) and warrant officer class 1 (WO1), the latter being the senior of the two. It used to be more common to refer to these ranks as WOII and WOI (using Roman instead of Arabic numerals). Warrant officer 1st class or 2nd class is incorrect. The rank immediately below WO2 is staff sergeant, colour sergeant or staff corporal depending on regiment/corps. Until 1915, there was only a single rank of warrant officer. In 1915, the rank of warrant officer class II was introduced and former warrant officers were regraded as warrant officers class I.

WO1s wear a royal coat of arms on the lower sleeve, except for the regimental sergeant majors of Foot Guards Regiments who wear a larger version of the same coat of arms on the upper sleeve. The insignia of those holding the most senior WO1 appointment of Conductor is the coat of arms surrounded by a wreath.

WO2s are identified by a crown on the lower sleeve, surrounded by a wreath for quartermaster sergeants and all WO2s in the Royal Army Medical Corps and formerly in the 9th/12th Royal Lancers. The wreath was used for all WOIIs from 1938 to 1947.

From 1938, there was also a rank of warrant officer class III (WOIII). The only appointments held by this rank were platoon sergeant major, troop sergeant major and section sergeant major. The WOIII wore a crown on his lower sleeve (which is why all WOIIs switched to a crown in a wreath during this period). The rank was placed in suspension in 1940 and no new appointments were made, but it was never officially abolished.

Historically, the four most senior warrant officer appointments in the British Army according to King's Regulations were, in descending order of seniority:

- Conductor, Royal Logistic Corps
- Royal Artillery Sergeant Major, Royal Artillery
- Academy Sergeant Major, Royal Military Academy Sandhurst
- Garrison Sergeant Major, London District

In 2015, the new appointment of Army Sergeant Major was introduced. The holder of this appointment is now the most senior warrant officer in the British Army.

=== WO1 ===
Until 1993, the border on a WO1 insignia represented the following:

Colour	Unit(s)
Yellow	Royal Armoured Corps (except Royal Tank Regiment), Royal Corps of Transport, Royal Army Pay Corps
Scarlet	Infantry, Royal Military Police, Royal Pioneer Corps
Cambridge blue	Army Air Corps, Small Arms School Corps
Red	Royal Artillery, Royal Army Ordnance Corps
Black	Royal Tank Regiment
Light green	Royal Army Dental Corps, Intelligence Corps
Blue	Royal Engineers, Royal Signals, Royal Electrical and Mechanical Engineers
Dull cherry	Royal Army Medical Corps
Low visibility	Parachute Regiment, Royal Army Veterinary Corps

=== Appointments ===
Most warrant officers have an appointment, and they are usually referred to by their appointment rather than by their rank.

==== Appointments held by WO1s ====
Insignia of the WO1 Army sergeant major (Note: The appointments of: Army command sergeant major; Command sergeant majors (including Royal Artillery sergeant major and the academy sergeant major, RMAS); Conductor, RLC (royal arms in a blue wreath); Master gunner, RA)

Insignia of a WO1 regimental sergeant major (Note: The appointments of: Garrison sergeant major (except for the GSM London district who uses the royal arms on a four-bar chevron); Regimental corporal major; Regimental sergeant major; Staff sergeant major, RLC or AGC(SPS); Sergeant major; Any other WO1 appointment on the establishment of a unit or corps e.g. artificer sergeant major, superintending draughtsman)

Insignia of a warrant officer class 1
- Academy Sergeant Major (AcSM)
- Accountant Sergeant Major (obsolete)
- Armament Sergeant Major (obsolete)
- Armourer Sergeant Major (obsolete)
- Army Sergeant Major
- Artificer Sergeant Major (ASM)
- Bandmaster (BM)
- Band Sergeant Major (BSM)
- Clerk of Works
- Conductor (Cdr)
- Drum Major
- Farrier Corporal Major (obsolete)
- Farrier Sergeant Major
- Foreman of Signals (Information Systems) (FofS IS)
- Foreman of Signals (FofS)
- Foreman of Signals Sergeant Major (obsolete)
- Foreman of Works Sergeant Major
- Garrison Sergeant Major (GSM)
- Instructor (Educational) (obsolete)
- Master Gunner 1st Class
- Master Gunner 2nd Class
- Mechanist Sergeant Major (obsolete)
- Pipe Major
- Regimental Corporal Major (RCM)
- Regimental Sergeant Major (RSM)
- Regimental Sergeant Major Instructor (RSMI)
- Saddler Sergeant Major (obsolete)
- Schoolmaster (obsolete)
- 1st Class Schoolmaster (obsolete)
- Senior Drum Major
- Sergeant Major (obsolete)
- Sergeant Major Artillery Clerk (obsolete)
- Sergeant Major Instructor (SMI)
- Staff Sergeant Major (SSM)
- 1st Class Staff Sergeant Major (obsolete)
- Sub-Conductor (obsolete)
- Superintending Clerk
- Yeoman of Signals (YofS)
- Yeoman of Signals (Electronic Warfare) (YofS (EW))

==== Appointments held by WO2s ====
Insignia of a WO2 regimental quartermaster sergeant

Insignia of a WO2 squadron/battery/company sergeant major

Insignia of a warrant officer class 2
- Accountant Quartermaster Sergeant (obsolete)
- Armament Quartermaster Sergeant (obsolete)
- Armourer Quartermaster Sergeant (obsolete)
- Artificer Quartermaster Sergeant (AQMS)
- Band Corporal Major (BCM)
- Band Sergeant Major (BSM)
- Battery Sergeant Major (BSM)
- Clerk of Works Quartermaster Sergeant
- Company Sergeant Major (CSM)
- Drill Sergeant (DSgt)
- Drum Major
- Farrier Corporal Major
- Farrier Quartermaster Corporal (obsolete)
- Farrier Quartermaster Sergeant
- Fitter Quartermaster Sergeant (obsolete)
- Foreman of Signals (Information Systems) (FofS IS)
- Foreman of Signals (FofS)
- Foreman of Signals Quartermaster Sergeant (obsolete)
- Foreman of Works Quartermaster Sergeant
- Garrison Quartermaster Sergeant
- Master Gunner 3rd Class (obsolete)
- Mechanist Quartermaster Sergeant (obsolete)
- Orderly Room Quartermaster Sergeant (ORQMS)
- Orderly Room Sergeant (ORS) (obsolete)
- Pipe Major
- Quartermaster Corporal Major (obsolete)
- Quartermaster Sergeant Artillery Clerk (obsolete)
- Quartermaster Sergeant Instructor (QMSI)
- Regimental Quartermaster Corporal (RQMC)
- Regimental Quartermaster Sergeant (RQMS)
- Regimental Signals Warrant Officer (RSWO)
- Saddler Quartermaster Sergeant (obsolete)
- Schoolmaster (obsolete)
- Sergeant Major Instructor Signals (SMIS) (obsolete)
- Sergeant Major Signals (SMS)
- Squadron Corporal Major (SCM)
- Squadron Sergeant Major (SSM)
- Staff Quartermaster Sergeant (SQMS), used in the Royal Corps of Transport (formerly), Royal Army Service Corps, Royal Logistic Corps and Adjutant General's Corps
- Technical Quartermaster Sergeant (TQMS)
- Troop Sergeant Major
- Trumpet Major
- Yeoman of Signals (YofS)

=== Forms of address ===
How warrant officers are addressed depends, as does much else in the British Army, on the traditions of their regiment or corps. However, there are some rules of thumb:

- WO1s are usually addressed as "Mr surname" by officers and by their peers, and as "sir" or "Mr surname, sir" by their subordinates (for female WO1s, "Mrs, Ms or Miss surname", "ma'am", and "Mrs, Ms or Miss surname, ma'am", respectively).
- WO2s should only be addressed by their appointment, for example "Sergeant Major", "Corporal Major", "Q" for quartermaster sergeants or "RQ" for the regimental quartermaster sergeant, by their peers and superiors. They should be addressed as "sir" or "ma'am" by subordinates, although some WO2s prefer to be addressed by their appointment by them too. It is common for a WO2 not in a sergeant major or quartermaster sergeant appointment to be addressed as "Mr surname" by officers.
- A notable exception to the above is the Foot Guards and Honourable Artillery Company, where the regimental sergeant major is known as, and addressed by officers as, "Sergeant Major" and the company (or squadron in the Honourable Artillery Company) sergeant majors are addressed as "Company Sergeant Major" or "Squadron Sergeant Major".

== Royal Air Force ==
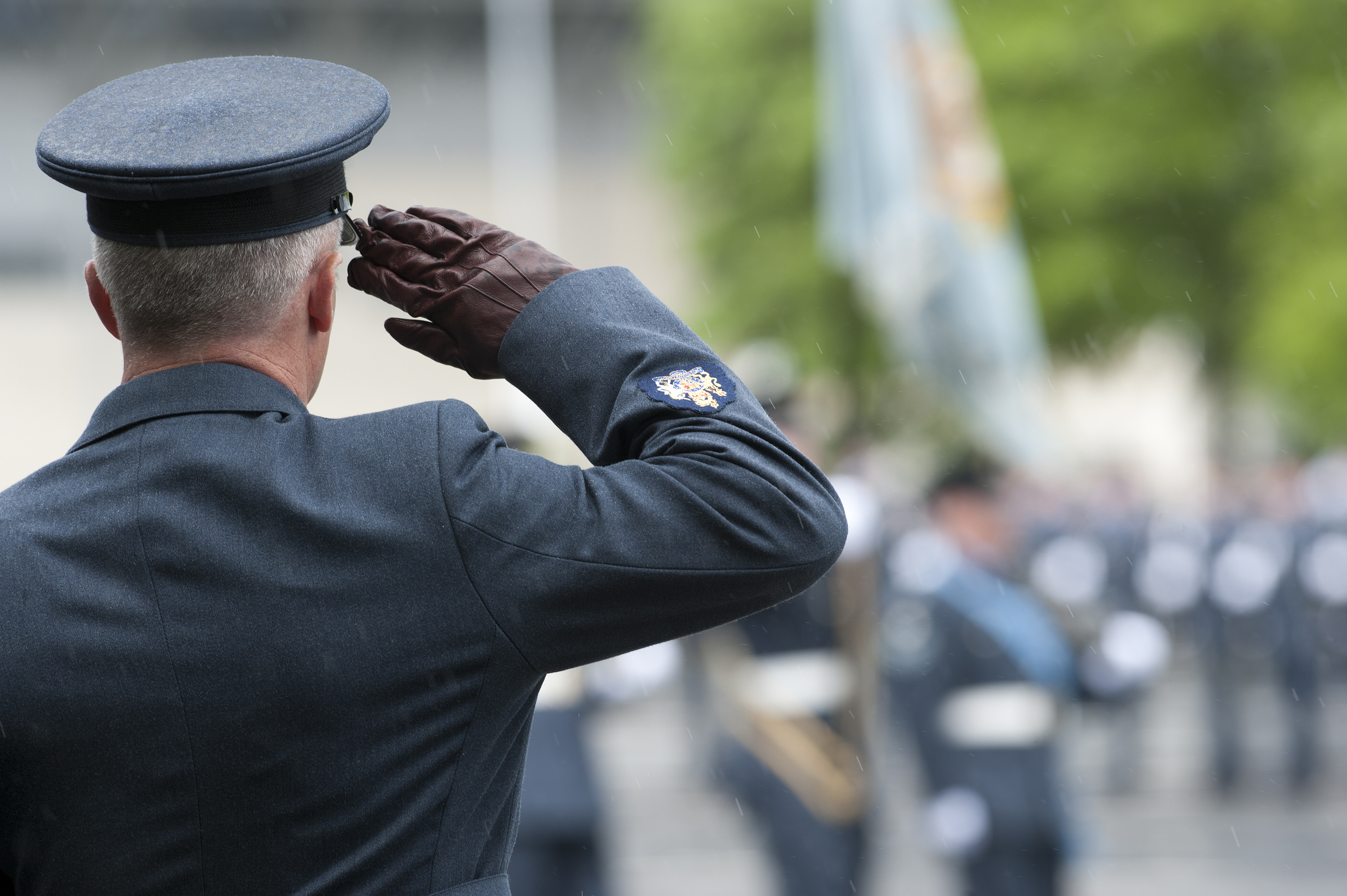
An RAF warrant officer saluting the colours

The Royal Air Force originally used the ranks of sergeant-major 1st and 2nd class which it inherited from the Royal Flying Corps. These ranks wore the rank badges of the royal coat of arms (commonly referred to as the 'Tate and Lyles' – a reference to the similarity to the logo used by the Tate and Lyle Company) and the crown respectively.

In the 1930s, it changed to the Army-style warrant officer class I and II. In 1939, the RAF abolished the rank of WOII and retained only the WOI rank, referred to simply as warrant officer (WO), which it remains to this day.

The RAF has no equivalent to WO2 (NATO OR-8), an RAF WO being equivalent to WO1 in the Army, Royal Navy and Royal Marines (NATO OR-9) and wears the same badge of rank, the royal coat of arms.

Warrant officers are addressed as "sir" or "ma'am" by other ranks and "Mr or Ms -Name-" or "Warrant Officer -Name-" by officers. RAF warrant officers do not hold appointments as in the Army or Royal Marines. However, the station warrant officer is considered "first amongst equals" by the other warrant officers on an RAF station. Warrant officers are the highest non-commissioned rank and they rank above flight sergeants.

In 1946, the RAF renamed its aircrew warrant officers master aircrew, a designation that still survives. In 1950, it renamed warrant officers in technical trades master technicians, a designation that only survived until 1964.

The most senior RAF warrant officer by appointment is the Warrant Officer of the Royal Air Force.

== Cadet organisations ==
=== Combined Cadet Force (Royal Navy) ===
Although unused for cadets by the Sea Cadet Corps, except for Cadet Force Adult Volunteers (CFAVs), the Royal Navy Sections of the Combined Cadet Force use the rank of warrant officer as the most senior cadet rank. Cadet warrant officers are addressed as "Warrant Officer". They wear the Royal Coat of Arms in red with the "CCF" below also in red.

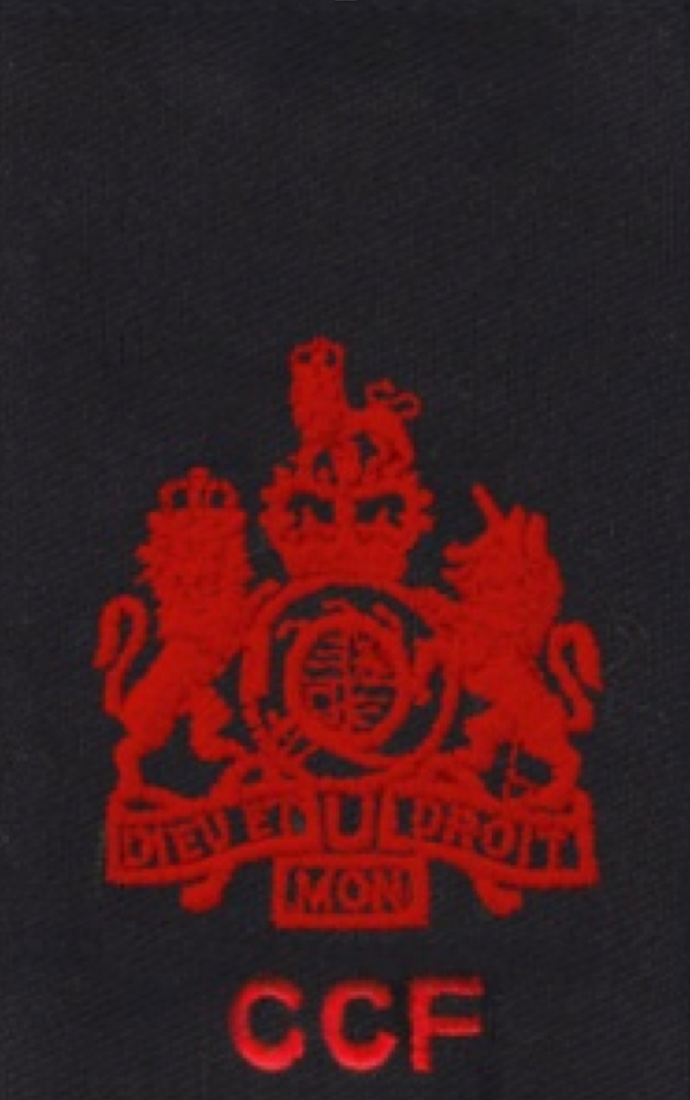
Warrant Officer Cadet of the CCF Royal Navy Section

=== Army Cadet Force and Combined Cadet Force (Army) ===
The rank of warrant officer does not exist in the Army Cadet Force and Combined Cadet Force (Army). Instead, the ranks of sergeant major instructor (SMI) or regimental sergeant major instructor (RSMI) are used. Their rank insignia is the similar to that as worn by Army warrant officers, but with the addition of the letters ACF or CCF. As with adult staff, cadets do not use the ranks of warrant officer. The ranks of cadet company sergeant major (Cdt CSM) and cadet regimental sergeant major (Cdt RSM) are used instead. Cadet warrant officers are not addressed as "Sir/Ma'am" by their subordinates but rather as "Sergeant Major" or a variation of such. Their rank insignia is similar to that worn by Army warrant officers but with the addition of the word "CADET" in red.

Cadet Regimental Sergeant Major of the ACF and CCF Army Section,
Cadet Warrant Officer Class 1 of the CCF Royal Marines section

Cadet Regimental Quartermaster Sergeant of the CCF Army Section,
Cadet Warrant Officer Class 2 of the CCF Royal Marines section

Cadet Company Sergeant Major of the ACF and CCF Army Section

=== Air Training Corps and Combined Cadet Force (RAF) ===
Cadets in the Air Training Corps and the RAF Section of the Combined Cadet Force may hold the rank of cadet warrant officer (CWO). This is the senior cadet rank of the RAF Air Cadets.

Unlike other cadet promotions in the ATC the appointment to CWO is made by the wing commander on the recommendation of the cadet's squadron commander and usually follows a promotion board.

For a CCF section, the appointment is made by the head of section or contingent commander but requires the approval of the TEST officer. The number of CWOs on a section depends on the size of the section/contingent and some smaller units are not permitted a CWO, although that rule can be waived for exceptional cadets.

Their role will vary between squadrons/sections, but they are generally responsible for leading the cadet NCO team, managing training and liaising with the adult staff. In the Air Training Corps, cadets must be at least 17 years of age to become a CWO; this requirement does not apply to CCF (RAF).

ATC or CCF (RAF) adult staff who are promoted to warrant officer are known as warrant officers RAFAC, and, as with other RAFAC NCO ranks, they are civilian members of the ATC or CCF (RAF), not members of the Royal Air Force and have no obligation or commitment to duties within the regular or reserve Royal Air Force. Nor do they command any seniority within or over members of the regular or reserve Royal Air Force.

The senior warrant officer in the RAF Air Cadets is called the Warrant Officer of the Royal Air Force Air Cadets (WORAFAC) (formerly the Commandant Air Cadets Warrant Officer (CACWO)) and holds an equivalent role to the Warrant Officer of the Royal Air Force in the RAF. Prior to October 2020, the CACWO was one of the twelve nominated warrant officers within the RAFAC who were always entitled to wear the Royal Coat of Arms. Others included:

- Regional warrant officers (RWOs)
- The Corps Bandmaster
- The Corps Drill and Ceremonial Warrant Officer

Former service personnel who reached the rank of warrant officer (or warrant officer class 1) in the Royal Navy, British Army, Royal Air Force, or Royal Marines were also always permitted to retain the Royal Arms rank insignia when serving in the Air Training Corps and CCF (RAF). From October 2020, all RAFAC warrant officers were authorised to wear the Royal Coat of Arms instead of the crown that they had worn since the 1980s. They were also granted a Cadet Forces Warrant from the Secretary of State.

Adult warrant officers serving as aircrew in air experience flights or volunteer gliding schools wear a unique rank slide; those who were former master aircrew in the RAF wear the standard MAcr rank slides.

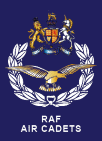
Master Aircrew

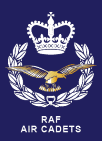
WO Aircrew (Note: No longer used - as of October 2020, all MAcr (RAFAC) use the Royal Arms badge.)

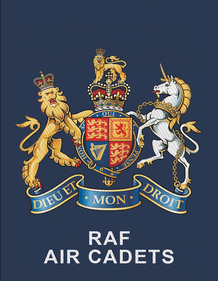
Adult Warrant Officer

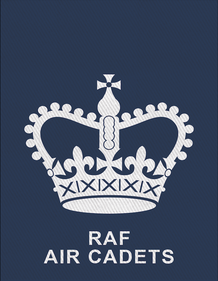
Adult Warrant Officer (Note: No longer used - as of October 2020, all WO (RAFAC) use the Royal Arms badge.)

Cadet Warrant Officer

== See also ==
- Ranks and insignia of NATO Armies Enlisted
- Ranks and insignia of NATO Air Forces Enlisted
- Ranks and insignia of NATO Navies Enlisted
