= Royal Signals trades =

British Army employment specialisations

The Royal Signals trades are the employment specialisations of the Royal Corps of Signals in the British Army. Every soldier in the Corps is trained both as a field soldier and a tradesman. There are currently six different trades, all of which is open to both men and women:

- Networks Engineer: an expert in computer network deployment and operation, and military radio communications.
- Information Services Engineer: an expert in data communications and computer networks, web and database development and cyber security.
- Power Engineer: an expert in designing, maintaining and repairing deployable power systems.
- Communications Infrastructure Engineer: an expert in designing, installing and repairing fibre optic and copper voice and data networks, both internally and externally.
- Electronic Warfare & Signals Intelligence Operator: an expert in both tactical electro-magnetic, cyber and signals intelligence on the battlefield and close tactical support to and advice to bomb disposal units.
- Supply Chain Operative: an expert trained in all aspects of communications logistics and supply, including transport, warehouse management and administration.

== Initial training common to all trades ==
Every soldier first completes Basic Training, also known as Phase One Training. Adult Entry soldiers complete a 14-week course at Army Training Regiment at Winchester or at the Army Training Centre Pirbright, in Surrey. Junior Entry soldiers (16–17.5 years old) complete a 23-week course at the Army Foundation College at Harrogate. Both Junior and Adult Entry course teach the common basic military skills such as foot drill, weapons handling (Skill at Arms), how to live and work outdoors (fieldcraft), navigation, leadership, first aid and how to tackle an assault course. In addition they develop their stamina and fitness.

On completing his or her initial training every soldier then moves to 11th Signal Regiment at Blandford Camp in Dorset to commence their trade training.

== Trade skills and training ==
=== Networks Engineer ===
Formerly, Cyber Network Engineer, Communications Systems Operator, Data Telegraphists and Radio Operators

Networks Engineer form the largest trade in the Royal Signals and are trained to prepare, configure, deploy and maintain Operational and Tactical communication systems to ensure frontline troops and their Commanders can communicate on Operations worldwide. They are able to engineer a range of systems including radios, satellite systems, computer networks and mobile communications as well as support a range of software applications and ICT. Their course at the Royal School of Signals lasts 28 weeks and covers the following disciplines:

- Area communications systems.
- Mobile multi-channel microwave radio relay.
- Civilian and military satellite communications.
- Public switched telephone networks.
- Network architecture.
- Routing protocols.
- Information systems training.
- Keyboard skills.
- Driver training for both Cat B+E/car and Cat C+E/large goods vehicles with trailer.

At the rank of Sergeant, Network Engineers may choose to apply to become Yeomen of Signals.

=== Information Services Engineer ===
Formerly Communication Systems Engineer (CSEng), formerly Systems Engineering Technicians (Techs) and Information Systems Engineers

Information Services Engineers are the technical experts of the Royal Signals. They install, maintain and repair the British Army's battlefield communication networks and information systems. Their course at the Royal School of Signals lasts 39 weeks. Their training includes the following elements:

- Basic computer software systems: how to install computer workstations into a systems network and then maintain, engineer and control these systems.
- Information systems: computer systems training, web development, database maintenance, app development, .
- Radio: HF to UHF and BOWMAN radio equipment, satellite and theatre-wide area digital communications networks.
- Teleconferencing: operating video teleconferencing equipment and digital telephone exchanges.
- Service management: providing help-desk support and troubleshooting.
- Driver training for both Cat B+E/car and Cat C+E/large goods vehicles with trailer.

At the rank of Corporal Information Services Engineers can be highlighted for potential supervisory roles. At the rank of Sergeant, Information Services Engineers may apply for selection for Foreman of Signals or Foreman of Signals (Information Systems).

The Foreman of Signals (FofS) deals with the technical aspect of Squadron life, working with the Squadron technical workshops, dealing with 1st and 2nd line inspections and holding and maintaining the Squadron Master Works Register (MWR) and technical inventory.

The Foreman of Signals (Information Systems) (FofS(IS)) deals with the information systems aspect of life within a squadron, arranging for information systems courses relevant to the Squadron assets, network management and the deployment and tracking of Squadron Information System equipment.

Whilst both supervisory trade groups act independently, there is a need for the two to interact and exchange information on a regular basis.

=== Communications Infrastructure Engineer ===
Formerly Installation Technician. Communications Infrastructure Engineers install, maintain and repair the Army's copper and fibre-optic networks, including cable infrastructures, telephony, local area networks, closed circuit television and video conferencing systems. Their course at the Royal School of Signals lasts 40 weeks and covers the following disciplines:

- Repairing, installing and maintaining telephone networks.
- Copper and fibre-optic cabling skills.
- Working at heights
- Driver training for both Cat B+E/car and Cat C+E/large goods vehicles with trailer.

=== Power Engineer ===
Formerly Royal Signals Electricians Power Engineers install, maintain and repair field-distribution power supplies and lighting. They are responsible for the mechanical and electrical repair of the Army's field generator systems. Their course at the Royal School of Signals lasts 25 weeks. It covers the following disciplines:

- Electrical engineering theory and practice: the skills required to repair and maintain power distribution equipment, generator and battery systems.
- Safety practices and procedures: preventing electrocution.
- Driver training for both Cat B+E/car and Cat C+E/large goods vehicles with trailer.

=== Supply Chain Operative ===
Formerly Communications Logistic Specialists, formerly Technical Supply Specialists and Driver Linesmen. Supply Chain Operatives are responsible for the storage and distribution of technical supplies, both on base and when deployed on operations. Managing technical stores is the core responsibility of this trade, but Supply Chain Operatives must have a thorough understanding of the communications equipment used by Royal Signals units. Their course at the Royal School of Signals lasts 13 weeks and covers the following disciplines:

- Manual accounting systems.
- Computer-based accounting systems.
- Warehouse management.
- Driver training for both Cat B+E/car and Cat C+E/large goods vehicles with trailer.

=== Electronic Warfare & Signals Intelligence Operator ===
Formerly Electronic Warfare Systems Operator. Electronic Warfare & Signals Intelligence Operators are responsible for intercepting and disrupting enemy voice and data communications. They deploy alongside Intelligence Corps linguists and analysts, and advice bomb disposal teams. They train on a 23-week course at the Royal School of Signals, followed by a five-week aptitude course and a 17-week Communications Exploitation course at the Defence College of Intelligence, Chicksands in Bedfordshire. Their training covers the following disciplines:

- Operating communications equipment. Learning to use HF, VHF, UHF and SHF radio equipment.
- Computer skills.
- Keyboard skills.
- Special message handling and intercept skills.
- Driver training for both Cat B+E/car and Cat C+E/large goods vehicles with trailer.

== Supervisory trades ==
Staff Sergeants and Warrant Officers work in one of five supervisory rosters:

- Yeoman of Signals (YofS)
- Yeoman of Signals (Electronic Warfare) (YofS(EW))
- Foreman of Signals (FofS)
- Foreman of Signals (Information Systems) (FofS(IS))
- Regimental Duty

Candidates for YofS and FofS are selected from the Communication Engineer trades and during training have the opportunity to complete Bachelors and master's degrees. Both are obtained through the Royal School of Signals Blandford whilst being validated by Bournemouth University.

== Subsequent employment ==
After basic and trade training most Royal Signals tradesmen are posted to the Field Army as Class 3 trained soldiers in the rank of Signaller. Electronic Warfare & Signals Intelligence Operators however, leave training as Lance Corporals. Information Services Engineer will leave Phase 2 as Signallers, but on completion of continuation training and Class 2 certification, will have accelerated promotion to Lance Corporal. After a year's experience all tradesmen become eligible for upgrading to Class 2 and a pay rise. Throughout their careers tradesmen attend further training courses (including upgrading to Class 1). Promotion is based on experience, ability and merit. Depending on their trade, upon reaching the rank of Sergeant, soldiers may apply to join one of the supervisory rosters, which brings extra responsibility and qualifications. Alternatively, soldiers from any trade may choose to follow a career path at Regimental Duty, in which they specialise in delivering military training and, if successful, fill roles such as Squadron Sergeant Major (SSM), Regimental Quartermaster Sergeant (RQMS) and Regimental Sergeant Major (RSM).

Soldiers from any trade can volunteer for service with 216 Parachute Signal Squadron, completing 'P' Company parachute training, as a Special Communicator with 299 Signal Squadron (Special Communications) or as a Special Forces Communicator with 18 (UKSF) Signal Regiment. A small number may undertake the All Arms Commando Course for service with UK Commando Force.

Signallers of all trades could previously apply to join the Royal Signals Motorcycle Display Team, better known as the White Helmets, however the White Helmets were disbanded at the end of 2017.

== Commissioning ==
Signallers may apply for commissioning, either as a Direct Entry officer undertaking the complete training package at Royal Military Academy Sandhurst, or as a Late Entry officer, undertaking a short commissioning course at Sandhurst. LE Officers are employed as Traffic Officers, Technical Officer (Telecommunications) or General Duties based on experience as a Yeoman of Signals, Foreman of Signals or Regimental Duty.

== See also ==
- List of roles in the British Army
