= Quartermaster sergeant =

Rank in some armies

Quartermaster sergeant (QMS) is a class of rank or appointment in some armed forces, especially those of the United Kingdom and the Commonwealth, and formerly also in the United States.

== Ireland ==
Quartermaster sergeant (Irish: ceathrúsháirsint) appointments in the Irish Defence Forces include:

- Battalion quartermaster sergeant
- Battery quartermaster sergeant
- Company quartermaster sergeant
- Flight quartermaster sergeant
- Regimental quartermaster sergeant
- Squadron quartermaster sergeant

== United Kingdom ==
A quartermaster sergeant in the British Army and Royal Marines is traditionally a non-commissioned officer or warrant officer who is responsible for supplies or stores. However, this definition is extended to almost any warrant officer class 2 who does not hold a sergeant major appointment, as well as a number of staff sergeant and colour sergeant appointments. In the British Army, quartermaster sergeants are frequently addressed and referred to as "Q". However, infantry company quartermaster sergeants are always addressed by their rank, as "Colour Sergeant" or "Colour", and not their appointment.

Examples of staff sergeant quartermaster sergeant appointments include:

- Battery quartermaster sergeant
- Company quartermaster sergeant
- Squadron quartermaster sergeant

Examples of warrant officer class 2 quartermaster sergeant appointments include:

- Artificer quartermaster sergeant
- Orderly room quartermaster sergeant
- Quartermaster sergeant instructor
- Regimental quartermaster sergeant
- Staff quartermaster sergeant
- Technical quartermaster sergeant

In the Household Cavalry, which does not use the term "sergeant", the designation is replaced with quartermaster corporal (QMC), as in squadron quartermaster corporal and regimental quartermaster corporal.

In the Royal Marines, quartermaster sergeant was an actual rank between colour sergeant and regimental sergeant major (and equivalent to warrant officer class II in the Army) until the Royal Marines themselves re-adopted the ranks of warrant officer class I and II in 1973 (although the term continued to be used interchangeably for warrant officers class II until at least 1981). Quartermaster sergeants could also hold the appointment of company sergeant major. The equivalent ranks in the Band Service were staff bandmaster and quartermaster sergeant bugler.

== United States ==
=== Early quartermaster sergeants ===
In 1776 the Continental Army established the rank of quartermaster sergeant as the second most senior soldier in the non-commissioned headquarters element of an infantry regiment. The regulations by General von Steuben officially gives the duties as:
"The Quartermaster Sergeant assisted the regimental quartermaster, assuming his duties in the quartermaster's absence and supervising the proper loading and transport of the regiment's baggage when on march."

The succeeding U.S. Army kept the rank. When the army formalised chevrons as rank insignia for their non-commissioned officers, quartermaster sergeants were given the insignia of a down-pointed chevron of worsted braid above the elbow of each arm in the same colour as the buttons of the regiment or corps. Although the Continental Marines did not have quartermaster sergeants, the U.S. Marine Corps introduced the rank when it was established, initially having only one quartermaster sergeant who was attached to the corps headquarters (like all NCOs above the rank of sergeant).

=== American Civil War ===
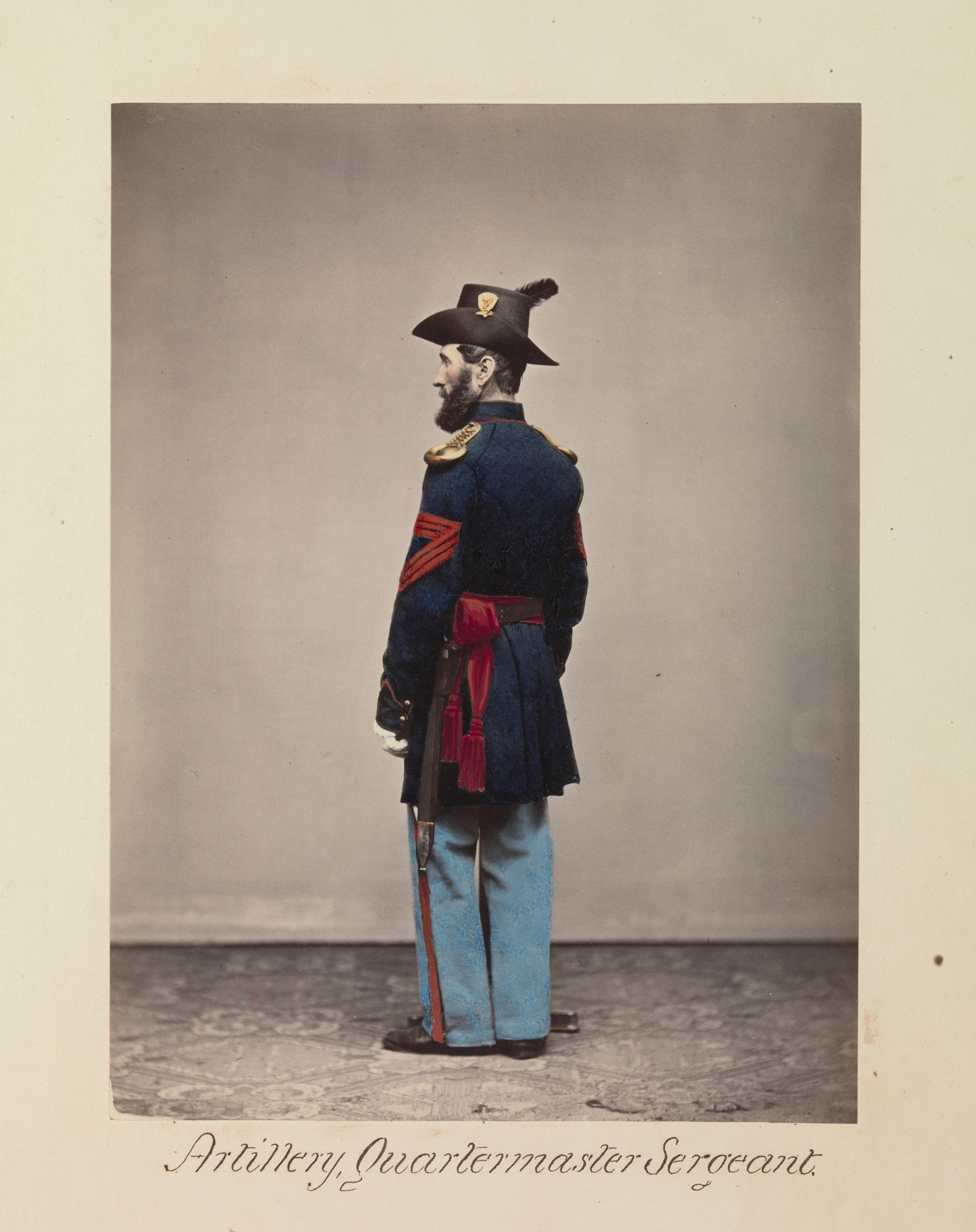
Union Army Quartermaster Sergeant, 1866

Confederate quartermaster sergeant stripes shown in red artillery color

The rank was in use by both the Union Army and the Confederate Army during the American Civil War. The rank was below sergeant major and above ordnance sergeant. The same rank insignia was used by both armies. Both armies varied the colour of the stripes by assigning red for artillery, yellow for cavalry, and blue for infantry. Some Confederate militia units varied these colours even further and had other colours; an example being the black stripes used by infantry units from North Carolina.

Each regiment or battalion was assigned a quartermaster sergeant as part of the staff, appointed by the commander from among the regiment's sergeants. Their task was to assist the quartermaster of the regiment with ordering, storing and distributing various equipage (clothing, tents, etc.) and maintaining appropriate records. Other tasks may have included overseeing the regimental train or work parties assigned to the regiment. Particularly with cavalry and artillery regiments, acquiring and distributing forage was an important function of the quartermaster sergeant.

Additionally, on 4 May 1861, each company of Union cavalry was authorised a company quartermaster sergeant. The company quartermaster sergeant was responsible for the company wagon and all the property it contained, including the tents, the company mess gear, the company desk, the company library, the ordnance, the subsistence provisions, and the company tools. He was further charged with overseeing the camp set-up of the tents and picket lines. He inspected the company horses and mules, and reported any problems to the veterinary surgeon of the regiment. He was also responsible for acquiring fuel, forage for the horses, and straw for bedding for the company. These were normally drawn from the supplies of the regimental quartermaster, along with replacements for uniforms and equipment. When they were not available from stores, the company quartermaster sergeant was responsible for forage parties to acquire them. The company quartermaster sergeant was required to sign for the uniforms and equipment that were in his custody and before disbursing these items to a soldier, he required a signature of receipt, countersigned by an officer.

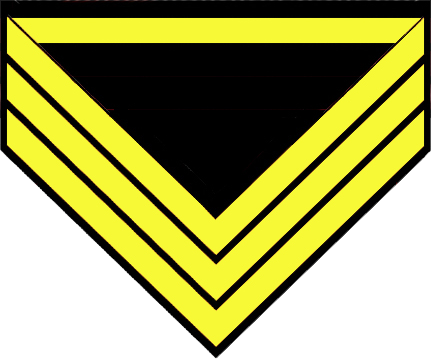
U.S. Cavalry company quartermaster chevrons

The rank of company quartermaster sergeant was not a command position, although he was required to know the drills and the duties and responsibilities of the line NCOs. He was the second most senior NCO in the company after the first sergeant. During combat, his place was safeguarding the company wagon and its supplies. He was generally required to fight only in defence of the company property. In an extreme emergency, he could be used to replace a fallen line NCO, but this was extremely rare. The wagons were driven by teamsters, who were usually members of the company. Also, each cavalry company was authorized a wagoneer with the rank of corporal.

The company quartermaster sergeant wore three chevrons with a single straight tie in worsted. Although worn by volunteer cavalry from 1862, this rank badge was not incorporated into United States military regulations until 1866. The rank and insignia were also used by the Confederate Army during the war. Likewise, a battery quartermaster sergeant was also authorised for every artillery battery. They began to adopt the same unofficial chevrons as the cavalry from May 1863.

Regimental Supply Sergeant chevrons

=== Later quartermaster sergeants ===
In 1889 the army began to appoint soldiers to the rank of post quartermaster sergeant. The authorised insignia consisted of three chevrons below a crossed key and quill. In 1916 the rank was renamed on the regimental level and now was the regimental supply sergeant. The insignia consisted of three chevrons (now pointed upwards since 1902) and a triple tie; initially all in the colours of the corps and in standard olive colour during World War I. However, additional quartermaster sergeants existed on company and battalion level. After the war the army overhauled its rank system during 1920, as it was too cumbersome with 128 different insignias. All variants of the quartermaster sergeant were discontinued in 1920.

== Sources ==
- The London Gazette. Her Majesty's Stationery Office.
- Tucker, Spencer C. (2014). The Encyclopedia of the Wars of the Early American Republic, 1783–1812: A Political, Social, and Military History, Vol. I. ABC-CLIO. ISBN 1-5988-4157-2.
- "History of U.S. Army Enlisted Ranks". The Institute of Heraldry. Office of the Administrative Assistant to the Secretary of the Army. Archived from the original on 2 March 2016.
- von Steuben, Gen. Friedrich (1779). Regulations for the Order and Discipline of the Troops of the United States. Department of the Continental Army.
