= Chief clerk =

Chief clerk may refer to:

- Clerk (legislature), the senior administrative officer of a legislature
- Chief Clerk of the California State Assembly, an officer of the California State Assembly
- Chief Clerk (United States Department of State), the second highest official of the Department of State from 1789 to 1853
- The senior clerk of any business, organisation, or department, often a senior official rather than a low-level administrative officer; now often obsolete
- The senior administrative non-commissioned officer or warrant officer of a British Army unit, often known as the orderly room sergeant
