= Samuel Meekosha =

- Born: 16 September 1893; Leeds, West Yorkshire
- Died: 8 December 1950 (aged 57); Blackwood, Monmouthshire
- Burial place: Glyntaff Crematorium, Pontypridd
- Military career
- Allegiance: United Kingdom
- Branch: British Army
- Rank: Major
- Units: West Yorkshire Regiment; Corps of Military Accountants; Royal Army Ordnance Corps
- Conflicts: World War I World War II
- Awards: Victoria Cross

Samuel Meekosha VC (16 September 1893 – 8 December 1950), who changed his name by deed poll to Samuel Ingham in 1942, was an English recipient of the Victoria Cross, the highest and most prestigious award for gallantry in the face of the enemy that can be awarded to British and Commonwealth forces.

== Biography ==
Samuel Meekosha was born in Leeds, although his family moved to Bradford when he was a baby, and Samuel always looked on that city as his home. Samuel's mother was English and he had a Polish father; he was proud of his Eastern European roots but was such a reluctant hero that in later life he changed his surname to Ingham, from his mother's maiden name of Cunningham.

He was 22 years old, and a corporal in the 1/6th Battalion, West Yorkshire Regiment (The Prince of Wales's Own), British Army based at Belle Vue Barracks, Manningham, Bradford when during the First World War the following deed took place for which he was awarded the VC.

On 19 November 1915 near the Yperlee Canal, near the village of Boesinghe (Boezinge), in Belgium, Corporal Meekosha was with a platoon of about 20 NCOs and men holding an isolated trench north of Ypres. During a very heavy bombardment six of the platoon were killed and seven wounded, while the rest were more or less buried. When there were no senior NCOs left in action Corporal Meekosha took command, sent for help and in spite of more big shells falling within 20 yards of him, continued to dig out the wounded and buried men in full view of and at close range from the enemy. He was assisted by Privates Johnson, Sayers and Wlkinson who were all awarded the DCM. Their courage saved at least four lives.

Meekosha was commissioned into the West Yorkshire Regiment in 1917. He was promoted lieutenant in 1918 and captain in 1919. He transferred to the Corps of Military Accountants in 1919, retiring in 1926. He rejoined the West Yorkshire Regiment as a captain in 1940 and transferred to the Royal Army Ordnance Corps, based in Leicestershire, later the same year. He was later promoted to major.

It was reported in the 3 April 2001 issue of The Times that James Morton, Sotheby's medal specialist, said: "Meekosha was a very modest man who was quite dismissive of the act that earned him the VC. He joined up for the Second World War and because of his unusual name people kept asking him: 'Aren't you the chap that won the VC?' In an attempt to stop the questions he changed his name [to Ingham] by deed poll in 1941 or 1942."

After the First World War he became a representative for the tobacco company John Player & Sons. He died at his home in Oakdale, Blackwood, Monmouthshire, on 8 December 1950. Cremated at Glyntaff Crematorium, Pontypridd, his ashes were claimed by his family and spread on Ilkley Moor in Yorkshire.

== The medal ==
His Victoria Cross was sold for £101,200 at Sotheby's on 3 May 2001
