= Daniel Khalife =

Former British Army soldier and terrorist

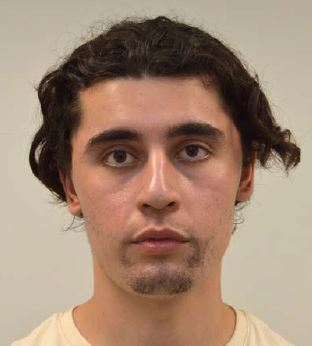
- Daniel Khalife's mugshot
- Born: Daniel Abed Khalife; 27 September 2001 (age 25); London, England
- Education: Teddington School
- Criminal charges: Breaching the Official Secrets Act, escaping lawful custody, terrorism
- Criminal penalty: 14 years and 3 months in prison
- Criminal status: Incarcerated
- Espionage activity
- Country: United Kingdom
- Allegiance: Iran
- Service years: 2018–2023

Daniel Abed Khalife (born 27 September 2001) is a former British Army network engineer and soldier. It is alleged that in January 2022 he left a fake explosive device on his desk, illegally accessed personal information about British soldiers, and shared that information and other classified documents with contacts in Iran. He was arrested on suspicion of breaching the Official Secrets Act and was bailed pending charges. In January 2023 he fled before being recaptured and held on remand. He was discharged from the army in May 2023.

On 6 September 2023 Khalife escaped from HM Prison Wandsworth in London and attempted to reconnect with an Iranian contact. A nationwide police search and delays at major transport hubs followed. After three days as a fugitive he was captured by the Metropolitan Police near Northolt in Middlesex. He was found guilty of spying for Iran in November 2024.

== Early life and career ==
Khalife was born on 27 September 2001 in London. His mother was born in Iran. For a while he lived in the Royal Borough of Kingston upon Thames. He attended Teddington School, a comprehensive school in Teddington, Greater London, where he was a talented runner. He left school in 2018.

Khalife joined the British Army in 2018 or 2019. He was a network engineer serving with the Royal Corps of Signals, and was based at Beacon Barracks in Stafford.

== Initial charges and imprisonment ==
In September 2018, soon after he joined the military, Khalife contacted an Iranian intelligence agent; although he claimed to have told MI6 that he wished to become a double agent, this was seen by prosecutors as a "cynical game" he was playing. He also contacted a man linked to the Islamic Revolutionary Guard Corps (IRGC) via Facebook and further built relationships with other Iranian contacts. During his military service, Khalife photographed a list containing the names of 15 soldiers, including some members of the elite Special Air Service (SAS) and Special Boat Service (SBS); it is believed that he sent the list to his Iranian contacts and later deleted the correspondence. Khalife denied these allegations. He also collected a "very large body of restricted and classified material" and appears to have sent Iran at least two classified documents, one of which containing information on drones, the other on "Intelligence, Surveillance & Reconnaissance". A forged document Khalife sent to the Iranians stated that His Majesty's Government refused to negotiate the release of Nazanin Zaghari-Ratcliffe, thereby putting her in danger. Zaghari-Ratcliffe was eventually released after an alleged UK debt of £400 million dating back to the 1970s was settled. Khalife received payment from the Iranians for the information he provided them, and was documented collecting US$2,000 (£1,500) left for him in a dog faeces bag in a park in North London.

On 6 January 2022 Khalife was arrested on suspicion of breaching the Official Secrets Act and was bailed and allowed to return to his army base.

He fled on 2 January 2023, but three weeks later he was arrested and charged with terror and explosives offences and remanded to HM Prison Wandsworth, a Category B men's prison, to await his trial. The offences related to two incidents in Staffordshire, one in August 2021 and one in January 2023.

Khalife appeared before Westminster Magistrates' Court on 7 February 2023 where details of the accusations were set out, including that he left canisters with wires at MOD Stafford on 2 January 2023 with the intent of "inducing in another the belief the item was likely to explode or ignite" and that he had accessed the Joint Personnel Administration to elicit personal information about soldiers "likely to be useful to a person committing or preparing an act of terrorism" in 2021. These offences were contrary to section 51 of the Criminal Law Act 1977 and contrary to section 58A of the Terrorism Act 2000 respectively.

He was discharged from the army in May 2023, following charges relating to terrorism and breaking the Official Secrets Act.

On 21 July 2023 Khalife appeared at the Old Bailey and pleaded not guilty to charges under the Official Secrets Act and the Terrorism Act. His trial was due to begin on 13 November 2023.

== Escape and police search ==
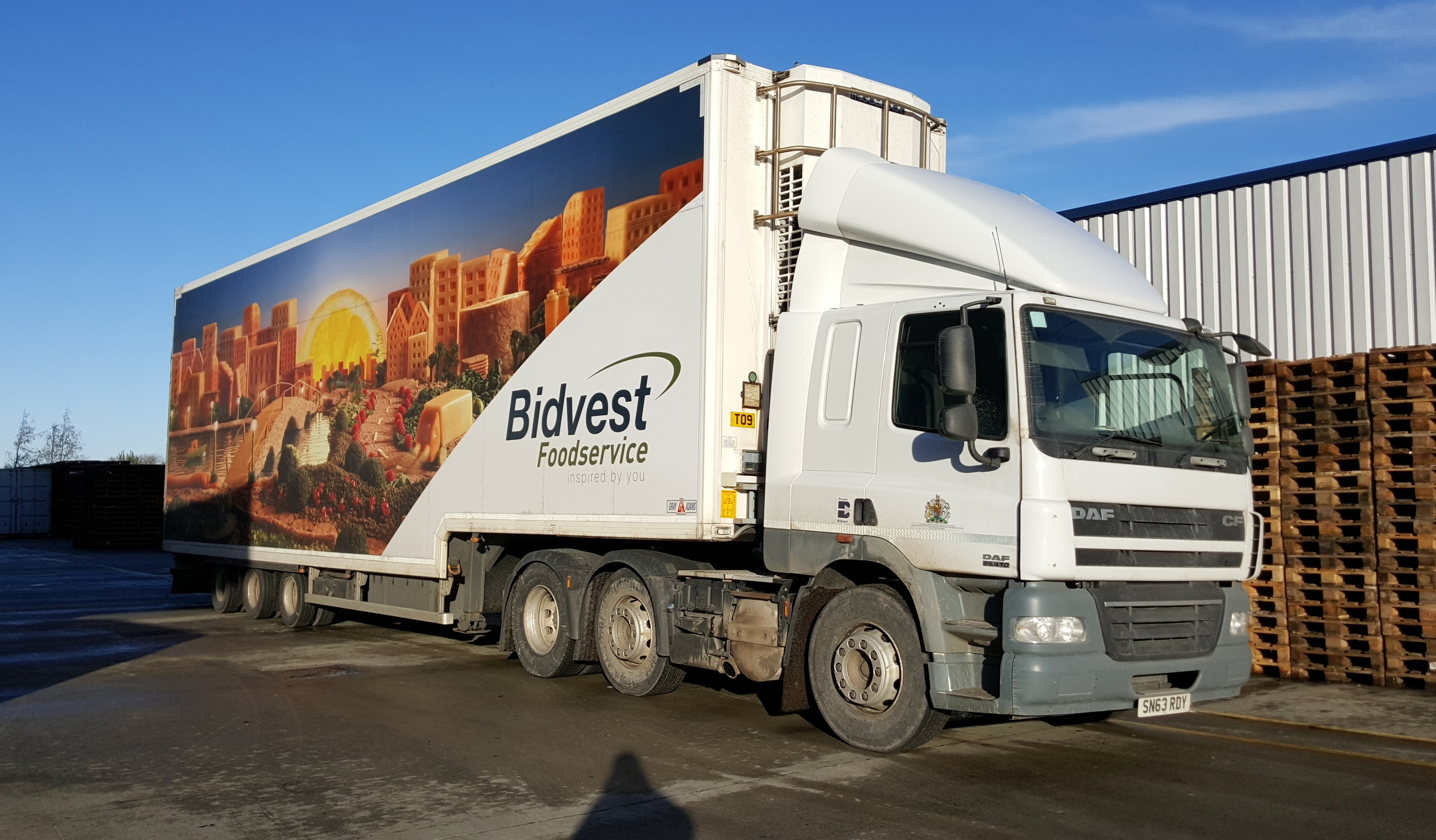
A Bidfood food delivery truck similar to the one used in the escape

On 6 September 2023 Khalife escaped from HM Prison Wandsworth in south west London, where he was being held on remand. He was said to have been working in the prison kitchen and was wearing a chef's uniform consisting of a white t-shirt, red and white chequered trousers and brown steel-toe cap boots. The Metropolitan Police (Met) believe that Khalife escaped by strapping himself to the underside of a food delivery van using a material which was "made from bedsheets with clips at each end". A food supply vehicle had left the prison at 7:30 am and contingency plans for an "unaccounted prisoner" were activated at 7:50 am, including the lockdown of the prison and informing the police. At 8:37 am police stopped the food van in East Putney, and discovered strapping—possibly made from bedsheets—beneath it.

A police search was begun, and additional security checks at British airports and ports were put in place. During the night of 7–8 September Richmond Park, the largest park in Greater London, was closed while the Met undertook a search; this included using helicopters with thermographic technology to search for body heat. The Met said that 150 officers were involved in the search, in addition to police from other forces and officers from the Border Force. From 8 September a reward of up to £20,000 was offered for information leading to Khalife's arrest.

At 5 pm on 8 September police confirmed a sighting of Khalife in south-west London on the morning of the escape. They stated that a man fitting Khalife's description was seen walking away from a Bidfood van near Wandsworth Roundabout shortly after his escape; the man then walked towards Wandsworth town centre.

== Capture and subsequent charges ==
On the morning of 9 September 2023 the Met reported that Khalife had been sighted overnight in the Chiswick area of London.

A plain-clothed officer was informed that Khalife had been seen on a bicycle on the Grand Union Canal towpath near Rowdell Road in Northolt. The officer attended, drew his Taser, and ordered Khalife to dismount the bicycle. Khalife was arrested at 10:41 am on suspicion of being unlawfully at large and escaping lawful custody, approximately 14 miles (23 km) from HM Prison Wandsworth. In his possession was a mobile phone and a bag containing money and receipts which suggested that he had purchased clothes and credit for the mobile phone which he used to message an Iranian contact, simply stating "I wait".

On 10 September the Metropolitan Police confirmed Khalife had been charged with escaping from lawful custody in relation to escaping from Wandsworth. He appeared before Westminster Magistrates Court on 11 September, where he was remanded in custody until 29 September when he will appear at the Old Bailey. Following the hearing he was taken from court to HM Prison Belmarsh, a category A prison. On 21 September Khalife appeared in court from Belmarsh via a videolink and pleaded not guilty to escaping from lawful custody. On 21 December a new trial date was set to begin from 7 October 2024.

== Reaction to escape ==
On 7 September 2023 Alex Chalk, Secretary of State for Justice, ordered an investigation into the escape with a preliminary report being requested to be ready by the end of the week. This will include investigating the vehicle in question, whether other prisoners could enact a similar escape, and how Khalife was assigned to the kitchen, usually a valued job given to trusted prisoners, where he had access to knives and a potential escape route. On 8 September Sir Mark Rowley, Commissioner of Police of the Metropolis, described the escape as "clearly pre-planned", and that the police were investigating whether he was assisted in his escape by other prisoners, prison officers or people from outside the prison.

Charlie Taylor, His Majesty's Chief Inspector of Prisons, said that there are "too many prisoners in Wandsworth for the amount of staff who are there". Inspectors also stated that "more than 30% of prison officers were either absent or unable to work their full duties." On 9 May 2024 Taylor wrote to the Secretary of State for Justice to urge him to put the prison into emergency measures after an inspection raised concerns about ongoing failings in security at Wandsworth.

On 10 September 2023 Chalk confirmed that approximately 40 inmates had been transferred from Wandsworth following a review after Khalife's escape from the prison.

On 15 September 2023, figures published by the Ministry of Justice indicated that 80 prison officers (around 39% of the workforce) were absent from Wandsworth Prison on the morning of Khalife's escape. However, His Majesty's Government said staffing levels were "above the minimum" needed and officials later clarified that fewer than five of the absences were unauthorised.

== Change of plea and conviction ==
On 11 November 2024 Khalife changed his plea to guilty for the charge of escaping lawful custody. On 28 November he was found guilty of spying for Iran. He had contacted Iranian intelligence, and had also contacted the British security services to offer himself as a double agent. On 3 February 2025 he was sentenced to 14 years and 3 months in prison.
