= Music director =

Person responsible for the musical aspects of a performance

A music director, musical director or director of music is a person responsible for the musical aspects of a performance, production, or organization. This would include the artistic director and usually chief conductor of an orchestra or concert band, the director of music of a film, the director of music at a radio station, the person in charge of musical activities or the head of the music department in a school, the coordinator of the musical ensembles in a university, college, or institution (but not usually the head of the academic music department), the head bandmaster of a military band, the head organist and choirmaster of a church, or an organist and master of the choristers (the title given to a director of music at a cathedral, particularly in England).

== Orchestra ==
The title of "music director" or "musical director" is used by many symphony orchestras to designate the primary conductor and artistic leader of the orchestra. The term "music director" is most common for orchestras in the United States. With European orchestras, the titles of "principal conductor" or "chief conductor" are more common, which designate the conductor who directs the majority of a given orchestra's concerts in a season. In musical theatre and opera, the music director is in charge of the overall musical performance, including ensuring that the cast knows the music thoroughly, supervising the musical interpretation of the performers and pit orchestra, and conducting the orchestra.

The artistic director refers to someone who directs a musical ensemble and is the primary leader in the implementation of all artistic plans. In most countries the title is generally understood to be equivalent or interchangeable with that of music director, and carries the corresponding responsibilities of directing (conducting or rehearsing) the ensemble, programming repertoire and performers, and (often) cultivating an artistic vision and often a long-term artistic strategy for the organization. The title and corresponding position is understood to be the highest level of artistic or musical decision-making inside the hierarchy of the organization, often working with an administrative counterpart such as an Executive Director, managing director, or CEO. Some organizations, including some large orchestras, opt to have a primary conductor who reports to an artistic director in charge of long-range planning and artistic decision-making outside of that directly related to the rehearsal and performance process.

In the 20th century, the title and position of music director typically brought with it an almost unlimited influence over the particular orchestra's affairs. As implied by the name, the music director not only conducts concerts, but also controls what music the orchestra will perform or record, and has much authority regarding hiring, firing, and other personnel decisions over an orchestra's musicians. Such authoritarian rule, once expected and even thought necessary for a symphonic ensemble to function properly, has loosened somewhat in the closing decades of the 20th century with the advent and encouragement of more power sharing and cooperative management styles (with the orchestra musicians themselves, the administrative staff, and volunteer board of directors). The music director in American lingo also assists with fund-raising, and also is the primary focus of publicity for the orchestra, as what is often called its "public face".

The term "music director" or "musical director" became common in the United States in the middle of the 20th century, following an evolution of titles. Early leaders of orchestras were simply designated as the "conductor." In the 1920s and 1930s, the term musical director began to be used, in order to delineate the fact that the person in this position was doing much more than just conducting, and to differentiate them from guest conductors who simply led one particular program or concert. George Szell, for instance, was appointed as "musical director" of the Cleveland Orchestra in 1946, and his position was so named until his death in 1970. His successor, Lorin Maazel, was given the title "music director." Other major American orchestras kept more current with the times and began using the simpler term in the 1950s and 1960s.

The term can also refer to the person who directs a school band or heads the music program.

== Film and theatre ==
Alternatively, the term "music director" used to appear in the film credits for a professional hired to supervise and direct the music selected for a film or music documentary, but today the more common designation is music supervisor.

=== India ===
In India, where many films are produced as musicals, the term "music director" is commonly used for the composer and music producer of the songs and score used in the film. Their roles also entail arranging, mastering, mixing and supervising recording of film music with conducting and orchestration. Usually, another artist will receive the credit for the lyrics of the songs.

=== Theatrical productions ===
The "music director" for a theatrical production or Broadway or West End musical often serves as rehearsal pianist and conductor. This music director is often also the vocal coach, may also be involved in arranging material for new works, or collaborate on underscoring. There was a Tony Award category for Best Musical Director beginning in 1948, but it was discontinued in 1964 in part due to the fluid responsibilities of musical directors.

== Broadcasting ==
A music director of a radio station is responsible for interacting with record company representatives, auditioning new music, offering commentary, and making decisions (sometimes in conjunction with the program director) as to which songs get airplay, how much and when. In college radio, there may be more than one music director, as students usually volunteer only a few hours each per week, and most stations have a diverse and extensive library of several different music genres.

== Military ==
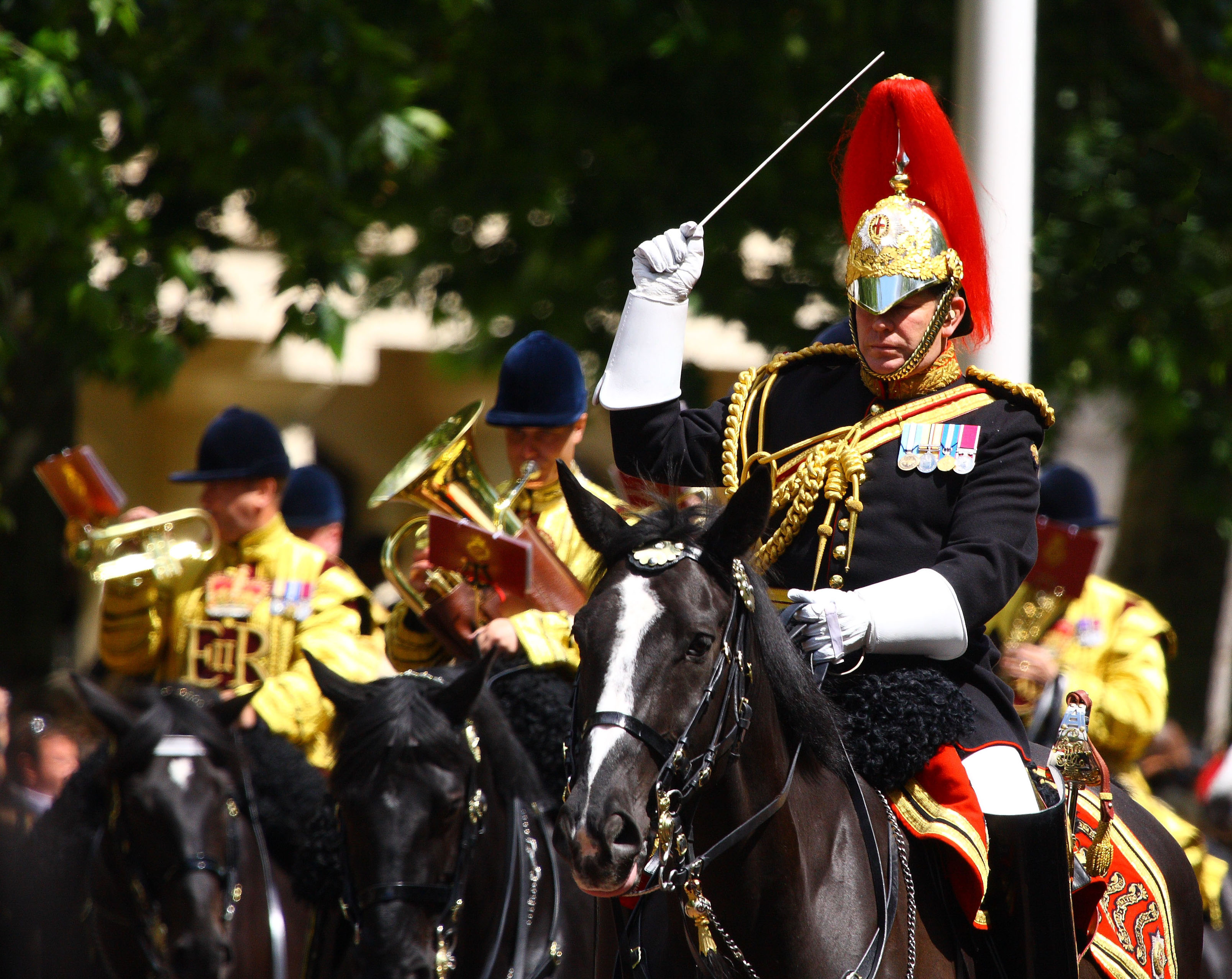
Major Tim Cooper, Director of Music of The Blues and Royals mounted band in London.

In the British Armed Forces, a director of music is a commissioned officer, always a musician commissioned from the ranks, who leads a military band. A non-commissioned officer or warrant officer who leads a band is called a bandmaster.

== Pop music ==
In pop music, a musical director or "MD" is responsible for supervising the musical arrangements and personnel for a touring artist. This can include festivals and televised performances as well as those at traditional on-stage venues. In the modern era, the sound of a studio recording is often impossible or impractical to reproduce on stage, and it is the music director's job to assemble musicians and arrangements to adapt that material to a live setting (which may or may not include playback of prerecorded tracks). The music director generally leads rehearsals as well as each performance, allowing the lead artist to focus on performing.

== Germany and Austria ==
Generalmusikdirektor (GMD, general music director) is a German title for the artistic director of an orchestra, an institution or a town.

A music director (Latin: director musices) was originally the title of the person responsible for music in a town in Germany and Austria. Johann Sebastian Bach was music director in Leipzig, Georg Philipp Telemann and later Carl Philipp Emanuel Bach were music directors in Hamburg, Robert Schumann was music director in Düsseldorf.

Generalmusikdirektor is a title given by larger towns to a person typically responsible for a symphony orchestra and the opera. The first person with this title was Gaspare Spontini in Berlin in 1819. Daniel Barenboim was Generalmusikdirektor of the Staatsoper Unter den Linden in Berlin from 1992 to 2023.

== Other uses ==
Brass bands, wind bands, choirs, opera companies and other ensembles may also have musical directors.

== See also ==
- Kapellmeister
- Category:Music directors (opera)
