= Artificer sergeant major =

Commonwealth military appointment

Artificer sergeant major (ASM) is a senior warrant officer appointment in the technical branches of the British, New Zealand and Australian Armies.

== British Army ==
Artificer sergeant major is an appointment held by a warrant officer class 1 in the Royal Electrical and Mechanical Engineers (REME), the corps of the British Army whose function is the repair and recovery of all mechanical and electrical equipment. The ASM is normally the senior tradesman in large REME units and is the technical advisor to the unit; the senior tradesman in smaller units such as light aid detachments is normally a warrant officer class 2 (artificer quartermaster sergeant). An ASM must have passed the artificer training course and served as an artificer electronics/weapons/vehicles or similar discipline as a staff sergeant and warrant officer class 2 (holding the appointment of artificer quartermaster sergeant) prior to promotion to WO1.

== Australian Army ==
The title is also used in the Australian Army in the Royal Australian Electrical and Mechanical Engineers (RAEME), and applies to the senior soldier (tradesman) in the brigade administration support battalion, or combat service support battalion, or workshop troop, or technical support unit. The appointment may be held by a warrant officer class 1 or 2.
