= Sergeant major signals =

Appointment in the British Army

Sergeant major signals (SMS) is a British Army appointment, formerly known as sergeant major instructor signals (SMIS). Normally a warrant officer class 2 in the British Army, selection for this post was the culmination of many years of experience with modern radio communications systems. During their careers it was possible to be trained in several evolving systems for example the movement from Larkspur and Clansman to the more recent Bowman radio communication equipment. Their duties included training personnel by the development and execution of in-house and in-theatre courses, keeping their signal sergeants up-to-date with amendments to policies and equipment, equipment husbandry, equipment procurement and high level custodian protection of electronic and paper codes. They had to produce communications electronic instructions containing relevant daily frequencies and associated information for radio operators.

Generally the SMS would be housed in the regimental training wing and was given numerous other roles to fulfil by the unit training officer. The SMS normally had a secondary roll as a troop sergeant major.

A sergeant major signals wore a warrant officer's crown on his sleeve.

A typical career ladder would be: basic training followed by a basic radio communicators course of approximately 3 weeks duration. Progress to an advanced level of about 4 – 6 weeks duration followed after roughly 3 or more years field experience. The soldier would also have to attend a junior cadre course, which built on basic soldiering skills and was a necessary step for selection for their first promotion. As they were competing for their second promotion the soldier would be selected to attend an assistant regimental instructor's course of approximately 6–8 weeks duration. This would supply individual companies (or similar sub-units) with experienced training staff. The assistant regimental instructor's course was a pre-requisite to selection for their third promotion to the signal sergeant's post but not as a pre-requisite for promotion to sergeant which was justified by the completion of the Education for Promotion Certificate. They would also have to attend the crew commander's course which was a more thorough cadre and be selected for further promotion by selection from other competing corporals (or equivalent). This was based on a scoring system derived from the confidential report forms that were annually completed since promotion to corporal.

Once a sergeant was employed as a signals sergeant for approximately 4 years he/she could gain further promotion by selection from other competing signal sergeants. This was based on a scoring system derived from the confidential report forms that were annually completed since promotion to sergeant. They would also have to pass the Education for Promotion Certificate Level 2.

Promotion to the role of SMS could be while still as a sergeant awaiting further promotion (but having been informed of that promotion). This may have been because of an inhibiting factor such as an outgoing SMS still in his post but awaiting to be posted elsewhere. In most cases where this happened the sergeant could be given a local (unpaid) promotion. Once the outgoing SMS had left the sergeant would be promoted to either staff sergeant or warrant officer. Providing a SMS gave a good account of his duties and he was a staff sergeant, his subsequent promotion to warrant officer class II would generally follow at the next promotions board.

A SMS could then be selected for further promotions to company sergeant major, battery sergeant major, regimental quartermaster sergeant, regimental sergeant major or regimental sergeant major instructor.
