= Bandmaster =

Leader and conductor of a band

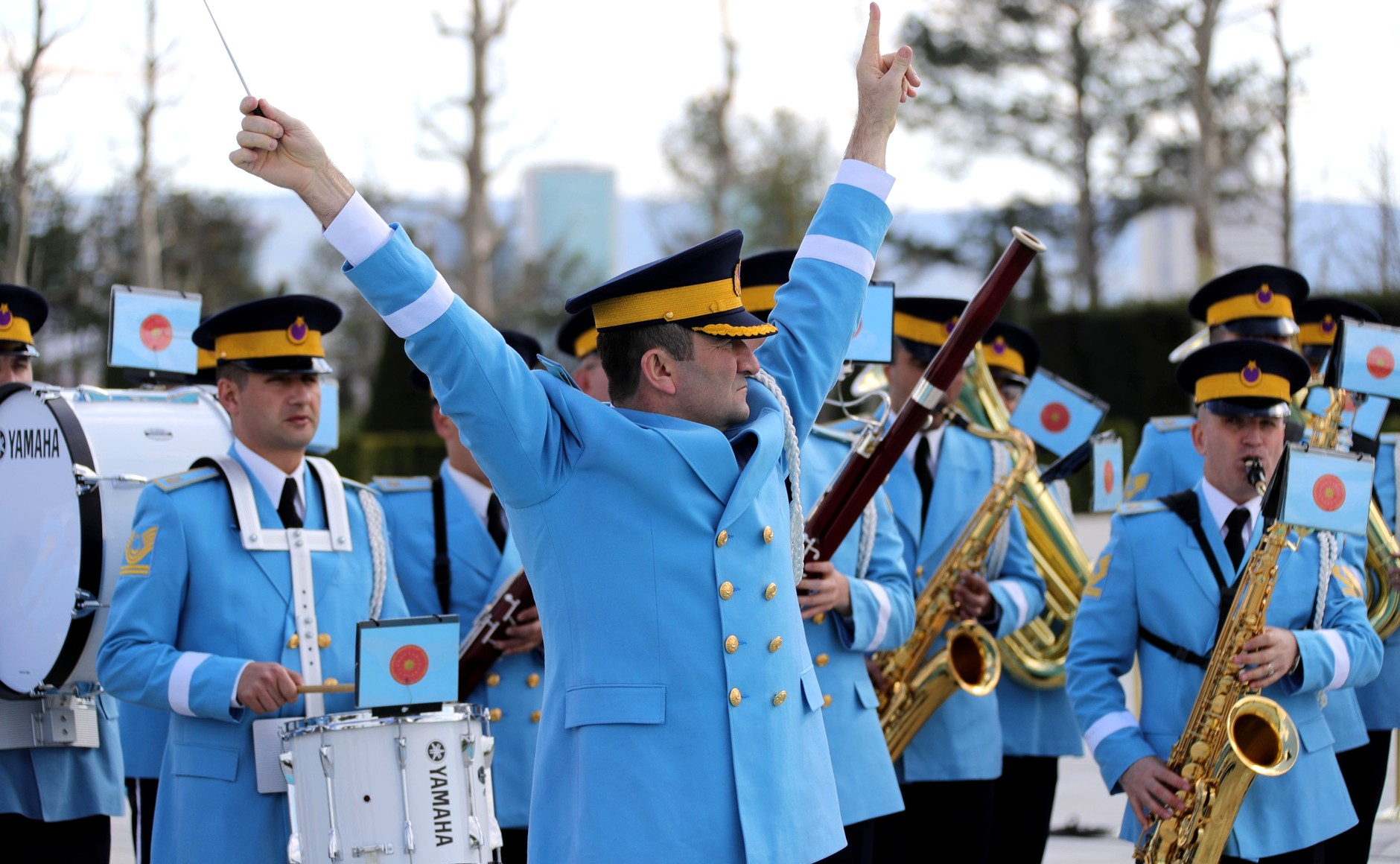
A Turkish Armed Forces bandmaster.

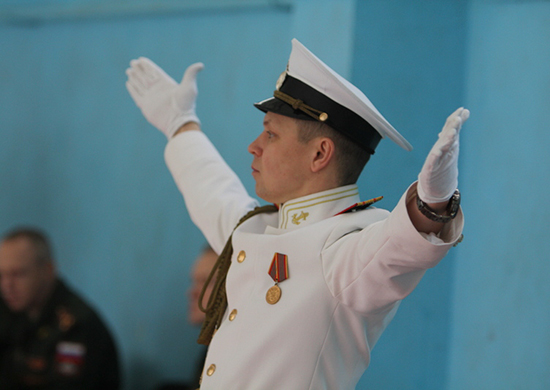
Captain Ilya Sergeev, bandmaster of the Military Band of the Pacific Fleet of the Russian Navy.

A bandmaster is the leader and conductor of a band, usually a concert band, military band, brass band or a marching band.

== British Armed Forces ==
In the British Army, bandmasters of the Royal Corps of Army Music now hold the rank of staff sergeant, warrant officer class 2 or warrant officer class 1. A commissioned officer who leads a band is known as the director of music. Directors of music are all former bandmasters who have been commissioned. All bandmasters initially joined the Army as musicians and were selected for bandmaster training from non-commissioned rank (usually having reached the rank of at least corporal). However, unlike most NCOs, bandmasters are promoted directly to staff sergeant on completion of their bandmaster training and have not necessarily worked their way through all the intervening ranks.

British Army line infantry and cavalry regimental bands were led by bandmasters until the reorganisation of bands and the creation of the Corps of Army Music in 1994. The larger corps bands, as well as those of the Foot Guards and Household Cavalry, were known as staff bands, and were led by a commissioned director of music with a bandmaster as his deputy. In 1994, the number of bands was reduced and all bands became staff bands, effectively putting an end to the rank of 'bandsman' used in regimental line bands (the rank in staff bands being known as 'musician').

Bandmasters qualified before the reorganisation in 2014 were always immediately promoted to the rank of warrant officer class 1, with the designation of WO1(BM). They wear a unique appointment badge of a crowned lyre in a wreath underneath the WO1's badge (the Royal Arms of the United Kingdom). The senior playing musician of the band is normally the band sergeant major (or band corporal major in the Household Cavalry), a warrant officer class 2, although bandmasters (who are also appointed as training instructors) are expected to play within sections as and when required.

Royal Marines Bands have been led by commissioned directors of music for many years. Bandmaster is an appointment which may be held by a warrant officer class 1 (WO1 BDMR), who is equivalent to an Army bandmaster, or a warrant officer class 2 (WO2 BDMR), who is equivalent to an Army band sergeant major. The Corps Bandmaster is the senior bandmaster of the Royal Marines and the chief non-commissioned adviser to the Principal Director of Music, Royal Marines. Until the introduction of warrant officers to the Royal Marines in 1973, the rank of bandmaster was equivalent to colour sergeant and that of staff bandmaster to quartermaster sergeant (equivalent to a warrant officer class 2), and there were no warrant officer class 1 equivalents in the Band Service, although in 1969 the rank of band colour sergeant replaced bandmaster.

Royal Air Force bands have also traditionally been led by commissioned directors of music. The bandmaster is a warrant officer and fills the same position as the Army equivalent (RAF WOs do not hold appointments as do those in the other services and the RAF only has a single WO rank, equivalent to WO1 in the other services). The senior playing musician, the band sergeant, is a flight sergeant.

== United States Army ==
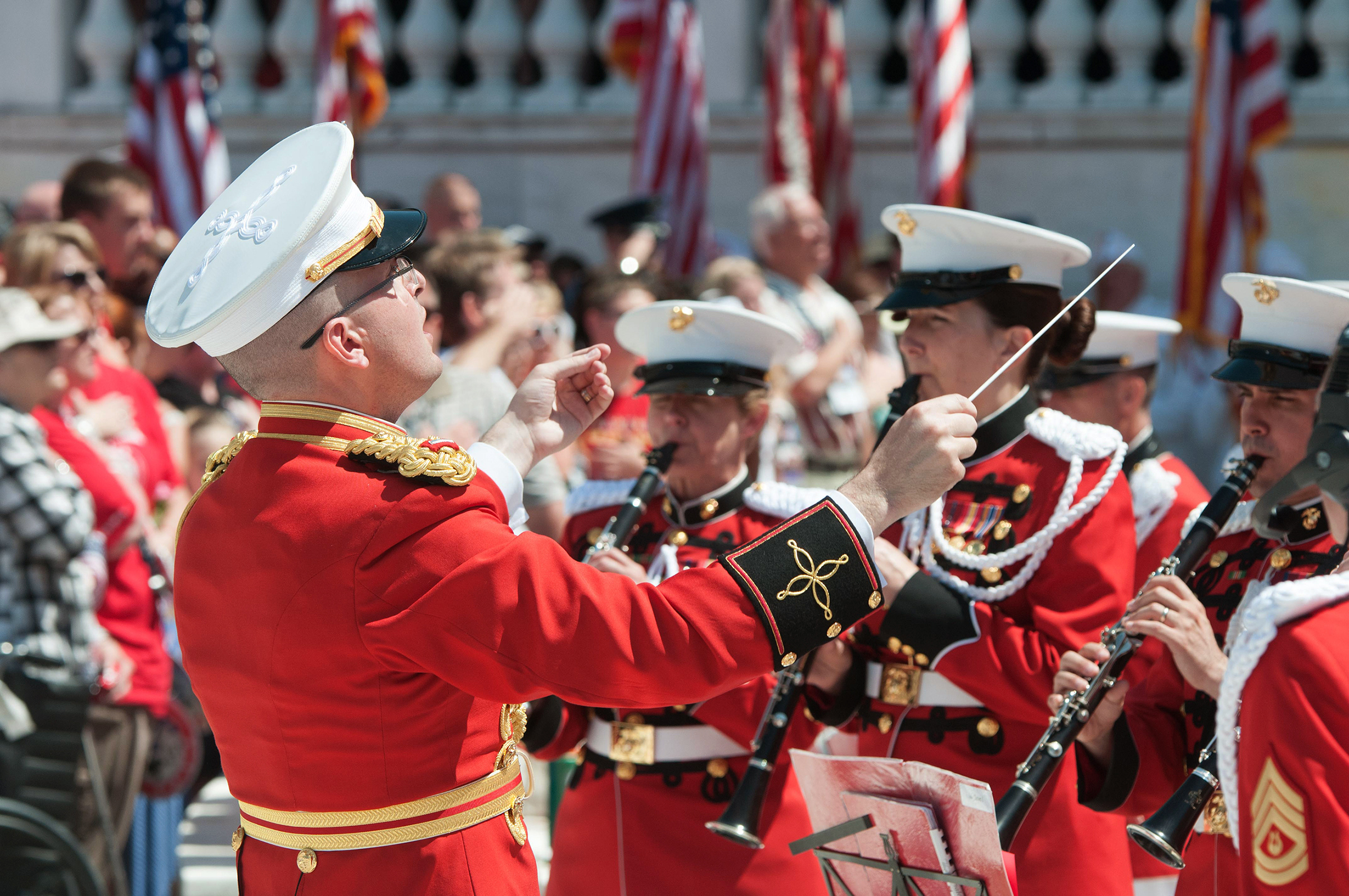
A bandmaster of the United States Marine Band on Memorial Day.

In the United States Army, a bandmaster of division and army garrison bands is typically a warrant officer or a chief warrant officer. A commissioned officer typically leads major command and/or special bands. The most recent manning documents have commissioned officers at 1st Armored Division, Ft. Bliss, TX and at 25th Infantry Division, Schofield Barracks, HI. A warrant officer is typically commander of the Old Guard Band.

Warrant officer and chief warrant officer bandmasters are former enlisted musicians who have undergone rigorous in-service training in musical skills, conducting skills and military leadership. They are seconded in their individual bands by the senior enlisted bandmember, usually a first sergeant or sergeant major, who is designated enlisted bandleader.

== Salvation Army ==
Bandmaster is a non-commissioned (or local) officer rank in the Salvation Army. A Salvation Army bandmaster is responsible for the ministry of a Salvation Army band and tends to the musical and spiritual development of the bandsmen and women. The bandmaster is assisted by a deputy bandmaster, band sergeant, and band secretary. These roles are also non-commissioned officer ranks. The band may also have a band colour sergeant and a band librarian. All of these roles will normally be undertaken by volunteer Salvationists who give their time and services free of charge. Charles Fry was the first Salvation Army bandmaster.

== Cruise ships ==
The term bandmaster is also used in the cruising industry to describe the onboard musical director, responsible for musical direction for all onboard theatre shows with guest artists and for production shows, writing and arranging for the orchestras as well as band discipline.

== See also ==
- Bandleader
- Drum major (marching band)
- Drum major (military)
