= Bidfood =

UK wholesaler and distributor

BFS Group Limited
- Trade name: Bidfood
- Formerly: Snowdon & Bridge Limited (1929–1985); Snowdon And Bridge Limited (1985–1991); Booker Fitch Food Services Limited (1991–1995); Booker Foodservice Group Limited (1995–1999)
- Company type: Subsidiary
- Industry: Foodservice distribution Logistics
- Founded: May 22, 1929; 97 years ago
- Headquarters: Slough, Buckinghamshire, England
- Key people: Brian Joffe (founded Bidvest); Bernard Berson (CEO of BidCorp); David Cleasby (CFO of BidCorp)
- Revenue: £2.3 billion (2024)
- Net income: £34.9 million (2024)
- Parent: Bid Corporation JSE: BID

BFS Group Limited, trading as Bidfood, is a foodservice wholesaler and distributor based in the United Kingdom.

The BFS Group Limited was a wholly owned subsidiary of Bidvest, an international services, trading and distribution company listed on the JSE Securities Exchange in South Africa. It is now a wholly owned subsidiary of BidCorp, also listed on the JSE. BidCorp, the Bid Corporation Limited, is the holding company of the Bidvest Group Limited.

== History ==
logo used from 1999 to 2010

logo used from 2010 to 2015

Logo introduced in July 2015

BFS Group, trading as Booker Foodservice, was originally owned by Booker Group, having been formed through a series of acquisitions and mergers. In May 1999 Booker sold the company to Bidvest Group, in November of that year the company was re-branded as 3663, with the slogan "First for foodservice". The name "3663" spells "food" on a telephone keypad and is pronounced "three double-six three".

In 2003 BFS Group acquired Swithenbank, a fruit and vegetable supplier based in Bradford, and Wilson Watson, a catering equipment supplier which was subsequently rebranded as 3663 Catering Equipment.

In 2006, as BFS Group Ltd., the company challenged the proposed award of a Ministry of Defence (MoD) food supply contract to a competitor. BFS' case was that the Defence Logistics Organisation, part of the MoD, had failed to act fairly or transparently, had acted unlawfully by failing to undertake any negotiation with BFS, and that the bid evaluation criteria had not been applied fairly. The challenge was unsuccessful. The case was the first time the UK courts had looked at the legal requirements for seeking to award a contract using the "negotiated procedure" within the Public Contracts Regulations.

In 2009 the company acquired Giffords Fine Foods.

In 2010 the operations of the company were separated into two distinct divisions, 3663 and Bidvest Logistics.

In 2011 the 3663 brand was re-branded with a new logo, vehicle livery and slogan, "inspired by you". In June of that year Inverness Farmers, a local wholesaler in the Highlands of Scotland which had started as a milk supplier, was acquired.

In July 2012 BFS Group acquired Oban-based wholesaler Forteith Foodservice, a family run partnership which operated in the Argyll area. In October South Lincs Foodservice, a wholesaler operating in Lincolnshire, was fully acquired, after purchasing a minority holding earlier in the year. In September 2012 the acquired businesses of Giffords Fine Foods and Swithenbank were merged to form Swithenbank Fresh & Fine Foods, to operate as a single fresh produce division within 3663.

In February 2014 3663 was re-branded as Bidvest 3663.

In July 2015 Bidvest 3663 was re-branded as Bidvest Foodservice, meaning the "3663" name ceased to be used in any branding by the company after more than 15 years of use.

On 16 February 2016, Bidvest Foodservice announced it would change its name to Bidfood. The change follows the separation of the global Bidvest Foodservice businesses from the Bidvest Group, when it listed independently on the Johannesburg Stock Exchange in May last year. The change took effect from 3 April 2017. The listing meant that Bidvest Foodservice UK, along with the other Bidvest Foodservice businesses around the world, have all changed their name to Bidfood reflect this.

In September 2023, a company refrigerated food truck was on a routine delivery at HM Prison Wandsworth when a prisoner and terror suspect Daniel Khalife escaped by hitching a ride underneath the chassis of the vehicle.

== Operations ==
In the financial year ended 30 June 2024, the company reported turnover of £3.2 billion with £34.9 million profit after tax.

=== Bidvest Foodservice ===
The Bidvest Foodservice division of the company operates as a foodservice wholesaler supplying fresh, frozen, ambient and non-food products to customers in a wide range of sectors within the foodservice and catering industry; including local authorities, NHS trusts, defence contractors, hotel and restaurant chains as well as many independent operators in the hospitality industry. Bidvest Foodservice operates a fleet of around 850 temperature-controlled delivery vehicles, delivering fresh, chilled, and frozen goods out of 23 depots, and 4 regional distribution centres across the United Kingdom. It has 5 major offices across the country.

=== Bidvest Logistics ===
Bidvest Logistics provided distribution and supply chain services to larger operators in the foodservice industry, including many well-known restaurant and fast-food brands. It was rebranded as Best Food Logistics in 2018, and in 2020 was sold to Booker Group, a subsidiary of Tesco; Best Food Logistics became a division of Booker Direct.

== Gallery ==
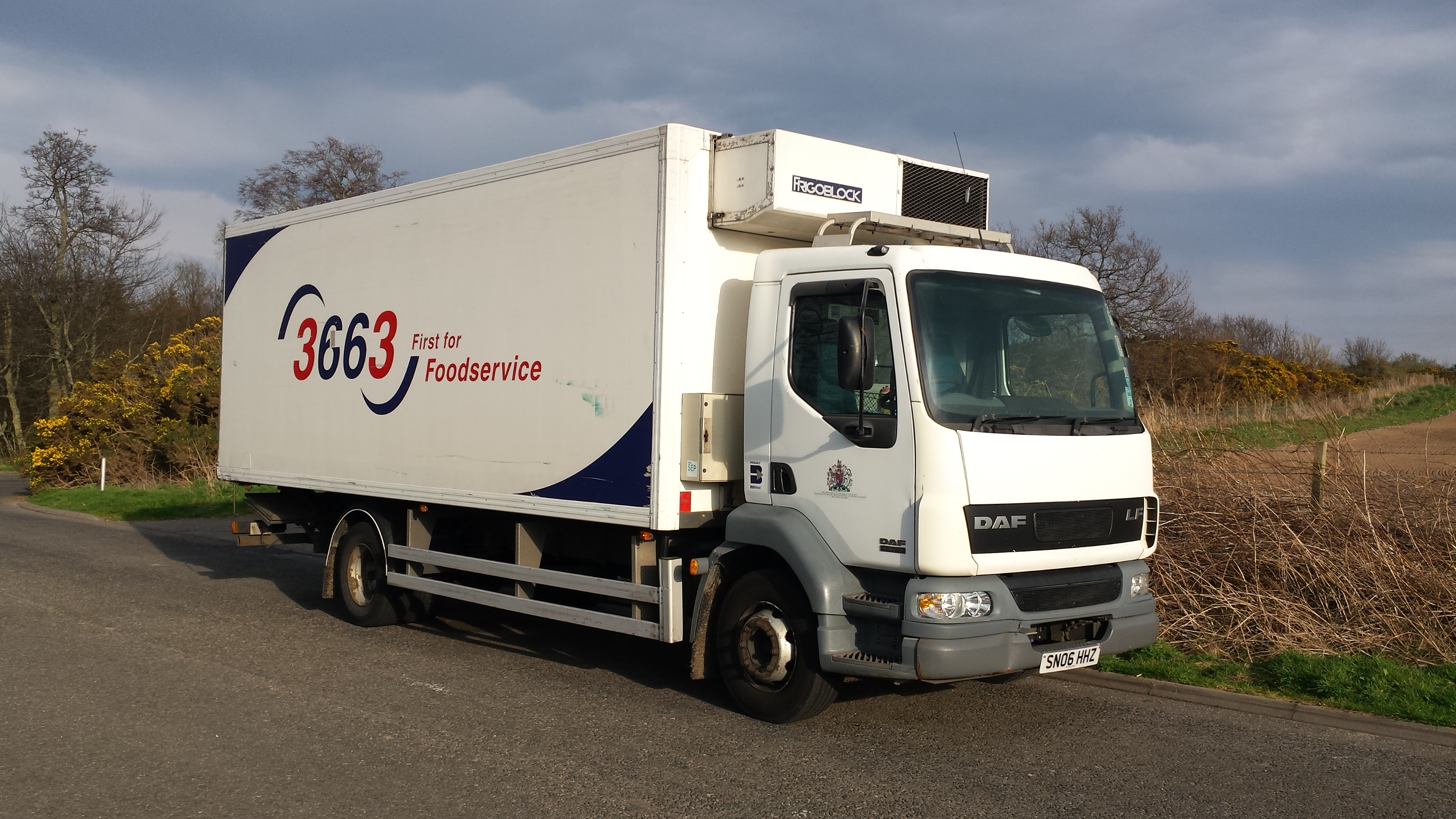
DAF LF in the 1999-2010 3663 livery

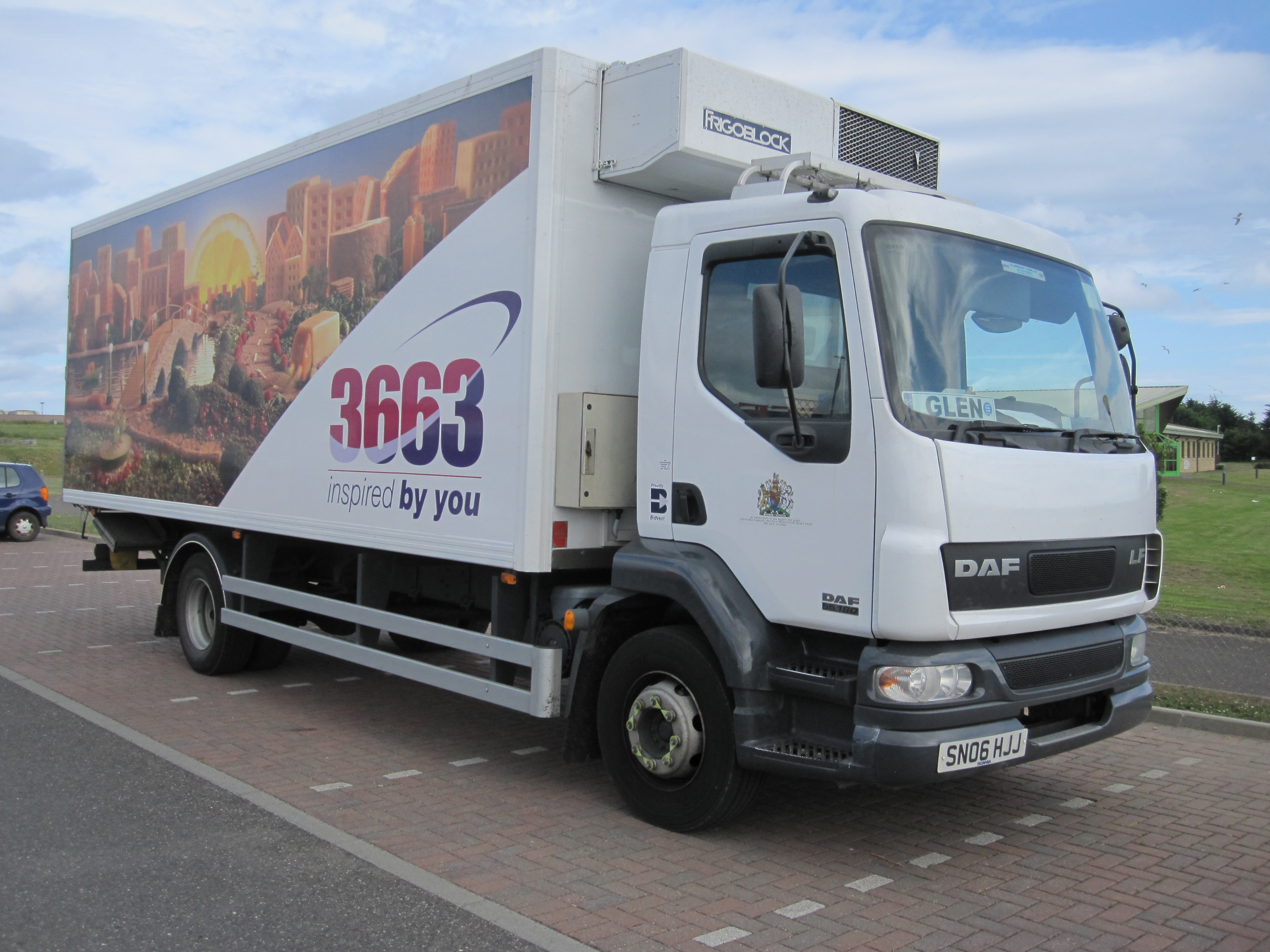
DAF LF in the 2010–2015 3663 livery, including a "landscape" made up of various food products

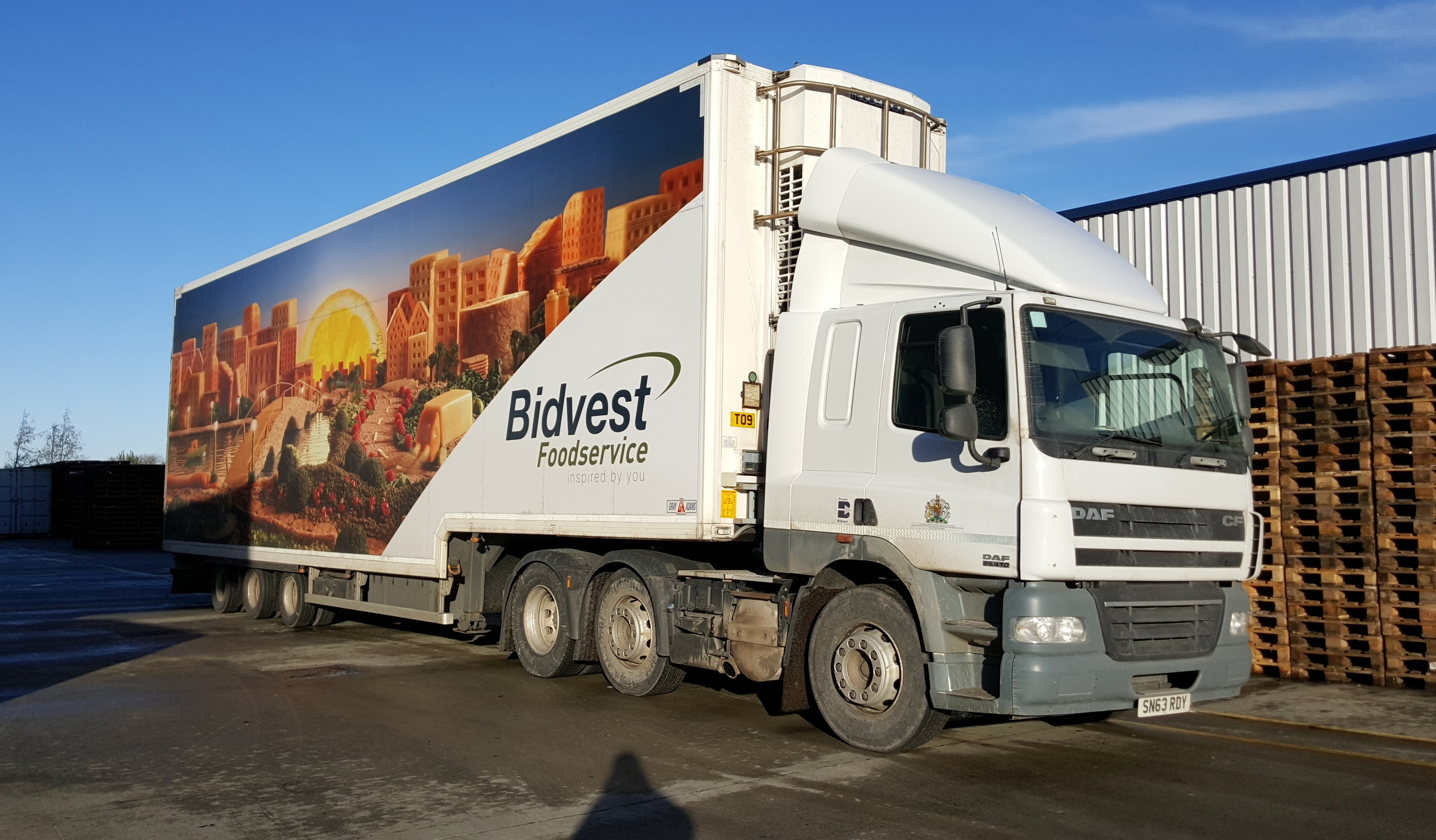
DAF CF in the 2015- Bidvest Foodservice livery

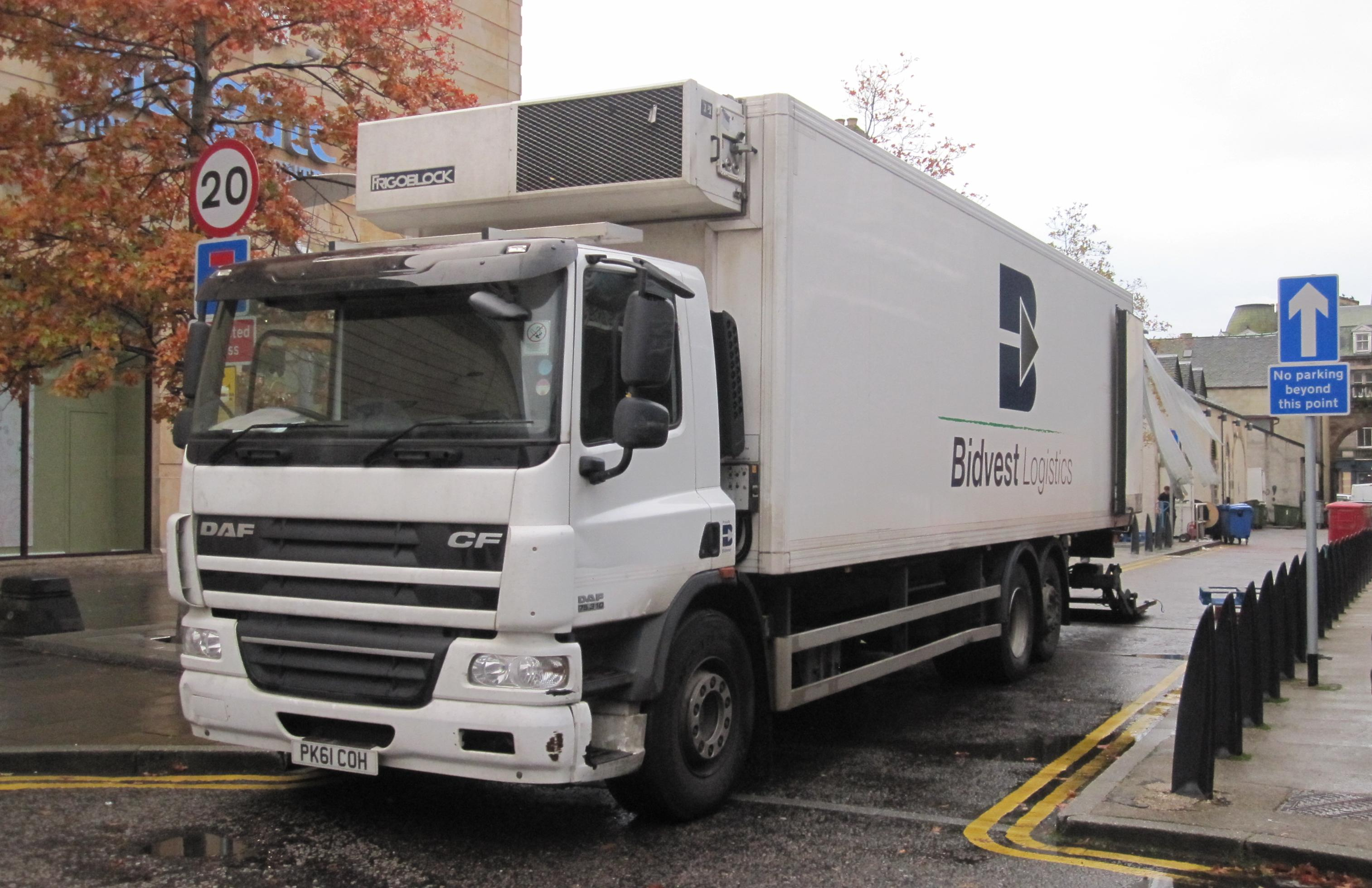
DAF CF in the Logistics livery
