= Band sergeant major =

Appointment in the British Army

Band sergeant major (BSM) is the appointment held by the senior playing musician in a British Army band, who holds the rank of warrant officer class 2 (except for the senior band sergeant major of the Guards Division, who is a warrant officer class 1).

The BSM also functions as the band's second senior non-commissioned officer (NCO) after the bandmaster and has various administrative duties. Formerly, in smaller regimental bands commanded by a bandmaster, the BSM was the senior NCO. Prospective BSMs attend a special three-week course at the Royal Military School of Music, one of which is run every year.

The equivalent appointment in the Household Cavalry is band corporal major. The band sergeant in Royal Air Force bands, although holding the lower rank of flight sergeant, has similar responsibilities. The WO2 in a Royal Marines band, like the WO1, holds the appointment of bandmaster.
