= Royal Army Pay Corps =

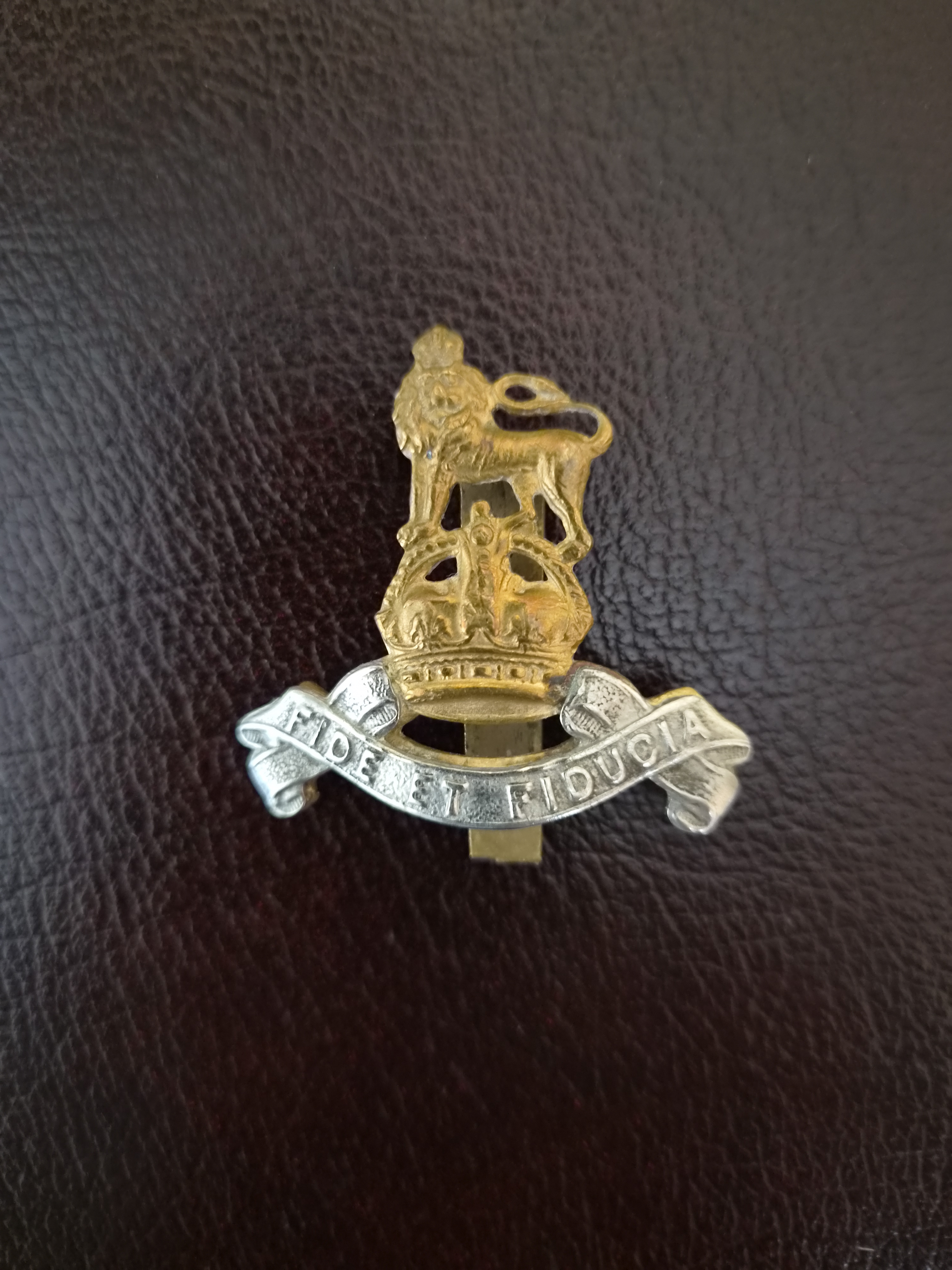
- Badge of the Royal Army Pay Corps
- Active: 1878–1992
- Allegiance: United Kingdom
- Branch: British Army
- Role: Pay for troops
- Garrison/HQ: Worthy Down, Hampshire
- Nicknames: The Inkslingers; The Quill Drivers
- Mottos: Fide et Fiducia (In faith and trust)
- March: Imperial Echoes
- Website: rapc-association.org.uk

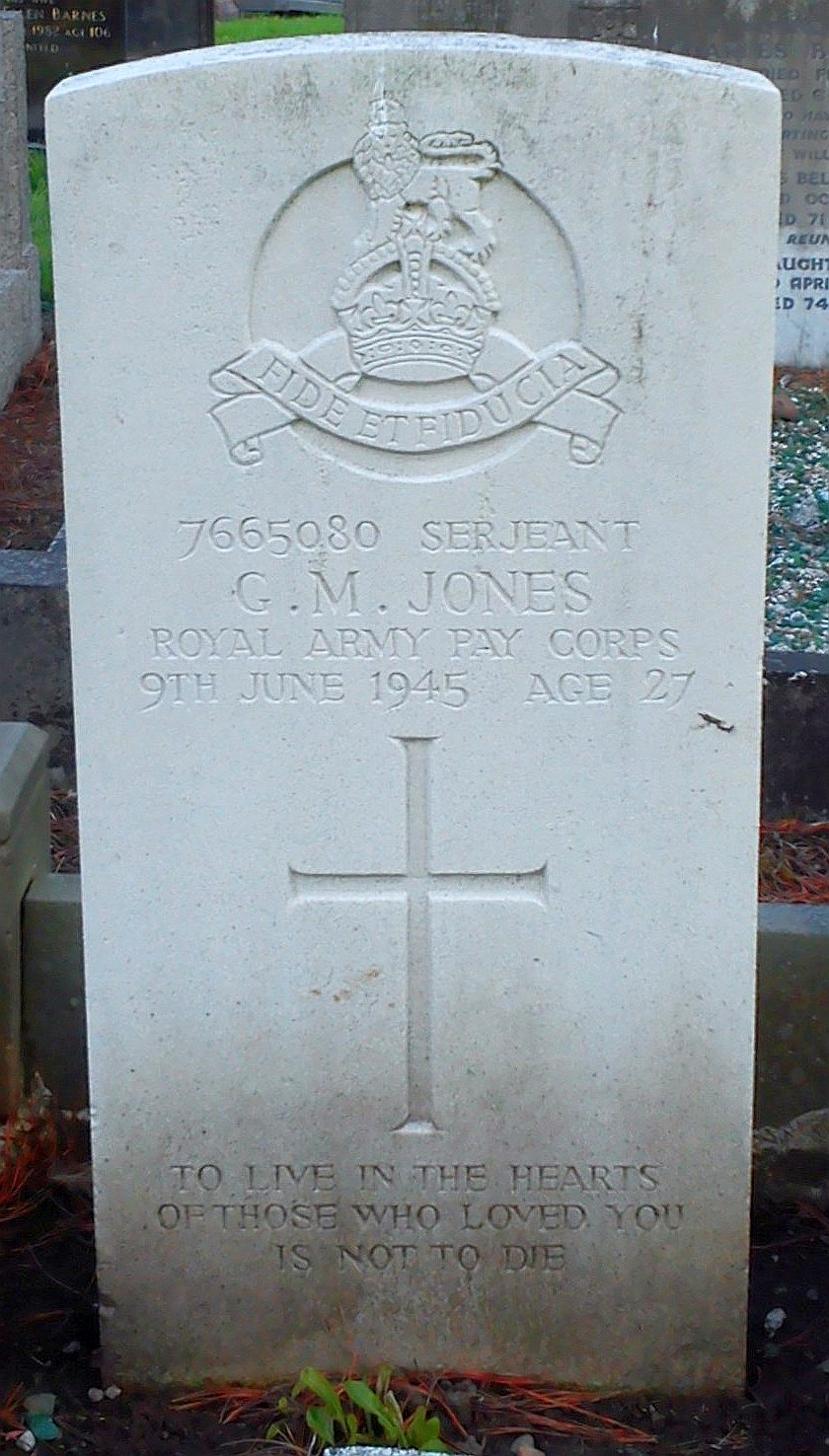
Bromsgrove cemetery, memorial for Sergeant GM Jones of the Royal Army Pay Corps

The Royal Army Pay Corps (RAPC) was the corps of the British Army responsible for administering all financial matters. It was amalgamated into the Adjutant General's Corps in 1992.

== History ==
The first "paymasters" existed in the army before the formation of the corps. Prior to the 19th century, each regiment had its own civilian paymaster and the first commissioned paymaster was introduced in 1792.

In 1870 a Pay Sub-Department of the Control Department was formed; an officer-only establishment, it gained autonomy as the Army Pay Department in 1878. In 1893 an Army Pay Corps was formed, composed of other ranks, to support the work of the Department. In 1920 the Army Pay Department and the Army Pay Corps were amalgamated to form the Royal Army Pay Corps (the prefix 'Royal' having been conferred in recognition of valuable services provided during the First World War).

In 1919 the financial responsibilities were split between the RAPC, which handled salaries, and the Corps of Military Accountants (CMA), which handled the army's finances. The CMA was disbanded in 1925 and its functions and some personnel were transferred to the RAPC.

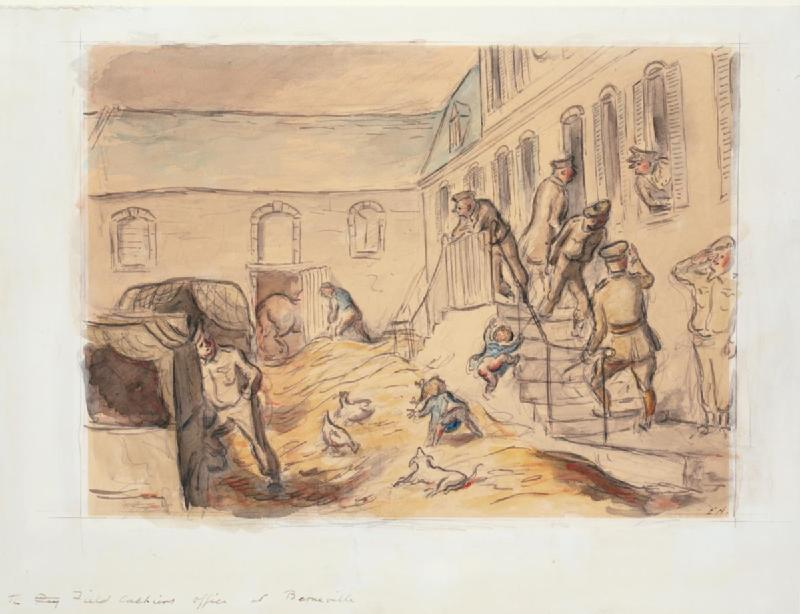
War art by Edward Ardizzone, showing the RAPC field cashier's office in Berneville, 1940

Before the Second World War, the RAPC did not accept recruits directly from civilian life, but only transfers from serving soldiers who had been in the Army for at least six months. During the Second World War, members of the Auxiliary Territorial Service and men of a "lower medical category" were often conscripted into the corps. Initially they received very little military training but after a discussion in Parliament were trained in armed combat, especially those posted closest to the frontlines, to prepare for surprise attacks on headquarters. The Pay Corps requisitioned Dalewood House in Mickleham near Dorking, Surrey, as its headquarters during the Second World War. The House is now the main building of Box Hill School, a Public School established in the village in 1959. Since the amalgamation into the Adjutant General's Corps in 1992 its functions have been carried out by the Staff and Personnel Support (SPS) Branch.

Headed by a Paymaster-in-Chief, the corps was responsible for keeping the army financially accountable to the servicemen and -women and Inland Revenue.

== Alliances ==
The corps had the following alliances:

- Canada – Royal Canadian Army Pay Corps
- South Africa – South African Administrative and Pay and Clerical Corps
- Hong Kong – Pay Section, Royal Hong Kong Defence Force
- Fiji – Fiji Army Pay Corps
