= Foreman of signals =

A foreman of signals is a highly qualified senior NCO or warrant officer signals engineering manager in the Royal Corps of Signals of the British Army and other Commonwealth armies. They undertake the role of equipment care specialist, with additional responsibilities for engineering and technical project management sometimes.

== Selection and training process ==
A soldier from the Royal Corps of Signals selected for foreman of signals training must hold a minimum qualification of class 1 communications systems engineer, have served a minimum of ten years within the Army and hold the rank of corporal or above. To be accepted onto the foreman of signals course, each individual candidate must follow a strict selection process that starts 15 months before the course start date. From May to December, the candidates must complete tutor marked assessments (TMAs) which are submitted monthly. In January, the candidates sit two three-hour exams, which are co-ordinated to start concurrently around the world. Successful candidates then attend a one-week selection board where different management and technical tasks are used to assess the candidates' suitability to the task of becoming a foreman of signals.

There are usually close to a hundred eligible candidates every year. However, the board only selects between 8 and 20 students for each course, which typically commences in the first week of September each year and lasts 20 months. During the course, they are given the rank of acting sergeant.

== Career progression ==
On completion of the course, the soldier is promoted to staff sergeant if the rank is not already held, and assumes the appointment of foreman of signals. They work as part of a unit operations team with a yeoman of signals, who is a communications technical specialist. The holder of the appointment can be promoted through the ranks from staff sergeant, to warrant officer class 2, then warrant officer class 1. To distinguish the appointment, the suffix of FofS is used (i.e. SSgt(FofS), WO2(FofS), WO1(FofS)).

== History ==
The title has definitely existed since the formation of the Royal Corps of Signals and may have been used previously in the Royal Engineers Signal Service. Formerly, staff sergeants and warrant officers class 2 held the appointment of foreman of signals quartermaster sergeant (FoSQMS) and warrant officers class 1 held the appointment of foreman of signals sergeant major (FoSSM).

The first foreman of signals course was held in 1951 and the current courses (as of March 2017) are the 86th and 87th running of the course.

== India ==
In the Indian Army Corps of Signals, a foreman of signals holds junior commissioned officer rank and must have had a minimum of ten years' service. Training courses are conducted at the Military College of Telecommunication Engineering at Mhow.
