= Yeoman of signals =

Commonwealth navy appointment

A yeoman of signals is a signals petty officer in the British Royal Navy and other Commonwealth navies. The term has been in use since 1816. The designation is also used for a communications technical specialist (as opposed to a foreman of signals, who is a signals engineering specialist, or an NCO or WO serving on "regimental duty" in the chain of command) with the rank of staff sergeant or warrant officer in the Royal Corps of Signals of the British Army.

The Royal Corps of Signals will introduce the appointment of yeoman of signals (electronic warfare) as the British Army focuses on cyber warfare.
