= Corps of Military Accountants =

Corps of the British Army, 1919–1925

The Corps of Military Accountants was a short-lived corps of the British Army. It was formed in November 1919 and disbanded in July 1925. Its members handled financial matters, although matters relating to pay continued to be handled by the Royal Army Pay Corps.

All personnel serving as Military Accountant Officers and Military Accountant Clerks transferred to the new corps. On the disbandment of the corps most of its personnel who chose to stay in the Army either reverted to their previous regiments and corps or transferred to the RAPC.

== Appointments ==
Officers, who held a minimum rank of Captain and were mostly qualified accountants, held appointments depending on rank, although they continued to use their normal ranks in day-to-day military life.

- Colonel = Accountant Officer 1st Class
- Lieutenant-Colonel = Accountant Officer 2nd Class
- Major = Accountant Officer 3rd Class
- Captain = Accountant Officer 4th, 5th or 6th Class

Warrant Officers and Other Ranks held appointments as follows:

- Warrant Officer Class I = Accountant Sergeant Major
- Warrant Officer Class II = Accountant Quartermaster Sergeant
- Staff Sergeant = Accountant Staff Sergeant
- Sergeant = Accountant Sergeant
- Corporal = Writer Corporal
- Lance-Corporal = Writer Lance-Corporal
- Private = Writer Private
