= Foreman of signals (information systems) =

Appointment in the British Army

Within the British Army, Royal Corps of Signals, a soldier selected for Foreman of Signals training must be a SNCO Class 1 Communications Systems Engineer. They will normally hold a foundation degree Military Information Systems. On completion of the course, the soldier is promoted to Staff Sergeant (Colour Sergeant for Royal Marines) if the rank is not already held, and assumes the appointment of Foreman of Signals (Information Systems) and be awarded a BSc(Hons) in Management Information Systems. The holder of the appointment can be promoted through the ranks in line with current military policy from Staff Sergeant, to Warrant Officer Class 2, then Warrant Officer Class 1. To distinguish the appointment, a suffix of (FofS IS) is used (i.e. SSgt(FofS IS) WO2(FofS IS), WO1(FofS IS)).

== History ==
The trade was originally ADP Specialist and only open to serving soldiers at the rank of Sgt. This trade dates back into the 80's

The Supervisor started around 2002.

The title Foreman of Signals (Information Systems) (FofS (IS)) was granted to the supervisory trade formally known as Supervisor (IS) in 2007. The first Supervisor (IS) title holders completed a nine-week information systems course. After 3 courses this was extended to an 8-month course with the latest variation now approximately 12 months in length. Academically the course has evolved from a Foundation Degree accredited by Bournemouth University. As of August 2011

There are also approximately 1-2 Royal Marines from the Royal Marines Information Systems (RMIS) specialisation that also attend the Royal Signals course. They have been attending the course from around 2000

== Selection process ==
Candidates are filtered from the personnel centre in Glasgow. Upon meeting the basic requirements candidates are sent a joint distance learning pack that will allow a selection panel to decide if a candidate should become a FofS (IS) or a FofS. Upon completion of a one-year DLP and final examination successful candidates are invited to attend a one-week selection board, as per all other supervisory trades, where successful candidates are filtered to attend a Foreman of Signals (Information Systems) Course.
