= Orderly room sergeant =

Appointment in the British Army

The orderly room sergeant (ORS), orderly room colour sergeant (ORCS) or orderly room quartermaster sergeant (ORQMS) is the chief clerk of an infantry battalion in the British Army, assisting the adjutant. The appointment of ORS or ORCS is held if the chief clerk holds the rank of colour sergeant and the appointment of ORQMS is held if they hold the rank of warrant officer class 2.

Orderly room (colour) sergeant is the most senior colour sergeant appointment in a battalion. ORQMS is the third most senior WO2 appointment in a battalion after the regimental quartermaster sergeant and the technical quartermaster sergeant.
