= Quartermaster sergeant instructor =

Commonwealth military appointment

Quartermaster sergeant instructor (QMSI) is a warrant officer appointment in the armies of the United Kingdom and Canada.

== British Army ==
Quartermaster sergeant instructor is an appointment held by warrant officers class 2 in the British Army's Small Arms School Corps and by some in the Royal Engineers and Royal Army Physical Training Corps.

== Canada ==
In the Canadian Army, QMSI is an appointment held by the senior master warrant officer, within each battalion of the Princess Patricia's Canadian Light Infantry.
