= Regimental quartermaster sergeant =

Military rank or appointment

Regimental quartermaster sergeant (RQMS) is a military rank in some militaries, and an appointment in others.

== Irish Defence Forces ==
BQMS insignia (Irish Army)

Battalion quartermaster sergeant (BQMS, ceathrúsháirsint cathláin in Irish) is a rank in the Irish Army and Irish Air Corps equivalent to warrant officer class 2 (NATO OR-8) in the British Army. The equivalent in the Artillery Corps and Army Ranger Wing is regimental quartermaster sergeant (RQMS).

== Singapore ==
Like the UK example, the regimental quartermaster sergeant is an appointment in a battalion-sized unit usually held by a second warrant officer. They are the senior assistant to the quartermaster, who may be a more senior warrant officer for non-combat units.

== United Kingdom ==
Insignia of a British Army WO2 regimental quartermaster sergeant

Regimental quartermaster sergeant is an appointment held by a warrant officer class 2 in the British Army and Royal Marines. The RQMS is the senior assistant to the quartermaster of a regiment or battalion and also usually functions as the deputy regimental sergeant major. Some units have more than one. RQMS was a separate rank until 1915, when it became a warrant officer appointment with the creation of the rank of warrant officer class II.

In the Household Cavalry, the appointment is instead regimental quartermaster corporal.

== United States ==
Regimental quartermaster sergeant as well as battalion quartermaster sergeant were ranks in the U.S. Army during World War I. They were re-designated regimental and battalion supply sergeants on 3 June 1916.
