= Garrison sergeant major =

Appointment in the British Army

A garrison sergeant major (GSM) in the British Army is the senior warrant officer of a garrison and holds the rank of warrant officer class 1. The Garrison Sergeant Major London District (GSM LONDIST), always a warrant officer from the Foot Guards, holds one of the four most senior WO1 appointments in the British Army and has military ceremonial responsibility for important state occasions such as Trooping the Colour.

== London District ==
Garrison Sergeant Major, London District
- GSM London District badge in full dress (left) and service dress (right)
- Country: United Kingdom
- Service branch: British Army
- Abbreviation: GSM LONDIST
- Rank group: Warrant officer class 1
- NATO rank code: OR-9
- Formation: 1940

The post of GSM London District was established in the early 1940s with specific responsibilities as state ceremonial sergeant major. The first tasks of the new GSM were to organise the military ceremonial at the funeral of King George VI in 1952 and the coronation of Queen Elizabeth II in 1953. The GSM also organised the military ceremonial at the state funeral of Elizabeth II on 19 September 2022.

List of GSMs London District
Name	Appointed	Regiment	Ref.
Thomas Courtney	1940	Coldstream Guards	
George Howe	1950	Irish Guards	
Frederick Thomas Aylen	1951	Coldstream Guards	
George Stone MVO, MBE	1952	Irish Guards	
Tom Taylor MVO, MBE	1965	Grenadier Guards	
Alex Dumon MVO, MBE	1977	Coldstream Guards	
Alan G 'Perry' Mason MVO, MBE	1987	Coldstream Guards	
Bill Mott OBE, MVO	2002	Welsh Guards	
Vern Stokes OBE, MVO, DL	2015	Coldstream Guards	

The GSM London District traditionally wore the same badge of rank as a regimental sergeant major of Foot Guards, the large Royal Coat of Arms on the right upper sleeve. However, on 28 April 2011, the day before the wedding of The Duke and Duchess of Cambridge, the Ministry of Defence announced that, in recognition of the work done by garrison sergeant majors on behalf of the Royal Household, Queen Elizabeth II approved the revival of the original insignia worn by sergeant majors appointed to the court of King William IV in the early 19th century. It incorporates the large Royal Coat of Arms worn by selected warrant officers class 1 of the Household Division, placed over four chevrons sewn in gold thread, the traditional badge of the sergeant major, originally worn on both arms of their tunics.

== Other garrisons ==
Garrison sergeant major
- GSM badge in service dress
- Country: United Kingdom
- Service branch: British Army
- Abbreviation: GSM
- Rank group: Warrant officer class 1
- NATO rank code: OR-9

List of other British Army garrisons and installations which have a garrison sergeant major as of 2018
Unit	Location
29 (Explosive Ordnance Disposal and Search) Group Support Unit	Saffron Walden
Attack Helicopter Force Headquarters	Ipswich
Andover Support Unit	Andover
Defence School of Communications and Information Systems Blandford Garrison Support Unit	Blandford
Dhekelia Station	Dhekelia
Episkopi Station	Episkopi
European Support Group European Joint Support Unit Supreme Headquarters Allied Powers Europe	Casteau
Headquarters 15 North East Brigade Headquarters York Garrison	York
Headquarters 2 (South East) Brigade	Folkestone
Headquarters Aldershot Garrison	Aldershot
Headquarters Bicester Garrison & Bicester Garrison Support Unit	Bicester
Headquarters Catterick Garrison	Catterick
Headquarters Colchester Garrison	Colchester
Headquarters Edinburgh Garrison	Edinburgh
Headquarters Land Warfare Centre	Warminster
Headquarters Tidworth and Bulford Garrison	Bulford
Joint Support Unit Corsham	Corsham
Northern Ireland Garrison Support Unit	Lisburn
The Armour Centre Establishment Support Group	Wareham

== Gallery ==
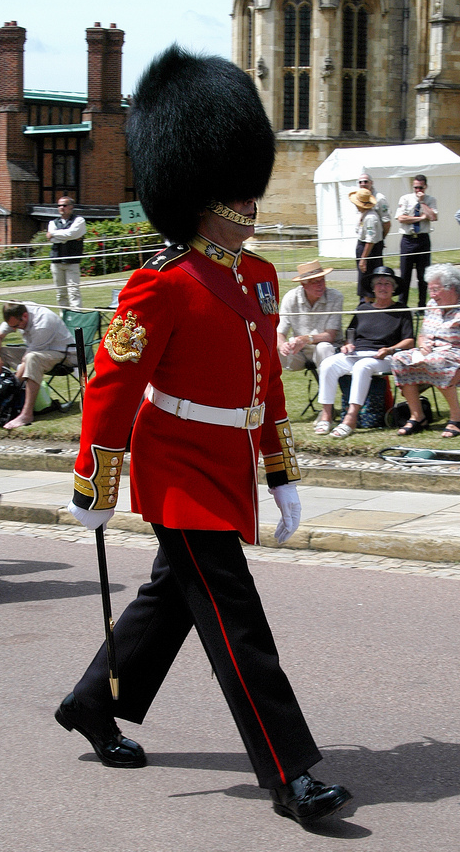
GSM London District Bill Mott wearing the pre-2011 insignia

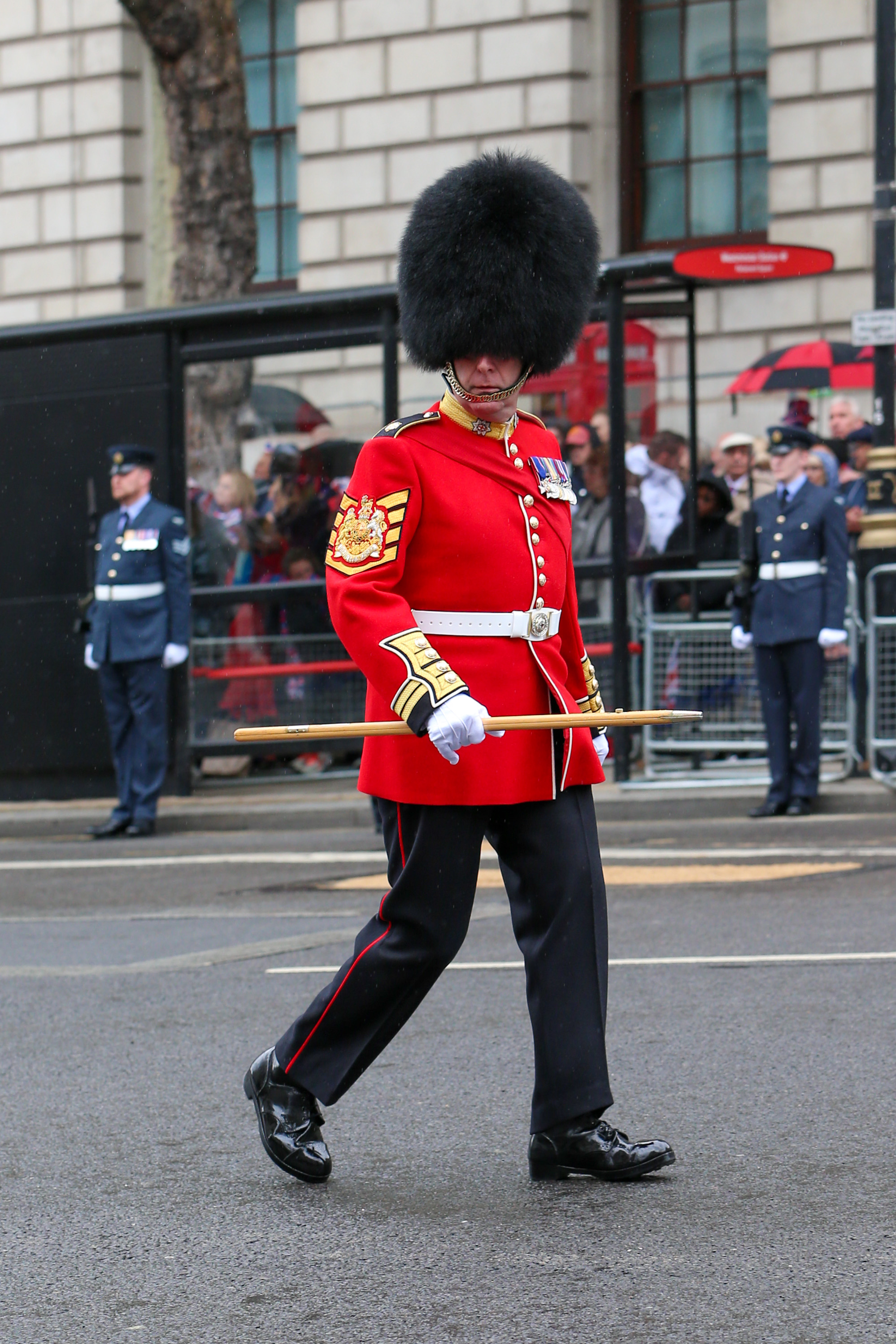
GSM London District Vern Stokes wearing the post-2011 insignia

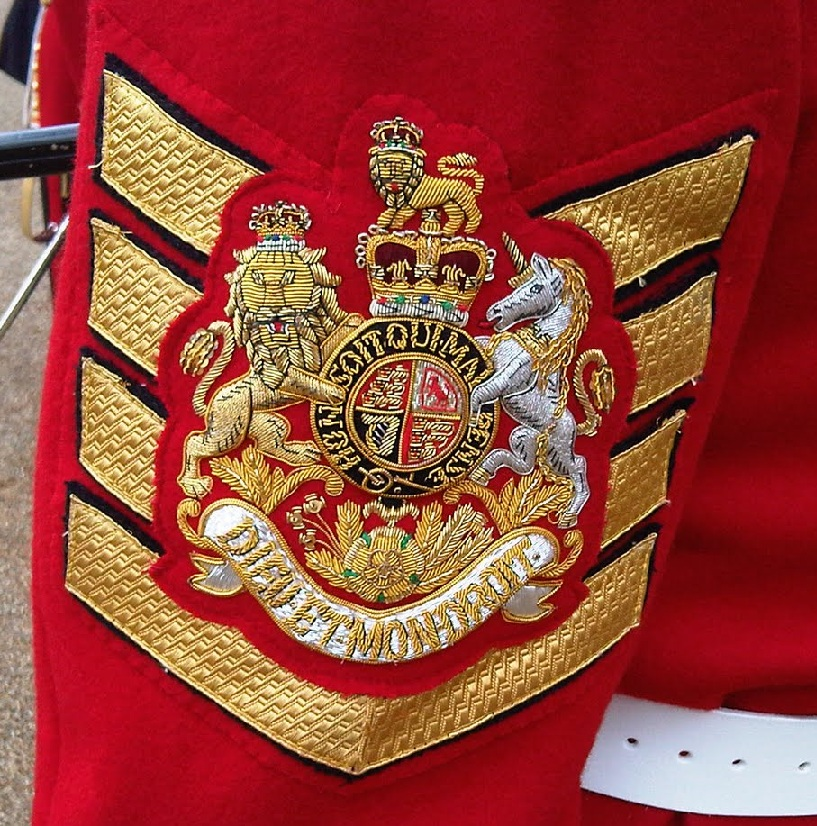
GSM London District badge in full dress
