= Brigade major =

Commonwealth military appointment

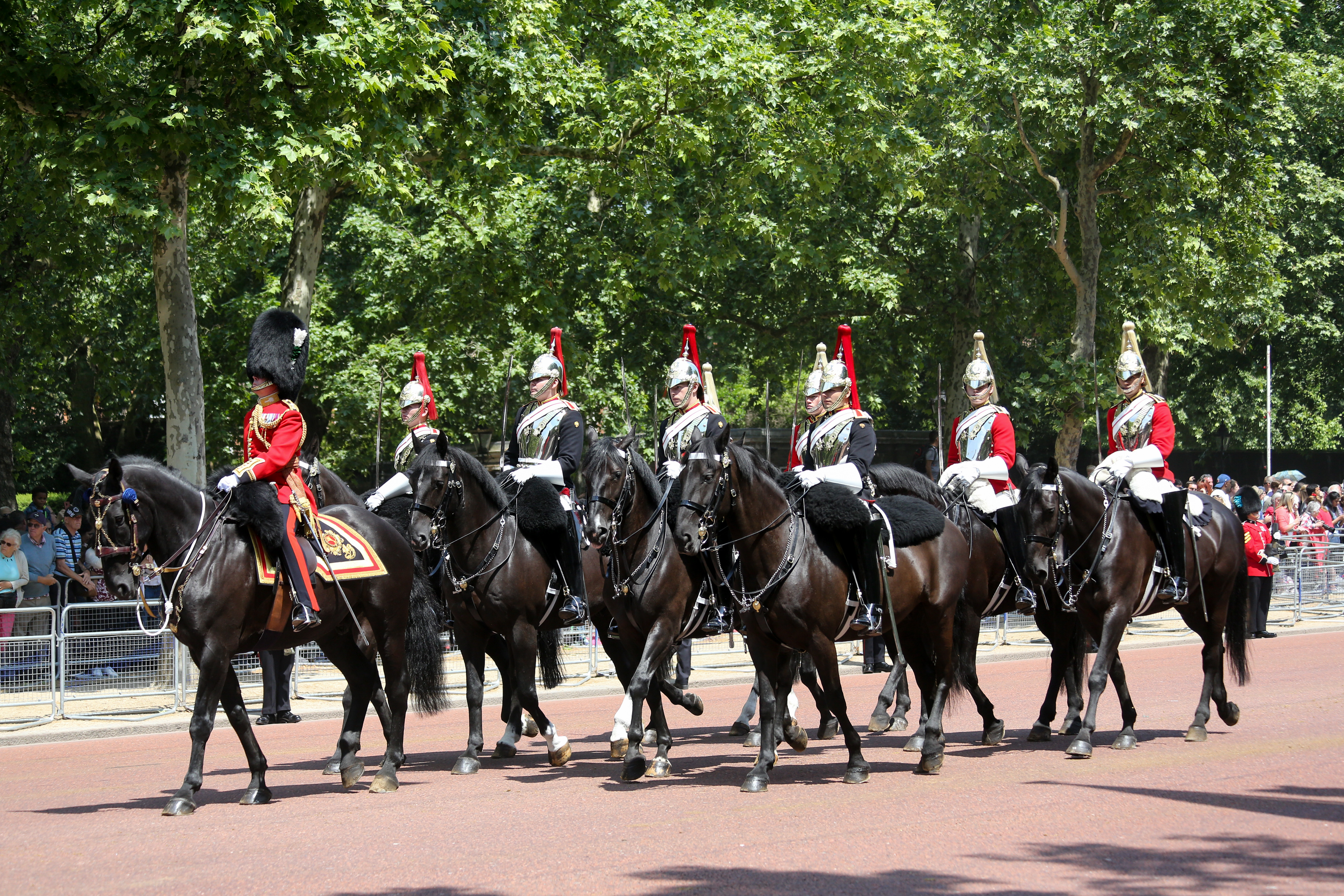
The brigade major of the Household Division (first from left), 2018

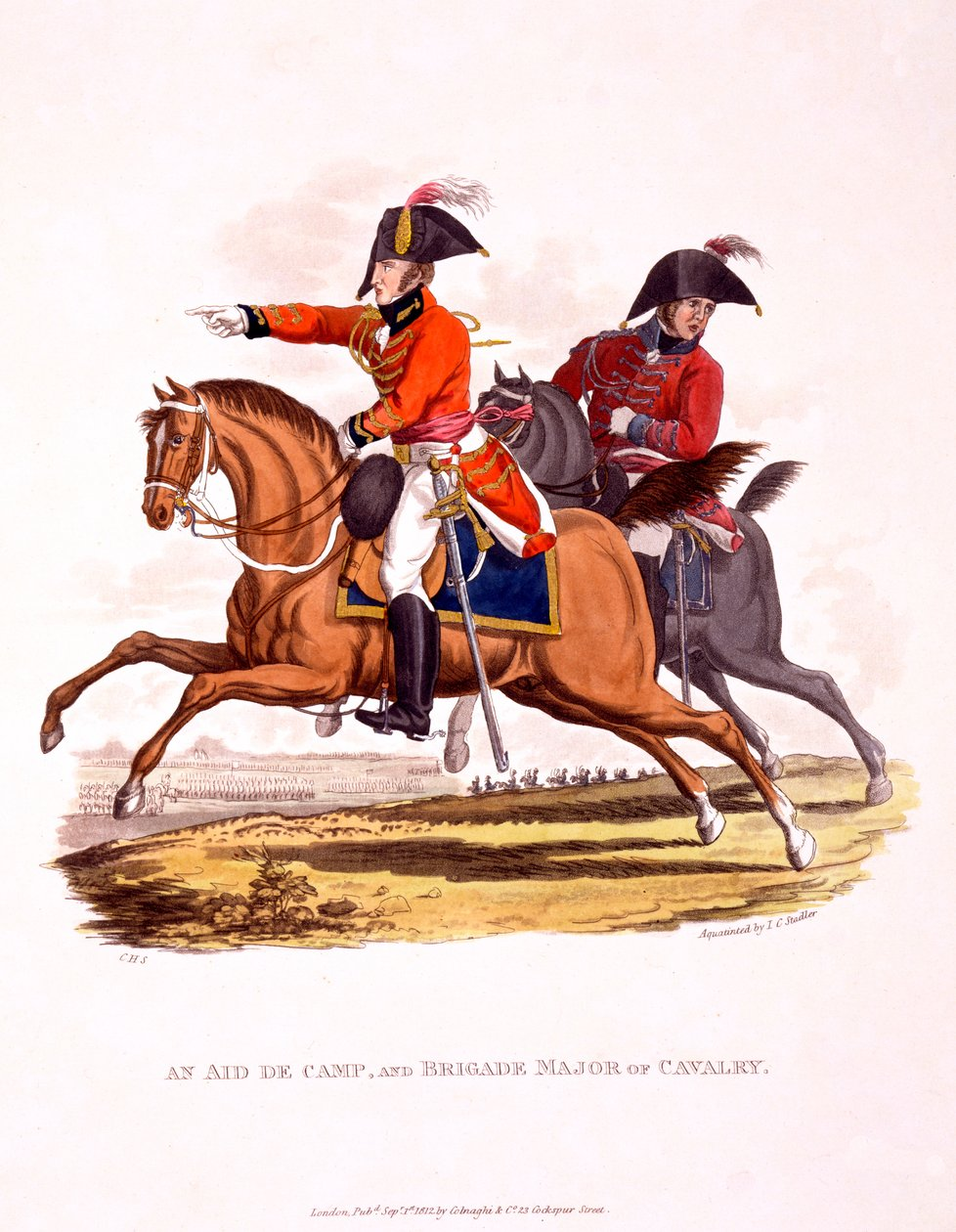
1812 engraving of a brigade major (right)

A brigade major was the chief of staff of a brigade in the British Army. They most commonly held the rank of major, although the appointment was also held by captains, and was head of the brigade's "G - Operations and Intelligence" section directly, and oversaw the two other branches, "A – Administration" and "Q – Quartermaster". Intentionally ranked lower than the lieutenant colonels commanding the brigade's combat battalions, his role was to expand on, detail and execute the intentions of the commanding brigadier.

== History ==
In 1913, staff captains of artillery in the British Army were re-styled as brigade majors to bring them into line with cavalry and infantry practice. In the 21st century, the title is no longer used except in the Household Division and in divisional-level artillery headquarters. As of 2014 the title is still retained by HQ London District.

During World War I, the brigade major was reportedly "a key personality who affected the health and happiness of the battalions." He was in most frequent contact with the front-line troops and was responsible for planning brigade operations. Many brigade majors held the rank of captain, e.g., the future prime minister, Anthony Eden, was a brigade major at the age of twenty-one.

The practice of using brigade majors has continued in some Commonwealth armies, such as that of India. The position was a standard fixture in the British Army and Canadian Army until between 1982 and 1984 when the NATO system was adopted and brigade G-3 (Operations), also known as "Chief of Staff", replaced the brigade major. In the old system, the brigade major was a Staff Officer 2 in charge of "G Branch", abbreviated "GSO2", General Staff Officer (Grade 2). The rank of brigade major was used in the United States Army until the War of 1812, with army regulations mentioning only brigade majors as necessary/required staff for a brigadier general.

== See also ==
- Staff (military)
