= 245th Battalion (Canadian Grenadier Guards), CEF =

The 245th (Canadian Grenadier Guards) Battalion, CEF was a unit in the Canadian Expeditionary Force during the First World War. Based in Montreal, Quebec, the unit began recruiting in the spring of 1916 in that city. After sailing to England in May 1917, the battalion was absorbed into the 23rd Reserve Battalion, CEF upon arrival. The 245th (Canadian Grenadier Guards) Battalion, CEF had one Officer Commanding: Lieut-Col. C. C. Ballantyne.

The battalion is perpetuated by The Canadian Grenadier Guards.

== Bibliography ==
- Meek, John F. Over the Top! The Canadian Infantry in the First World War. Orangeville, Ont.: The Author, 1971.
