= Canadian Grenadier Guards =

The Canadian Grenadier Guards
- Badge of the regiment
- Active: 1859–present
- Country: Province of Canada (1859–1867); Canada (1867–present)
- Branch: Canadian Army
- Type: Foot guards
- Role: Light infantry; Guard of Honour; Public duties
- Size: Battalion
- Part of: 34 Canadian Brigade Group
- Garrison/HQ: CFB Montreal (Canadian Grenadier Guards Armoury 171 avenue Esplanade)
- Nicknames: "The Guards"; "Grenadiers"; "CGG"
- Motto: Nulli secundus (Latin for 'second to none')
- March: Quick: "The British Grenadiers"; Slow: "Scipio"
- Anniversaries: Regimental birthday: 12 March (1764 onward)
- Engagements: Fenian Raids; Second Boer War; First World War; Second World War; War in Afghanistan
- Battle honours: See list
- Website: www.canada.ca/en/army/corporate/2-canadian-division/the-canadian-grenadier-guards.html

Commanders
- Commanding officer: LCol Vincent Gagnon, AdeC, CD
- Regimental Sergeant-Major: CWO Jesse Carlevaris, CD
- Colonel of the Regiment: Louise Arbour, Governor General of Canada
- Colonel-in-Chief: King Charles III

Insignia
- Plume: White (left side of bearskin cap)
- Headdress: Khaki beret
- Abbreviation: CGG

"The British Grenadiers"
"The British Grenadiers", performed here by the United States Army Band Strings ensemble, is the authorized march of several Commonwealth of Nations regiments.

The Canadian Grenadier Guards (CGG) is a reserve infantry regiment in the 34 Canadian Brigade Group, 2nd Canadian Division, of the Canadian Army. The regiment is the oldest and second-most-senior infantry regiment in the Primary Reserve of the Canadian Army. Located in Montreal, its main role is the provision of combat-ready light infantry troops in support of Canadian regular infantry. It is a Household Foot Guard regiment and also provides soldiers for public ceremonial duties (Ceremonial Guard), performing similar ceremonial duties as the Guards regiments of the British Army. This primarily entails mounting the guard at Government House (Rideau Hall), the king's and governor general's residence, and performing the "Changing the Guard" ceremony on Parliament Hill in Ottawa, a task it shares with Canada's senior Household Foot Guard regiment, the Governor General's Foot Guards of Ottawa. The Canadian Grenadier Guards is an allied regiment to the British Grenadier Guards.

== Lineage ==
The regimental colour of the Canadian Grenadier Guards.

The camp flag of the Canadian Grenadier Guards.

=== The Canadian Grenadier Guards ===
The Canadian Grenadier Guards originated in Montreal on 17 November 1859 as the First Battalion Volunteer Militia Rifles of Canada. It was redesignated as The First (or Prince of Wales's) Regiment of Volunteer Rifles of Canadian Militia on 7 September 1860. On 2 May 1898 it amalgamated with the 6th Battalion "Fusiliers" and was redesignated the 1st Battalion "Prince of Wales' Regiment Fusiliers". It was redesignated as the 1st Regiment "Prince of Wales' Fusiliers" on 8 May 1900; as the 1st Regiment Canadian Grenadier Guards on 29 December 1911; as The Canadian Grenadier Guards on 29 March 1920; as the 2nd (Reserve) Battalion, The Canadian Grenadier Guards on 7 November 1941; as The Canadian Grenadier Guards on 15 February 1946; as The Canadian Grenadier Guards (6th Battalion, The Canadian Guards) on 1 September 1954 before reverting to The Canadian Grenadier Guards on 1 August 1976.

=== 6th Battalion "Fusiliers" ===
The 6th Battalion "Fusiliers" originated in Montreal on 31 January 1862 as the 6th Battalion Volunteer Militia Rifles, Canada. It was redesignated as the Sixth Battalion Volunteer Militia, Canada, or "Hochelaga Light Infantry" on 5 June 1863; as the 6th Battalion "Hochelaga Fusiliers" on 3 December 1875; and finally as the 6th Battalion "Fusiliers" on 28 January 1876. On 2 May 1898, it amalgamated with The First (or Prince of Wales's) Regiment of Volunteer Rifles of Canadian Militia.

=== Lineage chart ===
Lineage chart

1812	1st Militia Light Infy Bn
1815	Disbanded
1855
1859
1860
1862
1863
1866
1870
1875
1876
1898
1900
1911
1915
1916
1917
1920
1936
1940
1940
1941
1942
1945
1945
1945
1946
1954
1976
2012

2nd Bn, Select Embodied Militia
Disbanded
The Canadian Grenadier Guards, CASF
1st Bn, The Canadian Grenadier Guards, CASF
22nd Armd Regt (The Canadian Grenadier Guards), CAC, CASF
22nd Armd Regt (The Canadian Grenadier Guards), RCAC, CASF
Disbanded

Corps of Canadian Voyageurs
Disbanded
Independent rifle coys
First Bn Volunteer Militia Rifles of Canada
The First (or Prince of Wales's) Regt of Volunteer Rifles of Canadian Militia
Active service (Note: March)
Active service (Note: May)
87th "Overseas" Bn, CEF
Disbanded
22nd Canadian Tank Bn (The Canadian Grenadier Guards), CAC, CASF
22nd Canadian Tank Bn (The Canadian Grenadier Guards), RCAC, CASF
Disbanded

Montreal Incorporated Volunteers
Disbanded
1st Bn "Prince of Wales' Regt Fusiliers"
1st Regt "Prince of Wales' Fusiliers"
1st Regt Canadian Grenadier Guards
1st Bn (87th Bn, CEF), The Canadian Grenadier Guards
The Canadian Grenadier Guards
2nd (Reserve) Bn, The Canadian Grenadier Guards
The Canadian Grenadier Guards
The Canadian Grenadier Guards (6th Bn, The Canadian Guards)
The Canadian Grenadier Guards
Perpetuates War of 1812 units

Montreal Militia Bn
Disbanded
6th Bn Volunteer Militia Rifles, Canada
Sixth Bn Volunteer Militia, Canada, or "Hochelaga Light Infy"
Active service (Note: March–June)
Active service
6th Bn "Hochelaga Fusiliers"
6th Bn "Fusiliers"
245th "Overseas" Bn, CEF
Absorbed by 23rd Reserve Bn
2nd Bn (245th Bn, CEF), (Note: Reserve) The Canadian Grenadier Guards
Disbanded

Provincial Commissariat Voyageurs
Disbanded

1st Bn (City of Montreal) “British Militia”
Disbanded

== Perpetuations ==
=== The War of 1812 ===
- 1st Militia Light Infantry Battalion
- 2nd Battalion, Select Embodied Militia
- Corps of Canadian Voyageurs
- Montreal Incorporated Volunteers
- Montreal Militia Battalion
- Provincial Commissariat Voyageurs
- 1st Battalion (City of Montreal) "British Militia"

=== The Great War ===
- 87th Battalion (Canadian Grenadier Guards), CEF
- 245th Battalion (Canadian Grenadier Guards), CEF

=== World War Two ===
- 22nd Armoured Regiment (The Canadian Grenadier Guards), CAC, CASF

== Operational history ==
=== The Fenian Raids ===
The First (or Prince of Wales's) Regiment of Volunteer Rifles of Canadian Militia was called out on active service on 8 March 1866 and served on the South-eastern frontier until it was removed from active service on 31 March 1866.

The Sixth Battalion Volunteer Militia, Canada was called out on active service from 8 to 31 March and from 1 to 22 June 1866 and served on the South-eastern frontier.

The First (or Prince of Wales's) Regiment of Volunteer Rifles of Canadian Militia was called out on active service on 24 May 1870 and served on the South-eastern frontier until it was removed from active service on 31 May 1870.

The Sixth Battalion Volunteer Militia, Canada was called out on active service on 24 May 1870 and served on the South-eastern frontier until it was removed from active service on 31 May 1870.

The regiment contributed volunteers for the Canadian Contingents during the Second Boer War (1899–1902).

=== The Second Boer War (11 October 1899 – 31 May 1902) ===
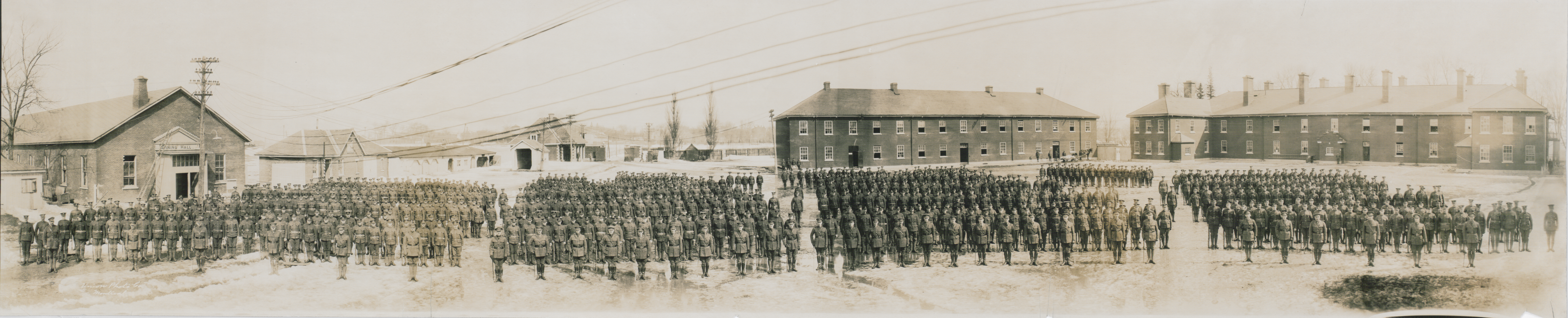

At total of 23 members of 1st Prince of Wales Fusiliers (1st P.W.R.F.) participated and served during the Second Boer War, most (16) being attached to 'E' Company of The Royal Canadian Regiment of Infantry, 2nd (Special Service) Battalion. Several Officers (3) relinquished their commissions to join Canadian Mounted units with The Royal Canadian Dragoons, Lord Strathcona's Horse, and The Canadian Scouts. A further 4 Officers joined British or South African Mounted units.

On 12 February 1900, the Royal Canadian Regiment of Infantry, 2nd (Special Service) Battalion joined the 19th Brigade to march and fight in the great British offensive aimed at capturing Pretoria, the capital of the Transvaal. The battalion was soon in action at Paardeberg Drift, suffering heavy casualties on 18 February, and mounting the famous attack that led to the surrender of General Cronje's Boer forces on the 27th. Paardeberg was the first major British victory of the war.

After the Battle of Paardeberg the 2nd Battalion RCRI fought in the British advance on the Boer capitals of Bloemfontein and Pretoria, gaining in experience and reputation all the while. By the time they marched past Lord Roberts in Pretoria on 5 June 1900, it was considered by many observers as good as any battalion in the British Army. With the Transvaal capital in British hands, and the war seemingly won, the 2nd Battalion took up lines-of-communications duties and the unit spent the rest of its tour of operations on this assignment, except for an interlude spent with a column of infantry chasing mounted Boer forces.

=== The Great War ===
Details of the regiment were placed on active service on 6 August 1914 for local protection duties. Following conventional army practice the whole regiment was not sent. Some 350 men were drafted to join the 14th Battalion Canadian Expeditionary Force (CEF). While other contingents were also recruited for France and Flanders: the 87th Battalion (Canadian Grenadier Guards), CEF was authorised on 22 December 1915 and embarked for Britain on 23 April 1916. It disembarked in France on 12 August 1916, where it fought as part of the 11th Infantry Brigade, 4th Canadian Division in France and Flanders until the end of the war. The battalion was subsequently disbanded on 30 August 1920. The system of temporary battalion formations was quite disruptive for the regulars of the permanent regimental establishment.

The 245th Battalion (Canadian Grenadier Guards), CEF was authorised on 15 July 1916 and embarked for Britain on 3 May 1917 where it was absorbed by the 23rd Reserve Battalion, CEF on 14 May 1917 to provide reinforcements to the Canadian Corps in the field. The battalion was subsequently disbanded on 17 July 1917.

=== The Second World War ===
The recruitment drive in 1939 was entirely different from that deployed during the Great War. The regiment mobilised The Canadian Grenadier Guards, CASF on 24 May 1940. It was re-designated as the 1st Battalion, The Canadian Grenadier Guards, CASF on 7 November 1940. It was converted to armour and re-designated as the 22nd Armoured Regiment (The Canadian Grenadier Guards), CAC, CASF on 26 January 1942. It embarked for Britain on 25 September 1942. Less than two years later, in June 1944, it sailed with the D-Day landings. On 26 July 1944, it landed in France as part of the 4th Armoured Brigade, 4th Canadian Armoured Division, and continued to fight in North West Europe until the end of the war. The regimental casualties were 97 killed, and 230 wounded. It was reconfigured as the 22nd Armoured Regiment (The Canadian Grenadier Guards), RCAC, CASF on 2 August 1945. The overseas regiment was disbanded on 15 February 1946. Their uniform was similar to that of the British Grenadiers except for the regimental buttons and a red and white hackle.

On 1 June 1945, a second Active Force component of the regiment was mobilised for service in the Pacific theatre of operations as the 22nd Canadian Tank Battalion (The Canadian Grenadier Guards), CAC, CASF. It was re-designated the 22nd Canadian Tank Battalion (The Canadian Grenadier Guards), RCAC, CASF and was disbanded on 1 November 1945.

=== War in Afghanistan ===
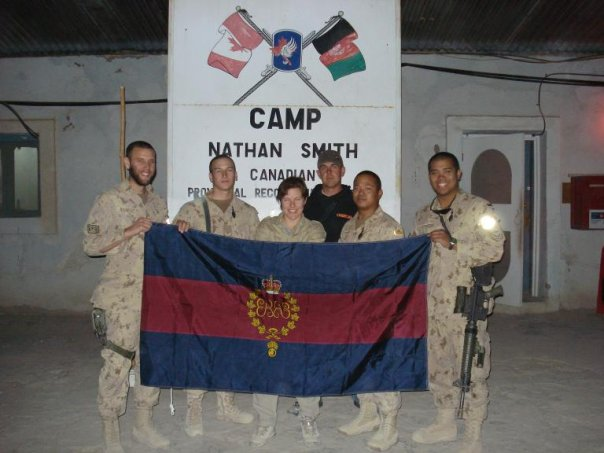

The regiment contributed a large number of volunteers for the Canadian task forces contingents during the War in Afghanistan.

== History ==
=== Predecessor and perpetuated units ===
The history of the Canadian Grenadier Guards parallels in many ways the evolution of Canada as a nation, beginning in the early days after the Treaty of Paris in 1763.

On 12 March 1764, Colonel Frederick Haldimand ordered, from Trois-Rivières, the formation of a volunteer unit to aid in the defence of Canada. In response, the 1st Company, District of Montreal Militia was raised, under the command of Captain de Montizambert; the company was drawn from the traditional militia of the Ancien régime, and was predominantly French-speaking. This company was raised in status to a battalion in 1807, becoming the 1st Battalion, Montreal Militia under the command of Lieutenant-Colonel James McGill, founder of McGill University. Elements of the 1st Battalion fought at the Battle of Châteauguay (26 October 1813) under the command of Lieutenant-Colonel Charles de Salaberry; as a result of their conduct, the 1st Battalion was awarded a pair of Colours after recommendation by the Commander-in-Chief, Sir George Prevost, to the Prince Regent.

The Select Embodied Militia continued to exist after the War of 1812, being called upon next during the Rebellions of 1837–1838. Various units existed as Montreal Rifles, Loyal Montreal Volunteers and later Montreal Volunteer Rifles. With the passage of the Militia Act in 1859, the Montreal Rifles (and other independent companies) became the First Battalion, Volunteer Militia Rifles of Canada on 17 November 1859, the first "Volunteer Militia" battalion to be formed in the British Empire. In 1860, the unit was raised to regimental status by The Prince of Wales with the title of First or "Prince of Wales" Regiment, Volunteer Rifles of the Canadian Militia; its regimental status was unique within the Canadian Militia, highlighted by the Regimental motto Nulli Secundus and its designation as the First Regiment. The Prince of Wales became the Honorary Colonel, an appointment he continued to hold after his coronation as King Edward VII in 1902.

In addition to those directly antecedent to the First Regiment, the 6th Battalion, Volunteer Militia, was raised in 1862, which later became the 6th Battalion Hochelaga Light Infantry and subsequently the 6th Battalion Fusiliers. In 1898, this Battalion disbanded and absorbed into the First Regiment to become the 1st Battalion Prince of Wales Regiment Fusiliers, which then became the 1st Regiment, Prince of Wales' Fusiliers in 1900. Lieutenant-Colonel J.H. Burland, last Commanding Officer of the Sixth Fusiliers, became the first Honorary Lieutenant-Colonel in 1904.

During the period from 1859 to 1900, both the regiment and the Sixth Fusiliers were on active service during the Fenian Raids of 1866 and 1870, and the First Regiment was next for duty in Montreal at the time of the North-West Rebellion in 1885, being encamped under arms for a month ready to go to the front. When the first South African contingent was formed as the 2nd (Special Service) Battalion, The Royal Canadian Regiment, the First Regiment contributed its quota of officers and men to "E" Company. This contribution earned the battle honour "South Africa 1899–1900".

=== Early 20th century and First World War ===
In 1911, Lieutenant-Colonel J.W. Carson (later Major-General Sir William Carson) was asked to reorganise the regiment, he agreed on the conditions that he be given a free hand in the selection of his officers; that the regiment should be renamed and become a Regiment of Foot Guards while still preserving its identity as the First Regiment of the Active Militia of Canada; and that it should be provided with an armoury of its own. The reorganisation was promulgated in January 1912, when the First Regiment became 1st Regiment, The Grenadier Guards of Canada, and in April 1914 took possession of the new armoury and changed its name again to 1st Regiment Canadian Grenadier Guards. It remained the First Regiment (although junior as a regiment of Foot Guards to the Governor General's Foot Guards, raised in 1872 as Household Troops for the Governor-General), and was seen to be the Canadian unit of Household Troops for the Sovereign.

Within a week of the declaration of the Great War, the regiment contributed the first Commanding Officer, 11 officers and 357 Non-commissioned Officers and men to the newly formed "The Royal Montreal Regiment" (14th Battalion, Canadian Expeditionary Force). Further contingents were provided to Princess Patricia's Canadian Light Infantry, the 13th Battalion (Royal Highlanders of Canada), the 23rd Battalion (Royal Montreal Regiment), 24th Battalion (Victoria Rifles of Canada), 60th Battalion (VRC), and the 73rd Battalion (RHC) all of the CEF.

Lieutenant-Colonel Frank Stephen Meighen returned from overseas command of the 14th Battalion in June 1915 and announced in September that permission finally had been given to raise an overseas battalion of the regiment, the 87th Battalion CEF. Active recruiting began on 23 October, and in seven weeks the battalion was raised and ready for its winter training in barracks at Saint-Jean-sur-Richelieu, Quebec. The battalion was unique in that recruiting had occurred not only in Montreal but in every province of Canada (rather than the restricted area allocated to other CEF Battalions) – it was a thoroughly representative "Canadian" unit.

Use of the title Canadian Grenadier Guards was also different, as the policy had been to not send CEF battalions overseas with their Militia titles; for the Canadian Grenadiers, especial authority was sought from The governor-general, the Duke of Connaught who as a British Grenadier authorised additionally the wearing of Grenadier Guards' badges.

The 87th Battalion entered France on 12 August 1916 and remained on the continent until 1919. During the war, it earned 17 honorary distinctions, and Private John Francis Young was awarded the Victoria Cross.

After the Battle of Vimy Ridge in April 1917, the increasing difficulty of finding replacements for the English-speaking battalions from Montreal became acute. Earlier, in the spring of 1916, the regiment had raised a second CEF battalion in Montreal, the 245th Battalion (Canadian Grenadier Guards), which was placed under the command of Lieut-Col. C. C. Ballantyne when it left for England. After sailing to England in May 1917, the battalion was absorbed into the 23rd Reserve Battalion, CEF upon arrival, its personnel being used to supplement the 87th Bn and the 1st (Central Ontario) Bn of the CEF. Consequently, and to retain the Canadian Grenadiers amongst the active units of the army, the decision was made to transfer the remaining personnel of the 60th Bn (VRC) to the 87th Bn. On 22 November 1918, King George V granted the title of "Guardsman" to Private soldiers of the Brigade of Guards, and this distinction extended to the Canadian Grenadiers.

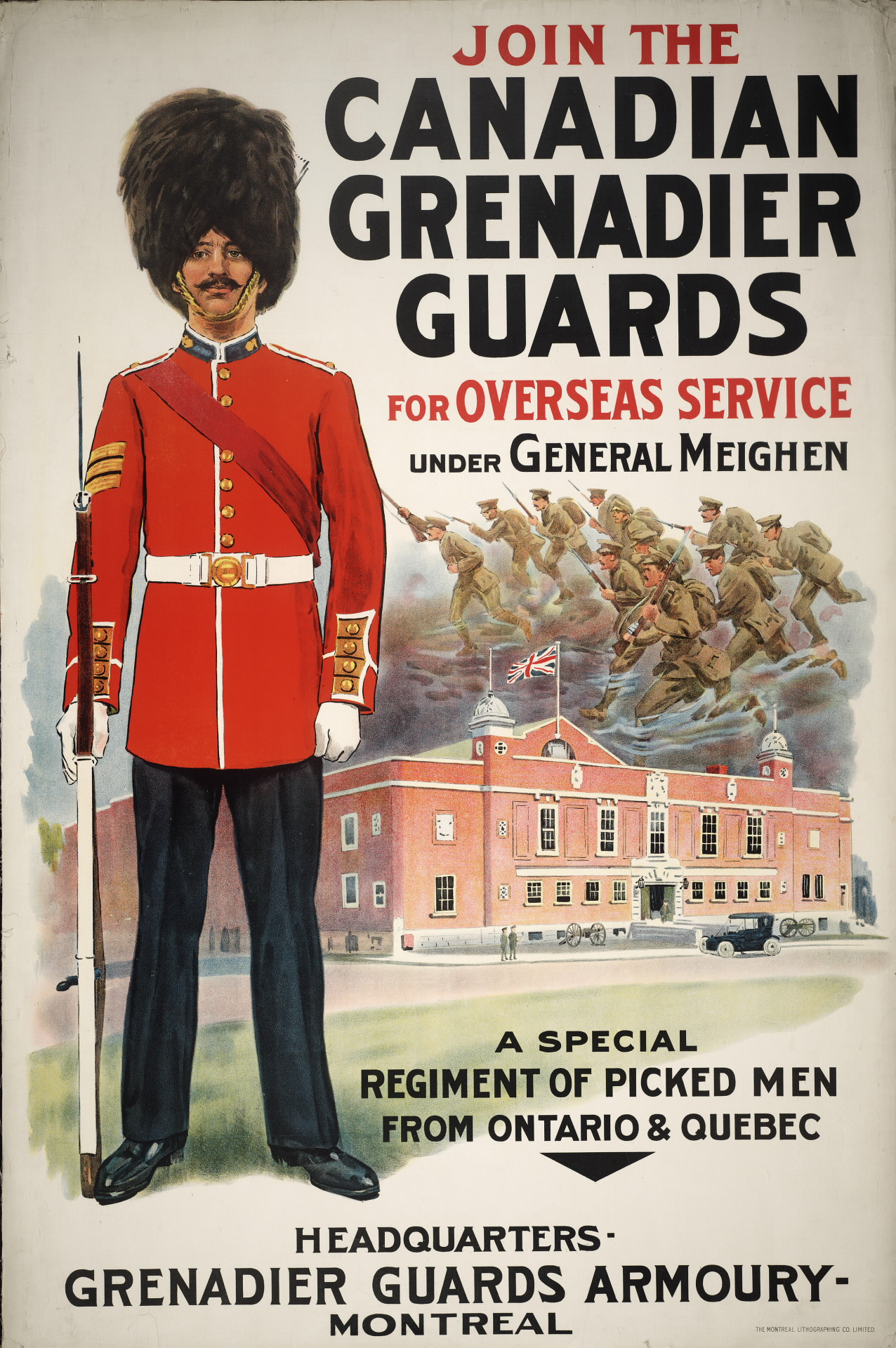
World War I recruitment poster for the Canadian Grenadier Guards.

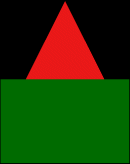
87th Battalion (Canadian Grenadier Guards) Distinguishing patches for 4th Division, 11th Brigade CEF

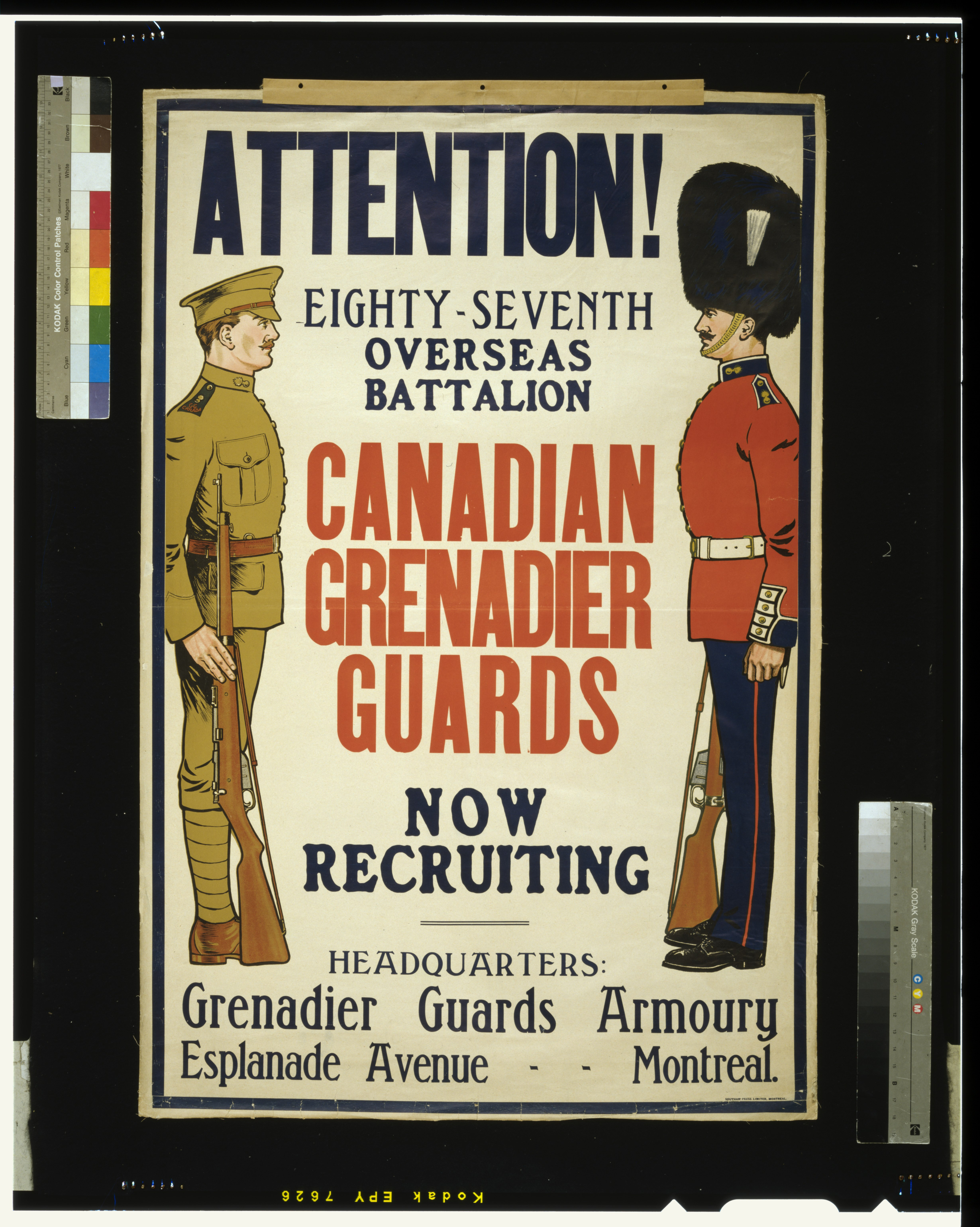
First World War recruiting poster for the Canadian Grenadier Guards and the 87th Battalion, CEF.

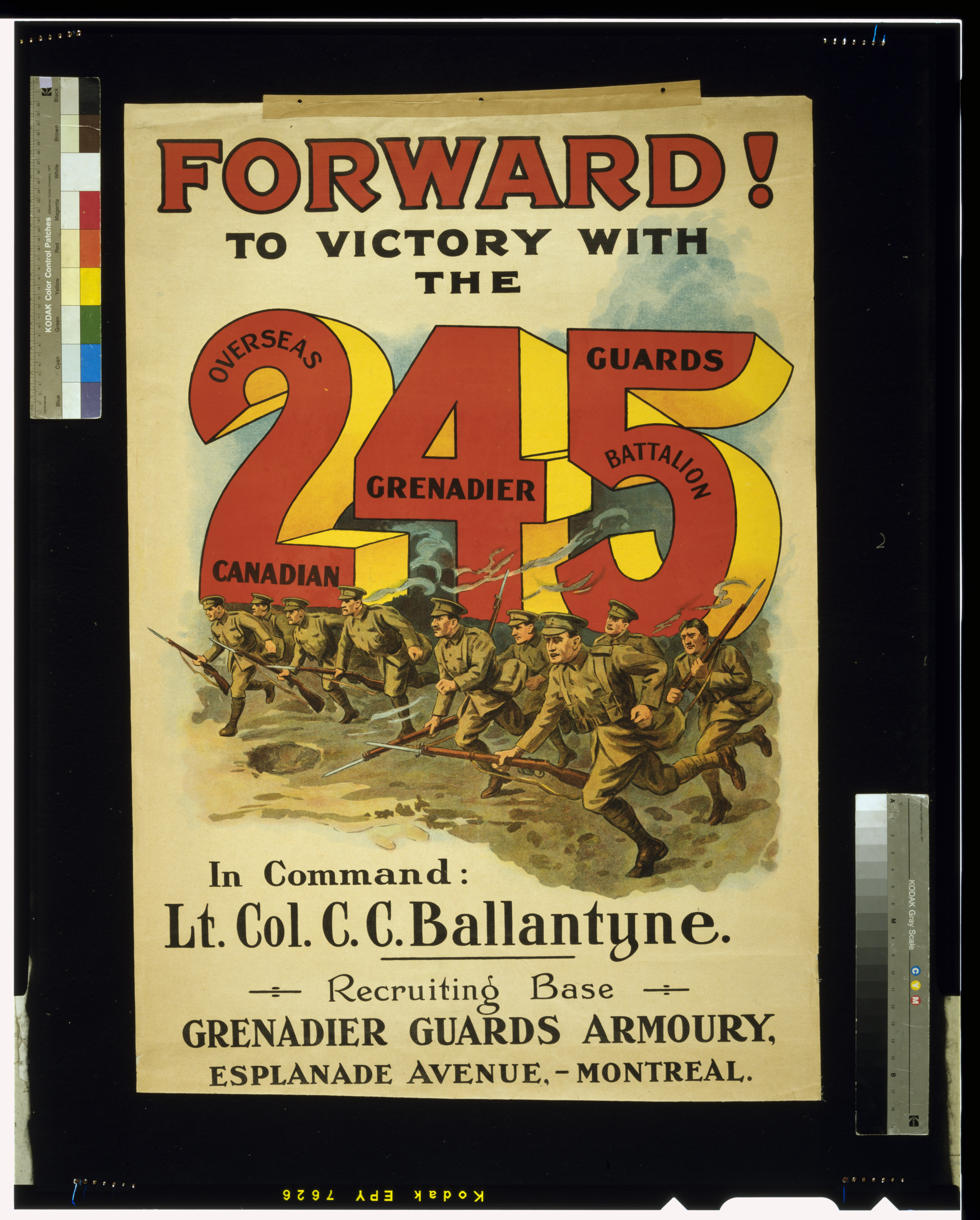
First World War recruiting poster for the Canadian Grenadier Guards and the 245th Battalion, CEF.

=== Between the wars ===
On return to Canada in 1919, the 87th Bn was demobilised; its name was perpetuated by the 1st Battalion, The Canadian Grenadier Guards (87th Bn CEF) in 1920. At the same time the 2nd Battalion, Canadian Grenadier Guards (245th Bn CEF) perpetuated the other Great War Battalion of the CEF. With this reorganisation, the regiment lost the ordinal title of "First Regiment", as numerals for all regiments were discarded.

The return to peace permitted steps to be taken to enhance the status of the regiment as a regiment of Foot Guards. In 1924, The Prince of Wales (later King Edward VIII) became the colonel-in-chief, and was able to inspect the regiment during a visit to Canada in 1927. In 1930, King George V approved the alliance with the Grenadier Guards, which linkage continues today. In 1932, he approved the use of a Stand of Foot Guard Colours (presented in 1935), and of Company Colours within the regiment. In 1937, the Brigade of Canadian Guards was authorised (comprising the GGFG and the CGG), which brigade trooped in Ottawa on a number of occasions, not least for King George VI during the Royal Visit in 1939; the brigade was inspected in England in November 1942 by Major-General Phelan (late of the CGG) who had commanded it in Ottawa in 1935.

In addition to the continuing linkage with McGill University, a strong linkage grew with the St. George's Society of Montreal. One of the benevolent societies, St. George's supported the regiment in a number of ways; in return, the regiment paraded to the regimental church (Christ Church Cathedral) on the Sunday closest to St. George's Day, at the end of which service the regiment paraded past the president of the society (often at the gates of McGill University) and then received the society "At Home". This linkage continued well into the 1960s, and members of the society are still welcome in the armoury.

=== Second World War ===
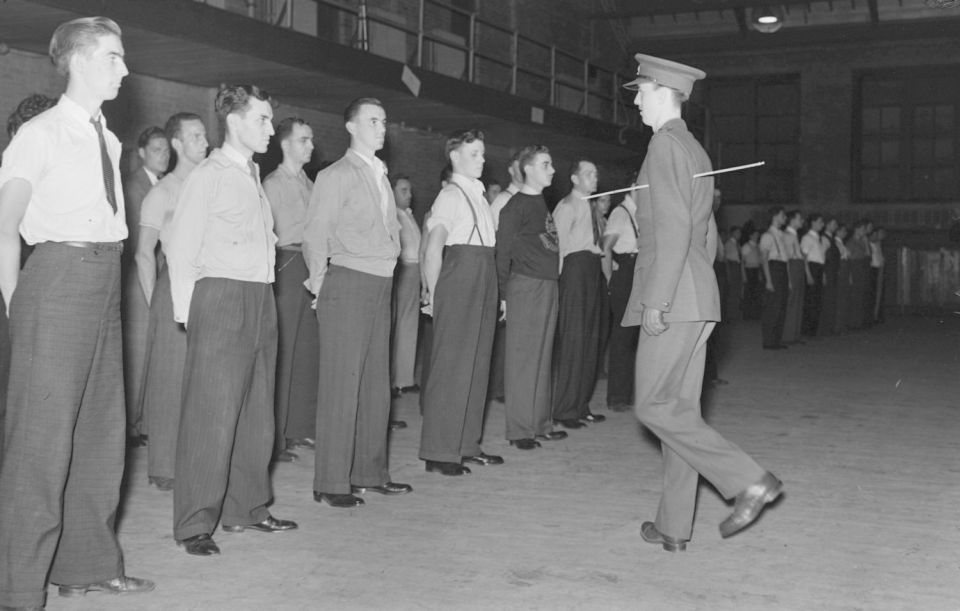
An officer of the Canadian Grenadier Guards demonstrates how to turn about to a group of recruits in civilian clothes, 1940.

At the outbreak of the Second World War, the regiment furnished 20 officers and 125 other ranks to other units before its own mobilisation in 1940 when, as 1st Battalion, the Canadian Grenadier Guards, it reached full strength in three weeks. It trained first on St. Helen's Island in Montreal, moved subsequently to Camps Borden and Valcartier, garrisoned the Halifax citadel, was stationed in Saint John, New Brunswick, and trained in Sussex, New Brunswick, and Debert, Nova Scotia.

On 5 February 1942, the First Battalion became 22nd Canadian Armoured Regiment (CGG), a unit of 4th Canadian (Armoured) Division (which included 21st Canadian Armoured Regiment (GGFG)). In September, proudly wearing the black beret of the Armoured Corps, 22 CAR moved to England where it would continue to train in a number of areas until deployed to Normandy on 21 July 1944. From that time until VE Day on 8 May 1945, 22 CAR fought throughout the battles around Falaise, the move into Belgium and the Netherlands and finally across the Rhine, earning 12 Honorary Distinctions. By this time, 22nd Canadian Tank Battalion (CGG) had been raised for the Pacific Force, but the war in the Pacific ended before it could be deployed overseas. 22nd Canadian Armoured Regiment returned to Montreal in February 1946 for demobilization and gave up its tanks.

The regiment's participation in the Second World War also saw numerous heroic actions by Sergeant Moe Hurwitz, who did not survive the war.

=== Post-Second World War ===
On formation of the 1st Battalion, the home station battalion became 2nd Battalion, the Canadian Grenadier Guards, which continued through the war the traditional role of the Militia to provide reinforcements to units overseas. Reinforcements were drawn from other units, particularly the Halifax Rifles and Princess Louise Fusiliers.

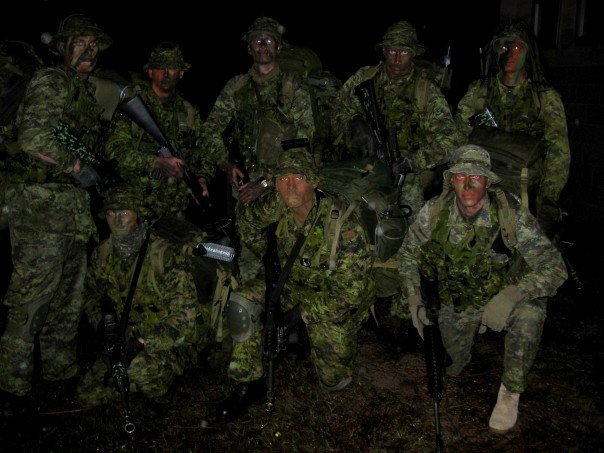
Members of the Canadian Grenadier Guard in Florida.

On reorganization, the CGG resumed its traditional Militia role as a regiment of foot guards – many of those who had served overseas continued to serve the regiment in Montreal. The peacetime routine of training, garrison duties and parades was highlighted by the appointment of King George VI as Colonel-in-Chief, the acceptance of the honorary colonelcy by Field Marshal The Viscount Alexander of Tunis (himself a guardsman), the opening by him of the Regimental Museum as a memorial to the dead in 1950 and the participation by members of the regiment in Korea. With the formation of the Canadian Guards (a regular unit of four battalions) in 1953, the regiment became the 6th Battalion, under which title it received a new stand of colours from Queen Elizabeth II, the Colonel-in-Chief, in 1959 (the first occasion where a Militia unit received a stand of colours in Canada from the hand of a reigning sovereign). Five years earlier the Queen had granted permission for four battalions to be raised.

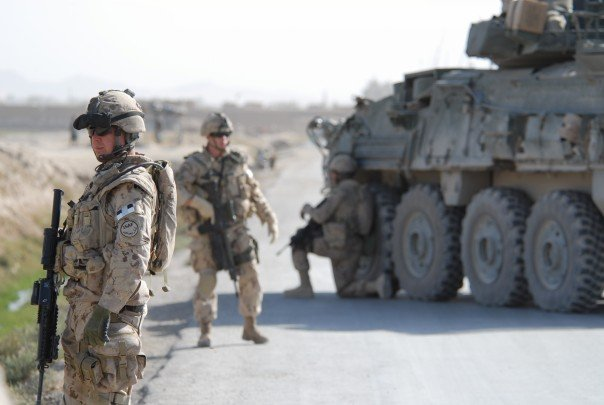

Although the responsibility for public duties in Ottawa was assumed by the Canadian Guards, the regiment provided individuals for this purpose until the formation of the Ceremonial Guard in 1969. Since that date, No. 2 (CGG) Company has participated in the Changing of the Guard on Parliament Hill and Rideau Hall during the summer months. As a result, the City of Ottawa granted its Freedom to the regiment in 1979; a similar grant was made by Montreal in 1990 in commemoration of 225 years of service to the city since the formation of 1st Company, District of Montreal Militia, in 1764.

Service to Canada and Montreal continues. Members of the regiment participated in aid to civil power at Oka and Kahnawake in the summer of 1990, and members served with the United Nations Protection Force in the former Yugoslavia, as well as with the United Nations Disengagement Observer Force in the Middle East. Members served with and in support of the International Security Assistance Force (ISAF) in Afghanistan; the Canadian name for that mission was Operation Athena. Most recently, members deployed in various capacities and roles on Operation Reassurance, Operation Unifier, Operation Impact. As well as supporting domestic operations on Operation Lentus and Operation Laser.

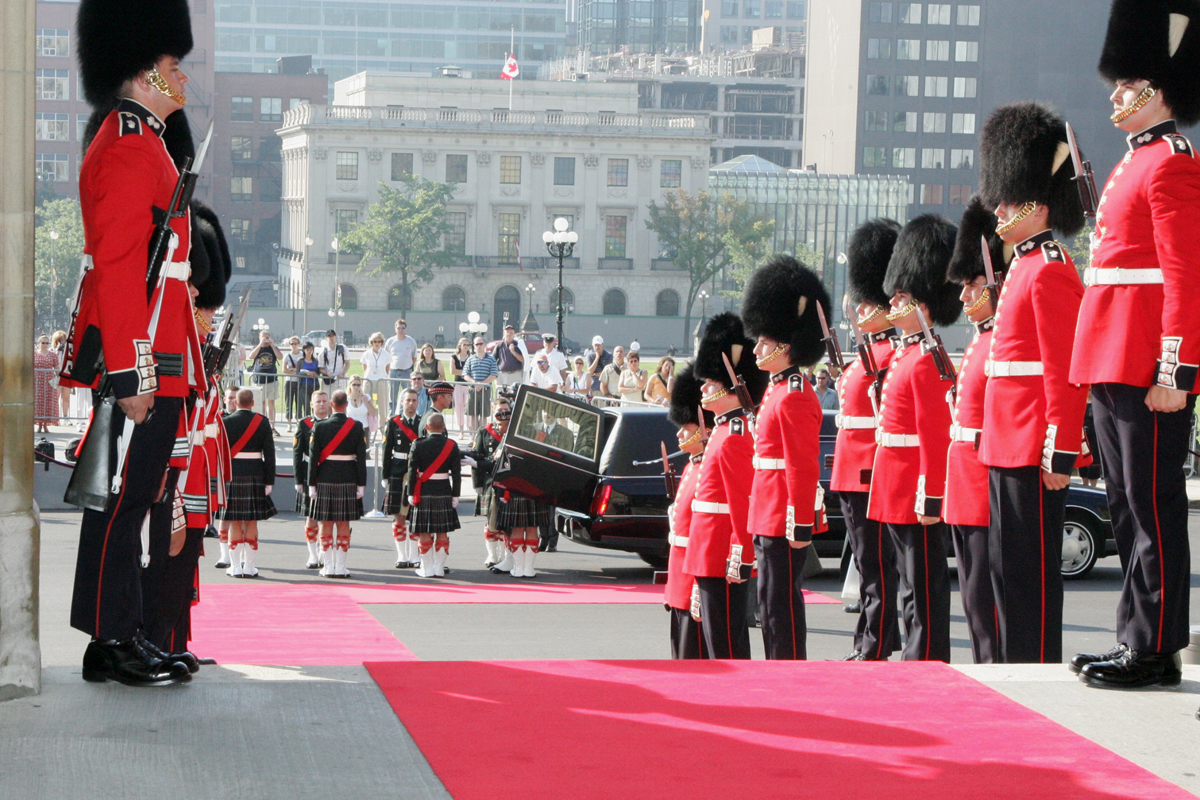
Members of the Prince of Wales Company, CGG during the funeral of Smokey Smith in Ottawa in 2005.

== Regimental structure ==
- Headquarters
- Active Battalion
  - No. 1 Canada Company - Contains actively trained personnel.
  - No. 2 Prince of Wales Company - Charged with providing a Public Duties Company for the Ceremonial Guard in Ottawa.
  - No. 3 Hochelaga Company - Charged with providing administrative, financial and logistic support
  - No. 4 Quebec Company - Charged with training untrained personnel and recruitment activities.

== Freedoms ==
The regiment has received the Freedom throughout its history at the following occasions:

- (Ontario) 1979: Ottawa
- (Quebec) 1989: Montreal
- (Quebec) 2003: Montreal
- (Quebec) 2006: Sainte-Anne-de-Bellevue
- 2023: Hampstead, Quebec

== Alliances ==
- United Kingdom – Grenadier Guards

== Battle honours ==
The regiment has been awarded 35 battle honours, of which 23 are emblazoned upon the colours (those in bold type below), and one honorary distinction. Battle honours in small capital letters are for large operations and campaigns, and those in title case are for more specific battles.

=== War of 1812 ===
- Defence of Canada – 1812–1815 – Défense du Canada
- Châteauguay
- The non-emblazonable honorary distinction Defence of Canada – 1812–1815 – Défense du Canada

=== Second Boer War (South Africa) ===
- **South Africa, 1899–1900**

=== Great War ===
- **Ypres, 1915, '17**
- **Festubert, 1915**
- Mount Sorrel
- **Somme, 1916**
- Ancre Heights
- Ancre, 1916
- **Arras, 1917, '18**
- **Vimy, 1917**
- Hill 70
- **Passchendaele**
- **Amiens**
- Scarpe, 1918
- **Drocourt–Quéant**
- Hindenburg Line
- **Canal du Nord**
- Valenciennes
- Sambre
- **France and Flanders, 1915–18**

=== Second World War ===
- **Falaise**
- **Falaise Road**
- **The Laison**
- **Chambois**
- The Scheldt
- **The Lower Maas**
- **The Rhineland**
- **The Hochwald**
- **Veen**
- **Twente Canal**
- Bad Zwischenahn
- **North-West Europe, 1944–1945**

=== War in Afghanistan ===
- Afghanistan

== Victoria Cross recipients ==
- Private John Francis Young

87th Battalion, Canadian Expeditionary Force
Dury-Arras Sector
2 September 1918

== Memorials ==
- An M4 tank at Connaught Ranges and Primary Training Centre in Ottawa was dedicated by the 22nd Armoured Regiment (The Canadian Grenadier Guards) to the memory of its soldiers who fought in Northwest Europe from 1944 to 1945.
- Coudehard-Montormel Memorial – In 1965 on the battle's 20th anniversary, a monument to the Polish, Canadian (22nd Armoured Regiment (The Canadian Grenadier Guards)), American and French units that took part in the battle was erected on Hill 262. Marking the occasion, former president of the United States Dwight D. Eisenhower commented that "no other battlefield presented such a horrible sight of death, hell, and total destruction." The Mémorial de Coudehard–Montormel museum was constructed on the same site on the battle's 50th anniversary in 1994.
- Place Léo Gariépy, Courseulles-sur-Mer – Sergeant Gariépy, a former Canadian Grenadier Guard, (1936–1940), was one of the Canadians who landed on Juno Beach on D-Day. At the end of the 1960s, Gariépy led the initiative to fish out of the water a DD tank named Bold, which had sunk off Courseulles on D-Day. The tank was raised, restored, and offered to the town. It is displayed in Place Léo Gariépy, visible from the Juno Beach Centre. Gariépy died on 8 May 1972. He was an "honorary citizen" of Courseulles-sur-Mer and is buried in the military section of Courseulles' municipal cemetery.

== Armoury ==
Site	Date(s)	Designated	Location	Description	Image
Canadian Grenadier Guards' Armoury 4171 Esplanade Avenue	1913-14	Canada's Register of Historic Places; Recognized – 1994 Register of the Government of Canada Heritage Buildings	Montreal, Quebec	Large, two-storey, brick drill hall with a low-pitched gable roof on a residential streetscape in Montreal.	Canadian Grenadier Guards Armoury

== Order of precedence ==
Preceded by The Governor General's Foot Guards	The Canadian Grenadier Guards	Succeeded by The Queen's Own Rifles of Canada

== See also ==
- Household Division
- Governor General's Horse Guards
- Governor General's Foot Guards
- Military history of Canada
- History of the Canadian Army
- Canadian Forces
- List of armouries in Canada
- Canadian Grenadier Guards Band

== Notes and references ==
=== Secondary sources ===
- Regimental Standing Orders of the Canadian Grenadier Guards. Annex A.
- Duguid, A. Fortescue (Colonel) (1965). History of the Canadian Grenadier Guards, 1760 – 1964. Montreal, Quebec, Canada: Gazette Printing Company Limited.
- Ducimus, The Regiments of the Canadian Infantry. St. Hubert, Quebec, Canada: Mobile Command Headquarters, Canadian Armed Forces. 1992. p. 248p. ISBN 0-9696421-0-5.
- "A brief outline of the story of the Canadian Grenadier Guards and the first months of the Royal Montreal Regiment in the Great War; told in an anthology of verse and prose." (Montreal, Gazette Print. Co., 1926)
- Meek, John F. (1971). Over the Top!: The Canadian Infantry in the First World War. Orangeville, Ontario: John F. Meek. OCLC 301232911.
- Canada in Khaki South Africa 1899–1900: Nominal Roll Casualties etc. – Eugene Ursual 1994
