= Household Division =

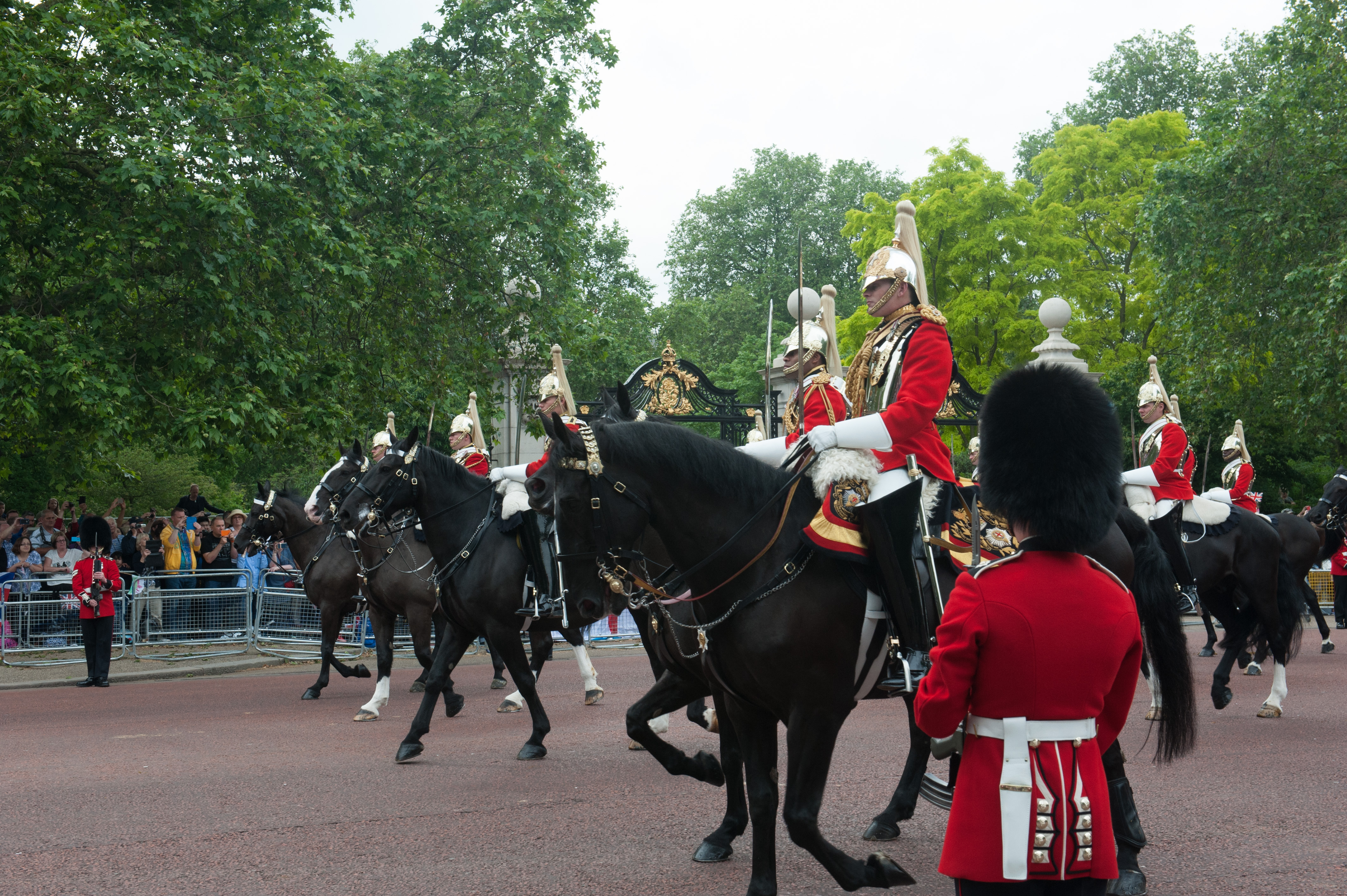
- Troopers of the Life Guards ride past a Foot Guard presenting arms
- Country: United Kingdom
- Branch: British Army
- Type: Regular
- Role: Major General Commanding The Household Division and General Officer Commanding London District
- Part of: London District
- Mottos: Latin: Septem juncta in uno, lit. 'Seven joined in one'
- Website: householddivision.org.uk

Commanders
- Colonel-in-Chief of the Regiments of the Household Division: King Charles III
- Major-General Commanding the Household Division: Major General Mark Berry
- Deputy Commander, Household Division: Colonel Guy Stone LVO
- Brigade Major, Household Division: Lieutenant Colonel Charles Foinette, Coldstream Guards
- Garrison Sergeant Major: Warrant Officer Class 1 Andrew 'Vern' Stokes

The Household Division forms a part of the British Army's London District and is made up of five regiments of foot guards and two Household Cavalry regiments. The division is responsible for performing public duties and state ceremonies in London and Windsor. Such functions include the State Opening of Parliament, Trooping the Colour, and mounting the King's Guard.

== Composition ==
In the United Kingdom, the Household Division consists of seven regiments, giving rise to the division's motto of Septem juncta in uno (Latin for 'seven joined in one'). The Household Division is made up of the Household Cavalry, which includes the Life Guards and the Blues and Royals, as well as five regiments of foot guards – the Grenadier Guards, Coldstream Guards, Scots Guards, Irish Guards and Welsh Guards.

The Household Division also includes the following incremental companies: Nijmegen Company – Grenadier Guards, No 7 Company – Coldstream Guards, F Company – Scots Guards, Numbers 9 and 12 Company – Irish Guards. The Household Division is commanded by the Major-General commanding the Household Division who is also General Officer Commanding London District.

== History ==
The Household Division was once responsible for mounting the guard to several institutions in London. In 1819, the Household Division maintained ten separate guard mountings for 89 sentry posts. These include the Armoury Guard, the British Museum Guard, the Kensington Palace Guard, the King's Guard, the Magazine Guard, the Military Asylum Guard, the Savoy Prison Guard, the Tylt Guards, and the York Hospital Guard. In addition, the Household Division also provided night guards for the Bank of England, Covent Garden Opera House, and Drury Lane. However, the Household Division's commitment to most of these postings, besides the King's Guard, ceased at the end of the 19th century.

Some historical accounts have documented instances of members of the Household Division engaging in same-sex relationships and prostitution, with reports of such activities dating back to the 19th and 20th centuries.

From 1950 to 1968, the Household Division was known as the Household Brigade.

== Similar units in other countries ==
Several Canadian units are known as "household regiments" or "household troops", given their relationship with the Canadian monarchy. This includes the Governor General's Horse Guards, Governor General's Foot Guards, and the Canadian Grenadier Guards. The term household guard is used by the Canadian Armed Forces to describe a type of quarter guard that is mounted for dignitaries including the Canadian royal family, the governor general of Canada and other heads of state.

The phrase household division or household regiment is not used in other Commonwealth countries, although some maintain units that perform similar ceremonial functions, like Australia's Federation Guard and Malaysia's Royal Malay Regiment.
