= Vern Stokes =

Soldier in the British Army (born 1972)

Warrant Officer Class 1 Vern Stokes OBE MVO DL
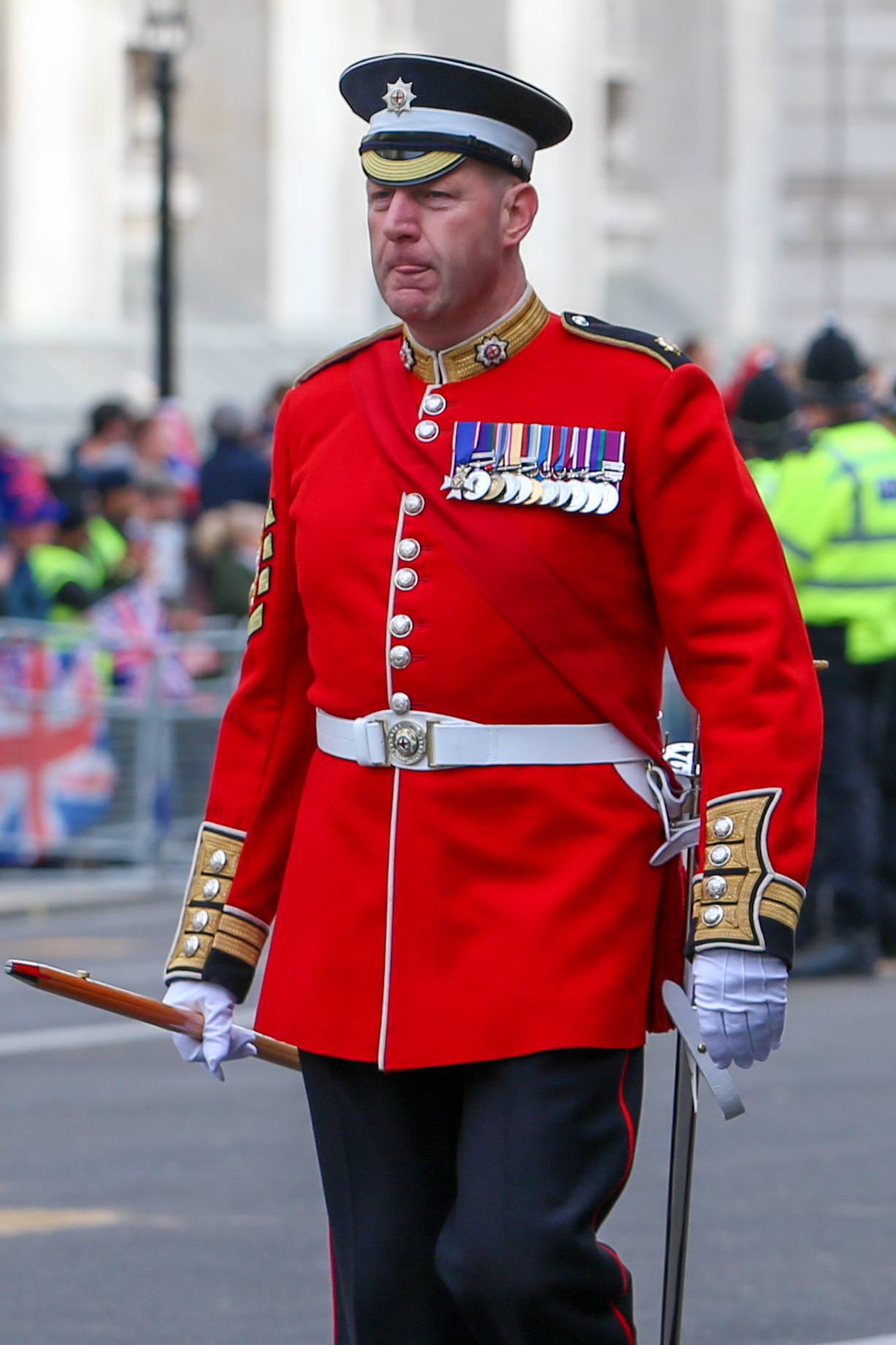
- Stokes at the Coronation of Charles III in 2023
- Born: 1972 (age 53–54); Madeley, Shropshire, England
- Military career
- Allegiance: United Kingdom
- Branch: British Army
- Service years: 1988–present
- Rank: Warrant Officer Class 1 Major (Deferred)
- Nickname: Vern
- Unit: Coldstream Guards
- Conflicts: The Troubles; Operation Grapple (Yugoslavia); Operation Telic; Operation Herrick
- Awards: Officer of the Most Excellent Order of the British Empire; Member of the Royal Victorian Order; Deputy Lieutenant of Shropshire

Warrant Officer Class 1 Andrew "Vern" Stokes, OBE, MVO, DL (born 1972) is a British Army soldier who has served as one of the army's most senior warrant officers since 2015.

== Military service ==
Born in Shropshire, England, in 1972, Stokes enlisted in the British Army in June 1988. After passing out from the Guards Depot, he was posted to 2nd Battalion, Coldstream Guards. He saw operational tours in Northern Ireland, Belize, Kenya and Bosnia. After spending time as a section commander instructor at the Infantry Battle School, he saw further operations in Northern Ireland, Iraq and Afghanistan as well as exercises in Canada. He was later posted to the Royal Military Academy Sandhurst as both a colour sergeant instructor and later as the company sergeant major. He was promoted to the highest other rank within the Coldstream Guards, Regimental Sergeant Major of the 1st Battalion, Coldstream Guards, in 2010. He was appointed the Academy Sergeant Major of Sandhurst in 2011. In 2014 he began shadowing then GSM Bill Mott, in preparation for his appointment as the GSM of the London District.

In his role as the GSM, Stokes has been involved with the planning and execution of the annual Trooping the Colour, the funeral of The Duke of Edinburgh, the state funeral of Queen Elizabeth II, and the coronation of King Charles III and Queen Camilla.
