= Moe Hurwitz =

Canadian soldier (1919–1944)

Samuel Moses "Moe" Hurwitz (January 28, 1919 – October 28, 1944) DCM, MM, was a Canadian soldier. He was the most highly decorated non-commissioned member of the Canadian Grenadier Guards during the Second World War and may have been the most decorated Jewish Canadian soldier of the war. Hurwitz was born and raised in Montreal, Quebec, Canada, as one of thirteen children, most of whom served in the war. He was, prior to enlisting, a Golden Gloves boxer and a very talented hockey player. In fact, the Boston Bruins invited him to try out for them, but he chose, instead, to enlist in the Canadian Army when war broke out.

== Earning the Military Medal ==
Hurwitz was awarded the Military Medal for extraordinary heroism and leadership in his first major action in France, on the afternoon of August 4, 1944, during the epic Battle for the Falaise Road. Reginald Roy of the Canadian War Museum described it as "one of the most swiftly successful troop actions by Canadian tanks in the entire Normandy Campaign". Moe was then second-in-command of #4 Troop, #3 Squadron of the 22nd Canadian Armoured Regiment (Canadian Grenadier Guards). Although missing one of its usual four Sherman tanks, and without infantry support, the group of 15 Grenadiers assaulted the flank of the main enemy defensive position in front of the village of Cintheaux. In little over ten minutes, they destroyed 11 German anti-tank guns, including six 88mm guns, and forced two others to withdraw. The Grenadiers also killed at least 15 Germans, captured 31 others, and opened a kilometer-wide gap in the German front line, against a loss of only one Guardsman killed and one wounded.

The citation which accompanied the Military Medal read as follows:

On August 4, 1944, during the heavy fighting, Sgt Hurwitz, Canadian Armoured Corps, was ordered to cover by fire his troop leader's assault on an enemy position. On arriving at the position it was found necessary to dismount and attack on foot. During the fight a burning enemy self-propelled gun blew up, and killed and wounded a number of men of the troop. Sgt Hurwitz was pinned under a tree by the explosion, but managed to extricate himself, and although burned from the blast and slightly wounded, he picked up a Bren gun and with his officer led the assault on the enemy position. The position which was a strong one and had been holding up the entire squadron, was taken. Thirty-one prisoners were captured, and a number of enemy killed. Sgt Hurwitz displayed a fine degree of leadership and offensive spirit, and by this action was largely responsible for the subsequent capture of the town of Cintheaux itself.

Hurwitz was awarded the Military Medal on August 8, 1944.

== Earning the Distinguished Conduct Medal ==
Six weeks later, Hurwitz was in command of #4 Troop. On September 12, 1944, assisted by three anti-aircraft Crusader tanks and C Company of the Algonquin Regiment (Motor Infantry), the Troop seized the railway station at Philippine, the Netherlands, thus sealing off the German forces in the Breskens Pocket, during the Battle of the Scheldt. That morning, again with a lack of infantry support, Hurwitz dismounted and undertook the actions that would earn him the Distinguished Conduct Medal, the second highest award that a non-commissioned member could earn at the time. Armed only with a pistol and accompanied by two Guardsmen, Hurwitz personally attacked two German machine guns and captured 25 enemy soldiers. He later helped knock out another 88mm anti-tank gun. In all, the little force took 150 prisoners at Philippine.

The citation which accompanied the Distinguished Conduct Medal read as follows:

On September 12, 1944, No.3 Squadron, Canadian Armoured Regiment, with one rifle company and a carrier scout platoon of the Algonquin Regiment under command, was ordered to seize and hold the railroad station at Sluiskil. A force made up of one infantry platoon, one section of three carriers, and a tank troop commanded by Sgt Hurwitz, was ordered to assault an intermediate strong point which consisted of slit-trenches, ditches, and a number of houses on the road to the station. Upon reaching the objective the enemy were found to be in strength, and a fierce close quarter combat ensued in deep ditches and houses where tanks could not be used to advantage. Sgt Hurwitz quickly appreciated that more men were needed on the ground and leaped from his tank, taking with him two crew members. Under covering fire from his tank, Sgt Hurwitz and the two men with him cleared three buildings, and elaborate trench systems. Sgt Hurwitz then personally charged two machine-gun posts. His only weapon was a pistol, but his daring and determination unnerved the machine-gun crews, and the positions were silenced. A total of twenty-five prisoners were taken by him, and his crew. This determined and gallant action by Sgt Hurwitz enabled his troop to move into a dominating fire position which covered the objective of the main force, and enabled it to move forward and seize the railroad station where an additional one hundred fifty prisoners were taken, and a large amount of valuable equipment captured.

Sgt Hurwitz was awarded the Distinguished Conduct Medal on September 20, 1944.

== Capture, death, and epilogue ==
After three weeks, on October 24, 1944, the Troop was leading a frustrating night attack over difficult terrain against the enemy's elite 6th Parachute Division at Wouwsche-Plantage near Bergen-op-Zoom, the Netherlands. Hurwitz' tank was advancing to the objective when the tank to his rear was knocked out, blocking the rest of the Canadian vehicles from advancing with him. The regiment fought hard and suffered other losses in a bid to reach him, but were foiled through a combination of bad luck, impassable ground, and dogged resistance from the Germans. Hurwitz' last stand began with a radio message that he was surrounded by enemy infantry and anti-tank weapons on all sides. The Sherman returned fire until it was knocked out, at which point the five-man crew dismounted and continued to fight on the ground until all were casualties.

Hurwitz, severely wounded, was captured by the Germans, and, as an unofficial prisoner of war, died of his wounds in a German hospital near Dordrecht, the Netherlands, on October 28, 1944, aged 25. His death was not known to the regiment until months later. He was buried in a Canadian military cemetery at Bergen-op-Zoom.

In Duguid's history of the Canadian Grenadier Guards the following is written: "Lost to the Regiment was its most purposeful and persistent soldier whose deeds of gallant leadership were to be an inspiration to those who succeeded him in the battles that were to follow".

In February 1948, a memorial to Sgt Hurwitz was unveiled by his surviving comrades. Beneath his photograph were mounted the ribbons of his citations, and are to this day displayed on the east wall of the Canadian Grenadier Guards' Sergeants' Mess.

On Remembrance Sunday, November 9, 2014, younger generations were reminded of Sgt Hurwitz's heroism when a re-dedication of his medals and tribute meal were held at the Canadian Grenadier Guards armoury in Montreal. In attendance was one of Moe's two surviving brothers, Harry Hurwitz (himself a survivor of the sinking of HMCS Athabaskan and subsequently a prisoner of war), and his family.
