= Bill Mott (British Army soldier) =

Former British Army soldier

Bill Mott OBE MVO
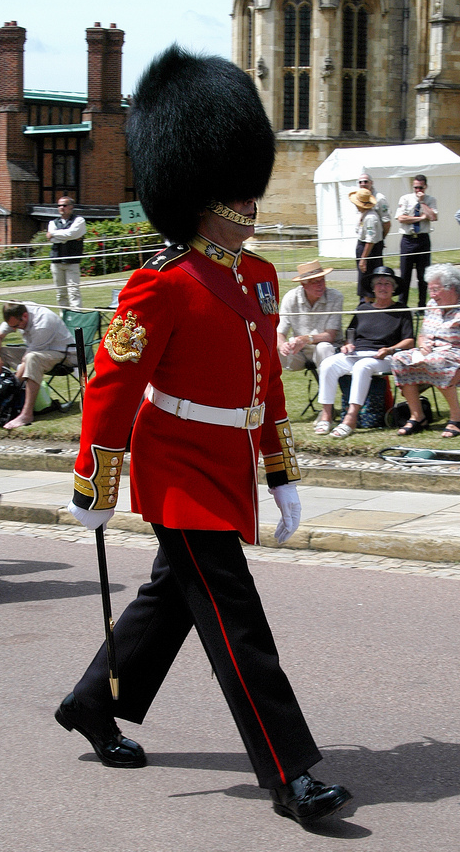
- Mott at the Garter Service at Windsor Castle.
- Born: 1961 (age 64–65); Ellesmere Port, England
- Military career
- Allegiance: United Kingdom
- Branch: British Army
- Service years: 1979–2015
- Rank: Warrant Officer Class 1
- Nickname: Bill or Billy
- Service number: 24520588
- Unit: Welsh Guards
- Conflicts: The Troubles; Falklands War
- Awards: Officer of the Most Excellent Order of the British Empire; Member of the Royal Victorian Order

William Daran Gillduff Mott (born 1961) is a retired British Army soldier who was one of the army's most senior warrant officers between 2002 and 2015.

== British service ==
Mott was brought up in Overpool, Cheshire, before enlisting into the 1st Battalion, Welsh Guards in April 1979. He saw operational tours in Northern Ireland and during the Falklands War in 1982. He served at the Royal Military Academy Sandhurst as a colour sergeant, company sergeant major, and regimental sergeant major, before becoming garrison sergeant major (GSM) at HQ Northern Ireland. He became GSM HQ London District in late 2002 and oversaw his first Trooping the Colour parade as GSM in June 2003. He was subsequently in charge of organising, choreographing and overseeing all major state ceremonial occasions. From 2003 he was also a pivotal figure in organising the repatriation ceremonies for British soldiers killed in action during operations in the Iraq War and the War in Afghanistan.

In February 2014, Mott publicly warned that cuts to the British defence budget were threatening to undermine the future spectacle of state ceremonial events in the United Kingdom.

He retired from the army in June 2015 following Trooping the Colour, during which the Welsh Guards marked the centennial year of their foundation.

== Valley Forge ==
Following retirement, Mott relocated to the United States in 2015 to join his American wife in Kentucky. He was then invited to join the Valley Forge Military Academy (VFMAC) in Wayne, Pennsylvania, where he quickly moved up in the hierarchy to be appointed as VFMAC's Garrison Sergeant Major. Until moving to Missouri Military Academy, Mott was employed by the Valley Forge Military Academy as acting Commandant of Cadets, alongside working with the department of admissions and directing ceremonial drill.

== Missouri Military Academy ==
In 2025 Mott became the Deputy Commandant of Operations at Missouri Military Academy in Mexico, Missouri.

== Awards and honours ==
Mott was awarded the Meritorious Service Medal in 2005. He was appointed Officer of the Order of the British Empire (OBE) in the 2007 Birthday Honours. In the 2012 Diamond Jubilee Honours he was appointed Member of the Royal Victorian Order (MVO) for his personal service to the monarch during the Diamond Jubilee of Elizabeth II. Mott was granted Freedom of the City of London in November 2013.
