= Royal Montreal Regiment =

The Royal Montreal Regiment
- Cap badge
- Active: 2 November 1914
- Country: Canada
- Branch: Canadian Army
- Type: Line infantry
- Role: Infantry
- Size: One battalion
- Part of: Royal Canadian Infantry Corps
- Garrison/HQ: Westmount, Quebec
- Motto: Honi soit qui mal y pense (Anglo-Norman for 'Shame on him who thinks ill of it')
- March: "Ça Ira"
- Engagements: First World War; Second World War; War in Afghanistan
- Battle honours: See #Battle honours

The Royal Montreal Regiment is a Primary Reserve infantry regiment of the Canadian Army based in Westmount, Quebec. It is part of the 2nd Canadian Division's 34 Canadian Brigade Group.

== Lineage ==
Regimental colour

Camp flag

=== The Royal Montreal Regiment ===
- Originated 2 November 1914 in Westmount, Quebec as an "8 company regiment of infantry"
- Designated 1 December 1914 as the 58th Westmount Rifles
- Redesignated 29 March 1920 as The Royal Montreal Regiment
- Redesignated 15 December 1936 as The Royal Montreal Regiment (Machine Gun)'
- Redesignated 7 November 1940 as the 2nd (Reserve) Battalion, The Royal Montreal Regiment (Machine Gun)
- Redesignated 16 October 1945 as The Royal Montreal Regiment (Machine Gun)
- Redesignated 1 September 1954 as The Royal Montreal Regiment

=== Lineage chart ===
Lineage chart

1914	14th Bn, CEF	58th Westmount Rifles	23rd Bn, CEF
1915	23rd Reserve Bn, CEF
1920	Disbanded	1st Bn (14th Bn, CEF), The Royal Montreal Regt	Disbanded	2nd Bn, (Note: Reserve) The Royal Montreal Regt
1920	1st (Westmount) Bn (14th Bn, CEF), The Royal Montreal Regt	2nd Bn (23rd Bn, CEF), The Royal Montreal Regt
1936	The Royal Montreal Regt (MG)	Disbanded
1939	The Royal Montreal Regt (MG), CASF
1940	1st Bn, The Royal Montreal Regt (MG), CASF	2nd (Reserve) Bn, The Royal Montreal Regt (MG)
1943	32nd Recce Regt (Royal Montreal Regt), CAC, CASF
1944	First Army HQ Defence Coy (Royal Montreal Regt), CASF	No. 9 Defence and Employment Pl (Royal Montreal Regt), CIC, CASF
1945	First Canadian Army HQ Defence Bn (Royal Montreal Regt), CASF	6th Canadian Infy Div. Recce Tp (The Royal Montreal Regt), CAC, CASF
1945	6th Canadian Infy Div. Recce Tp (The Royal Montreal Regt), RCAC, CASF
1945	Disbanded	Disbanded	Disbanded	The Royal Montreal Regt (MG)
1954	The Royal Montreal Regt

== Perpetuations ==
=== Great War ===
- 14th Battalion (Royal Montreal Regiment), CEF
- 23rd Reserve Battalion, CEF

== Operational history ==
=== Great War ===
The Great War distinguishing patch of the 14th Battalion (Royal Montreal Regiment), CEF

The 14th Battalion (Royal Montreal Regiment), CEF was authorized on 1 September 1914 and embarked for Great Britain on 27 and 29 September 1914. It disembarked in France on 15 February 1915, where it fought as part of the 3rd Infantry Brigade, 1st Canadian Division in France and Flanders until the end of the war. The battalion disbanded on 15 September 1920.

The 23rd Reserve Battalion, CEF was authorized on 21 October 1914 as the 23rd Battalion, CEF, and embarked for Great Britain on 23 February 1915 where it was redesignated as the 23rd Reserve Battalion, CEF on 18 April 1915 to provide reinforcements for the Canadian Corps in the field. The battalion disbanded on 15 September 1920.

=== Second World War ===
The regiment mobilized as The Royal Montreal Regiment (Machine Gun), CASF, for active service on 1 September 1939. It was redesignated 1st Battalion, The Royal Montreal Regiment (Machine Gun), CASF, on 7 November 1940. The regiment converted to armour on 25 January 1943 and was redesignated the 32nd Reconnaissance Regiment (Royal Montreal Regiment), CAC, CASF. It was reconverted back to infantry on 12 April 1944 and redesignated as the First Army Headquarters Defence Company (Royal Montreal Regiment), CASF, and on 5 April 1945 as the First Canadian Army Headquarters Defence Battalion (Royal Montreal Regiment), CASF.

The Royal Montreal Regiment (Machine Gun) embarked for Great Britain on 7 December 1939. On 28 July 1944, the First Army Headquarters Defence Company (Royal Montreal Regiment), CASF, landed in France as a unit of First Canadian Army troops, and it continued to serve in northwest Europe until the end of the war. The overseas battalion disbanded on 30 September 1945.

On 24 May 1944, a sub-unit of the regiment, designated as the No. 9 Defence and Employment Platoon (Royal Montreal Regiment), CIC, CASF, was mobilized in England. On 27 June 1944, it landed in France as a unit of First Canadian Army troops, and it continued to serve in northwest Europe until the end of the war. This overseas platoon disbanded on 16 October 1945.

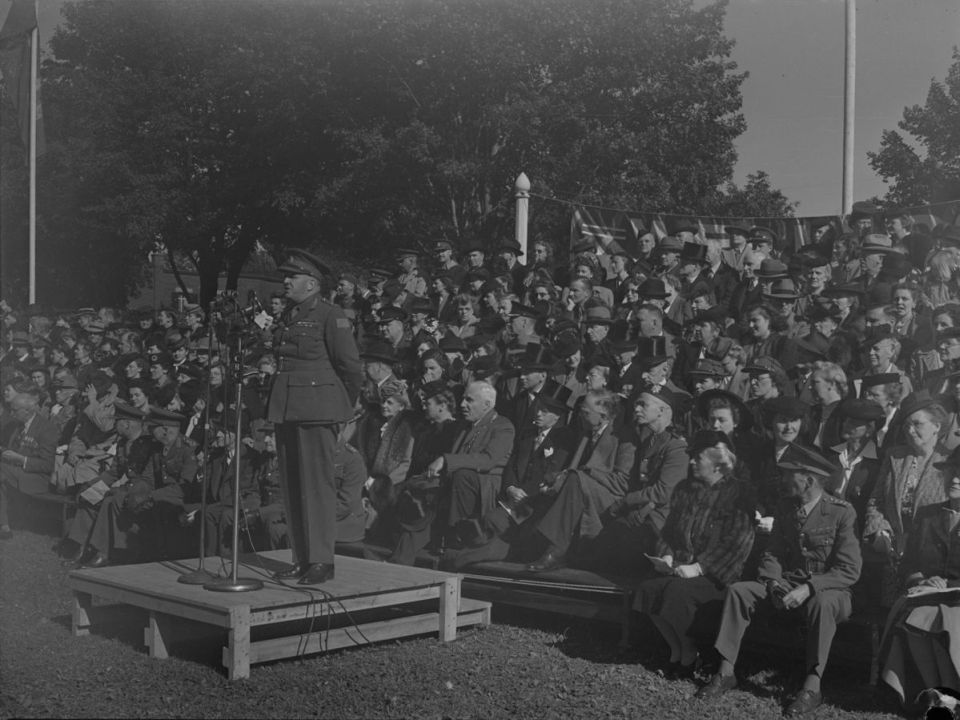
In 1945

On 1 June 1945, a second Active Force component of the regiment mobilized for service in the Pacific theatre of operations as the 6th Canadian Infantry Division Reconnaissance Troop (The Royal Montreal Regiment), CAC, CASF. It was redesignated the 6th Canadian Infantry Division Reconnaissance Troop (The Royal Montreal Regiment), RCAC, CASF, on 2 August 1945. The troop disbanded on 1 November 1945.

=== Afghanistan ===
The regiment contributed an aggregate of more than 20% of its authorized strength to the various Task Forces which served in Afghanistan between 2002 and 2014.

== Alliances ==
- United Kingdom - The Yorkshire Regiment (14th/15th, 19th and 33rd/76th Foot)

== Battle honours ==
The regimental colour of The Royal Montreal Regiment

In the list below, battle honours in small capitals were awarded for participation in large operations and campaigns, while those in lowercase were granted for more specific battles. Those battle honours in bold type are emblazoned on the regimental colour.

First World War
- **Ypres, 1915, '17**
- Gravenstafel
- **St. Julien**
- **Festubert, 1915**
- **Mount Sorrel**
- **Somme, 1916**
- Pozières
- Thiepval
- Ancre Heights
- Arras, 1917, '18
- **Vimy, 1917**
- Arleux
- Scarpe, 1917, '18
- Hill 70
- **Passchendaele**
- **Amiens**
- **Drocourt–Quéant**
- Hindenburg Line
- **Canal du Nord**
- Pursuit to Mons
- France and Flanders, 1915–18
Second World War
- **Calais, 1944**
- **The Scheldt**
- **Leopold Canal**
- **North-West Europe, 1944–1945**

Honorary distinction: Second World War badge of the Canadian Armoured Corps borne on the regimental colour and appointments, for service with that arm

South-West Asia
Afghanistan

== Victoria Crosses ==
- Francis Alexander Caron Scrimger
- George Burdon McKean

== Badge / insignia ==

Argent an autumnal maple leaf proper inscribed ROYAL MONTREAL REGT in letters Or within a belt Azure edged, buckled and inscribed HONI SOIT QUI MAL Y PENSE in letters Or ensigned by the Royal Crown proper and set above a scroll Azure edged and inscribed CANADA in letters Or

The maple leaf and scroll bearing the word “CANADA” represent service to Canada, and the Crown, service to the Sovereign. The belt, with motto, is the insignia of the Most Noble Order of the Garter. “ROYAL MONTREAL REGT” is a form of the regimental title and “HONI SOIT QUI MAL Y PENSE” is the motto of the regiment.

== Armoury ==
Site	Date(s)	Designated	Location	Description	Image
Westmount Armoury 4625 St. Catherine Street West	1925	Canada's Register of Historic Places	Westmount, Quebec	Housing The Royal Montreal Regiment, this two-storey, red brick building in a residential neighbourhood is set in landscaped grounds planted with mature trees.	

Royal Montreal Regiment Museum
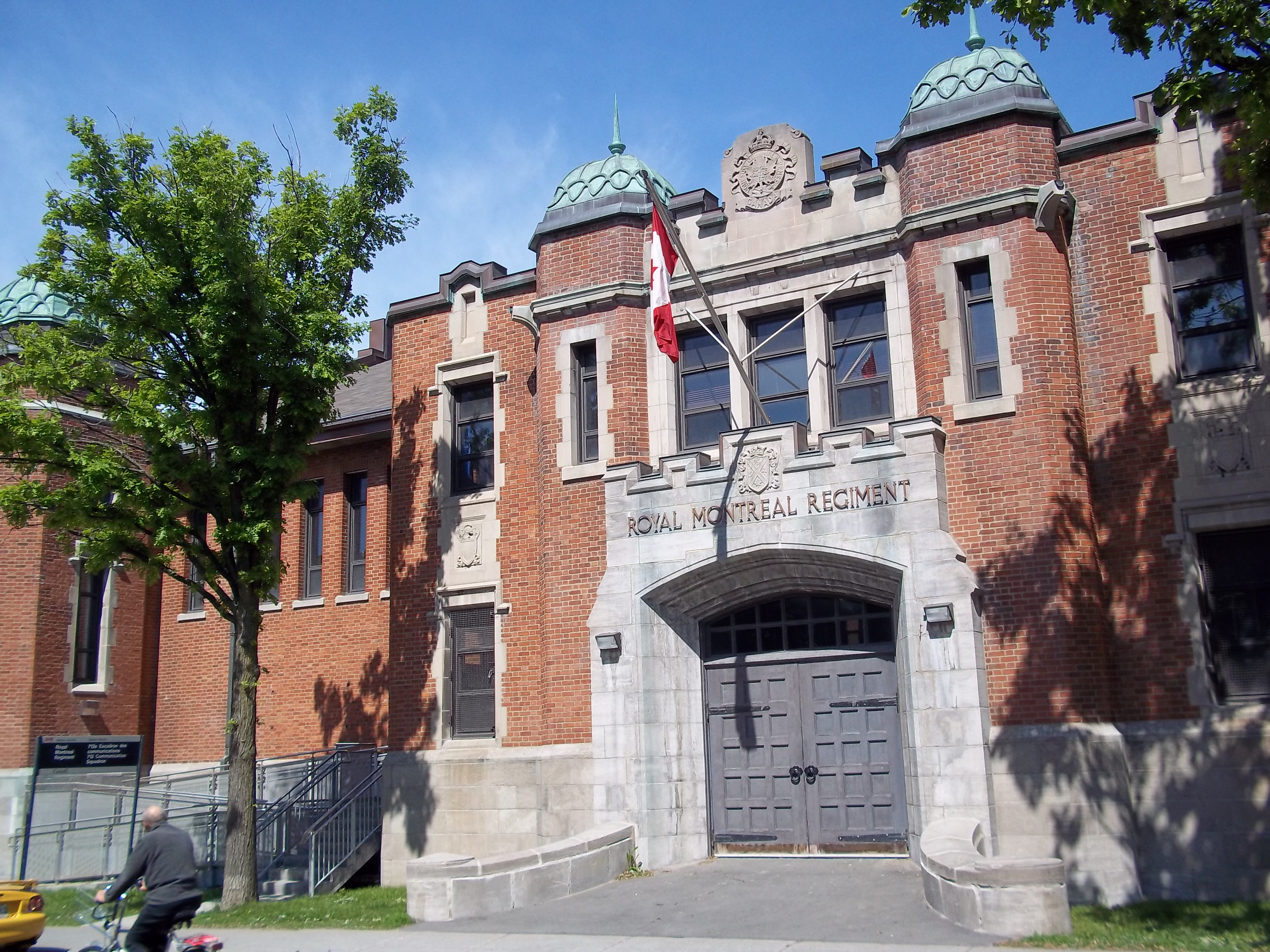
- Location: 4625, Saint Catherine Street, Westmount
- Type: Regimental Museum

The mission of the museum is to collect, preserve, research and photograph material relating to the history of the Royal Montreal Regiment, its former members and its site, and, through the appropriate display of such items, to convey this history to the currently serving members, the broader Canadian Forces community and the public. The museum is affiliated with: CMA, CHIN, OMMC and Virtual Museum of Canada.

== Media ==
- The Royal Montreal Regiment 1925-1945 by R. C. Fetherstonhaugh (1949)
- The Royal Montreal Regiment 14th Battalion C. E. F. 1914-1925 by R. C. Fetherstonhaugh (1927)

== See also ==
- List of armouries in Canada
- Military history of Canada
- History of the Canadian Army
- Canadian Forces
- The Canadian Crown and the Canadian Forces

== Order of precedence ==
Preceded by The Canadian Scottish Regiment (Princess Mary's)	The Royal Montreal Regiment	Succeeded by The Irish Regiment of Canada
