= Foot guards =

Senior infantry regiments in some militaries

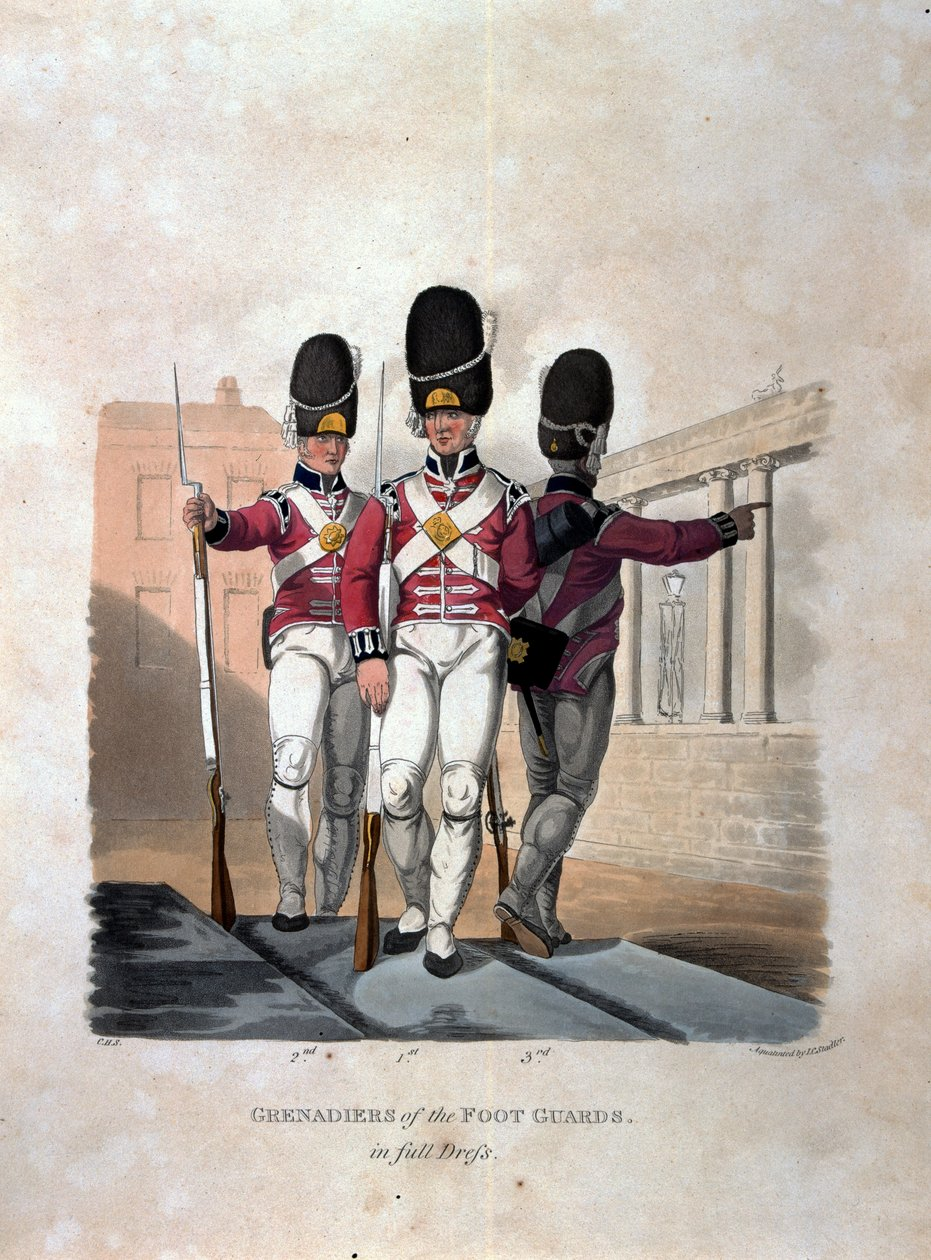
1815 engraving of grenadiers of the British Army's foot guards

Foot guards are senior infantry regiments within the British Army and the Canadian Army whose primary role includes military and combat operations, while its secondary role include public duties responsibilities which reflect their senior status. Foot guards regiments were historically infantry soldiers who fought on foot who also performed public duties like mounting a guard.

The British foot guards were established in the 17th century, and served as an infantry unit and royal guards for the monarchy. In the 19th century, the Canadian foot guard were formed, modelled after their British counterparts as a reflection of Canada’s relationship with the monarchy and to undertake ceremonial duties in Ottawa. Historically, other countries have also maintained units called "foot guards," though not all of these were the senior infantry regiments of their forces or were units that were tasked with both military combat responsibilities and ceremonial public duties.

As of 2025, the British Army maintains five regiments of foot guards, while the Canadian Army Reserve maintains two regiments of foot guards. While most foot guard units continue to serve in light infantry or infantry roles, two of the five British foot guards regiments have transitioned to mechanised infantry roles.

== United Kingdom ==
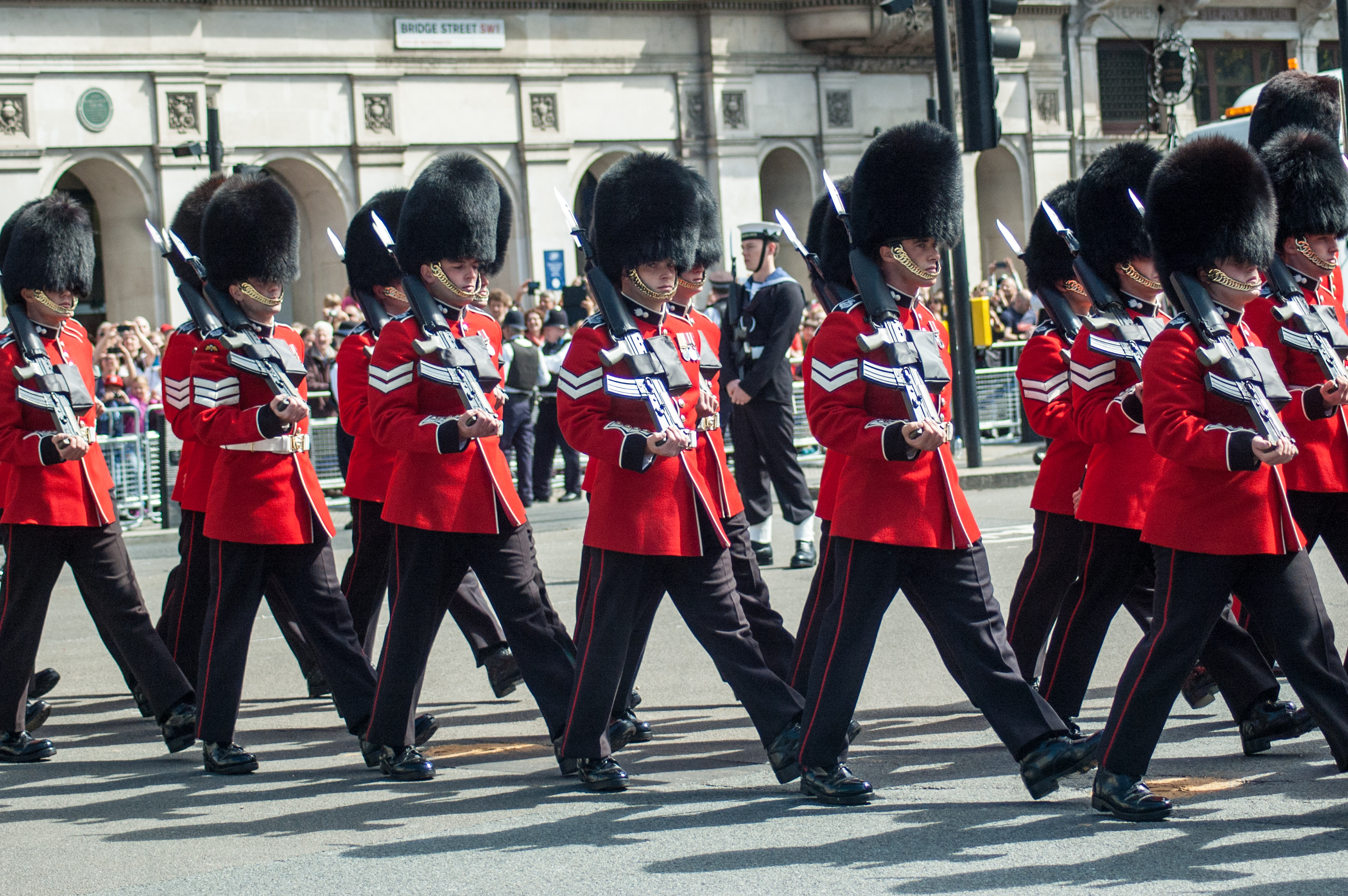
The Grenadier Guards performing public duties during the 2015 State Opening of Parliament by Queen Elizabeth II, accompanying her procession to the Palace of Westminster.

The British Army maintains five regiments of foot guards. The Grenadier Guards, Coldstream Guards, and Irish Guards specialise in infantry and light infantry roles, while the Scots Guards and Welsh Guards specialise in mechanised and light mechanised infantry roles. The five foot guard regiments form the infantry component of the Household Division.

=== History ===
The oldest foot guards regiment dates back to 1642. Foot guards units have historically been front-line troops, with their ceremonial public duties always being a secondary function. As royal guards to the British monarch, the foot guards have accumulated unique privileges and traditions over their existence. The reigning British monarch traditionally serves as the colonel-in-chief of the regiments within the Household Division.

The three oldest regiments—the Grenadier Guards, Coldstream Guards, and Scots Guards—were formed during the English Civil War, while the Irish Guards and Welsh Guards were established in the 20th century. The Irish Guards were created in 1900 after Queen Victoria was impressed by the actions of Irish units during the Second Boer War. The Welsh Guards were formed in 1915 by King George V, after it was pointed out that the Household Division lacked representation from Wales. A sixth regiment of foot guards briefly existed after the First World War, the Guards Machine Gun Regiment.

=== Public duties ===
The regiments of the foot guards are responsible for performing public duties, most notably mounting the King's Guard at St. James's Palace and Buckingham Palace, as well as mounting the Windsor Castle Guard, and the Tower of London Guard, all key locations of significance to the monarchy. Although the regiments of foot guards perform the majority of these public duties, they occasionally are supported by other units in the British Armed Forces and the Commonwealth of Nations.

Historically, the foot guards also manned ten other sentry posts around London, including Horse Guards, Savoy Prison, and Montagu House.

== Canada ==
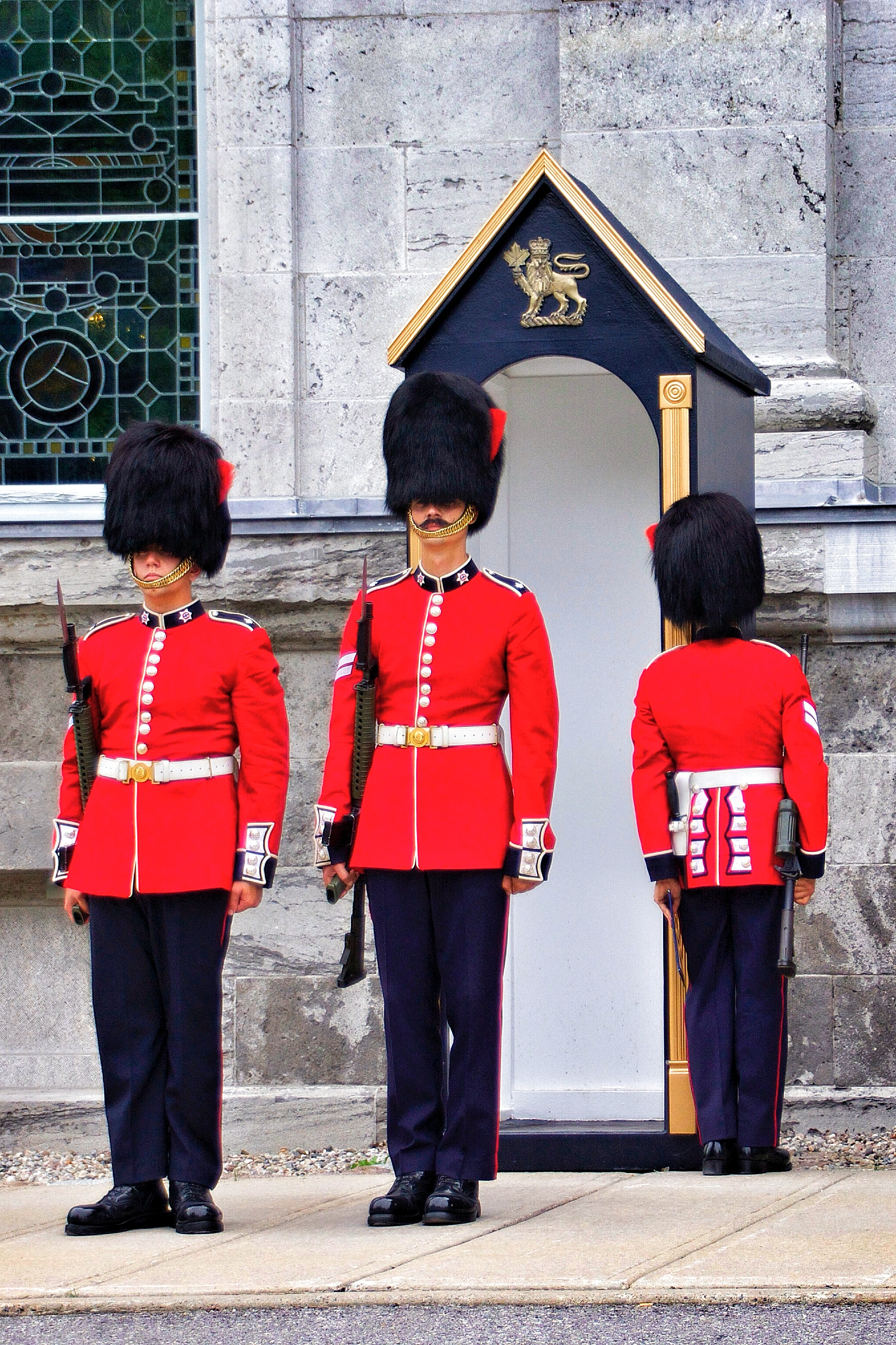
Members of the Governor General's Foot Guards mount a sentry post at Rideau Hall. The unit is one of two regiments of foot guards in Canada.

The Canadian Army Reserve includes two regiments of foot guards formed in the mid-19th century, the Ottawa-based Governor General's Foot Guards and the Montreal-based Canadian Grenadier Guards. As senior infantry regiments of the Canadian Army Reserve, regiments of foot guards take precedence over other reserve infantry regiments regardless of their date of origin. Beyond public duties, guardsmen train in an infantry role to support Canadian Armed Forces domestic operations and support the Regular Force in international operations. The two units form part of Canada's household troops and serve as a symbol of the armed forces' relationship with the Canadian monarchy, tasked with public duties in Ottawa as a result.

The Canadian Army Regular Force also established a foot guard regiment in 1953, known as the Canadian Guards. However, the unit was reduced to nil strength in 1970 and reassigned to the army's Supplementary Order of Battle.

The Royal Regiment of Canada is another Army Reserve unit that is uniformed as a regiment of foot guards, although they are formally a line infantry regiment. The regiment adopted the uniform of its predecessor, the Royal Grenadiers, which was uniformed after the British Grenadier Guards.

=== Public duties ===
Along with their infantry role, the two regiments of foot guards are also tasked with ceremonial public duties at Rideau Hall and Parliament Hill in Ottawa as the country's household troops.

In addition to supporting ceremonial duties at Rideau Hall and other events for the Governor General of Canada, the Governor General's Foot Guards' Public Duties Company also oversees the Ceremonial Guard. The Ceremonial Guard is a subunit of the Governor General's Foot Guards that operates during the summer and is open to members of the Canadian Armed Forces who want to participate in ceremonial public duties. Service members in the Ceremonial Guard wear the uniforms of the two Canadian foot guard regiments, regardless of their actual regimental or unit affiliation, as they perform public duties traditionally carried out by the foot guard regiments.

== Other historical uses ==
=== Germany ===
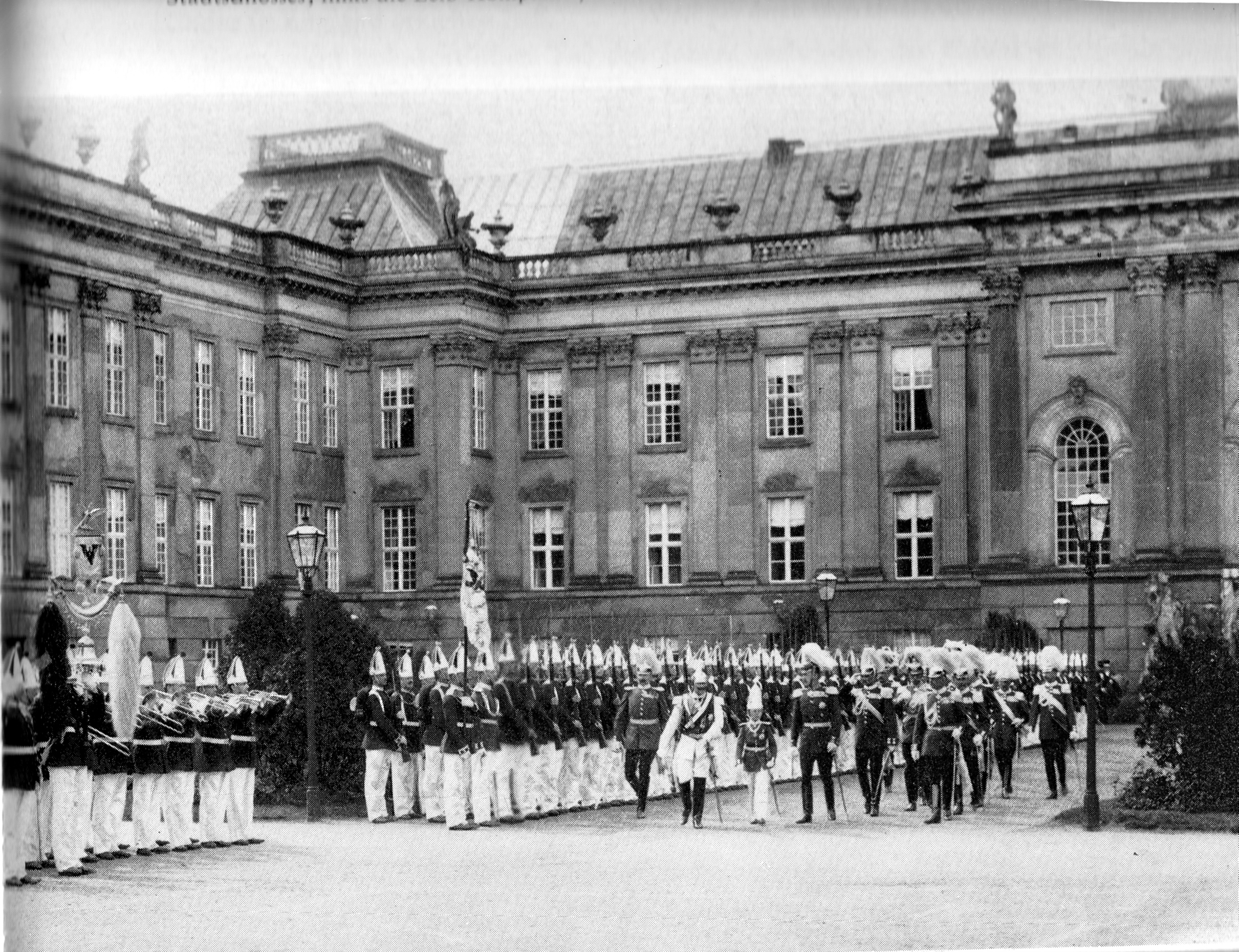
1st Foot Guards of the Imperial German Army form a guard of honour for Emperor Wilhelm II and Prince Oskar of Prussia, 1898.

The Prussian Army of the Kingdom of Prussia and the Imperial German Army of the German Empire operated several Garde-Regiment zu Fuß (lit. 'guard regiment on foot') units, including the 1st Foot Guards, 3rd Foot Guards, 4th Foot Guards, and 5th Foot Guards. All Prussian princes received their military commission through the 1st Foot Guards.

=== Japan ===
The hatamoto were high-ranking samurai who served as personally served the daimyo in feudal Japan during the Tokugawa shogunate that included a subgroup called the kachi or "Foot Guards", and the umamawari-shū or "Horse Guards". However, only the umamawari-shū were tasked as bodyguards for the daimyo, while the kachi were not assigned ceremonial duties and engaged in combat as part of their training for higher positions.

== See also ==
- Guard of honour
- Imperial guard
- Life guard (military)
- Protective security unit
