= 23rd Reserve Battalion, CEF =

Infantry unit in the Canadian Expeditionary Force

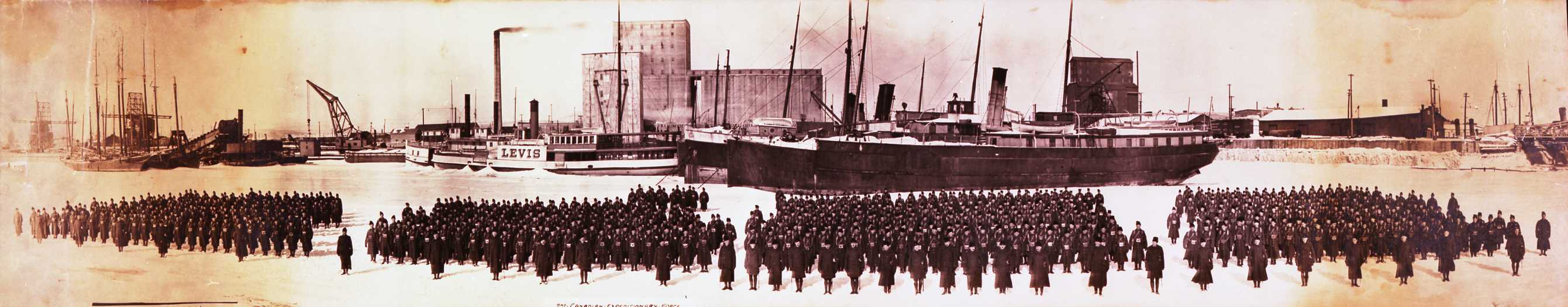
- The 23rd Infantry Battalion departing Quebec City on February 2, 1915
- Active: 1914-1920
- Country: Canada
- Branch: Canadian Expeditionary Force
- Role: Infantry
- Size: battalion
- Engagements: First World War

The 23rd Reserve Battalion, CEF was an infantry unit in the Canadian Expeditionary Force during the First World War.

== History ==
Formed as the 23rd Infantry Battalion on August 6, 1914, the battalion mobilized at Quebec City, and recruited in various cities across Canada, including Vancouver, Edmonton, Calgary, Winnipeg, Montreal and Quebec City. The initial core of the battalion comprised trained recruits from The Canadian Grenadier Guards and the 58th Regiment Westmount Rifles.

The battalion sailed for England on the S.S. Missanabie on February 2, 1915, under the command of Lieutenant-Colonel F.W. Fisher, with a complement of 35 officers and 942 other ranks. On April 29, 1915, the unit was re-organized as the 23rd Reserve Battalion.

For the duration of the war, the 23rd Reserve Battalion, based in England, trained and provided reinforcements for Canadian infantry units fighting in France. The unit routinely received reinforcements from Canada, both directly and through the absorption of other infantry battalions.

It absorbed the 117th (Eastern Townships) Battalion, CEF in August 1916.

On May 11, 1917, after absorbing the 199th Battalion Duchess of Connaught's Own Irish Rangers, CEF, the battalion was redesignated the 23rd Canadian Reserve Battalion (199th Duchess of Connaught's Own Irish Canadian Rangers).

The battalion was disbanded by general order on September 15, 1920, and is currently perpetuated by The Royal Montreal Regiment.

== See also ==
- List of infantry battalions in the Canadian Expeditionary Force
